= Clementon Township, New Jersey =

Township in New Jersey, U.S.

Coordinates: 39.8072°N 74.9973°W

Historical population
Census	Pop.	Note	%±
1910	2,794		—
1920	3,491		24.9%

Clementon Township is a now dissolved township in Camden County, New Jersey, which existed from 1903 until 1941. It was formed by an act of the New Jersey Legislature on February 24, 1903, from portions of Gloucester Township.

Laurel Springs was created from portions of the township on April 2, 1913, based on the results of a referendum on May 1, 1913. Magnolia was formed on April 14, 1915, from portions of Clementon Township and Centre Township, based on a May 12, 1915, referendum.

Two boroughs were created on February 13, 1925, Clementon Borough and Stratford Borough, both based on referendums held on March 17, 1925. Five more boroughs were created on April 23, 1929; Hi-Nella Borough, Lindenwold Borough, Pine Hill Borough, Pine Valley Borough, and Somerdale Borough.

The township survived until May 16, 1941, when the remaining rump of the township was absorbed by Laurel Springs and the township was dissolved.

== See also ==
- List of historical Camden County, New Jersey municipalities
