= Lindenwold, New Jersey =

Borough in Camden County, New Jersey, US

- Borough
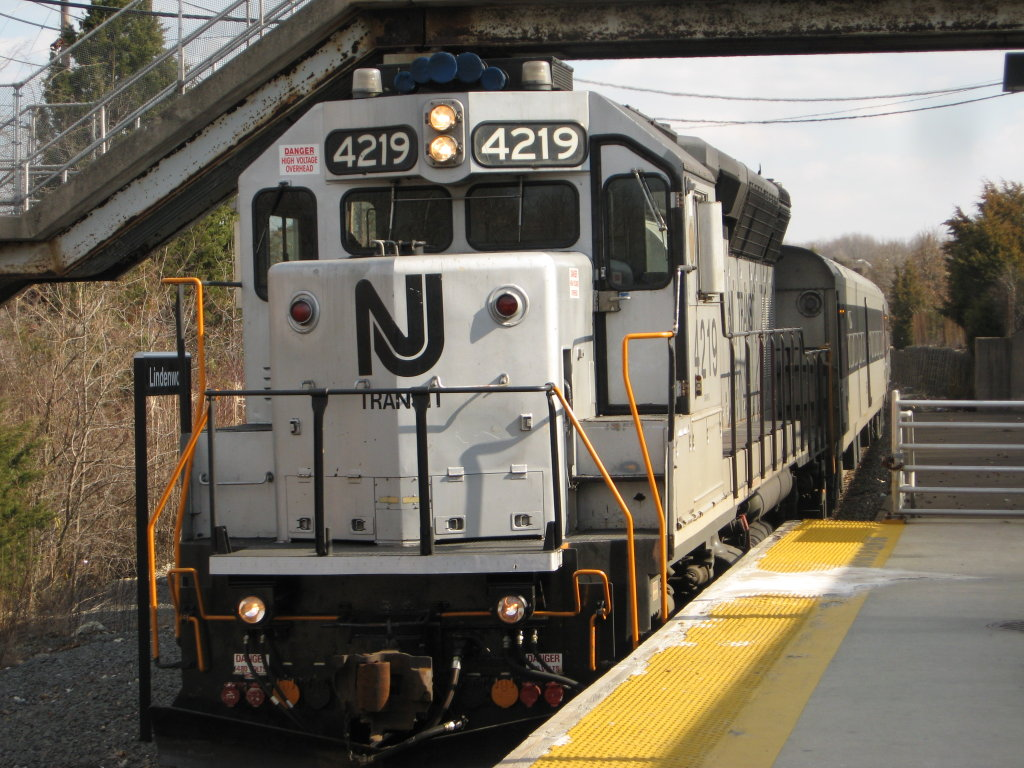
- Train pulls into Lindenwold station, March 2008

- Seal

- Lindenwold highlighted in Camden County. Inset: Location of Camden County in the State of New Jersey.

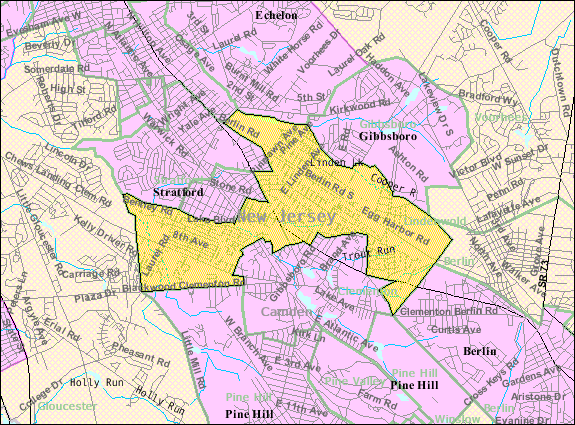
- Census Bureau map of Lindenwold, New Jersey

- Location in Camden County Location in New Jersey Location in the United States
- Coordinates: 39.818832°N 74.989966°W
- Country: United States
- State: New Jersey
- County: Camden
- Incorporated: April 23, 1929

Government
  - Type: Borough
  - Body: Borough Council
  - Mayor: Richard E. Roach Jr. (D term ends December 31, 2027)
  - Administrator: Dawn S. Thompson
  - Municipal clerk: Deborah Jackson

Area
  - Total: 3.94 sq mi (10.21 km^{2})
  - Land: 3.90 sq mi (10.11 km^{2})
  - Water: 0.042 sq mi (0.11 km^{2}) 1.07%
  - Rank: 300th of 565 in state 9th of 37 in county
- Elevation: 56 ft (17 m)

Population (2020)
  - Total: 21,641
  - Estimate (2023): 21,685
  - Rank: 129th of 565 in state 7th of 37 in county
  - Density: 5,546.1/sq mi (2,141.4/km^{2})
  - Rank: 99th of 565 in state 9th of 37 in county
- Time zone: UTC−05:00 (Eastern (EST))
  - Summer (DST): UTC−04:00 (Eastern (EDT))
- ZIP Code: 08021
- Area code: 856
- FIPS code: 3400740440
- GNIS feature ID: 0885279
- Website: www.lindenwoldnj.gov

Lindenwold is a borough in Camden County, in the U.S. state of New Jersey. As of the 2020 United States census, the borough's population was 21,641, an increase of 4,028 (+22.9%) from the 2010 census count of 17,613, which in turn reflected an increase of 199 (+1.1%) from the 17,414 counted in the 2000 census.

As of 2020, Lindenwold had the 10th-highest property tax rate in New Jersey with an equalized rate of 4.810% compared to 3.470% in the county as a whole and a statewide average of 2.279%. The borough is part of the South Jersey region of the state.

== History ==
Lindenwold was created on April 23, 1929, from Clementon Township, one of seven municipalities created from the now-defunct township, and one of five new municipalities created on that same date: Hi-Nella, Pine Hill, Pine Valley (since merged with Pine Hill), and Somerdale. The borough's first official meeting was held on the following May 31 in the old Fire Hall at Linden Avenue and Berlin Road. The name "Lindenwold" (German for "linden forest") was suggested by Wimer Bedford, a local resident who had been reading a German book that included the word. Bedford sought to have linden trees planted along the borough's streets, but local officials chose cheaper trees as an alternative.

== Geography ==
According to the U.S. Census Bureau, the borough had a total area of 3.94 square miles (10.21 km^{2}), including 3.90 square miles (10.11 km^{2}) of land and 0.04 square miles (0.11 km^{2}) of water (1.07%). Unincorporated communities, localities and place names located partially or completely within the township include Kirkwood and Lucastown.

Lindenwold borders the Camden County municipalities of Berlin Borough, Berlin Township, Clementon Borough, Gibbsboro, Gloucester Township, Laurel Springs, Pine Hill, Somerdale, Stratford, and Voorhees Township.

== Demographics ==
Historical population
Census	Pop.	Note	%±
1930	2,523		—
1940	2,552		1.1%
1950	3,479		36.3%
1960	7,335		110.8%
1970	12,199		66.3%
1980	18,196		49.2%
1990	18,734		3.0%
2000	17,414		−7.0%
2010	17,613		1.1%
2020	21,641		22.9%
2023 (est.)	21,685	▲	0.2%
Population sources: 1930–2000 1930; 1940–2000 2000; 2010 2020

=== 2020 census ===
As of the 2020 census, Lindenwold had a population of 21,641. The median age was 34.0 years. 24.0% of residents were under the age of 18 and 11.6% of residents were 65 years of age or older. For every 100 females there were 89.2 males, and for every 100 females age 18 and over there were 84.8 males age 18 and over.

100.0% of residents lived in urban areas, while 0.0% lived in rural areas.

There were 9,134 households in Lindenwold, of which 29.9% had children under the age of 18 living in them. Of all households, 27.2% were married-couple households, 22.2% were households with a male householder and no spouse or partner present, and 38.7% were households with a female householder and no spouse or partner present. About 35.4% of all households were made up of individuals and 10.0% had someone living alone who was 65 years of age or older.

There were 9,731 housing units, of which 6.1% were vacant. The homeowner vacancy rate was 2.5% and the rental vacancy rate was 5.1%.

Racial composition as of the 2020 census
Race	Number	Percent
White	6,590	30.5%
Black or African American	7,428	34.3%
American Indian and Alaska Native	183	0.8%
Asian	543	2.5%
Native Hawaiian and Other Pacific Islander	8	0.0%
Some other race	4,735	21.9%
Two or more races	2,154	10.0%
Hispanic or Latino (of any race)	7,125	32.9%

=== 2010 census ===
The 2010 United States census counted 17,613 people, 7,426 households, and 4,211 families in the borough. The population density was 4,525.1 per square mile (1,747.2/km^{2}). There were 8,251 housing units at an average density of 2,119.8 per square mile (818.5/km^{2}). The racial makeup was 48.08% (8,469) White, 34.66% (6,104) Black or African American, 0.44% (78) Native American, 2.80% (493) Asian, 0.02% (4) Pacific Islander, 10.34% (1,822) from other races, and 3.65% (643) from two or more races. Hispanic or Latino of any race were 20.85% (3,673) of the population.

Of the 7,426 households, 26.5% had children under the age of 18; 30.9% were married couples living together; 18.8% had a female householder with no husband present and 43.3% were non-families. Of all households, 33.8% were made up of individuals and 8.2% had someone living alone who was 65 years of age or older. The average household size was 2.37 and the average family size was 3.04.

22.5% of the population were under the age of 18, 11.2% from 18 to 24, 32.5% from 25 to 44, 24.4% from 45 to 64, and 9.4% who were 65 years of age or older. The median age was 33.3 years. For every 100 females, the population had 90.6 males. For every 100 females ages 18 and older there were 87.9 males.

The Census Bureau's 2006–2010 American Community Survey showed that (in 2010 inflation-adjusted dollars) median household income was $47,462 (with a margin of error of +/− $2,694) and the median family income was $55,906 (+/− $3,257). Males had a median income of $34,580 (+/− $5,293) versus $35,523 (+/− $3,099) for females. The per capita income for the borough was $22,793 (+/− $1,111). About 9.8% of families and 11.1% of the population were below the poverty line, including 15.0% of those under age 18 and 4.4% of those age 65 or over.

=== 2000 census ===
As of the 2000 census, there were 17,414 people, 7,465 households, and 4,299 families residing in the borough. The population density was 4,415.5 inhabitants per square mile (1,704.8/km^{2}). There were 8,244 housing units at an average density of 2,090.3 per square mile (807.1/km^{2}). The racial makeup of the borough was 61.42% White, 28.22% African American, 0.48% Native American, 3.53% Asian, 0.06% Pacific Islander, 3.24% from other races, and 3.06% from two or more races. Hispanic or Latino of any race were 7.56% of the population.

There were 7,465 households, out of which 29.1% had children under the age of 18 living with them, 35.0% were married couples living together, 16.6% had a female householder with no husband present, and 42.4% were non-families. 34.3% of all households were made up of individuals, and 7.0% had someone living alone who was 65 years of age or older. The average household size was 2.32 and the average family size was 3.00.

In the borough, the population was spread out, with 23.6% under the age of 18, 10.4% from 18 to 24, 36.2% from 25 to 44, 20.9% from 45 to 64, and 8.8% who were 65 years of age or older. The median age was 33 years. For every 100 females, there were 91.3 males. For every 100 females age 18 and over, there were 87.8 males.

The median income for a household in the borough was $36,080, and the median income for a family was $40,931. Males had a median income of $34,990 versus $26,514 for females. The per capita income for the borough was $18,659. About 11.3% of families and 11.8% of the population were below the poverty line, including 15.1% of those under age 18 and 5.1% of those age 65 or over.

== Government ==
=== Local government ===
Lindenwold is governed under the borough form of New Jersey municipal government, which is used in 218 municipalities (of the 564) statewide, making it the most common form of government in New Jersey. The governing body is comprised of the mayor and the borough council, with all positions elected at-large on a partisan basis as part of the November general election. A mayor is elected directly by the voters to a four-year term of office. The borough council has six members elected to serve three-year terms on a staggered basis, with two seats coming up for election each year in a three-year cycle. The borough form of government used by Lindenwold is a "weak mayor / strong council" government in which council members act as the legislative body with the mayor presiding at meetings and voting only in the event of a tie. The mayor can veto ordinances subject to an override by a two-thirds majority vote of the council. The mayor makes committee and liaison assignments for council members, and most appointments are made by the mayor with the advice and consent of the council.

In the November 2021 general election, Walter F. Lenkowski was elected to fill the seat expiring in December 2022 that had been held by Joseph C. Strippoli until he resigned from office in July 2021.

As of 2023, the mayor of Lindenwold Borough is Democrat Richard E. Roach Jr., whose term of office ends December 31, 2023. Members of the Lindenwold Borough Council are Linda M. Hess (D, 2023), Walter F. Lenkowski (D, 2025), Raymond D. Morrisey (D, 2025), Odessa Patton (2024), Cheryle Randolph-Sharpe (D, 2024), Sandra Sinon (D, 2023).

The borough of Lindenwold is serviced by Ambulnz (formally Jefferson Health) EMS 24/7. EMS is staffed with two NJ State Certified EMTs who operate as BLS 63 daily. EMS also covers the neighboring borough Clementon.

=== Federal, state, and county representation ===
Lindenwold is located in the 1st Congressional District and is part of New Jersey's 6th state legislative district.

For the 119th United States Congress, New Jersey's 1st congressional district is represented by Donald Norcross (D, Camden). New Jersey is represented in the United States Senate by Democrats Cory Booker (Newark, term ends 2027) and Andy Kim (Moorestown, term ends 2031).

For the 2026–2027 session, the 6th legislative district of the New Jersey Legislature is represented in the State Senate by James Beach (D, Voorhees Township) and in the General Assembly by Louis Greenwald (D, Voorhees Township) and Melinda Kane (D, Cherry Hill).

Camden County is governed by a Board of County Commissioners composed of seven members chosen at-large in partisan elections for three-year terms on a staggered basis by the residents of the county, with either two or three seats up for election each year as part of the November general election. At a reorganization meeting held in January after each election, the newly constituted Board of Commissioners selects one member to serve as Director and another as Deputy Director, each serving a one-year term in that role. As of 2025, Camden County's Commissioners are: Commissioner Director Louis Cappelli Jr. (D, Collingswood, 2026), Commissioner Deputy Director Edward T. McDonnell (D, Pennsauken Township, 2025), Virginia Ruiz Betteridge (D, Runnemede, 2025), Almar Dyer (D, Pennsauken Township, 2027), Melinda Kane (D, Cherry Hill, 2027), Jeffrey L. Nash (D, Winslow Township, 2027), and Jonathan L. Young Sr. (D, Berlin Township, 2026).

Camden County's constitutional officers are: Clerk Pamela Rosen Lampitt (D, Cherry Hill, 2029) Sheriff Chuck Billingham (D, Gloucester City, 2027) and Surrogate Michelle Gentek-Mayer (D, Gloucester Township, 2025).

=== Politics ===
As of March 2011, there were a total of 9,970 registered voters in Lindenwood, of which 4,510 (45.2%) were registered as Democrats, 714 (7.2%) were registered as Republicans and 4,742 (47.6%) were registered as Unaffiliated. There were 4 voters registered as Libertarians or Greens.

Gubernatorial election results for Lindenwold
Year	Republican		Democratic		Third party(ies)	
Year	No.	%	No.	%	No.	%
2025	1,007	22.55%	3,411	76.39%	47	1.05%
2021	906	27.26%	2,377	71.51%	41	1.23%
2017	587	21.43%	2,091	76.34%	61	2.23%
2013	1,221	45.68%	1,406	52.60%	46	1.72%
2009	927	30.62%	1,871	61.81%	229	7.57%
2005	816	28.24%	1,925	66.61%	149	5.16%

In the 2012 presidential election, Democrat Barack Obama received 80.2% of the vote (4,936 cast), ahead of Republican Mitt Romney with 18.7% (1,152 votes), and other candidates with 1.1% (67 votes), among the 6,206 ballots cast by the borough's 10,991 registered voters (51 ballots were spoiled), for a turnout of 56.5%. In the 2008 presidential election, Democrat Barack Obama received 76.4% of the vote (5,208 cast), ahead of Republican John McCain, who received around 20.5% (1,400 votes), with 6,813 ballots cast among the borough's 9,556 registered voters, for a turnout of 71.3%. In the 2004 presidential election, Democrat John Kerry received 71.1% of the vote (4,295 ballots cast), outpolling Republican George W. Bush, who received around 27.3% (1,650 votes), with 6,042 ballots cast among the borough's 9,306 registered voters, for a turnout percentage of 64.9.

United States presidential election results for Lindenwold
Year	Republican		Democratic		Third party(ies)	
Year	No.	%	No.	%	No.	%
2024	1,667	27.34%	4,347	71.30%	83	1.36%
2020	1,592	22.86%	5,292	76.00%	79	1.13%
2016	1,350	22.68%	4,416	74.19%	186	3.13%
2012	1,152	18.72%	4,936	80.19%	67	1.09%
2008	1,400	20.55%	5,208	76.44%	205	3.01%
2004	1,650	27.07%	4,295	70.47%	150	2.46%

In the 2013 gubernatorial election, Democrat Barbara Buono received 52.6% of the vote (1,406 cast), ahead of Republican Chris Christie with 45.7% (1,221 votes), and other candidates with 1.7% (46 votes), among the 2,744 ballots cast by the borough's 11,121 registered voters (71 ballots were spoiled), for a turnout of 24.7%. In the 2009 gubernatorial election, Democrat Jon Corzine received 61.8% of the vote (1,871 ballots cast), ahead of both Republican Chris Christie with 30.6% (927 votes) and Independent Chris Daggett with 4.5% (135 votes), with 3,027 ballots cast among the borough's 9,848 registered voters, yielding a 30.7% turnout.

United States Senate election results for Lindenwold1
Year	Republican		Democratic		Third party(ies)	
Year	No.	%	No.	%	No.	%
2024	1,447	24.55%	4,346	73.72%	102	1.73%
2018	963	21.92%	3,157	71.85%	274	6.24%
2012	1,054	18.01%	4,729	80.80%	70	1.20%
2006	799	26.42%	2,110	69.78%	115	3.80%

United States Senate election results for Lindenwold2
Year	Republican		Democratic		Third party(ies)	
Year	No.	%	No.	%	No.	%
2020	1,490	21.73%	5,301	77.31%	66	0.96%
2014	618	22.45%	2,101	76.32%	34	1.24%
2013	430	23.67%	1,375	75.67%	12	0.66%
2008	1,252	20.34%	4,826	78.42%	76	1.23%

== Education ==
The Lindenwold Public Schools serve students in pre-kindergarten through twelfth grade. As of the 2022–23 school year, the district, comprised of five schools, had an enrollment of 3,100 students and 255.5 classroom teachers (on an FTE basis), for a student–teacher ratio of 12.1:1. Schools in the district (with 2022–23 enrollment data from the National Center for Education Statistics) are Lindenwold Preschool with 171 students in PreK, Lindenwold School 4 with 593 students in grades K-4, Lindenwold School 5 with 656 students in grades K-4, Lindenwold Middle School with 911 students in grades 5-8 and Lindenwold High School with 727 students in grades 9-12.

At the end of the 2007–08 school year, the Roman Catholic Diocese of Camden closed Saint Lawrence Regional School and merged it together with schools in Somerdale and Stratford to create John Paul II Regional School.

== Transportation ==
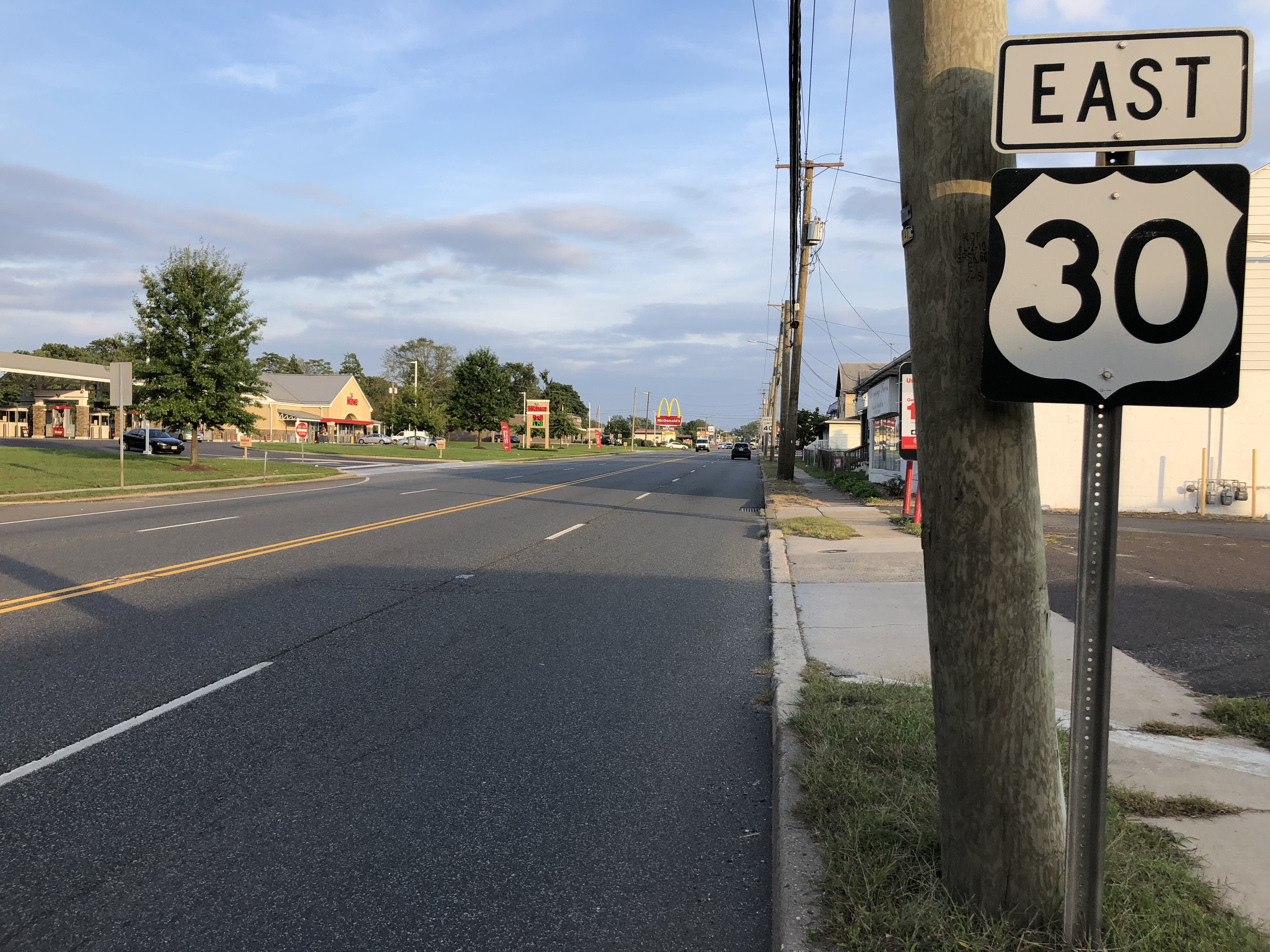
U.S. Route 30 eastbound in Lindenwold

=== Roads and highways ===
As of May 2010, the borough had a total of 44.90 miles (72.26 km) of roadways, of which 31.41 miles (50.55 km) were maintained by the municipality, 12.14 miles (19.54 km) by Camden County and 1.35 miles (2.17 km) by the New Jersey Department of Transportation.

U.S. Route 30 is the main highway serving Lindenwold.

=== Public transportation ===
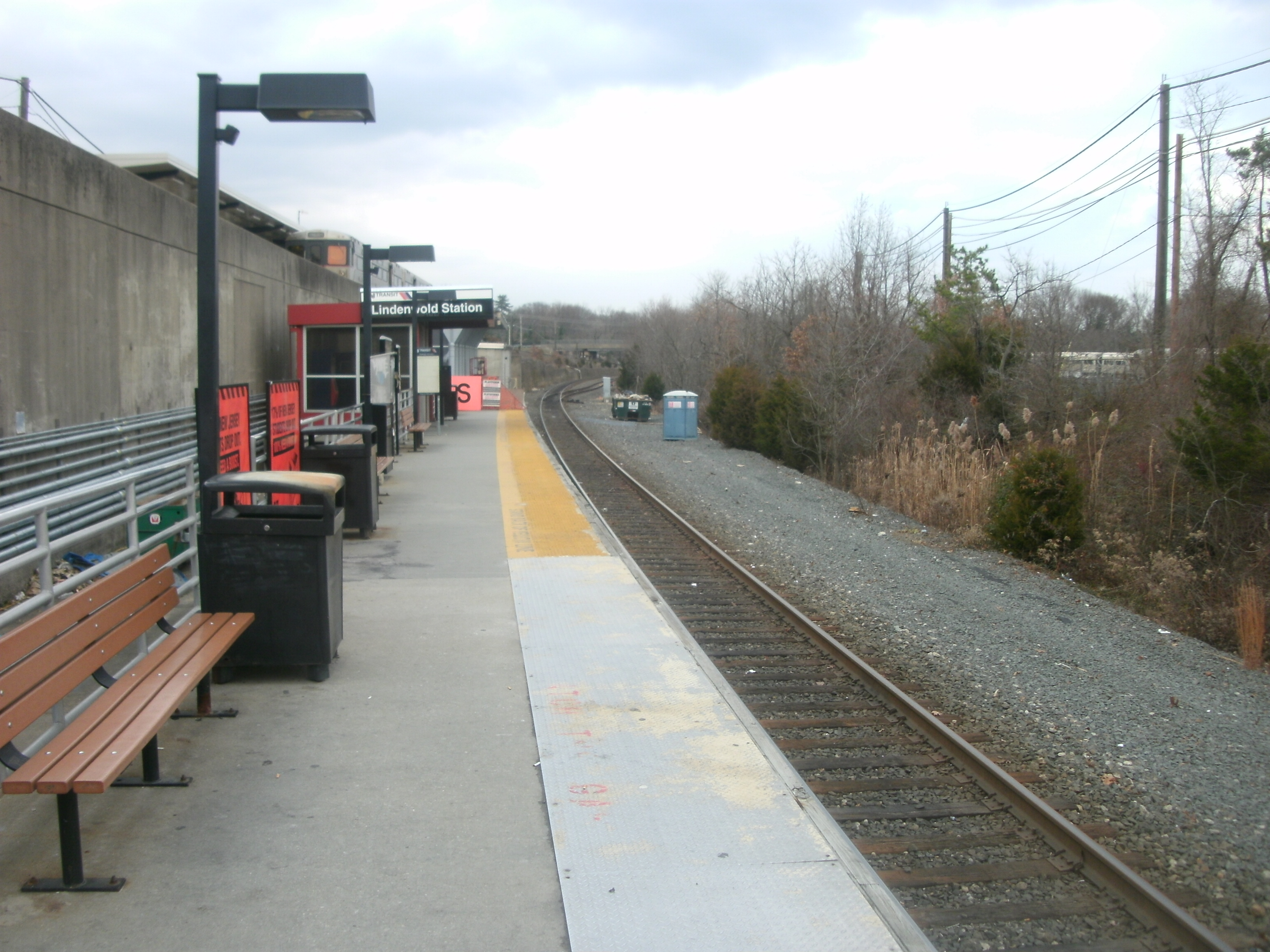
Lindenwold station, which is served by NJ Transit's Atlantic City Line and the PATCO Speedline

The Lindenwold station is home to the eastern terminus and main operations facility for the PATCO Speedline. It is also a stop on NJ Transit's Atlantic City Line, which runs from 30th Street Station in Philadelphia to the Atlantic City Rail Terminal.

NJ Transit offers bus service between the borough and Camden on the 403 route, with local service on the 451 and 459 routes, and service to Atlantic City on the 554.

== Notable people ==
People who were born in, residents of, or otherwise closely associated with Lindenwold include:

- Earl Harrison (born 1961), former professional basketball player
- Suzy Hotrod (born 1980), roller derby skater
- Carlton R. Rouh (1919–1977), Medal of Honor recipient
- Jimmy Woode (1926–2005), jazz bassist
