= Stratford, New Jersey =

Borough in Camden County, New Jersey, US

- Borough
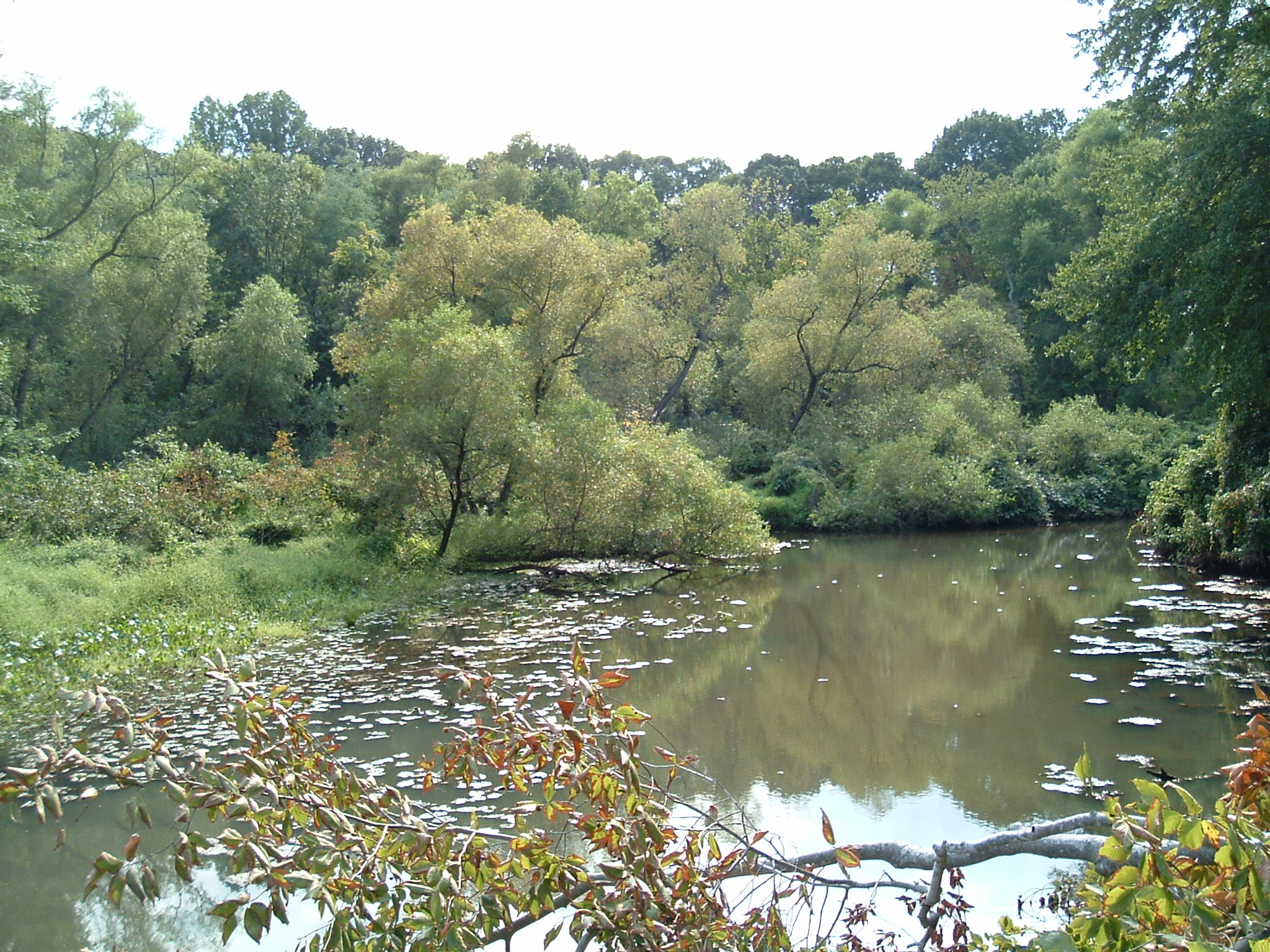
- Big Timber Creek in Stratford

- Seal

- Location of Stratford in Camden County highlighted in red (right). Inset map: Location of Camden County in New Jersey highlighted in orange (left).

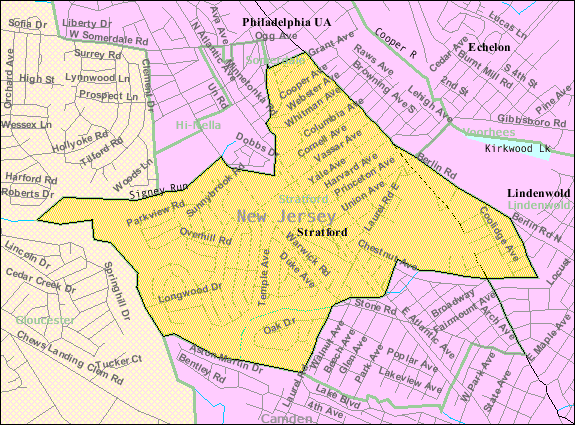
- Census Bureau map of Stratford, New Jersey

- Location in Camden County Location in New Jersey Location in the United States
- Coordinates: 39.82899°N 75.015536°W
- Country: United States
- State: New Jersey
- County: Camden
- Incorporated: February 13, 1925
- Named for: Stratford-upon-Avon, England

Government
  - Type: Borough
  - Body: Borough Council
  - Mayor: Linda Hall (D, term ends December 31, 2027)
  - Administrator: John D. Keenan Jr.
  - Municipal clerk: Michelle Hack

Area
  - Total: 1.57 sq mi (4.07 km^{2})
  - Land: 1.57 sq mi (4.07 km^{2})
  - Water: 0 sq mi (0.00 km^{2}) 0.00%
  - Rank: 445th of 565 in state 22nd of 37 in county
- Elevation: 79 ft (24 m)

Population (2020)
  - Total: 6,981
  - Estimate (2023): 7,000
  - Rank: 321st of 565 in state 20th of 37 in county
  - Density: 4,446.5/sq mi (1,716.8/km^{2})
  - Rank: 139th of 565 in state 16th of 37 in county
- Time zone: UTC−05:00 (Eastern (EST))
  - Summer (DST): UTC−04:00 (Eastern (EDT))
- ZIP Code: 08084
- Area code: 856
- FIPS code: 3400771220
- GNIS feature ID: 0885411
- Website: www.stratfordnj.org

Stratford is a borough in Camden County, in the U.S. state of New Jersey. As of the 2020 United States census, the borough's population was 6,981, a decrease of 59 (−0.8%) from the 2010 census count of 7,040, which in turn reflected a decline of 231 (−3.2%) from the 7,271 counted in the 2000 census. Rowan-Virtua School of Osteopathic Medicine is located in Stratford.

== Geography ==
According to the U.S. Census Bureau, the borough had a total area of 1.57 square miles (4.07 km^{2}), all of which was land.

The borough borders Gloucester Township (north and east), Hi-Nella (north), Laurel Springs (south), Lindenwold (south and west), and Somerdale (west).

== History ==
The earliest colonial settlers concentrated around the White Horse Tavern in the 1740s, around which the small village of White Horse emerged. The only remaining building of this early village is the Stratford Quaker Store.

In the 1880s, the Rural Land Improvement Company began developing the area known as "Old Stratford" and renamed the village after Stratford-upon-Avon, England.

The Borough of Stratford was officially formed on February 13, 1925, from portions of Clementon Township, one of seven municipalities carved from the township.

In the 1960s, Hunt's farm was sold to developers and the Laurel Mill Farms housing development was formed adjacent to the North Branch of Big Timber Creek.

== Demographics ==
Historical population
Census	Pop.	Note	%±
1930	958		—
1940	980		2.3%
1950	1,356		38.4%
1960	4,308		217.7%
1970	9,801		127.5%
1980	8,005		−18.3%
1990	7,614		−4.9%
2000	7,271		−4.5%
2010	7,040		−3.2%
2020	6,981		−0.8%
2023 (est.)	7,000	▲	0.3%
Population sources: 1930–2000 1930; 1940–2000 2000; 2010 2020

=== 2020 census ===
As of the 2020 census, the borough had a population of 6,981. The median age was 40.7 years. 21.0% of residents were under the age of 18 and 16.7% were 65 years of age or older. For every 100 females, there were 96.8 males, and for every 100 females age 18 and over, there were 93.1 males.

100.0% of residents lived in urban areas, while 0.0% lived in rural areas.

There were 2,680 households in the borough, of which 30.8% had children under the age of 18 living in them. Of all households, 48.4% were married-couple households, 16.8% were households with a male householder and no spouse or partner present, and 27.4% were households with a female householder and no spouse or partner present. About 26.2% of all households were made up of individuals, and 10.1% had someone living alone who was 65 years of age or older.

There were 2,791 housing units, of which 4.0% were vacant. The homeowner vacancy rate was 1.8% and the rental vacancy rate was 4.9%.

Racial composition as of the 2020 census
Race	Number	Percent
White	5,063	72.5%
Black or African American	736	10.5%
American Indian and Alaska Native	36	0.5%
Asian	330	4.7%
Native Hawaiian and Other Pacific Islander	4	0.1%
Some other race	328	4.7%
Two or more races	484	6.9%
Hispanic or Latino (of any race)	712	10.2%

=== 2010 census ===
The 2010 United States census counted 7,040 people, 2,641 households, and 1,822 families in the borough. The population density was 4,547.0 per square mile (1,755.6/km^{2}). There were 2,761 housing units at an average density of 1,783.3 per square mile (688.5/km^{2}). The racial makeup was 82.37% (5,799) White, 8.24% (580) Black or African American, 0.18% (13) Native American, 4.22% (297) Asian, 0.07% (5) Pacific Islander, 2.77% (195) from other races, and 2.14% (151) from two or more races. Hispanic or Latino of any race were 6.49% (457) of the population.

Of the 2,641 households, 31.1% had children under the age of 18; 51.8% were married couples living together; 12.5% had a female householder with no husband present and 31.0% were non-families. Of all households, 25.6% were made up of individuals and 8.7% had someone living alone who was 65 years of age or older. The average household size was 2.64 and the average family size was 3.19.

23.3% of the population were under the age of 18, 9.1% from 18 to 24, 26.5% from 25 to 44, 26.7% from 45 to 64, and 14.3% who were 65 years of age or older. The median age was 39.1 years. For every 100 females, the population had 95.8 males. For every 100 females ages 18 and older there were 92.9 males.

The Census Bureau's 2006–2010 American Community Survey showed that (in 2010 inflation-adjusted dollars) median household income was $64,297 (with a margin of error of +/− $6,575) and the median family income was $86,375 (+/− $11,140). Males had a median income of $63,879 (+/− $4,823) versus $40,243 (+/− $1,924) for females. The per capita income for the borough was $32,383 (+/− $3,556). About 4.3% of families and 6.9% of the population were below the poverty line, including 9.4% of those under age 18 and 3.7% of those age 65 or over.

=== 2000 census ===
As of the 2000 U.S. census, there were 7,271 people, 2,736 households, and 1,906 families residing in the borough. The population density was 4,603.8 inhabitants per square mile (1,777.5/km^{2}). There were 2,849 housing units at an average density of 1,803.9 per square mile (696.5/km^{2}). The racial makeup of the borough was 88.56% White, 6.60% African American, 0.12% Native American, 2.38% Asian, 0.01% Pacific Islander, 0.87% from other races, and 1.46% from two or more races. Hispanic or Latino of any race were 3.81% of the population.

There were 2,736 households, out of which 31.8% had children under the age of 18 living with them, 54.0% were married couples living together, 11.8% had a female householder with no husband present, and 30.3% were non-families. 25.8% of all households were made up of individuals, and 8.9% had someone living alone who was 65 years of age or older. The average household size was 2.61 and the average family size was 3.18.

In the borough, the population was spread out, with 24.7% under the age of 18, 8.1% from 18 to 24, 29.8% from 25 to 44, 21.6% from 45 to 64, and 15.8% who were 65 years of age or older. The median age was 38 years. For every 100 females, there were 95.1 males. For every 100 females age 18 and over, there were 89.3 males.

The median income for a household in the borough was $50,977, and the median income for a family was $57,500. Males had a median income of $42,246 versus $29,153 for females. The per capita income for the borough was $21,748. About 2.5% of families and 4.6% of the population were below the poverty line, including 3.8% of those under age 18 and 4.4% of those age 65 or over.

== Government ==
=== Local government ===
Stratford is governed under the borough form of New Jersey municipal government, which is used in 218 municipalities (of the 564) statewide, making it the most common form of government in New Jersey. The governing body is comprised of a mayor and a borough council, with all positions elected at-large on a partisan basis as part of the November general election. A mayor is elected directly by the voters to a four-year term of office. The borough council includes six members elected to serve three-year terms on a staggered basis, with two seats coming up for election each year in a three-year cycle. The borough form of government used by Stratford is a "weak mayor / strong council" government in which council members act as the legislative body with the mayor presiding at meetings and voting only in the event of a tie. The mayor can veto ordinances subject to an override by a two-thirds majority vote of the council. The mayor makes committee and liaison assignments for council members, and most appointments are made by the mayor with the advice and consent of the council.

As of 2025, the mayor of Stratford is Democrat Linda Hall. Members of the Stratford Borough Council are Council President Stephen C. Gandy (D, 2024), Patrick Gilligan (D, 2023), Linda Hall (D, 2025), James Kelly (D, 2024), Tina Lomanno (D, 2025) and Michael G. Tolomeo (D, 2023).

=== Federal, state and county representation ===
Stratford is located in the 1st Congressional District and is part of New Jersey's 6th state legislative district.

For the 119th United States Congress, New Jersey's 1st congressional district is represented by Donald Norcross (D, Camden). New Jersey is represented in the United States Senate by Democrats Cory Booker (Newark, term ends 2027) and Andy Kim (Moorestown, term ends 2031).

For the 2026–2027 session, the 6th legislative district of the New Jersey Legislature is represented in the State Senate by James Beach (D, Voorhees Township) and in the General Assembly by Louis Greenwald (D, Voorhees Township) and Melinda Kane (D, Cherry Hill).

Camden County is governed by a Board of County Commissioners composed of seven members chosen at-large in partisan elections for three-year terms on a staggered basis by the residents of the county, with either two or three seats up for election each year as part of the November general election. At a reorganization meeting held in January after each election, the newly constituted Board of Commissioners selects one member to serve as Director and another as Deputy Director, each serving a one-year term in that role. As of 2025, Camden County's Commissioners are: Commissioner Director Louis Cappelli Jr. (D, Collingswood, 2026), Commissioner Deputy Director Edward T. McDonnell (D, Pennsauken Township, 2025), Virginia Ruiz Betteridge (D, Runnemede, 2025), Almar Dyer (D, Pennsauken Township, 2027), Melinda Kane (D, Cherry Hill, 2027), Jeffrey L. Nash (D, Winslow Township, 2027), and Jonathan L. Young Sr. (D, Berlin Township, 2026).

Camden County's constitutional officers are: Clerk Pamela Rosen Lampitt (D, Cherry Hill, 2029) Sheriff Chuck Billingham (D, Gloucester City, 2027) and Surrogate Michelle Gentek-Mayer (D, Gloucester Township, 2025).

=== Politics ===
As of March 2011, there were a total of 4,606 registered voters in Stratford, of which 1,743 (37.8%) were registered as Democrats, 849 (18.4%) were registered as Republicans and 2,013 (43.7%) were registered as Unaffiliated. There was one voter registered to another party.

Gubernatorial election results for Stratford
Year	Republican		Democratic		Third party(ies)	
Year	No.	%	No.	%	No.	%
2025	1,092	37.73%	1,783	61.61%	19	0.66%
2021	1,061	45.01%	1,272	53.97%	24	1.02%
2017	676	38.28%	1,053	59.63%	37	2.10%
2013	1,340	67.00%	628	31.40%	32	1.60%
2009	1,005	45.87%	988	45.09%	198	9.04%
2005	991	44.24%	1,123	50.13%	126	5.63%

In the 2012 presidential election, Democrat Barack Obama received 59.0% of the vote (1,911 cast), ahead of Republican Mitt Romney with 39.6% (1,282 votes), and other candidates with 1.5% (48 votes), among the 3,271 ballots cast by the borough's 4,925 registered voters (30 ballots were spoiled), for a turnout of 66.4%. In the 2008 presidential election, Democrat Barack Obama received 56.8% of the vote (2,006 cast), ahead of Republican John McCain, who received around 39.9% (1,409 votes), with 3,534 ballots cast among the borough's 4,639 registered voters, for a turnout of 76.2%. In the 2004 presidential election, Democrat John Kerry received 54.0% of the vote (1,886 ballots cast), outpolling Republican George W. Bush, who received around 44.3% (1,547 votes), with 3,492 ballots cast among the borough's 4,629 registered voters, for a turnout percentage of 75.4.

United States presidential election results for Stratford
Year	Republican		Democratic		Third party(ies)	
Year	No.	%	No.	%	No.	%
2024	1,533	41.59%	2,100	56.97%	53	1.44%
2020	1,555	39.21%	2,338	58.95%	73	1.84%
2016	1,360	41.70%	1,757	53.88%	144	4.42%
2012	1,282	39.56%	1,911	58.96%	48	1.48%
2008	1,409	39.87%	2,006	56.76%	119	3.37%
2004	1,547	44.30%	1,886	54.01%	59	1.69%

In the 2013 gubernatorial election, Republican Chris Christie received 67.0% of the vote (1,340 cast), ahead of Democrat Barbara Buono with 31.4% (628 votes), and other candidates with 1.6% (32 votes), among the 2,056 ballots cast by the borough's 4,945 registered voters (56 ballots were spoiled), for a turnout of 41.6%. In the 2009 gubernatorial election, Republican Chris Christie received 45.9% of the vote (1,005 ballots cast), ahead of both Democrat Jon Corzine with 45.1% (988 votes) and Independent Chris Daggett with 5.3% (116 votes), with 2,191 ballots cast among the borough's 4,630 registered voters, yielding a 47.3% turnout.

United States Senate election results for Stratford1
Year	Republican		Democratic		Third party(ies)	
Year	No.	%	No.	%	No.	%
2024	1,357	37.84%	2,172	60.57%	57	1.59%
2018	1,143	43.12%	1,341	50.58%	167	6.30%
2012	1,171	38.09%	1,855	60.34%	48	1.56%
2006	1,073	48.03%	1,102	49.33%	59	2.64%

United States Senate election results for Stratford2
Year	Republican		Democratic		Third party(ies)	
Year	No.	%	No.	%	No.	%
2020	1,526	39.17%	2,322	59.60%	48	1.23%
2014	831	45.81%	953	52.54%	30	1.65%
2013	502	51.43%	464	47.54%	10	1.02%
2008	1,322	40.23%	1,904	57.94%	60	1.83%

== Education ==
The Stratford School District serves public school students in pre-kindergarten through eighth grade. Students from Hi-Nella attend the district for Pre-K–8 as part of a sending/receiving relationship, under a five-year transition that started in 2012–13, bringing in an additional 100 students to the district. Students from Laurel Springs also attend the district's schools for grades 7 and 8 as part of a sending/receiving relationship. As of the 2022–23 school year, the district, comprised of two schools, had an enrollment of 901 students and 78.0 classroom teachers (on an FTE basis), for a student–teacher ratio of 11.6:1. Schools in the district (with 2022–23 enrollment data from the National Center for Education Statistics) are Parkview Elementary School with 384 students in pre-kindergarten through third grade and Samuel S. Yellin Elementary School with 507 students in grades 4 through 8.

For ninth grade through twelfth grade, public school students attend Sterling High School, a regional high school district that also serves students from Magnolia and Somerdale, along with the sending districts of Hi-Nella and Laurel Springs. The high school is located in Somerdale. As of the 2022–23 school year, the high school had an enrollment of 894 students and 70.0 classroom teachers (on an FTE basis), for a student–teacher ratio of 12.8:1. John Paul II Regional School is an elementary school that operates under the auspices of the Roman Catholic Diocese of Camden, having opened for the 2008–09 school year as the result of the consolidation of Our Lady of Grace, St. Luke and St. Lawrence by the Camden diocese.

The Rowan-Virtua School of Osteopathic Medicine has its campus on Laurel Road in Stratford Borough. It is made up of four buildings including the University Doctors' Pavilion and a Science Center.

Rutgers University's Biomedical and Health Sciences school has a campus in Stratford.

Stratford Classical Christian Academy, which occupied the site of the former Stratford Military Academy, served students in Kindergarten through twelfth grade until 2015, when it closed.

== Transportation ==
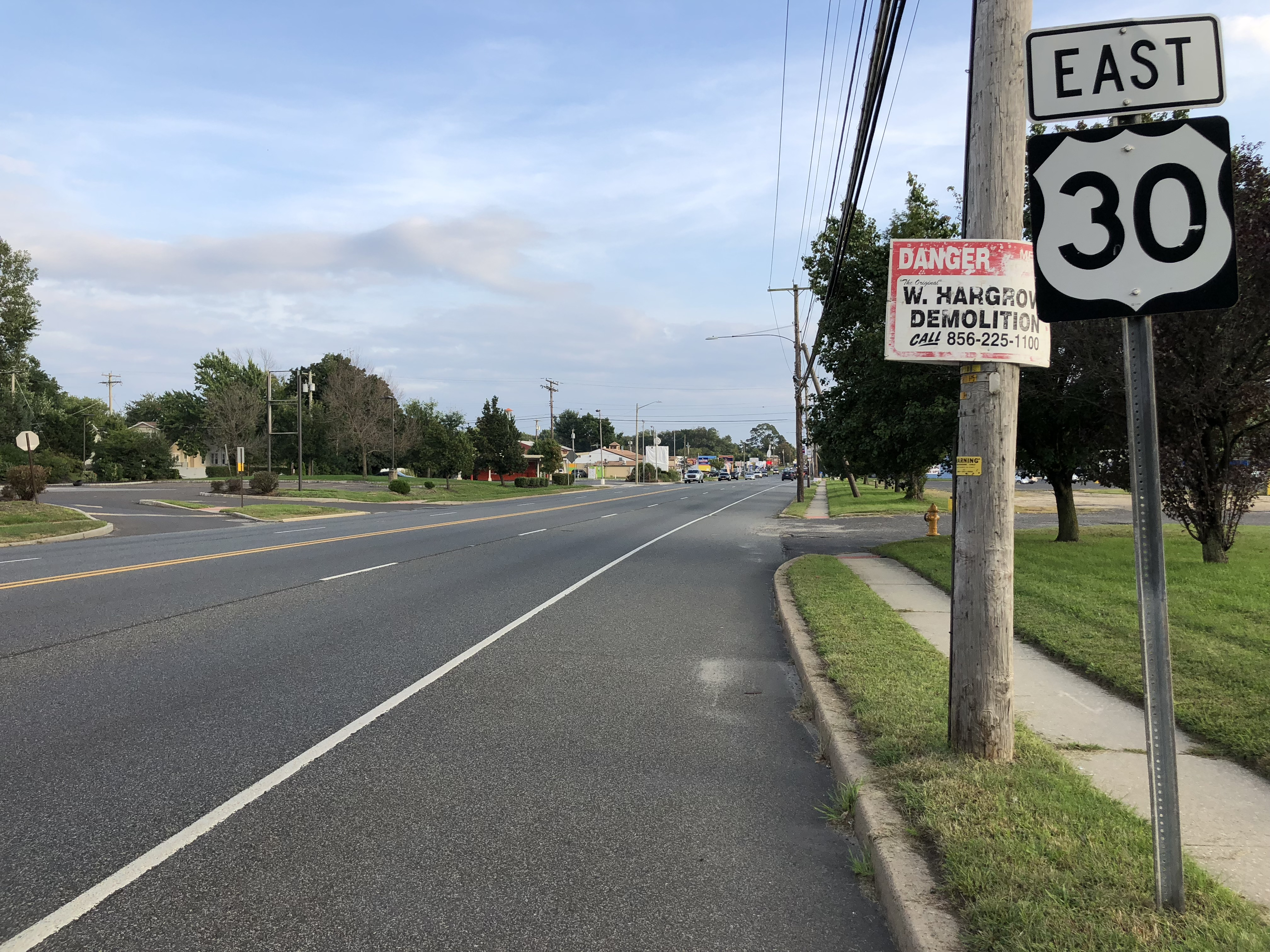
U.S. Route 30 eastbound in Stratford

=== Roads and highways ===
As of May 2010, the borough had a total of 26.09 miles (41.99 km) of roadways, of which 21.77 miles (35.04 km) were maintained by the municipality, 3.21 miles (5.17 km) by Camden County and 1.11 miles (1.79 km) by the New Jersey Department of Transportation.

U.S. Route 30 (White Horse Pike) runs from Laurel Springs in the borough's southeast corner and heads towards the northern tip of the borough along the border between Stratford to the southwest and Somerdale to the northeast before heading into Somerdale.

=== Public transportation ===
NJ Transit bus service between Turnersville and Camden is available on the 403 route, with local service available on the 459 route operatining between Voorhees Town Center and the Avandale Park and Ride in Winslow Township.

== Notable people ==
People who were born in, residents of, or otherwise closely associated with Stratford include:

- Tamika Catchings (born 1979), professional basketball player who played in the WNBA for the Indiana Fever
- Mike Daniels (born 1989), defensive end for the Green Bay Packers
- Lee DeRamus (born 1972), wide receiver who played for two seasons in the NFL with the New Orleans Saints
- Steven Ferrari (born 1962), US Army major general, lived in Stratford
- Juwan Johnson (born 1996), American football wide receiver for the New Orleans Saints of the National Football League
- Ken Kelley (born 1960), American football linebacker who played two seasons in the United States Football League with the Philadelphia Stars, Chicago Blitz and Birmingham Stallions
- Brett Laxton (born 1973), former MLB pitcher who played in parts of two seasons for the Oakland Athletics and the Kansas City Royals
- Kelly Ripa (born 1970), actress and talk show host of Live! with Kelly
- Julian Talley (born 1989), NFL wide receiver for the New York Giants
