= Hi-Nella, New Jersey =

Borough in Camden County, New Jersey, US

- Borough
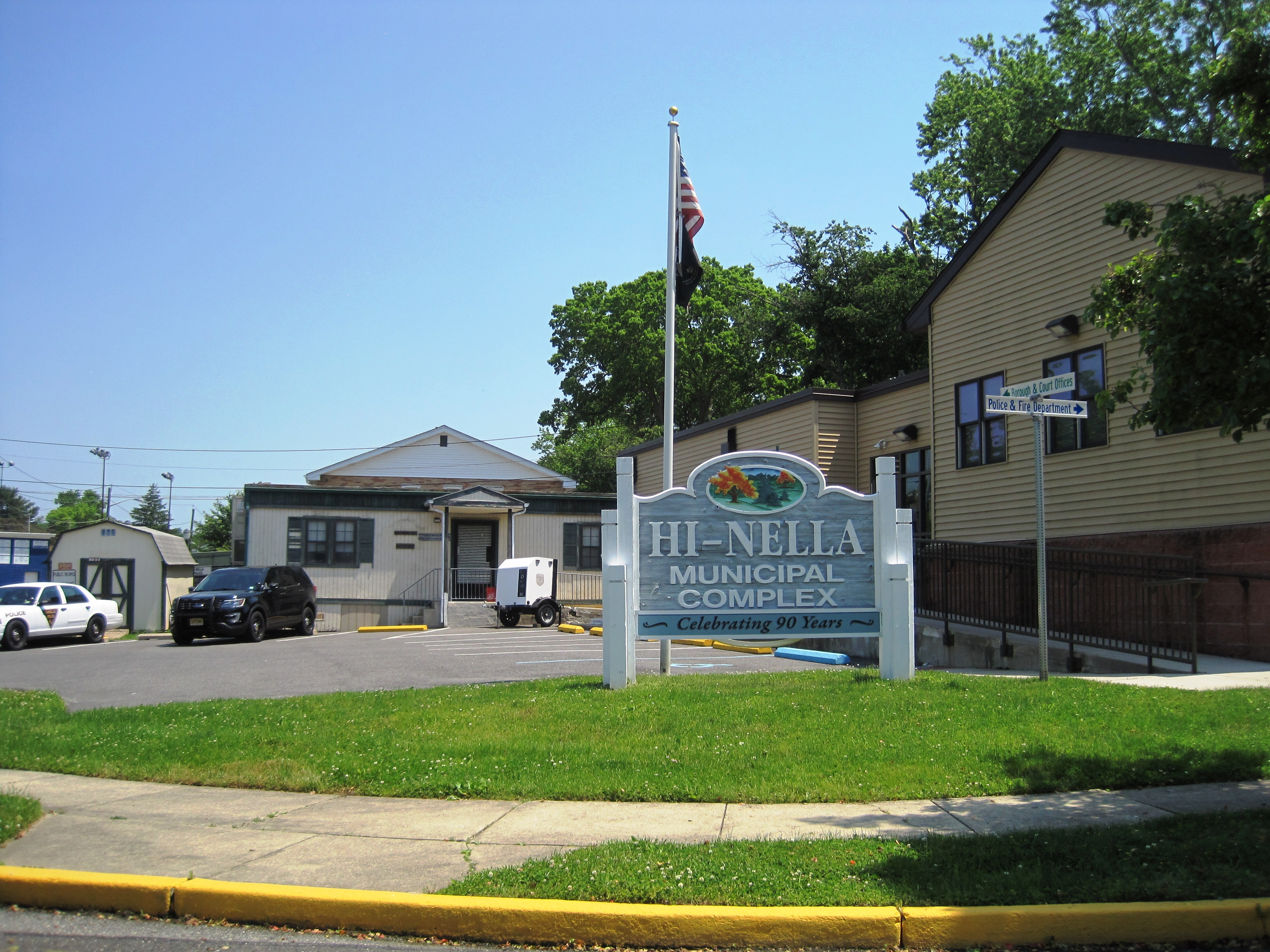
- Hi-Nella Municipal Complex

- Seal

- Hi-Nella highlighted in Camden County. Inset: Location of Camden County highlighted in the State of New Jersey.

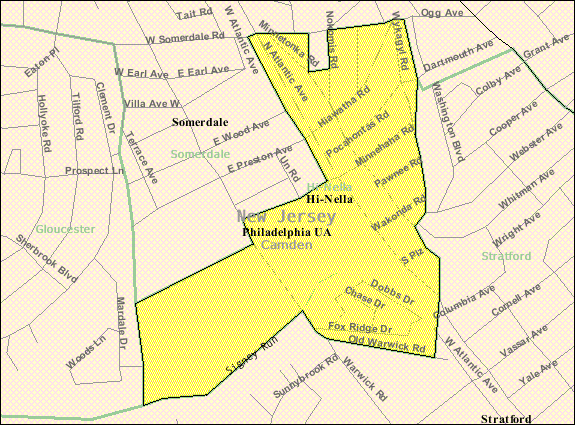
- Census Bureau map of Hi-Nella, New Jersey

- Location in Camden County Location in New Jersey Location in the United States
- Coordinates: 39.836516°N 75.021965°W
- Country: United States
- State: New Jersey
- County: Camden
- Incorporated: April 23, 1929

Government
  - Type: Borough
  - Body: Borough Council
  - Mayor: Michael J. Segeren (D, term ends December 31, 2023)
  - Municipal clerk: Phyllis Twisler

Area
  - Total: 0.22 sq mi (0.58 km^{2})
  - Land: 0.22 sq mi (0.58 km^{2})
  - Water: 0 sq mi (0.00 km^{2}) 0.00%
  - Rank: 558th of 565 in state 35th of 37 in county
- Elevation: 62 ft (19 m)

Population (2020)
  - Total: 927
  - Estimate (2023): 928
  - Rank: 535th of 565 in state 35th of 37 in county
  - Density: 4,165.1/sq mi (1,608.2/km^{2})
  - Rank: 150th of 565 in state 18th of 37 in county
- Time zone: UTC−05:00 (Eastern (EST))
  - Summer (DST): UTC−04:00 (Eastern (EDT))
- ZIP Code: 08083 – Somerdale
- Area code: 856
- FIPS code: 3400732220
- GNIS feature ID: 0885256
- Website: www.hinellaboro.org

Hi-Nella is a borough in Camden County, in the U.S. state of New Jersey. The borough is the state's ninth-smallest municipality. As of the 2020 United States census, the borough's population was 927, an increase of 57 (+6.6%) from the 2010 census count of 870, which in turn reflected a decline of 159 (−15.5%) from the 1,029 counted in the 2000 census.

The Borough of Hi-Nella was created on April 23, 1929, from portions of Clementon Township, as one of seven municipalities created from the now-defunct township, and one of five new municipalities (joining Lindenwold, Pine Hill, Pine Valley and Somerdale) created on that same date. The borough's name is traditionally said to derive from a Native American term meaning "high rolling knoll" or "high ground", though it may have been named for Nella, the wife of Lucious Parker, who developed Hi-Nella Estates in the late 1920s.

The Star-Ledger included Hi-Nella in its 2010 series of articles covering "Towns that Shouldn't Exist", citing the borough's small area, population and staff, along with its use of a double-wide trailer as a municipal building. Mayor Meredith Dobbs told The Star-Ledger that efforts to force the borough to consolidate with its neighbors would be "declared dead on arrival".

The borough had the fifth-highest property tax rate in New Jersey, with an equalized rate of 5.306% in 2020, compared to 3.470% in the county as a whole and a statewide average of 2.279%.

== Geography ==
According to the United States Census Bureau, the borough had a total area of 0.22 square miles (0.58 km^{2}), all of which was land.

Hi-Nella borders the Camden County municipalities of Gloucester Township, Somerdale and Stratford.

== Demographics ==
Historical population
Census	Pop.	Note	%±
1930	160		—
1940	203		26.9%
1950	237		16.7%
1960	474		100.0%
1970	1,195		152.1%
1980	1,250		4.6%
1990	1,045		−16.4%
2000	1,029		−1.5%
2010	870		−15.5%
2020	927		6.6%
2023 (est.)	928	▲	0.1%
Population sources: 1930–2000 1930; 1940–2000 2000; 2010 2020

=== 2010 census ===
The 2010 United States census counted 870 people, 377 households, and 216 families in the borough. The population density was 3,773.3 per square mile (1,456.9/km^{2}). There were 420 housing units at an average density of 1,821.6 per square mile (703.3/km^{2}). The racial makeup was 71.72% (624) White, 15.06% (131) Black or African American, 0.69% (6) Native American, 4.02% (35) Asian, 0.00% (0) Pacific Islander, 5.63% (49) from other races, and 2.87% (25) from two or more races. Hispanic or Latino of any race were 10.57% (92) of the population.

Of the 377 households, 26.5% had children under the age of 18; 32.6% were married couples living together; 18.3% had a female householder with no husband present and 42.7% were non-families. Of all households, 31.8% were made up of individuals and 6.1% had someone living alone who was 65 years of age or older. The average household size was 2.31 and the average family size was 2.97.

20.2% of the population were under the age of 18, 13.9% from 18 to 24, 28.7% from 25 to 44, 27.8% from 45 to 64, and 9.3% who were 65 years of age or older. The median age was 34.2 years. For every 100 females, the population had 89.1 males. For every 100 females ages 18 and older there were 86.6 males.

The Census Bureau's 2006–2010 American Community Survey showed that (in 2010 inflation-adjusted dollars) median household income was $45,469 (with a margin of error of +/− $4,794) and the median family income was $53,750 (+/− $15,403). Males had a median income of $37,222 (+/− $14,117) versus $38,804 (+/− $7,870) for females. The per capita income for the borough was $23,678 (+/− $3,470). About 13.5% of families and 13.7% of the population were below the poverty line, including 26.0% of those under age 18 and 5.9% of those age 65 or over.

=== 2000 census ===
As of the 2000 United States census there were 1,029 people, 472 households, and 260 families residing in the borough. The population density was 4,536.9 inhabitants per square mile (1,751.7/km^{2}). There were 495 housing units at an average density of 2,182.5 per square mile (842.7/km^{2}). The racial makeup of the borough was 71.04% White, 19.24% African American, 3.11% Asian, 4.37% from other races, and 2.24% from two or more races. Hispanic or Latino of any race were 6.90% of the population.

There were 472 households, out of which 28.0% had children under the age of 18 living with them, 31.6% were married couples living together, 16.3% had a female householder with no husband present, and 44.9% were non-families. 36.4% of all households were made up of individuals, and 9.3% had someone living alone who was 65 years of age or older. The average household size was 2.18 and the average family size was 2.83.

In the borough the population was spread out, with 25.0% under the age of 18, 10.5% from 18 to 24, 36.3% from 25 to 44, 14.5% from 45 to 64, and 13.7% who were 65 years of age or older. The median age was 32 years. For every 100 females, there were 89.2 males. For every 100 females age 18 and over, there were 87.8 males.

The median income for a household in the borough was $34,948, and the median income for a family was $38,393. Males had a median income of $32,308 versus $25,759 for females. The per capita income for the borough was $19,285. About 9.9% of families and 12.2% of the population were below the poverty line, including 10.7% of those under age 18 and 6.3% of those age 65 or over.

== Government ==
=== Local government ===
Hi-Nella is governed under the borough form of New Jersey municipal government, one of 218 municipalities (of the 564) statewide that use this form, which is the state's most common form of government. The governing body is comprised of the mayor and the six-member borough council, with all positions elected at-large on a partisan basis as part of the November general election. A mayor is elected directly by the voters to a four-year term of office. The borough council includes six members elected to serve three-year terms on a staggered basis, with three seats coming up for election in odd-numbered years in a three-year cycle. The borough form of government used by Hi-Nella is a "weak mayor / strong council" government in which council members act as the legislative body with the mayor presiding at meetings and voting only in the event of a tie. The mayor can veto ordinances subject to an override by a two-thirds majority vote of the council. The mayor makes committee and liaison assignments for council members, and most appointments are made by the mayor with the advice and consent of the council.

As of 2023, the mayor of Hi-Nella is Democrat Michael J. Segeren, whose term of office ends December 31, 2023. Members of the Borough Council are Jose A. Class (R, 2024), Cindy McCoy (D, 2023), Kris Muska (I, 2024), Harry Uber (R, 2023) and Robert Wise (D, 2025).

=== Federal, state and county representation ===
Hi-Nella is located in the 1st Congressional District and is part of New Jersey's 6th state legislative district.

For the 119th United States Congress, New Jersey's 1st congressional district is represented by Donald Norcross (D, Camden). New Jersey is represented in the United States Senate by Democrats Cory Booker (Newark, term ends 2027) and Andy Kim (Moorestown, term ends 2031).

For the 2026–2027 session, the 6th legislative district of the New Jersey Legislature is represented in the State Senate by James Beach (D, Voorhees Township) and in the General Assembly by Louis Greenwald (D, Voorhees Township) and Melinda Kane (D, Cherry Hill).

Camden County is governed by a Board of County Commissioners composed of seven members chosen at-large in partisan elections for three-year terms on a staggered basis by the residents of the county, with either two or three seats up for election each year as part of the November general election. At a reorganization meeting held in January after each election, the newly constituted Board of Commissioners selects one member to serve as Director and another as Deputy Director, each serving a one-year term in that role. As of 2025, Camden County's Commissioners are: Commissioner Director Louis Cappelli Jr. (D, Collingswood, 2026), Commissioner Deputy Director Edward T. McDonnell (D, Pennsauken Township, 2025), Virginia Ruiz Betteridge (D, Runnemede, 2025), Almar Dyer (D, Pennsauken Township, 2027), Melinda Kane (D, Cherry Hill, 2027), Jeffrey L. Nash (D, Winslow Township, 2027), and Jonathan L. Young Sr. (D, Berlin Township, 2026).

Camden County's constitutional officers are: Clerk Pamela Rosen Lampitt (D, Cherry Hill, 2029) Sheriff Chuck Billingham (D, Gloucester City, 2027) and Surrogate Michelle Gentek-Mayer (D, Gloucester Township, 2025).

=== Politics ===
As of March 2011, there were a total of 571 registered voters in Hi-Nella, of which 252 (44.1%) were registered as Democrats, 59 (10.3%) were registered as Republicans and 260 (45.5%) were registered as Unaffiliated. There were no voters registered to other parties.

Gubernatorial election results for Hi-Nella
Year	Republican		Democratic		Third party(ies)	
Year	No.	%	No.	%	No.	%
2025	96	32.76%	195	66.55%	2	0.68%
2021	93	41.15%	128	56.64%	5	2.21%
2017	59	36.65%	95	59.01%	7	4.35%
2013	99	59.64%	61	36.75%	6	3.61%
2009	90	46.63%	89	46.11%	14	7.25%
2005	70	37.84%	105	56.76%	10	5.41%

In the 2012 presidential election, Democrat Barack Obama received 66.1% of the vote (213 cast), ahead of Republican Mitt Romney with 30.4% (98 votes), and other candidates with 3.4% (11 votes), among the 326 ballots cast by the borough's 645 registered voters (4 ballots were spoiled), for a turnout of 50.5%. In the 2008 presidential election, Democrat Barack Obama received 67.5% of the vote (249 cast), ahead of Republican John McCain, who received around 29.3% (108 votes), with 369 ballots cast among the borough's 529 registered voters, for a turnout of 69.8%. In the 2004 presidential election, Democrat John Kerry received 61.9% of the vote (216 ballots cast), outpolling Republican George W. Bush, who received around 37.5% (131 votes), with 349 ballots cast among the borough's 497 registered voters, for a turnout percentage of 70.2.

United States presidential election results for Hi-Nella
Year	Republican		Democratic		Third party(ies)	
Year	No.	%	No.	%	No.	%
2024	149	37.72%	239	60.51%	7	1.77%
2020	141	30.65%	315	68.48%	4	0.87%
2016	133	35.00%	224	58.95%	23	6.05%
2012	98	30.43%	213	66.15%	11	3.42%
2008	108	29.27%	249	67.48%	12	3.25%
2004	131	37.54%	216	61.89%	2	0.57%

In the 2013 gubernatorial election, Republican Chris Christie received 59.6% of the vote (99 cast), ahead of Democrat Barbara Buono with 36.7% (61 votes), and other candidates with 3.6% (6 votes), among the 171 ballots cast by the borough's 658 registered voters (5 ballots were spoiled), for a turnout of 26.0%. In the 2009 gubernatorial election, Republican Chris Christie received 46.6% of the vote (90 ballots cast), ahead of both Democrat Jon Corzine with 46.1% (89 votes) and Independent Chris Daggett with 4.1% (8 votes), with 193 ballots cast among the borough's 544 registered voters, yielding a 35.5% turnout.

United States Senate election results for Hi-Nella1
Year	Republican		Democratic		Third party(ies)	
Year	No.	%	No.	%	No.	%
2024	142	36.60%	235	60.57%	11	2.84%
2018	99	35.87%	151	54.71%	26	9.42%
2012	98	32.89%	192	64.43%	8	2.68%
2006	66	35.11%	113	60.11%	9	4.79%

United States Senate election results for Hi-Nella2
Year	Republican		Democratic		Third party(ies)	
Year	No.	%	No.	%	No.	%
2020	138	30.40%	312	68.72%	4	0.88%
2014	61	39.10%	86	55.13%	9	5.77%
2013	37	38.14%	58	59.79%	2	2.06%
2008	106	32.82%	214	66.25%	3	0.93%

== Education ==
Hi-Nella is a non-operating school district. For pre-kindergarten through eighth grade, public school students from Hi-Nella attend school in Stratford as part of a sending/receiving relationship with the Stratford School District that was phased in over a five-year period starting in the 2012–13 school year. As of the 2022–23 school year, the district, comprised of two schools, had an enrollment of 901 students and 78.0 classroom teachers (on an FTE basis), for a student–teacher ratio of 11.6:1. Schools in the district (with 2022–23 enrollment data from the National Center for Education Statistics) are Parkview Elementary School with 384 students in pre-kindergarten through third grade and Samuel S. Yellin Elementary School with 507 students in grades 4 through 8.

Prior to the 2012–13 changeover, Hi-Nella students in K–8 had attended the Oaklyn Public School District. With Hi-Nella ending its sending/receiving relationship under a phase-out that would see all Hi-Nella students out of Oaklyn's school by 2016–17, the Oaklyn district saw overall enrollment decline from 469 in 2011–12 to 384 in 2014–15, resulting in the loss of tuition revenue that had accounted for as much as 10% of Oaklyn's budget, causing significant strain on the district's budget.

For ninth grade through twelfth grade, public school students attend Sterling High School, a regional high school district that serves students from Magnolia, Somerdale and Stratford, along with the sending districts of Hi-Nella and Laurel Springs. The high school is located in Somerdale. As of the 2022–23 school year, the high school had an enrollment of 894 students and 70.0 classroom teachers (on an FTE basis), for a student–teacher ratio of 12.8:1. Prior to the establishment of the sending agreement with Sterling in 1996, Hi-Nella students had attended Collingswood High School, which is much further away from Hi-Nella.

== Transportation ==
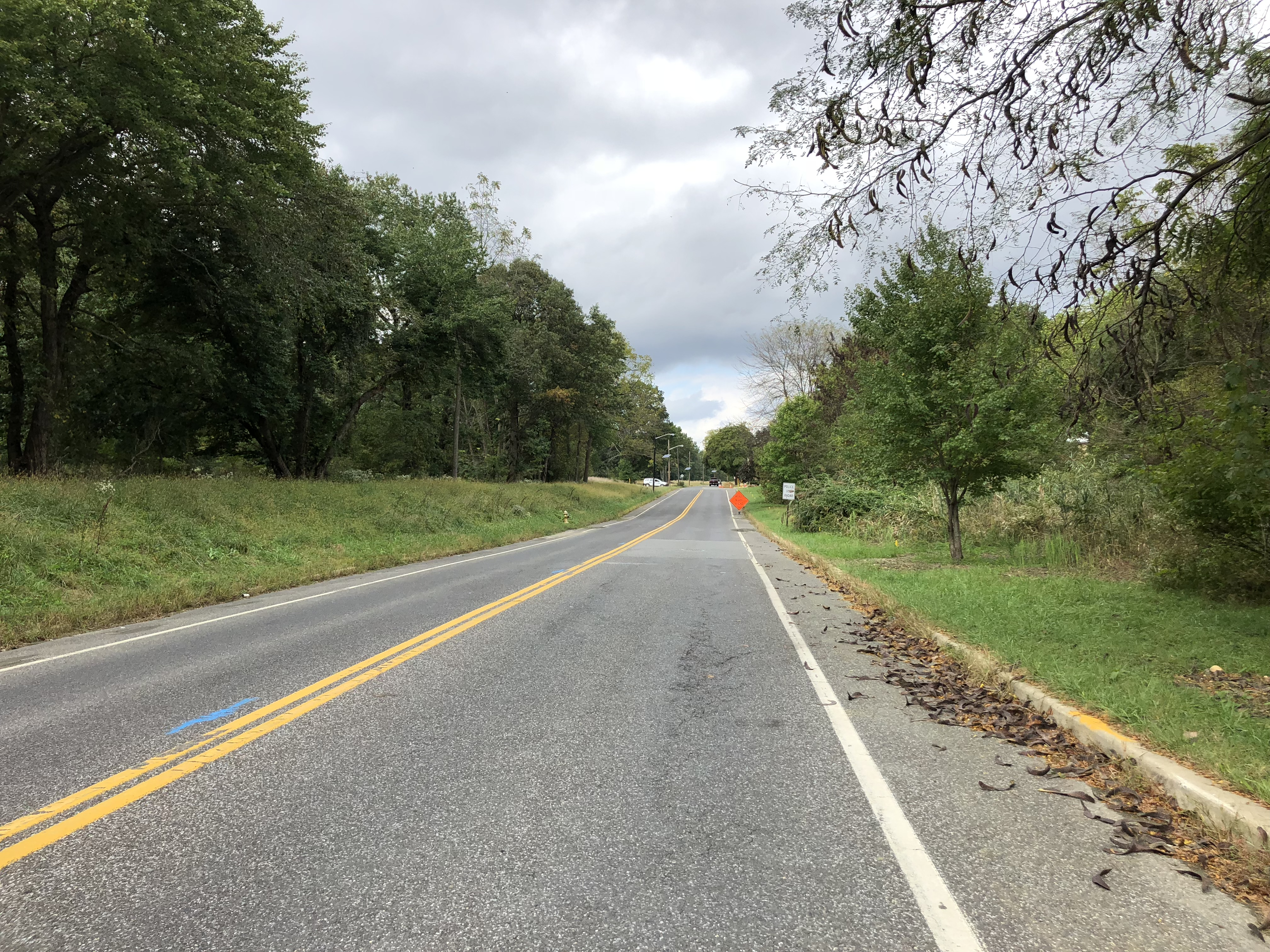
County Route 727 northbound entering Hi-Nella

As of May 2010, the borough had a total of 3.18 miles (5.12 km) of roadways, of which 2.32 miles (3.73 km) were maintained by the municipality and 0.86 miles (1.38 km) by Camden County.

No Interstate, U.S., state or major county highways traverse Hi-Nella. The only numbered routes are minor county roads, such as County Route 727.
