= Pine Valley, New Jersey =

Former borough in Camden County, New Jersey, US

- Borough
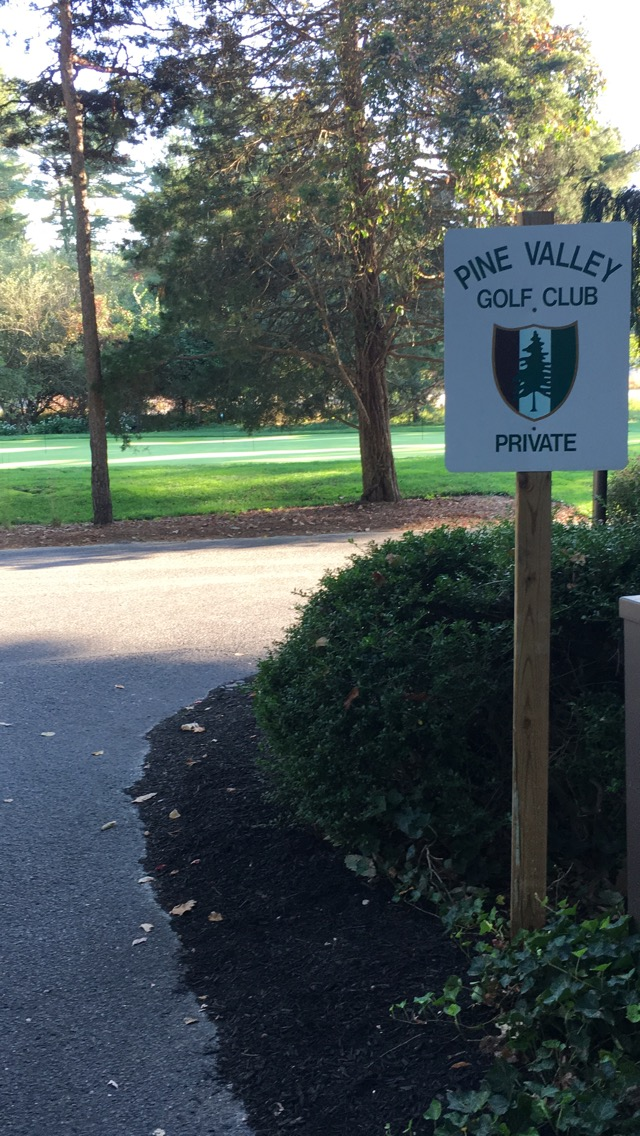
- Sign for the Pine Valley Golf Club located in the former borough

- Pine Valley highlighted in Camden County. Inset: Location of Camden County highlighted in the State of New Jersey.

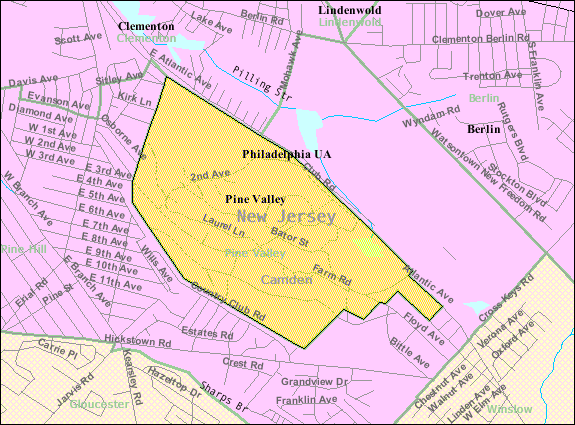
- Census Bureau map of Pine Valley, New Jersey

- Location in Camden County Location in New Jersey Location in the United States
- Coordinates: 39.788284°N 74.974882°W
- Country: United States
- State: New Jersey
- County: Camden
- Incorporated: April 23, 1929
- Disestablished: January 1, 2022

Government
  - Type: Walsh Act
  - Body: Board of Commissioners
  - Mayor: Michael B. Kennedy (term ended December 31, 2021)
  - Administrator: Robert W. Mather
  - Municipal clerk: Dawn T. Amadio

Area
  - Total: 0.97 sq mi (2.51 km^{2})
  - Land: 0.95 sq mi (2.47 km^{2})
  - Water: 0.015 sq mi (0.04 km^{2}) 1.55%
  - Rank: 505th of 565 in state 28th of 37 in county
- Elevation: 157 ft (48 m)

Population (2020)
  - Total: 21
  - Estimate (2021): 13
  - Rank: 563rd of 565 in state 36th of 37 in county
  - Density: 22/sq mi (8.5/km^{2})
  - Rank: 561st of 565 in state 37th of 37 in county
- Time zone: UTC−05:00 (Eastern (EST))
  - Summer (DST): UTC−04:00 (Eastern (EDT))
- ZIP Code: 08021
- Area code: 856
- FIPS code: 3400758920
- GNIS feature ID: 0885353

Pine Valley was a borough in Camden County, in the U.S. state of New Jersey. As of the 2020 United States census, the borough's population was 21, an increase of 9 (+75.0%) from the 2010 census count of 12, which in turn reflected a decline of 8 (-40.0%) from the 20 counted in the 2000 census. Before its merger with the adjacent Borough of Pine Hill, Pine Valley was the third-smallest municipality by population in New Jersey, with 12 more residents than the nine residing in Tavistock (also in Camden County) and 14 more than the seven in Walpack Township (in Sussex County).

Pine Valley encompassed Pine Valley Golf Club, which regularly ranks highly on Golf Digest's list of America's 100 greatest courses.

The Borough of Pine Valley was created on April 23, 1929, from Clementon Township, one of seven municipalities created from the now-defunct township, and one of five new municipalities (including Hi-Nella Borough, Lindenwold Borough, Pine Hill Borough and Somerdale Borough) created on that same date.

In 2021, the Borough finalized plans to merge with the adjacent Borough of Pine Hill, dissolving the Pine Valley borough government completely when the merger took effect on January 1, 2022. Pine Hill gained $20 million in taxable property and the famed golf club. The merger of the two municipalities was the first in the state since Princeton was formed in 2013 from the former Princeton Borough and Princeton Township, New Jersey.

== Geography ==
According to the United States Census Bureau, the borough had a total area of 0.97 square miles (2.51 km^{2}), including 0.96 square miles (2.47 km^{2}) of land and 0.02 square miles (0.04 km^{2}) of water (1.55%).

The borough bordered the Camden County municipalities of Clementon Borough and Pine Hill.

== Demographics ==
Historical population
Census	Pop.	Note	%±
1930	40		—
1940	27		−32.5%
1950	39		44.4%
1960	20		−48.7%
1970	23		15.0%
1980	23		0.0%
1990	19		−17.4%
2000	20		5.3%
2010	12		−40.0%
2020	21		75.0%
2021 (est.)	20	▼	−4.8%
Population sources: 1930-2000 1930 1940–2000; 2000 2010 2020

=== 2010 census ===
The 2010 United States census counted 12 people, 4 households, and 4 families in the borough. The population density was 12.2 per square mile (4.7/km^{2}). There were 22 housing units at an average density of 22.4 per square mile (8.6/km^{2}). The racial makeup was 83.33% (10) White, 0.00% (0) Black or African American, 0.00% (0) Native American, 0.00% (0) Asian, 0.00% (0) Pacific Islander, 16.67% (2) from other races, and 0.00% (0) from two or more races. Hispanic or Latino of any race were 16.67% (2) of the population.

Of the 4 households, 50.0% had children under the age of 18; 75.0% were married couples living together; 0.0% had a female householder with no husband present and 0.0% were non-families. Of all households, 0.0% were made up of individuals and 0.0% had someone living alone who was 65 years of age or older. The average household size was 3.00 and the average family size was 3.00.

16.7% of the population were under the age of 18, 16.7% from 18 to 24, 33.3% from 25 to 44, 33.3% from 45 to 64, and 0.0% who were 65 years of age or older. The median age was 42.5 years. For every 100 females, the population had 300.0 males. For every 100 females ages 18 and older there were 233.3 males.

As of the 2010 Census, the borough had the second smallest population in the state, ahead of only Tavistock, which had a population of five.

=== 2000 census ===
As of the 2000 United States census there were 20 people, 8 households, and 7 families residing in the borough. The population density was 21.0 inhabitants per square mile (8.1/km^{2}). There were 21 housing units at an average density of 22.1 per square mile (8.5/km^{2}). The racial makeup of the borough was 100.00% White.

As of the 2000 Census, the borough was one of four municipalities with fewer than 50 residents among the 566 in the state, and its population of 20 was behind only Teterboro, where census officials counted 18 residents.

There were eight households, out of which 25.0% had children under the age of eighteen living with them, 87.5% were married couples living together, and 12.5% were non-families. 12.5% of all households were made up of individuals, and 12.5% had someone living alone who was 65 years of age or older. The average household size was 2.50 and the average family size was 2.71.

In the borough the population was spread out, with 25.0% under the age of 18, 20.0% from 25 to 44, 15.0% from 45 to 64, and 40.0% who were 65 years of age or older. The median age was 58 years. For every 100 females, there were 150.0 males. For every 100 women age 18 and over, there were 114.3 men.

The median income for a household in the borough was $31,875, and the median income for a family was $65,625. Men had a median income of $36,250 versus $52,500 for women. The per capita income for the borough was $23,981. None of the population and none of the families were below the poverty line.

== Government ==
=== Local government ===
Pine Valley operated under the Walsh Act form of New Jersey municipal government. The borough was one of 30 municipalities (of the then-565) statewide that used the commission form of government. The governing body consisted of three commissioners, who are elected at-large on a non-partisan basis to four-year terms of office in elections held as part of the May municipal elections. Each commissioner was assigned a specific department to head in addition to their legislative functions and one of the three commissioners was chosen to serve as mayor. Pine Valley has been governed under the Walsh Act, by a three-member commission, since 1942.

At the time of the borough's dissolution in 2022, the members of the Pine Valley Board of Commissioners were Mayor Michael B. Kennedy, Kendra L. Clark and Debra M. Kennedy all serving terms of office ending May 17, 2022. The three commissioners had run unopposed in the 2018 May municipal election.

The three incumbents—Jane Bromley and husband-and-wife Michael B. Kennedy and Deborah Kennedy—were re-elected in May 2014 to four-year terms of office in an election held entirely by mail to minimize the costs associated with establishing a polling place for the borough's 14 voters.

=== Federal, state and county representation ===
Pine Valley was located in the 1st Congressional District and was part of New Jersey's 8th state legislative district. Prior to the 2011 reapportionment following the 2010 census, Pine Valley had been in the 6th state legislative district.

For the 119th United States Congress, New Jersey's 1st congressional district is represented by Donald Norcross (D, Camden). New Jersey is represented in the United States Senate by Democrats Cory Booker (Newark, term ends 2027) and Andy Kim (Moorestown, term ends 2031).

For the 2026–2027 session, the 8th legislative district of the New Jersey Legislature is represented in the New Jersey Senate by Latham Tiver (R, Southampton Township) and in the General Assembly by Anthony Angelozzi (D, Hammonton) and Andrea Katz (D, Chesterfield Township).

Camden County is governed by a Board of County Commissioners composed of seven members chosen at-large in partisan elections for three-year terms on a staggered basis by the residents of the county, with either two or three seats up for election each year as part of the November general election. At a reorganization meeting held in January after each election, the newly constituted Board of Commissioners selects one member to serve as Director and another as Deputy Director, each serving a one-year term in that role. As of 2025, Camden County's Commissioners are: Commissioner Director Louis Cappelli Jr. (D, Collingswood, 2026), Commissioner Deputy Director Edward T. McDonnell (D, Pennsauken Township, 2025), Virginia Ruiz Betteridge (D, Runnemede, 2025), Almar Dyer (D, Pennsauken Township, 2027), Melinda Kane (D, Cherry Hill, 2027), Jeffrey L. Nash (D, Winslow Township, 2027), and Jonathan L. Young Sr. (D, Berlin Township, 2026).

Camden County's constitutional officers are: Clerk Pamela Rosen Lampitt (D, Cherry Hill, 2029) Sheriff Chuck Billingham (D, Gloucester City, 2027) and Surrogate Michelle Gentek-Mayer (D, Gloucester Township, 2025).

=== Politics ===
As of March 2011, there were a total of fifteen registered voters in Pine Valley, of which three (20.0%) were registered as Democrats, ten (66.7%) as Republicans and two (13.3%) as Unaffiliated. There were no voters registered to other parties.

In the 2013 gubernatorial election, Republican Chris Christie received 100.0% of the vote (nine cast), ahead of Democrat Barbara Buono and other candidates who received no votes, among the nine ballots cast by the borough's thirteen registered voters, for a turnout of 69.2%. In the 2009 gubernatorial election, Republican Chris Christie received 72.7% of the vote (8 ballots cast), ahead of both Independent Chris Daggett with 18.2% (two votes) and Democrat Jon Corzine with no votes, with eleven ballots cast among the borough's fourteen registered voters, yielding a 78.6% turnout.

== Education ==
Pine Hill is in the Pine Hill Schools, which operates Overbrook High School.

As an independent municipality, Pine Valley had a non-operating school district, Pine Valley Borough School District. At that time, public school students from Pine Valley attended the Haddonfield Public Schools for pre-kindergarten through twelfth grade as part of a sending/receiving relationship, together with students from Haddonfield and Tavistock. As of the 2018–19 school year, the district, comprised of five schools, had an enrollment of 2,749 students and 215.2 classroom teachers (on an FTE basis), for a student–teacher ratio of 12.8:1. Schools in the district (with 2018–19 enrollment data from the National Center for Education Statistics) are Central Elementary School with 419 students in grades K-5, Elizabeth Haddon Elementary School with 367 students in grades K-5, J. Fithian Tatem Elementary School with 422 students in grades PreK-5, Haddonfield Middle School with 659 students in grades 6-8 and Haddonfield Memorial High School with 869 students in grades 9–12.

== Transportation ==
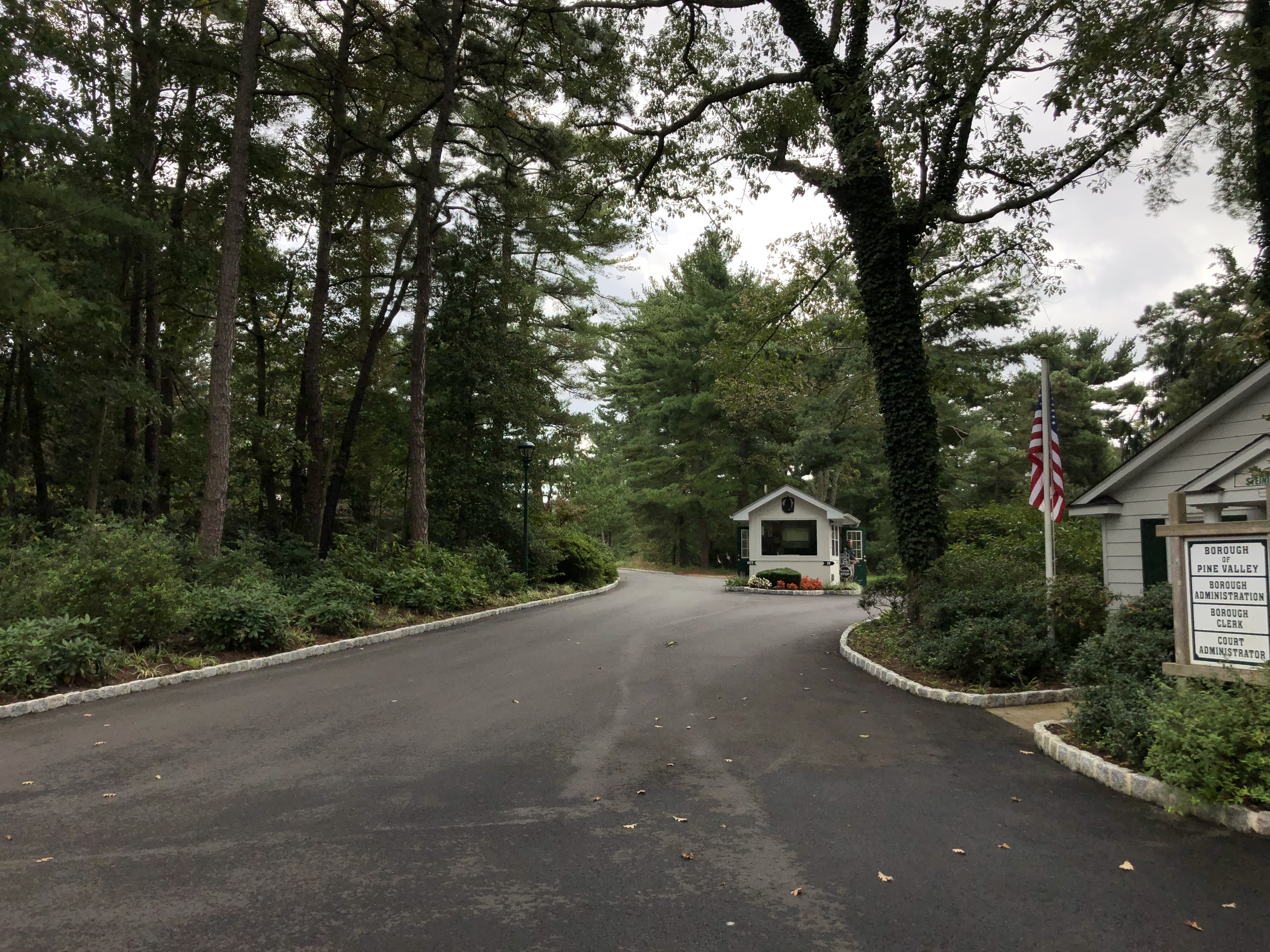
Entrance to Pine Valley

All roads in Pine Valley are privately maintained by the golf course. There is only one public entrance, via Atlantic Avenue from neighboring Pine Hill.
