= Somerdale, New Jersey =

Borough in Camden County, New Jersey, US

- Borough
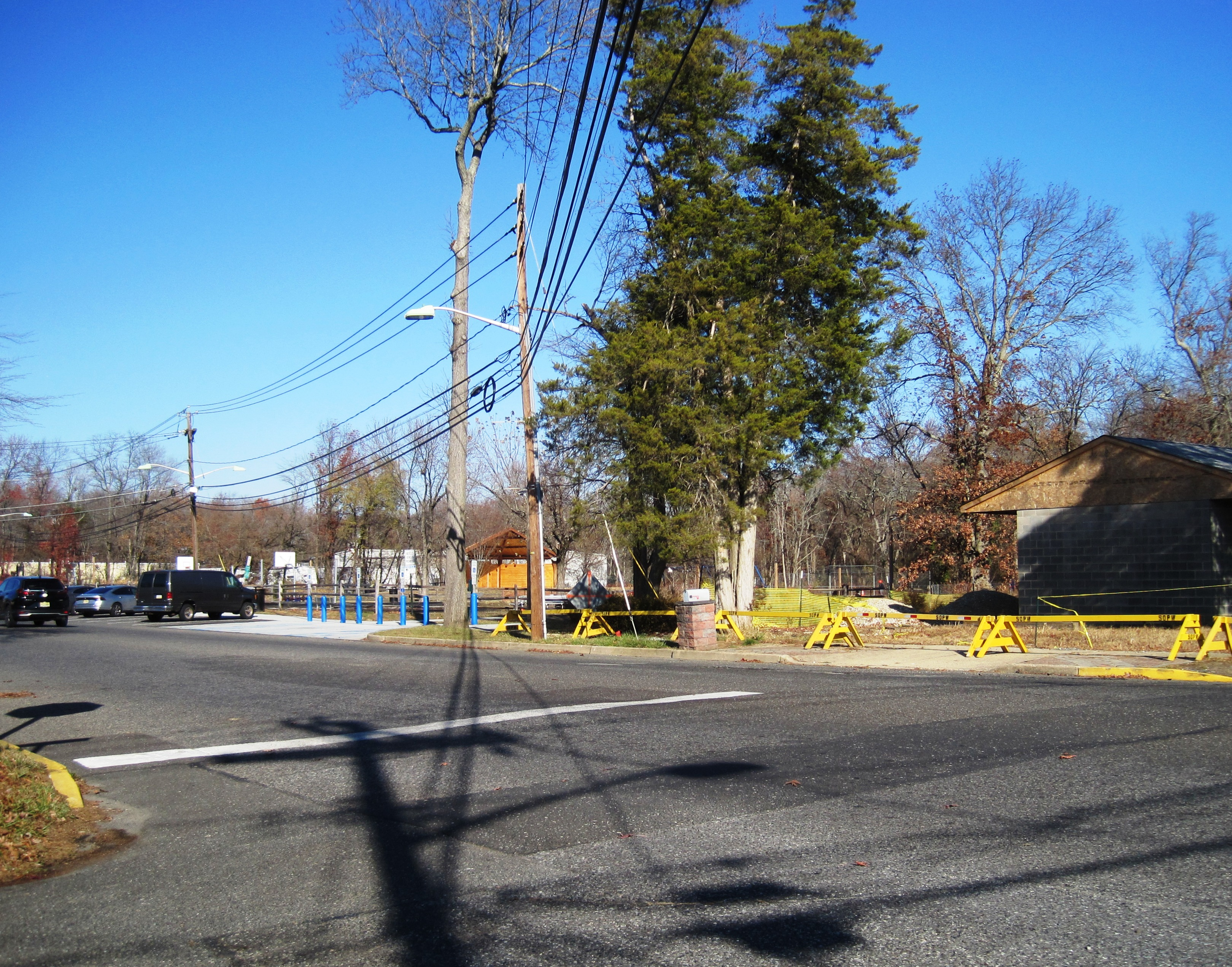
- Somerdale Park

- logo

- Somerdale highlighted in Camden County. Inset: Location of Camden County in New Jersey.

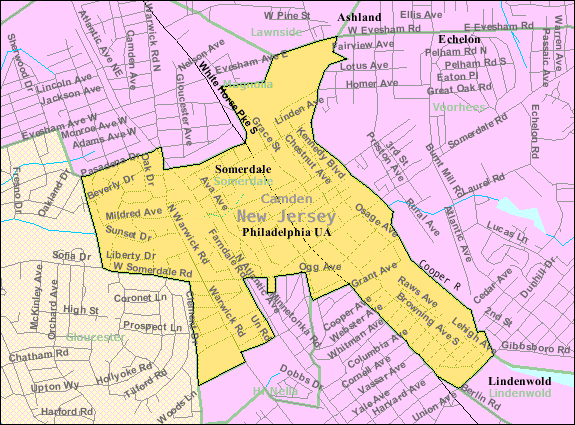
- Census Bureau map of Somerdale, New Jersey

- Location in Camden County Location in New Jersey Location in the United States
- Coordinates: 39.845416°N 75.021701°W
- Country: United States
- State: New Jersey
- County: Camden
- Incorporated: April 23, 1929

Government
  - Type: Borough
  - Body: Borough Council
  - Mayor: Gary J. Passanante (D, term ends December 31, 2023)
  - Municipal clerk: Michele D. Miller

Area
  - Total: 1.39 sq mi (3.61 km^{2})
  - Land: 1.39 sq mi (3.61 km^{2})
  - Water: 0 sq mi (0.00 km^{2}) 0.00%
  - Rank: 461st of 565 in state 26th of 37 in county
- Elevation: 85 ft (26 m)

Population (2020)
  - Total: 5,566
  - Estimate (2023): 5,567
  - Rank: 362nd of 565 in state 22nd of 37 in county
  - Density: 3,998.6/sq mi (1,543.9/km^{2})
  - Rank: 158th of 565 in state 20th of 37 in county
- Time zone: UTC−05:00 (Eastern (EST))
  - Summer (DST): UTC−04:00 (Eastern (EDT))
- ZIP Code: 08083
- Area code: 856
- FIPS code: 3400768340
- GNIS feature ID: 0885396
- Website: www.somerdale-nj.com

Somerdale is a borough in Camden County, in the U.S. state of New Jersey. As of the 2020 United States census, the borough's population was 5,566, an increase of 415 (+8.1%) from the 2010 census count of 5,151, which in turn reflected a decline of 41 (−0.8%) from the 5,192 counted in the 2000 census.

Somerdale was created on April 23, 1929, from portions of Clementon Township, one of seven municipalities created from the now-defunct township, and one of five new municipalities created on the same date: Hi-Nella, Lindenwold, Pine Hill and Pine Valley.

== Geography ==
According to the U.S. Census Bureau, Somerdale had a total area of 1.39 square miles (3.61 km^{2}), all of which was land.

Somerdale borders the Camden County municipalities of Cherry Hill, Gloucester Township, Hi-Nella, Lawnside, Lindenwold, Magnolia, Stratford, and Voorhees Township.

== Demographics ==
Historical population
Census	Pop.	Note	%±
1930	1,151		—
1940	1,170		1.7%
1950	1,417		21.1%
1960	4,839		241.5%
1970	6,510		34.5%
1980	5,900		−9.4%
1990	5,440		−7.8%
2000	5,123		−5.8%
2010	5,151		0.5%
2020	5,566		8.1%
2023 (est.)	5,567	▲	0.0%
Population sources: 1930–2000 1930; 1940–2000 2000; 2010 2020

=== 2020 census ===
As of the 2020 census, Somerdale had a population of 5,566. The median age was 39.9 years. 18.7% of residents were under the age of 18 and 16.6% of residents were 65 years of age or older. For every 100 females there were 96.3 males, and for every 100 females age 18 and over there were 95.3 males age 18 and over.

100.0% of residents lived in urban areas, while 0.0% lived in rural areas.

There were 2,290 households in Somerdale, of which 27.3% had children under the age of 18 living in them. Of all households, 39.4% were married-couple households, 22.1% were households with a male householder and no spouse or partner present, and 29.3% were households with a female householder and no spouse or partner present. About 29.6% of all households were made up of individuals and 10.2% had someone living alone who was 65 years of age or older.

There were 2,437 housing units, of which 6.0% were vacant. The homeowner vacancy rate was 2.2% and the rental vacancy rate was 6.1%.

Racial composition as of the 2020 census
Race	Number	Percent
White	3,218	57.8%
Black or African American	1,201	21.6%
American Indian and Alaska Native	21	0.4%
Asian	349	6.3%
Native Hawaiian and Other Pacific Islander	3	0.1%
Some other race	269	4.8%
Two or more races	505	9.1%
Hispanic or Latino (of any race)	687	12.3%

=== 2010 census ===
The 2010 United States census counted 5,151 people, 2,026 households, and 1,345 families in the borough. The population density was 3,714.0 per square mile (1,434.0/km^{2}). There were 2,158 housing units at an average density of 1,556.0 per square mile (600.8/km^{2}). The racial makeup was 68.20% (3,513) White, 18.99% (978) Black or African American, 0.08% (4) Native American, 6.00% (309) Asian, 0.02% (1) Pacific Islander, 3.07% (158) from other races, and 3.65% (188) from two or more races. Hispanic or Latino of any race were 8.19% (422) of the population.

Of the 2,026 households, 25.3% had children under the age of 18; 47.0% were married couples living together; 14.1% had a female householder with no husband present and 33.6% were non-families. Of all households, 27.3% were made up of individuals and 9.9% had someone living alone who was 65 years of age or older. The average household size was 2.54 and the average family size was 3.11.

20.6% of the population were under the age of 18, 8.0% from 18 to 24, 27.1% from 25 to 44, 29.0% from 45 to 64, and 15.3% who were 65 years of age or older. The median age was 41.1 years. For every 100 females, the population had 97.5 males. For every 100 females ages 18 and older there were 96.4 males.

The Census Bureau's 2006–2010 American Community Survey showed that (in 2010 inflation-adjusted dollars) median household income was $60,991 (with a margin of error of +/− $10,116) and the median family income was $71,862 (+/− $7,180). Males had a median income of $46,132 (+/− $3,220) versus $32,287 (+/− $3,698) for females. The per capita income for the borough was $26,221 (+/− $2,206). About 2.2% of families and 5.2% of the population were below the poverty line, including 1.8% of those under age 18 and none of those age 65 or over.

=== 2000 census ===
As of the 2000 U.S. census, there were 5,192 people, 2,068 households, and 1,379 families residing in the borough. The population density was 3,778.9 inhabitants per square mile (1,459.0/km^{2}). There were 2,168 housing units at an average density of 1,577.9 per square mile (609.2/km^{2}). The racial makeup of the borough was 75.35% White, 17.66% African American, 0.21% Native American, 3.24% Asian, 0.02% Pacific Islander, 1.08% from other races, and 2.45% from two or more races. Hispanic or Latino of any race were 3.89% of the population.

There were 2,068 households, out of which 27.5% had children under the age of 18 living with them, 48.4% were married couples living together, 12.1% had a female householder with no husband present, and 33.3% were non-families. 29.6% of all households were made up of individuals, and 9.5% had someone living alone who was 65 years of age or older. The average household size was 2.51 and the average family size was 3.11.

The population in Somerdale was spread out, with 22.3% under the age of 18, 7.0% from 18 to 24, 31.3% from 25 to 44, 24.0% from 45 to 64, and 15.4% who were 65 years of age or older. The median age was 39 years. For every 100 females, there were 95.9 males. For every 100 females age 18 and over, there were 94.4 males.

The median income for a household in the borough was $46,898, and the median income for a family was $54,200. Males had a median income of $37,008 versus $31,237 for females. The per capita income for the borough was $21,259. About 6.4% of families and 5.5% of the population were below the poverty line, including 8.4% of those under age 18 and 6.2% of those age 65 or over.

== Government ==
=== Local government ===
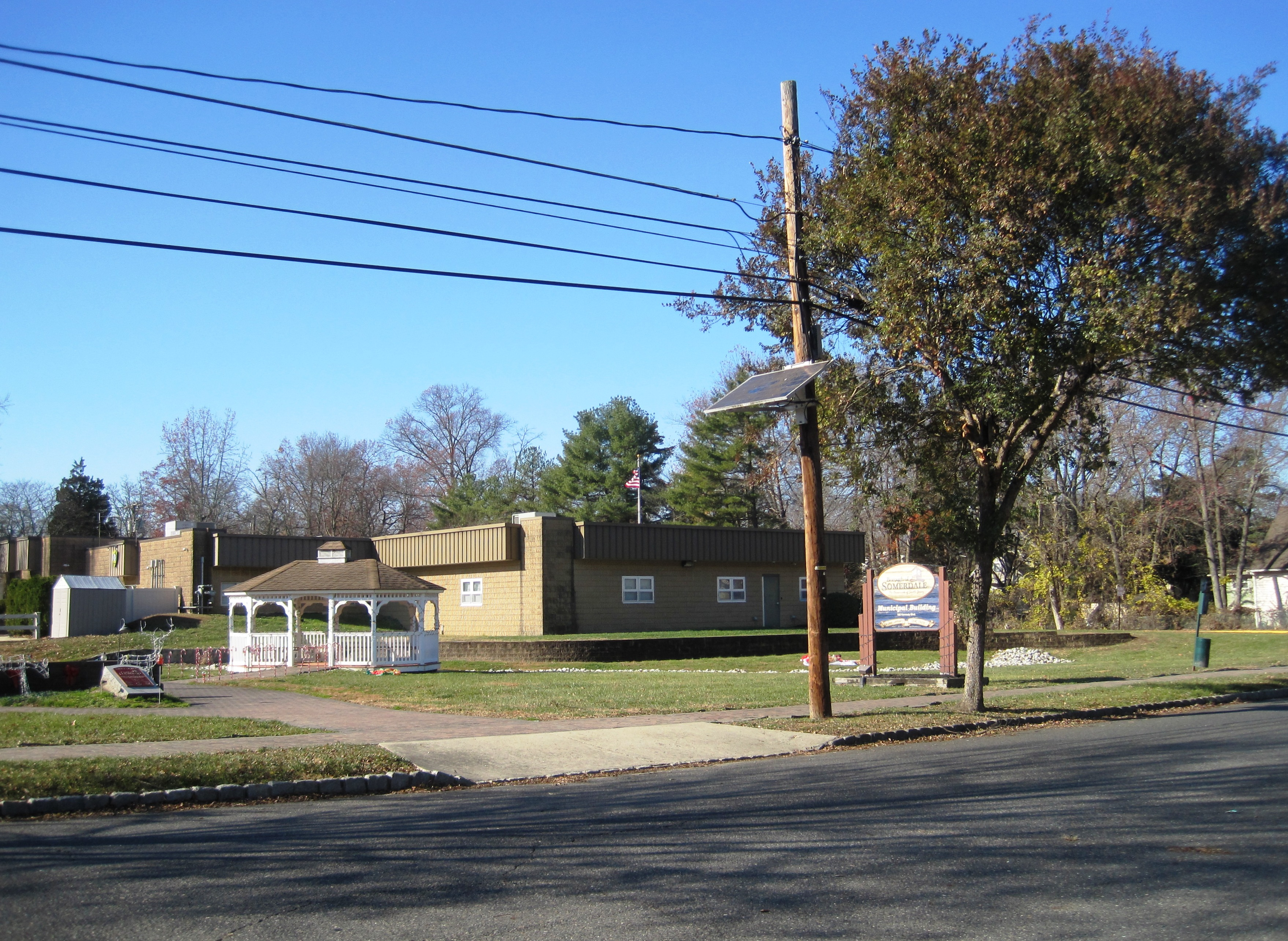
Somerdale Municipal Building

Somerdale is governed under the borough form of New Jersey municipal government, which is used in 218 (of the 564) municipalities in the state, making it the most common form of government in New Jersey. The governing body is comprised of the mayor and the borough council, with all positions elected at-large on a partisan basis as part of the November general election. A mayor is elected directly by the voters to a four-year term of office. The borough council includes six members, who are elected to serve three-year terms on a staggered basis, with two seats coming up for election each year in a three-year cycle. The borough form of government used by Somerdale is a "weak mayor / strong council" government in which council members act as the legislative body with the mayor presiding at meetings and voting only in the event of a tie. The mayor can veto ordinances subject to an override by a two-thirds majority vote of the council. The mayor makes committee and liaison assignments for council members, and most appointments are made by the mayor with the advice and consent of the council.

As of 2023, the mayor of Somerdale is Democrat Gary J. Passanante, whose term of office ends December 31, 2023. Members of the Borough Council are Council President George Badey (D, 2024), David A. Alexander (D, 2025), George C. Ehrmann (D, 2024), Barbara Kane (D, 2025), James J. Perry (D, 2023) and Lawrence R. "Larry" Sefchick (D, 2023).

=== Federal, state, and county representation ===
Somerdale is located in the 1st Congressional District and is part of New Jersey's 6th state legislative district.

For the 119th United States Congress, New Jersey's 1st congressional district is represented by Donald Norcross (D, Camden). New Jersey is represented in the United States Senate by Democrats Cory Booker (Newark, term ends 2027) and Andy Kim (Moorestown, term ends 2031).

For the 2026–2027 session, the 6th legislative district of the New Jersey Legislature is represented in the State Senate by James Beach (D, Voorhees Township) and in the General Assembly by Louis Greenwald (D, Voorhees Township) and Melinda Kane (D, Cherry Hill).

Camden County is governed by a Board of County Commissioners composed of seven members chosen at-large in partisan elections for three-year terms on a staggered basis by the residents of the county, with either two or three seats up for election each year as part of the November general election. At a reorganization meeting held in January after each election, the newly constituted Board of Commissioners selects one member to serve as Director and another as Deputy Director, each serving a one-year term in that role. As of 2025, Camden County's Commissioners are: Commissioner Director Louis Cappelli Jr. (D, Collingswood, 2026), Commissioner Deputy Director Edward T. McDonnell (D, Pennsauken Township, 2025), Virginia Ruiz Betteridge (D, Runnemede, 2025), Almar Dyer (D, Pennsauken Township, 2027), Melinda Kane (D, Cherry Hill, 2027), Jeffrey L. Nash (D, Winslow Township, 2027), and Jonathan L. Young Sr. (D, Berlin Township, 2026).

Camden County's constitutional officers are: Clerk Pamela Rosen Lampitt (D, Cherry Hill, 2029) Sheriff Chuck Billingham (D, Gloucester City, 2027) and Surrogate Michelle Gentek-Mayer (D, Gloucester Township, 2025).

=== Politics ===
As of March 2011, there were a total of 3,457 registered voters in Somerdale, of which 1,919 (55.5%) were registered as Democrats, 318 (9.2%) were registered as Republicans and 1,215 (35.1%) were registered as Unaffiliated. There were 5 voters registered as Libertarians or Greens.

Gubernatorial election results for Somerdale
Year	Republican		Democratic		Third party(ies)	
Year	No.	%	No.	%	No.	%
2025	666	31.81%	1,412	67.43%	16	0.76%
2021	591	35.95%	1,038	63.14%	15	0.91%
2017	342	26.61%	921	71.67%	22	1.71%
2013	606	49.23%	604	49.07%	21	1.71%
2009	481	33.57%	842	58.76%	110	7.68%
2005	416	30.01%	907	65.44%	63	4.55%

In the 2012 presidential election, Democrat Barack Obama received 72.4% of the vote (1,718 cast), ahead of Republican Mitt Romney with 26.8% (635 votes), and other candidates with 0.8% (19 votes), among the 2,383 ballots cast by the borough's 3,747 registered voters (11 ballots were spoiled), for a turnout of 63.6%. In the 2008 presidential election, Democrat Barack Obama received 68.3% of the vote (1,758 cast), ahead of Republican John McCain, who received around 28.5% (734 votes), with 2,573 ballots cast among the borough's 3,437 registered voters, for a turnout of 74.9%. In the 2004 presidential election, Democrat John Kerry received 65.2% of the vote (1,653 ballots cast), outpolling Republican George W. Bush, who received around 33.0% (836 votes), with 2,535 ballots cast among the borough's 3,444 registered voters, for a turnout percentage of 73.6.

United States presidential election results for Somerdale
Year	Republican		Democratic		Third party(ies)	
Year	No.	%	No.	%	No.	%
2024	1,000	36.32%	1,715	62.30%	38	1.38%
2020	950	32.67%	1,918	65.96%	40	1.38%
2016	772	31.38%	1,613	65.57%	75	3.05%
2012	635	26.77%	1,718	72.43%	19	0.80%
2008	734	28.53%	1,758	68.32%	81	3.15%
2004	836	32.98%	1,653	65.21%	46	1.81%

In the 2013 gubernatorial election, Republican Chris Christie received 49.2% of the vote (606 cast), ahead of Democrat Barbara Buono with 49.1% (604 votes), and other candidates with 1.7% (21 votes), among the 1,259 ballots cast by the borough's 3,753 registered voters (28 ballots were spoiled), for a turnout of 33.5%. In the 2009 gubernatorial election, Democrat Jon Corzine received 58.8% of the vote (842 ballots cast), ahead of both Republican Chris Christie with 33.6% (481 votes) and Independent Chris Daggett with 4.8% (69 votes), with 1,433 ballots cast among the borough's 3,469 registered voters, yielding a 41.3% turnout.

United States Senate election results for Somerdale1
Year	Republican		Democratic		Third party(ies)	
Year	No.	%	No.	%	No.	%
2024	859	32.39%	1,738	65.54%	55	2.07%
2018	619	31.61%	1,193	60.93%	146	7.46%
2012	544	24.35%	1,654	74.04%	36	1.61%
2006	418	30.85%	900	66.42%	37	2.73%

United States Senate election results for Somerdale2
Year	Republican		Democratic		Third party(ies)	
Year	No.	%	No.	%	No.	%
2020	908	31.70%	1,925	67.21%	31	1.08%
2014	582	36.06%	1,000	61.96%	32	1.98%
2013	221	28.15%	554	70.57%	10	1.27%
2008	633	27.50%	1,621	70.42%	48	2.09%

== Education ==
Somerdale School District serves public school students in pre-kindergarten through eighth grade at Somerdale Park School. As of the 2022–23 school year, the district, comprised of one school, had an enrollment of 447 students and 43.5 classroom teachers (on an FTE basis), for a student–teacher ratio of 10.3:1.

For ninth grade through twelfth grade, public school students attend Sterling High School, a regional high school district that also serves students from Magnolia and Stratford, along with the sending districts of Hi-Nella and Laurel Springs. The high school is located in Somerdale. As of the 2022–23 school year, the high school had an enrollment of 894 students and 70.0 classroom teachers (on an FTE basis), for a student–teacher ratio of 12.8:1. Seats on the district's board of education are allocated based on the population of the constituent municipalities, with three seats assigned to Somerdale.

Our Lady of Grace was a K–8 elementary school that operated under the auspices of the Roman Catholic Diocese of Camden. As part of the reorganization by the Camden Diocese, Our Lady of Grace School and the associated church were both closed, after a November 2009 announcement from the Camden Diocese that the Somerdale church would be one of three churches that would be closed and combined to create Our Lady of Guadalupe Parish in Lindenwold.

== Transportation ==
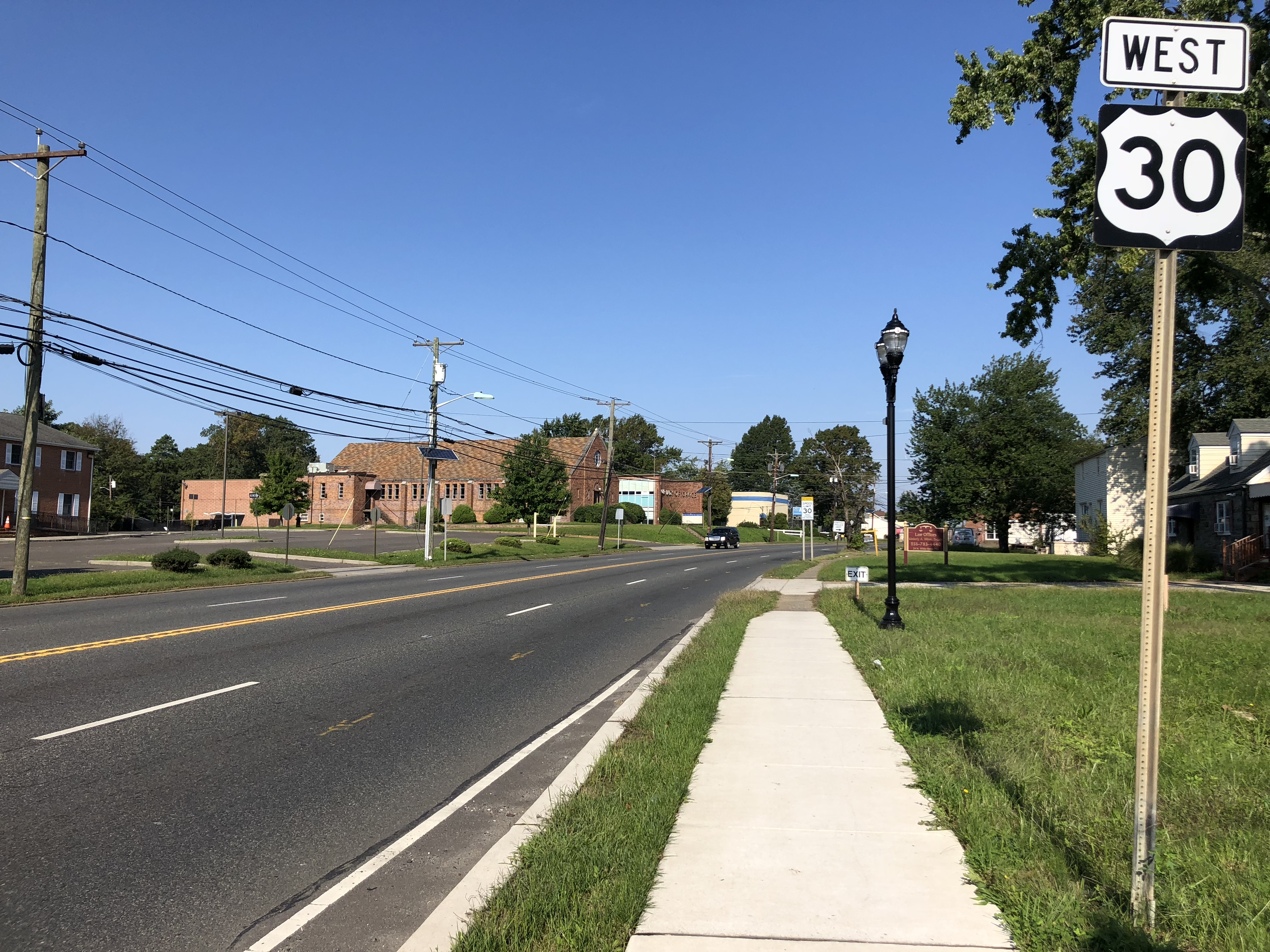
U.S. Route 30 westbound in Somerdale

=== Roads and highways ===
As of May 2010, the borough had a total of 24.21 miles (38.96 km) of roadways, of which 19.46 miles (31.32 km) were maintained by the municipality, 3.52 miles (5.66 km) by Camden County and 1.23 miles (1.98 km) by the New Jersey Department of Transportation.

U.S. Route 30 traverses the borough, from the border with Magnolia to the north and to Stratford to the south.

=== Public transportation ===
NJ Transit bus service between the borough and Philadelphia is available on the 403 route (from Turnersville to Camden), with local service available on the 451.

== Notable people ==
People who were born in, residents of, or otherwise closely associated with Somerdale include:

- Jason Cook (born 1980), television actor and director
- Darryl Dawkins (born 1957), former NBA basketball player
- Zac Gallen (born 1995), MLB baseball pitcher for the Arizona Diamondbacks
- April Holmes (born 1973), paralympic runner who holds the world records at 100, 200 and 400 meters
- Hugh A. Kelly Jr. (1923–1999), politician who served in the New Jersey Senate for a single term representing District 3B
- Michael Kidd-Gilchrist (born 1993), professional basketball player with the Charlotte Hornets
- Sophia A. Nelson (born 1967), author, political strategist, opinion writer and attorney
- Tim Saunders (born 1962), Philadelphia-based broadcaster, who is the radio announcer for the Philadelphia Flyers
