= Magnolia, New Jersey =

Borough in Camden County, New Jersey, US

- Borough
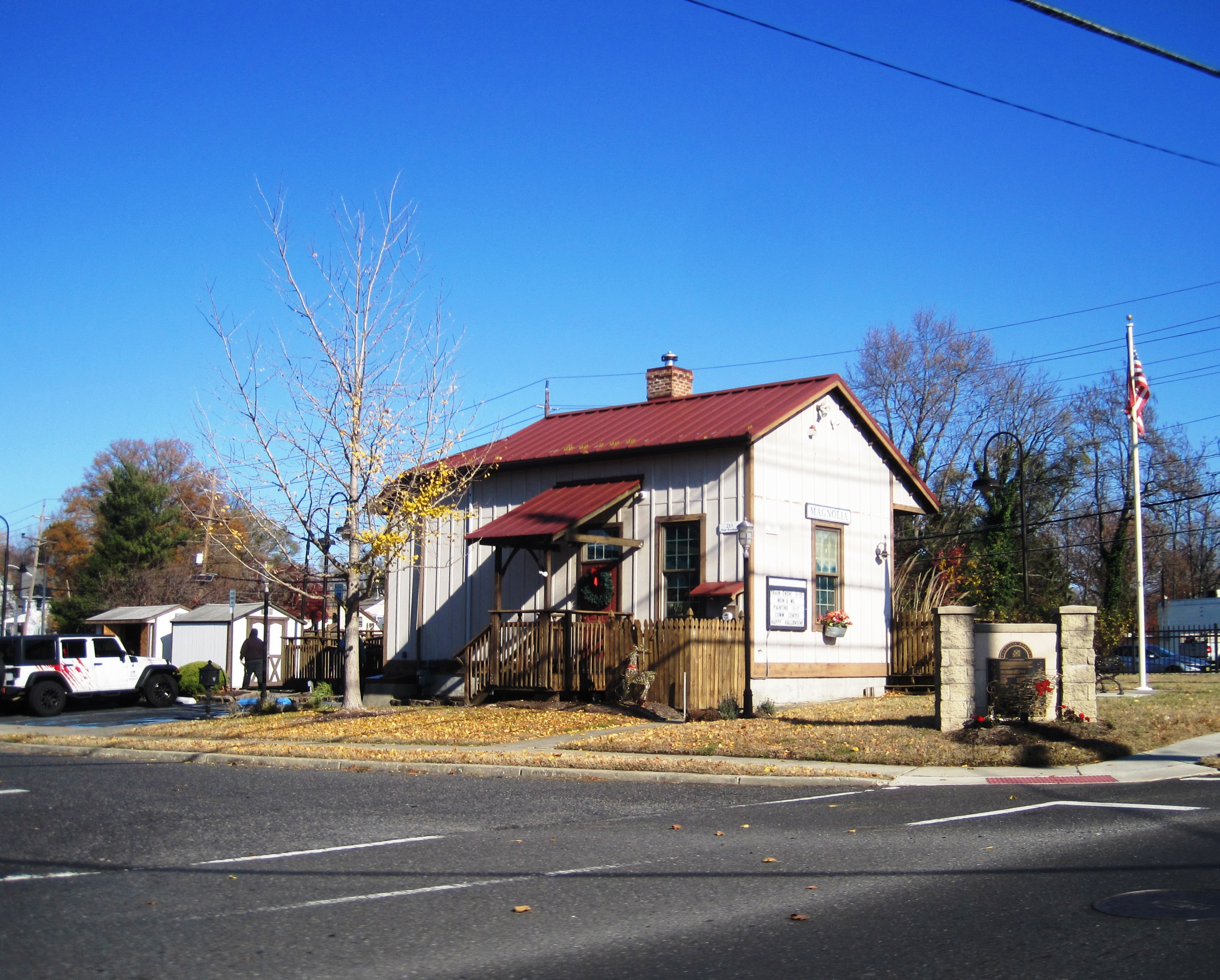
- Former train station now housing the Magnolia Historical Society

- Seal
- Motto: "One Square Mile of Friendliness"
- Magnolia highlighted in Camden County. Inset: Location of Camden County in New Jersey.

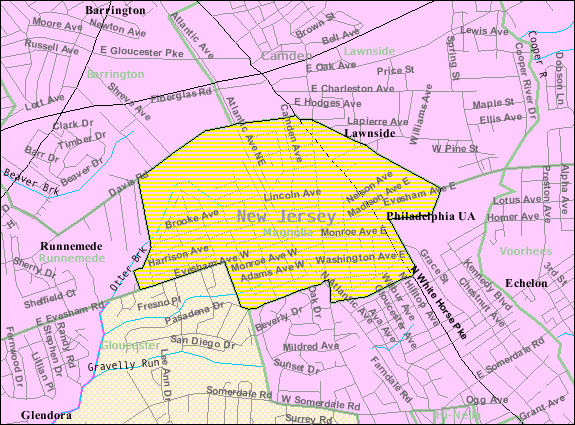
- Census Bureau map of Magnolia, New Jersey

- Location in Camden County Location in New Jersey Location in the United States
- Coordinates: 39.856195°N 75.036397°W
- Country: United States
- State: New Jersey
- County: Camden
- Incorporated: May 12, 1915

Government
  - Type: Borough
  - Body: Borough Council
  - Mayor: BettyAnn Cowling-Carson (D, term ends December 31, 2023)
  - Municipal clerk: Krystel Arana

Area
  - Total: 0.98 sq mi (2.53 km^{2})
  - Land: 0.98 sq mi (2.53 km^{2})
  - Water: 0 sq mi (0.00 km^{2}) 0.00%
  - Rank: 503rd of 565 in state 27th of 37 in county
- Elevation: 79 ft (24 m)

Population (2020)
  - Total: 4,352
  - Estimate (2023): 4,356
  - Rank: 403rd of 565 in state 25th of 37 in county
  - Density: 4,447.9/sq mi (1,717.3/km^{2})
  - Rank: 138th of 565 in state 15th of 37 in county
- Time zone: UTC−05:00 (Eastern (EST))
  - Summer (DST): UTC−04:00 (Eastern (EDT))
- ZIP Code: 08049
- Area codes: 609 and 856
- FIPS code: 3400742630
- GNIS feature ID: 0885288
- Website: www.magnolia-nj.org

Magnolia is a borough in Camden County, in the U.S. state of New Jersey. As of the 2020 United States census, the borough's population was 4,352, an increase of 11 (+0.3%) from the 2010 census count of 4,341, which in turn reflected a decline of 68 (−1.5%) from the 4,409 counted in the 2000 census.

== History ==
Magnolia was incorporated as a borough by an act of the New Jersey Legislature on April 14, 1915, from portions of the now-defunct Centre Township, and parts of Clementon, based on the results of a referendum held on May 12, 1915. The borough was named for magnolia trees that grow in the area.

Magnolia has been the site of one of seven remaining single-arch McDonald's signs in the United States, with the bulk of signs in the nation matching the company's trademarked Golden Arches.

== Geography ==
According to the United States Census Bureau, the borough had a total area of 0.98 square miles (2.53 km^{2}), all of which was land.

The borough borders the Camden County municipalities of Barrington, Gloucester Township, Lawnside, Runnemede and Somerdale.

== Demographics ==
Historical population
| Census | Pop. | Note | %± |
|---|---|---|---|
| 1920 | 1,245 | | — |
| 1930 | 1,522 | | 22.2% |
| 1940 | 1,552 | | 2.0% |
| 1950 | 1,883 | | 21.3% |
| 1960 | 4,199 | | 123.0% |
| 1970 | 5,893 | | 40.3% |
| 1980 | 4,881 | | −17.2% |
| 1990 | 4,861 | | −0.4% |
| 2000 | 4,409 | | −9.3% |
| 2010 | 4,341 | | −1.5% |
| 2020 | 4,352 | | 0.3% |
| 2023 (est.) | 4,356 | ▲ | 0.1% |
Population sources:1920–2000 1920 1920–1930 1940–2000; 2000 2010 2020

=== 2020 census ===
As of the 2020 census, Magnolia had a population of 4,352. The median age was 39.4 years. 20.2% of residents were under the age of 18 and 15.1% of residents were 65 years of age or older. For every 100 females there were 95.2 males, and for every 100 females age 18 and over there were 93.9 males age 18 and over.

100.0% of residents lived in urban areas, while 0.0% lived in rural areas.

There were 1,776 households in Magnolia, of which 29.6% had children under the age of 18 living in them. Of all households, 43.1% were married-couple households, 20.4% were households with a male householder and no spouse or partner present, and 26.7% were households with a female householder and no spouse or partner present. About 27.6% of all households were made up of individuals and 9.9% had someone living alone who was 65 years of age or older.

There were 1,877 housing units, of which 5.4% were vacant. The homeowner vacancy rate was 1.8% and the rental vacancy rate was 6.7%.

Racial composition as of the 2020 census
| Race | Number | Percent |
|---|---|---|
| White | 2,868 | 65.9% |
| Black or African American | 761 | 17.5% |
| American Indian and Alaska Native | 23 | 0.5% |
| Asian | 130 | 3.0% |
| Native Hawaiian and Other Pacific Islander | 1 | 0.0% |
| Some other race | 220 | 5.1% |
| Two or more races | 349 | 8.0% |
| Hispanic or Latino (of any race) | 497 | 11.4% |

=== 2010 census ===
The 2010 United States census counted 4,341 people, 1,710 households, and 1,147 families in the borough. The population density was 4,485.3 per square mile (1,731.8/km^{2}). There were 1,850 housing units at an average density of 1,911.5 per square mile (738.0/km^{2}). The racial makeup was 74.71% (3,243) White, 18.27% (793) Black or African American, 0.30% (13) Native American, 1.89% (82) Asian, 0.05% (2) Pacific Islander, 2.21% (96) from other races, and 2.58% (112) from two or more races. Hispanic or Latino of any race were 7.83% (340) of the population.

Of the 1,710 households, 28.1% had children under the age of 18; 45.4% were married couples living together; 15.5% had a female householder with no husband present and 32.9% were non-families. Of all households, 26.1% were made up of individuals and 8.7% had someone living alone who was 65 years of age or older. The average household size was 2.53 and the average family size was 3.08.

21.8% of the population were under the age of 18, 8.9% from 18 to 24, 29.0% from 25 to 44, 28.1% from 45 to 64, and 12.2% who were 65 years of age or older. The median age was 38.3 years. For every 100 females, the population had 93.6 males. For every 100 females ages 18 and older there were 90.8 males.

The Census Bureau's 2006–2010 American Community Survey showed that (in 2010 inflation-adjusted dollars) median household income was $53,125 (with a margin of error of +/− $7,496) and the median family income was $74,042 (+/− $10,349). Males had a median income of $49,196 (+/− $2,966) versus $38,523 (+/− $5,667) for females. The per capita income for the borough was $27,896 (+/− $1,765). About 1.0% of families and 4.7% of the population were below the poverty line, including 3.8% of those under age 18 and none of those age 65 or over.

=== 2000 census ===
As of the 2000 United States census there were 4,409 people, 1,710 households, and 1,162 families residing in the borough. The population density was 4,543.3 inhabitants per square mile (1,754.2/km^{2}). There were 1,836 housing units at an average density of 1,891.9 per square mile (730.5/km^{2}). The racial makeup of the borough was 77.00% White, 17.80% African American, 0.23% Native American, 0.93% Asian, 0.02% Pacific Islander, 1.54% from other races, and 2.47% from two or more races. Hispanic or Latino of any race were 4.06% of the population.

There were 1,710 households, out of which 30.6% had children under the age of 18 living with them, 48.4% were married couples living together, 15.1% had a female householder with no husband present, and 32.0% were non-families. 25.7% of all households were made up of individuals, and 8.4% had someone living alone who was 65 years of age or older. The average household size was 2.57 and the average family size was 3.12.

In the borough the population was spread out, with 24.7% under the age of 18, 7.9% from 18 to 24, 33.2% from 25 to 44, 21.4% from 45 to 64, and 12.8% who were 65 years of age or older. The median age was 36 years. For every 100 females, there were 93.8 males. For every 100 females age 18 and over, there were 87.8 males.

The median income for a household in the borough was $43,728, and the median income for a family was $50,791. Males had a median income of $38,480 versus $27,172 for females. The per capita income for the borough was $19,032. About 5.9% of families and 7.9% of the population were below the poverty line, including 10.9% of those under age 18 and 5.0% of those age 65 or over.

== Government ==
=== Local government ===
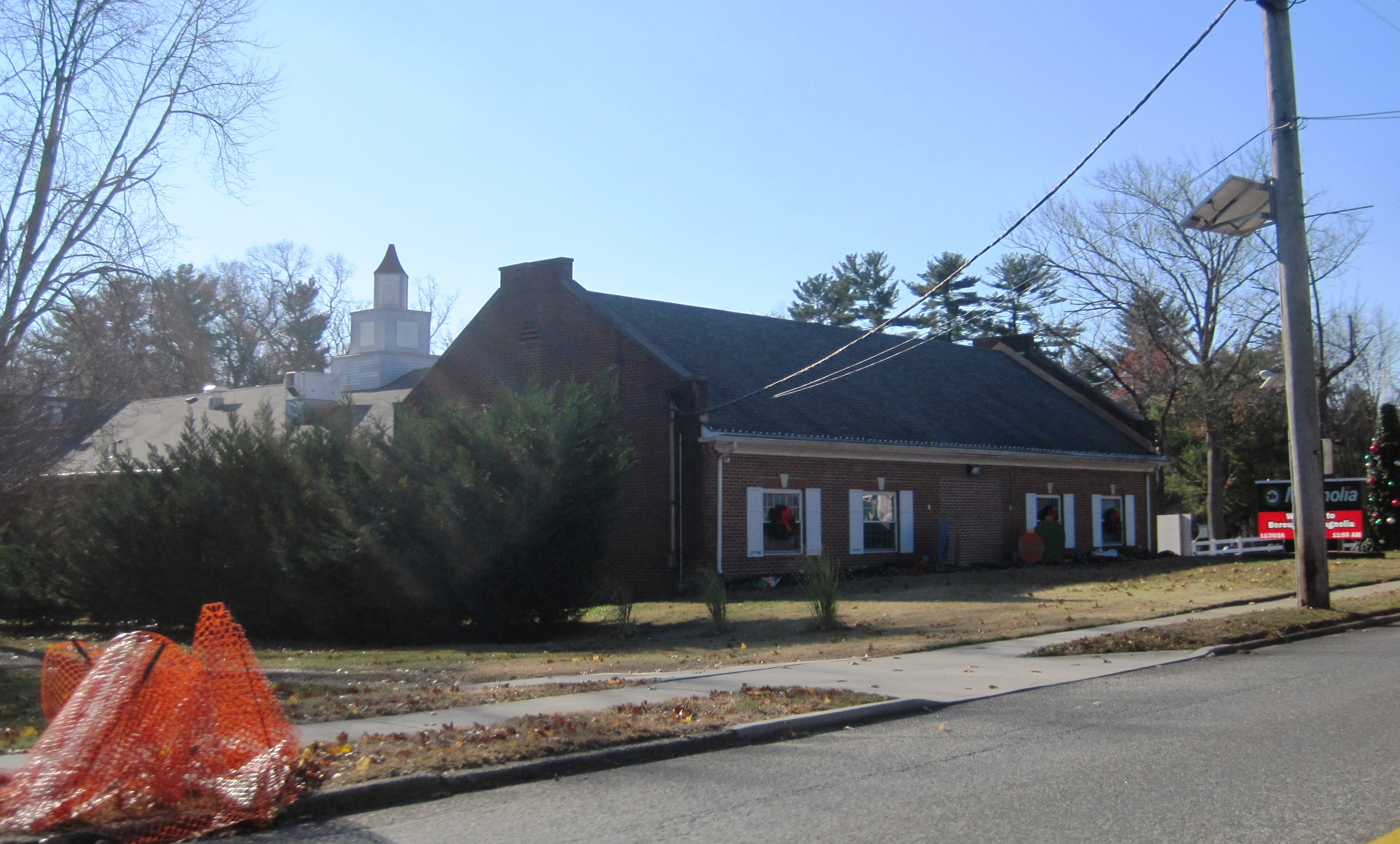
Magnolia municipal building

Magnolia is governed under the borough form of New Jersey municipal government, one of 218 municipalities (of the 564) statewide that use this form, the state's most common form of government. The governing body is comprised of a mayor and a borough council, with all positions elected at-large on a partisan basis as part of the November general election. A mayor is elected directly by the voters to a four-year term of office. The borough council includes six members elected to serve three-year terms on a staggered basis, with two seats coming up for election each year in a three-year cycle. The borough form of government used by Magnolia is a "weak mayor / strong council" government in which council members act as the legislative body with the mayor presiding at meetings and voting only in the event of a tie. The mayor can veto ordinances subject to an override by a two-thirds majority vote of the council. The mayor makes committee and liaison assignments for council members, and most appointments are made by the mayor with the advice and consent of the council.

As of 2023, the mayor of the Borough of Magnolia is Democrat BettyAnn Cowling-Carson, whose term of office ends December 31, 2023. Members of the Magnolia Borough Council are Council President Mary F. Martz (D, 2023), Paula Bonamassa (D, 2025), Anthony DePrince III (D, 2025), Shawn Parker (D, 2024), Steve Whalen (D, 2023) and Shelley Wilson (D, 2024; elected to serve an unexpired term).

In February 2022, the borough council appointed Shelley Wilson to fill the seat expiring in December 2024 that had been held by Richard Krause until he resigned from office the previous month shortly after beginning his new council term. Wilson will serve on an interim basis until the November 2022 general election, when voters will choose a candidate to serve the remainder of the term of office.

=== Federal, state and county representation ===
Magnolia is located in the 1st Congressional District and is part of New Jersey's 6th state legislative district.

For the 119th United States Congress, New Jersey's 1st congressional district is represented by Donald Norcross (D, Camden). New Jersey is represented in the United States Senate by Democrats Cory Booker (Newark, term ends 2027) and Andy Kim (Moorestown, term ends 2031).

For the 2026–2027 session, the 6th legislative district of the New Jersey Legislature is represented in the State Senate by James Beach (D, Voorhees Township) and in the General Assembly by Louis Greenwald (D, Voorhees Township) and Melinda Kane (D, Cherry Hill).

Camden County is governed by a Board of County Commissioners composed of seven members chosen at-large in partisan elections for three-year terms on a staggered basis by the residents of the county, with either two or three seats up for election each year as part of the November general election. At a reorganization meeting held in January after each election, the newly constituted Board of Commissioners selects one member to serve as Director and another as Deputy Director, each serving a one-year term in that role. As of 2025, Camden County's Commissioners are: Commissioner Director Louis Cappelli Jr. (D, Collingswood, 2026), Commissioner Deputy Director Edward T. McDonnell (D, Pennsauken Township, 2025), Virginia Ruiz Betteridge (D, Runnemede, 2025), Almar Dyer (D, Pennsauken Township, 2027), Melinda Kane (D, Cherry Hill, 2027), Jeffrey L. Nash (D, Winslow Township, 2027), and Jonathan L. Young Sr. (D, Berlin Township, 2026).

Camden County's constitutional officers are: Clerk Pamela Rosen Lampitt (D, Cherry Hill, 2029) Sheriff Chuck Billingham (D, Gloucester City, 2027) and Surrogate Michelle Gentek-Mayer (D, Gloucester Township, 2025).

=== Politics ===
As of March 2011, there were a total of 2,918 registered voters in Magnolia, of which 1,170 (40.1%) were registered as Democrats, 367 (12.6%) were registered as Republicans and 1,381 (47.3%) were registered as Unaffiliated. There were no voters registered to other parties.

Gubernatorial election results for Magnolia
| Year | Republican | | Democratic | | Third party(ies) | |
| Year | No. | % | No. | % | No. | % |
|---|---|---|---|---|---|---|
| 2025 | 576 | 31.84% | 1,218 | 67.33% | 15 | 0.83% |
| 2021 | 538 | 40.60% | 774 | 58.42% | 13 | 0.98% |
| 2017 | 326 | 31.02% | 686 | 65.27% | 39 | 3.71% |
| 2013 | 555 | 53.26% | 468 | 44.91% | 19 | 1.82% |
| 2009 | 443 | 37.20% | 640 | 53.74% | 108 | 9.07% |
| 2005 | 439 | 35.35% | 747 | 60.14% | 56 | 4.51% |

In the 2012 presidential election, Democrat Barack Obama received 69.8% of the vote (1,383 cast), ahead of Republican Mitt Romney with 29.3% (580 votes), and other candidates with 0.9% (18 votes), among the 2,002 ballots cast by the borough's 3,162 registered voters (21 ballots were spoiled), for a turnout of 63.3%. In the 2008 presidential election, Democrat Barack Obama received 66.2% of the vote (1,442 cast), ahead of Republican John McCain, who received around 30.1% (656 votes), with 2,177 ballots cast among the borough's 2,877 registered voters, for a turnout of 75.7%. In the 2004 presidential election, Democrat John Kerry received 60.7% of the vote (1,293 ballots cast), outpolling Republican George W. Bush, who received around 37.3% (795 votes), with 2,129 ballots cast among the borough's 2,887 registered voters, for a turnout percentage of 73.7.

United States presidential election results for Magnolia
| Year | Republican | | Democratic | | Third party(ies) | |
| Year | No. | % | No. | % | No. | % |
|---|---|---|---|---|---|---|
| 2024 | 866 | 37.85% | 1,389 | 60.71% | 33 | 1.44% |
| 2020 | 825 | 34.26% | 1,533 | 63.66% | 50 | 2.08% |
| 2016 | 698 | 35.40% | 1,205 | 61.11% | 69 | 3.50% |
| 2012 | 580 | 29.28% | 1,383 | 69.81% | 18 | 0.91% |
| 2008 | 656 | 30.13% | 1,442 | 66.24% | 79 | 3.63% |
| 2004 | 795 | 37.34% | 1,293 | 60.73% | 41 | 1.93% |

In the 2013 gubernatorial election, Republican Chris Christie received 53.3% of the vote (555 cast), ahead of Democrat Barbara Buono with 44.9% (468 votes), and other candidates with 1.8% (19 votes), among the 1,070 ballots cast by the borough's 3,196 registered voters (28 ballots were spoiled), for a turnout of 33.5%. In the 2009 gubernatorial election, Democrat Jon Corzine received 53.7% of the vote (640 ballots cast), ahead of both Republican Chris Christie with 37.2% (443 votes) and Independent Chris Daggett with 5.3% (63 votes), with 1,191 ballots cast among the borough's 2,942 registered voters, yielding a 40.5% turnout.

United States Senate election results for Magnolia1
| Year | Republican | | Democratic | | Third party(ies) | |
| Year | No. | % | No. | % | No. | % |
|---|---|---|---|---|---|---|
| 2024 | 777 | 34.97% | 1,411 | 63.50% | 34 | 1.53% |
| 2018 | 556 | 34.99% | 936 | 58.90% | 97 | 6.10% |
| 2012 | 509 | 26.83% | 1,363 | 71.85% | 25 | 1.32% |
| 2006 | 411 | 36.63% | 679 | 60.52% | 32 | 2.85% |

United States Senate election results for Magnolia2
| Year | Republican | | Democratic | | Third party(ies) | |
| Year | No. | % | No. | % | No. | % |
|---|---|---|---|---|---|---|
| 2020 | 825 | 34.55% | 1,539 | 64.45% | 24 | 1.01% |
| 2014 | 304 | 29.63% | 704 | 68.62% | 18 | 1.75% |
| 2013 | 210 | 34.37% | 391 | 63.99% | 10 | 1.64% |
| 2008 | 598 | 30.22% | 1,342 | 67.81% | 39 | 1.97% |

== Education ==
The Magnolia School District serves public school students in pre-kindergarten through eighth grade at Magnolia School. As of the 2018–19 school year, the district, comprised of one school, had an enrollment of 408 students and 39.1 classroom teachers (on an FTE basis), for a student–teacher ratio of 10.4:1.

For ninth through twelfth grades, public school students attend Sterling High School, a regional high school serving students from Magnolia, Somerdale, Stratford, along with students from Hi-Nella and Laurel Springs who attend as part of sending/receiving relationships. The high school is located in Somerdale. As of the 2018–19 school year, the high school had an enrollment of 958 students and 69.8 classroom teachers (on an FTE basis), for a student–teacher ratio of 13.7:1.

== Transportation ==
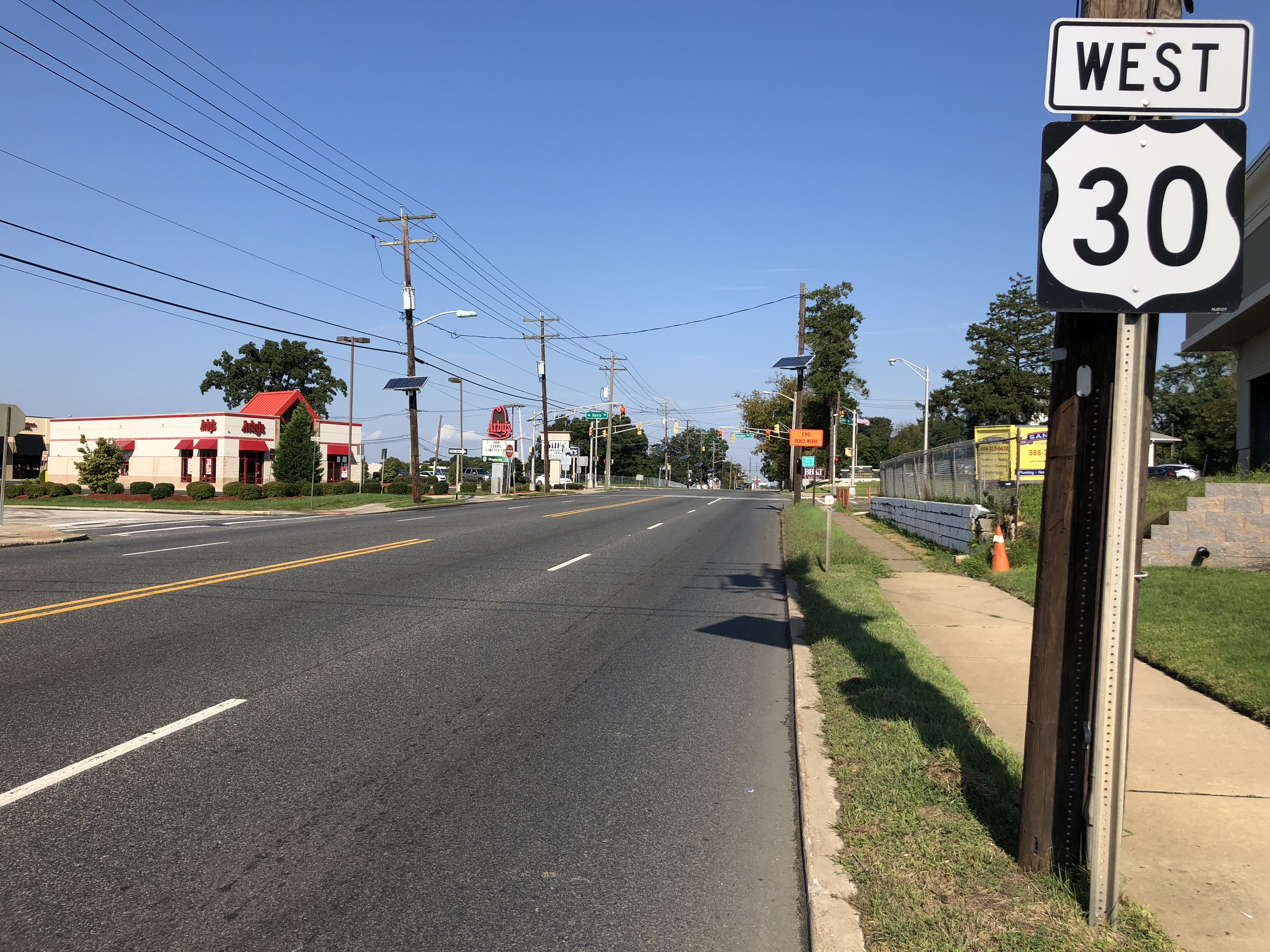
U.S. Route 30 westbound in Magnolia

=== Roads and highways ===
As of May 2010, the borough had a total of 17.53 miles (28.21 km) of roadways, of which 13.44 miles (21.63 km) were maintained by the municipality, 3.15 miles (5.07 km) by Camden County and 0.94 miles (1.51 km) by the New Jersey Department of Transportation.

U.S. Route 30 (White Horse Pike) is the main highway serving Magnolia. County Route 544 also traverses the borough.

=== Public transportation ===
NJ Transit offers bus service between Turnersville and Camden on the 403 route.

== Notable people ==
People who were born in, residents of, or otherwise closely associated with Magnolia include:

- Kristin Hunter (1931–2008), author best known for her first novel, God Bless the Child, published in 1964
- Olamide Zaccheaus (born 1997), American football wide receiver for the Atlanta Falcons of the National Football League
