= Osage, New Jersey =

Populated place in Camden County, New Jersey, US

- Unincorporated community
- Location in Camden County (Inset: Camden County in New Jersey) Osage (New Jersey) Osage (the United States)
- Coordinates: 39°51′01″N 75°00′25″W
- Country: United States
- State: New Jersey
- County: Camden
- Township: Voorhees
- Elevation: 69 ft (21 m)
- Time zone: UTC−05:00 (Eastern (EST))
  - Summer (DST): UTC−04:00 (EDT)
- GNIS feature ID: 879016

Osage is an unincorporated community located within the Echelon section of Voorhees Township in Camden County, in the U.S. state of New Jersey. The name Osage derives from a small group of Indians of the Sioux tribe from the Midwestern United States that settled in the area.

In the area of Osage is Osage Elementary School, one of four elementary schools in the township. Osage has over 500 students. It is located directly across from the Voorhees Town Center (formerly known as the Echelon Mall).
