= Four Echelon Plaza =

- U.S. National Register of Historic Places
- New Jersey Register of Historic Places
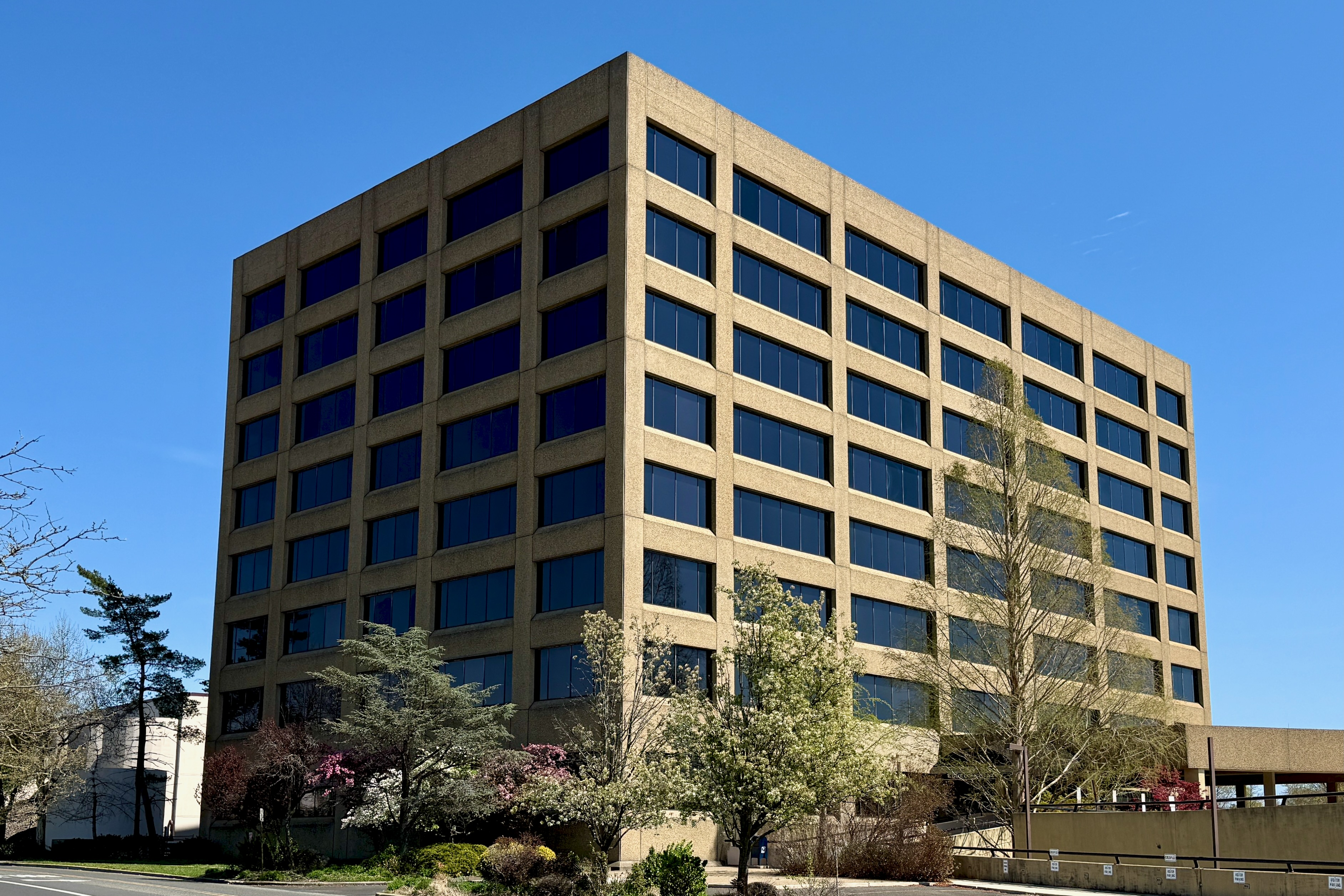

- Location within Camden County, New Jersey Location within New Jersey Location within the United States
- Location: 201 Laurel Road, Voorhees Township, New Jersey
- Coordinates: 39°50′52.4″N 75°0′6.6″W
- Built: 1975
- Architect: John C. Harkness
- Architectural style: Modern
- NRHP reference No.: 100012755
- NJRHP No.: 6109

Significant dates
- Added to NRHP: February 27, 2026
- Designated NJRHP: January 6, 2026

Four Echelon Plaza is an office building located at 201 Laurel Road in the Echelon section of Voorhees Township in Camden County, New Jersey, United States. It was added to the National Register of Historic Places on February 27, 2026, for its significance in architecture. Featuring Modern architecture, it was designed by architect John C. Harkness and completed in 1975.

== History and description ==
Four Echelon Plaza is one of the largest buildings in the Echelon Town Center, now known as the Voorhees Town Center. The planned community center was built on the site of the former Echelon Airfield by The Rouse Company starting in 1970. The building design by John C. Harkness, a co-founder of The Architects Collaborative, featured the use of precast concrete. The first occupant of the building was United Engineers.

== See also ==
- National Register of Historic Places listings in Camden County, New Jersey
