= Kresson =

Kresson may refer to:

- Kresson, Baltimore, a neighborhood in Baltimore, Maryland
- Kresson, New Jersey, an unincorporated area in Voorhees Township, New Jersey
  - Kresson Golf Course, a golf course in the area
  - Kresson Lake, a lake in the area
