= United States Avenue Trail =

- Length: 2.0 mi (3.2 km)
- Location: Camden County, New Jersey
- Trailheads: Foster Avenue in Gibbsboro, New Jersey and Egg Harbor Road in Lindenwold, New Jersey
- Use: Hiking, Cycling
- Difficulty: Easy
- Season: Year round
- Surface: Asphalt

The United States Avenue Trail is a multi-use trail in Camden County, New Jersey, and is part of the Gibbsboro Greenway collection of trails. The United States Avenue Trail is also known as the Green Trail within the Greenway collection. The trail's current length is 2.0 miles (3.2 km). The name of the trail is derived from the roadway which it parallels.

The trail runs between Foster Avenue in Gibbsboro, New Jersey and Egg Harbor Road in Lindenwold, New Jersey.

== History ==
The bike way runs along South United States Avenue on the right-of-way of a railway corridor abandoned in 1978 when the Sherwin-Williams paint factory closed. The rail corridor was originally part of the Camden and Atlantic Railroad, that was eventually incorporated into the Pennsylvania Railroad, and ultimately into Conrail before its abandonment.

The railway was originally installed to bring workers to Gibbsboro from nearby Lucaston by horse drawn rail carriage.
