= Camden County Public Library =

Camden County Public Library may refer to:

- Camden County Library, the county library system located in Camden County, New Jersey
- Camden Public Library, the public library serving Camden, Maine
- Camden County Public Library, a branch in the Three Rivers Regional Library System in Georgia
