= Echelon, New Jersey =

Populated place in Camden County, New Jersey, US

- Census-designated place
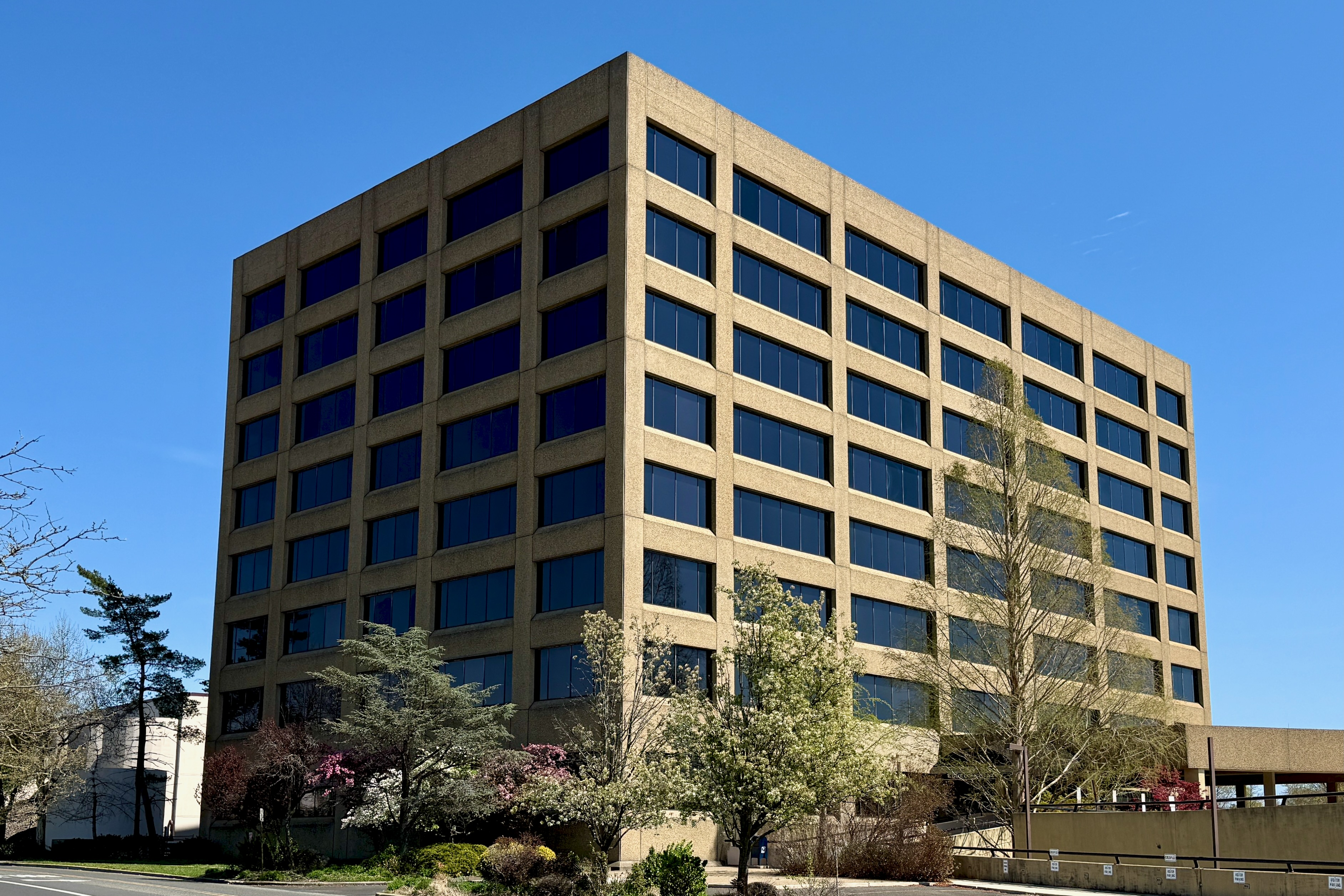
- Four Echelon Plaza, listed on the National Register of Historic Places

- Map of Echelon CDP in Camden County. Right: Location of Camden County in New Jersey.

- Location in Camden County Location in New Jersey Location in the United States
- Coordinates: 39.847836°N 74.997249°W
- Country: United States
- State: New Jersey
- County: Camden
- Township: Voorhees

Area
  - Total: 2.84 sq mi (7.35 km^{2})
  - Land: 2.80 sq mi (7.24 km^{2})
  - Water: 0.042 sq mi (0.11 km^{2}) 0.84%
- Elevation: 85 ft (26 m)

Population (2020)
  - Total: 11,896
  - Density: 4,253.7/sq mi (1,642.35/km^{2})
- Time zone: UTC−05:00 (Eastern (EST))
  - Summer (DST): UTC−04:00 (EDT)
- ZIP Code: 08043 - Voorhees
- Area code: 856
- FIPS code: 34-19900
- GNIS feature ID: 02389457

Echelon is an unincorporated community and census-designated place (CDP) located within Voorhees Township in Camden County, in the U.S. state of New Jersey. As of the 2020 census, Echelon had a population of 11,896.

The Voorhees Town Center (formerly known as Echelon Mall) is located in Echelon. The mall offers 730,000 square feet (68,000 m^{2}) of shopping, with Boscov's as the only anchor store as of 2017, as well as the Voorhees Township municipal offices.

== Geography ==
According to the United States Census Bureau, Echelon had a total area of 2.836 square miles (7.35 km^{2}), including 2.812 square miles (7.28 km^{2}) is land and 0.024 square miles (0.062 km^{2}) is water (0.85%).

== Demographics ==
Historical population
Census	Pop.	Note	%±
2000	10,440		—
2010	10,743		2.9%
2020	11,896		10.7%
Population sources: 2000 2010 2020

Echelon first appeared as a census designated place in the 2000 U.S. census.

=== Racial and ethnic composition ===
Echelon CDP, New Jersey – Racial and ethnic composition Note: the US Census treats Hispanic/Latino as an ethnic category. This table excludes Latinos from the racial categories and assigns them to a separate category. Hispanics/Latinos may be of any race.
Race / Ethnicity (NH = Non-Hispanic)	Pop 2000	Pop 2010	Pop 2020	% 2000	% 2010	% 2020
White alone (NH)	7,484	6,597	6,082	71.69%	61.41%	51.13%
Black or African American alone (NH)	1,048	1,244	1,428	10.04%	11.58%	12.00%
Native American or Alaska Native alone (NH)	18	19	11	0.17%	0.18%	0.09%
Asian alone (NH)	1,375	2,086	2,966	13.17%	19.42%	24.93%
Native Hawaiian or Pacific Islander alone (NH)	2	6	4	0.02%	0.06%	0.03%
Other race alone (NH)	15	33	60	0.14%	0.31%	0.50%
Mixed race or Multiracial (NH)	181	282	421	1.73%	2.62%	3.54%
Hispanic or Latino (any race)	317	476	924	3.04%	4.43%	7.77%
Total	10,440	10,743	11,896	100.00%	100.00%	100.00%

=== 2020 census ===
As of the 2020 census, Echelon had a population of 11,896. The median age was 37.8 years. 18.0% of residents were under the age of 18 and 17.6% of residents were 65 years of age or older. For every 100 females there were 89.3 males, and for every 100 females age 18 and over there were 86.8 males age 18 and over.

100.0% of residents lived in urban areas, while 0.0% lived in rural areas.

There were 5,399 households in Echelon, of which 25.2% had children under the age of 18 living in them. Of all households, 36.0% were married-couple households, 22.4% were households with a male householder and no spouse or partner present, and 34.0% were households with a female householder and no spouse or partner present. About 41.1% of all households were made up of individuals and 15.4% had someone living alone who was 65 years of age or older.

There were 5,778 housing units, of which 6.6% were vacant. The homeowner vacancy rate was 0.9% and the rental vacancy rate was 6.9%.

=== 2010 census ===
The 2010 United States census counted 10,743 people, 4,943 households, and 2,378 families in the CDP. The population density was 3,820.5 people per square mile (1,475.1 people/km^{2}). There were 5,469 housing units at an average density of 1,944.9 units per square mile (750.9 units/km^{2}). The racial makeup was 63.86% (6,860) White, 12.02% (1,291) Black or African American, 0.24% (26) Native American, 19.49% (2,094) Asian, 0.06% (6) Pacific Islander, 1.34% (144) from other races, and 3.00% (322) from two or more races. Hispanic or Latino of any race were 4.43% (476) of the population.

Of the 4,943 households, 22.4% had children under the age of 18; 36.3% were married couples living together; 8.8% had a female householder with no husband present and 51.9% were non-families. Of all households, 43.9% were made up of individuals and 15.1% had someone living alone who was 65 years of age or older. The average household size was 2.10 and the average family size was 3.04.

18.6% of the population were under the age of 18, 7.8% from 18 to 24, 32.1% from 25 to 44, 24.5% from 45 to 64, and 17.1% who were 65 years of age or older. The median age was 38.9 years. For every 100 females, the population had 90.2 males. For every 100 females ages 18 and older there were 85.7 males.

=== 2000 census ===
As of the 2000 United States census there were 10,440 people, 4,886 households, and 2,345 families living in the CDP. The population density was 1,419.3 people/km^{2} (3,676 people/mi^{2}). There were 5,322 housing units at an average density of 723.5 units/km^{2} (1,874 units/mi^{2}). The racial makeup of the CDP was 73.54% White, 10.12% African American, 0.18% Native American, 13.27% Asian, 0.02% Pacific Islander, 0.80% from other races, and 2.06% from two or more races. Hispanic or Latino of any race were 3.04% of the population.

There were 4,886 households, out of which 22.8% had children under the age of 18 living with them, 36.8% were married couples living together, 8.5% had a female householder with no husband present, and 52.0% were non-families. 43.6% of all households were made up of individuals, and 13.4% had someone living alone who was 65 years of age or older. The average household size was 2.09 and the average family size was 3.01.

In the CDP the population was spread out, with 19.8% under the age of 18, 8.1% from 18 to 24, 38.0% from 25 to 44, 20.2% from 45 to 64, and 13.9% who were 65 years of age or older. The median age was 36 years. For every 100 females, there were 90.9 males. For every 100 females age 18 and over, there were 86.4 males.

The median income for a household in the CDP was $49,410, and the median income for a family was $63,962. Males had a median income of $46,934 versus $36,556 for females. The per capita income for the CDP was $26,850. About 4.9% of families and 8.3% of the population were below the poverty line, including 6.9% of those under age 18 and 13.2% of those age 65 or over.
