= Voorhees Township, New Jersey =

Township in Camden County, New Jersey, US

- Township
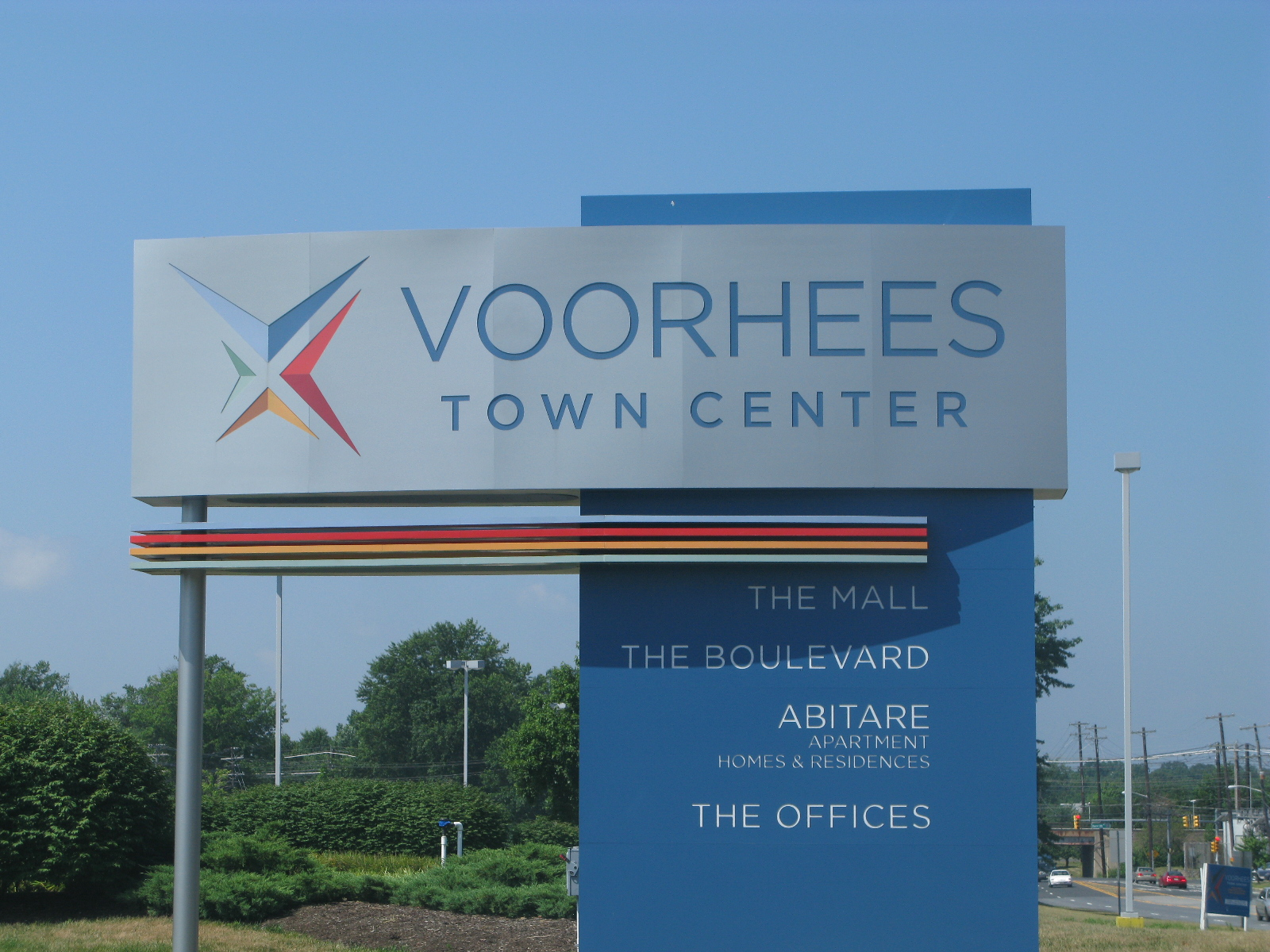
- Voorhees Town Center in Voorhees Township, July 2011

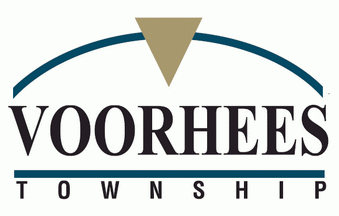
- Seal

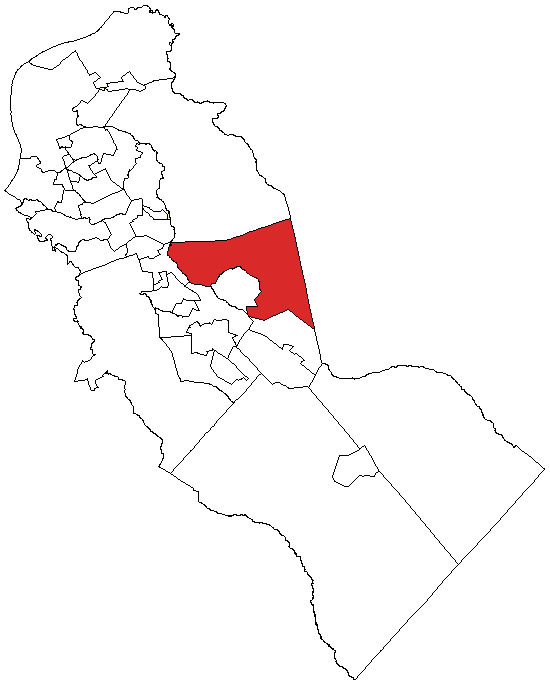
- Location of Voorhees Township in Camden County highlighted in red

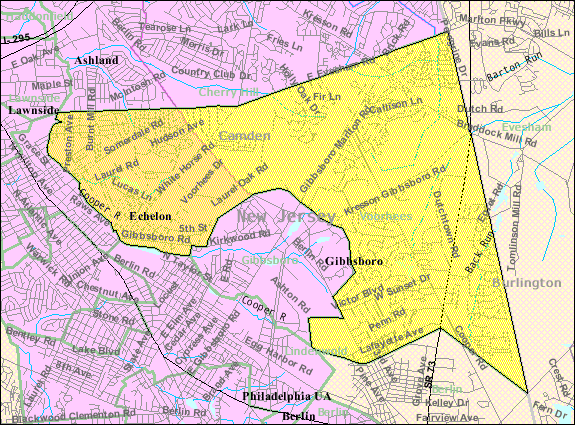
- Census Bureau map of Voorhees Township, New Jersey

- Location in Camden County Location in New Jersey Location in the United States
- Coordinates: 39.84857°N 74.952843°W
- Country: United States
- State: New Jersey
- County: Camden
- Incorporated: March 1, 1899
- Named for: Foster McGowan Voorhees

Government
  - Type: Township
  - Body: Township Committee
  - Mayor: Michael R. Mignogna (D, term ends December 31, 2026)
  - Administrator: Vacant
  - Municipal clerk: Dee Ober

Area
  - Total: 11.64 sq mi (30.15 km^{2})
  - Land: 11.47 sq mi (29.71 km^{2})
  - Water: 0.17 sq mi (0.44 km^{2}) 1.44%
  - Rank: 195th of 565 in state 6th of 37 in county
- Elevation: 112 ft (34 m)

Population (2020)
  - Total: 31,069
  - Estimate (2023): 31,169
  - Rank: 76th of 565 in state 6th of 37 in county
  - Density: 2,708.5/sq mi (1,045.8/km^{2})
  - Rank: 238th of 565 in state 28th of 37 in county
- Time zone: UTC−05:00 (Eastern (EST))
  - Summer (DST): UTC−04:00 (Eastern (EDT))
- ZIP Code: 08043
- Area code: 856
- FIPS code: 3400776220
- GNIS feature ID: 0882153
- Website: voorheesnj.com

Voorhees Township is a township in Camden County, in the U.S. state of New Jersey. The township is a suburb in the Philadelphia metropolitan area. As of the 2020 United States census, the township's population was 31,069, an increase of 1,938 (+6.7%) from the 2010 census count of 29,131, which in turn reflects an increase of 1,005 (+3.6%) from the 28,126 counted in the 2000 census.

Voorhees Township was incorporated as a township by an act of the New Jersey Legislature on March 1, 1899, from portions of Waterford Township. Portions of the township were taken on March 8, 1924, to form Gibbsboro.

The township is named for Foster McGowan Voorhees, the Governor of New Jersey who authorized its creation. The township is part of the state's South Jersey region.

== Geography ==
According to the U.S. Census Bureau, the township had a total area of 11.64 square miles (30.15 km^{2}), including 11.47 square miles (29.71 km^{2}) of land and 0.17 square miles (0.44 km^{2}) of water (1.44%).

Echelon, with a 2020 population of 11,896, is an unincorporated community and census-designated place in the western part of the township between Cherry Hill and Gibbsboro.

Other unincorporated communities, localities and places located partially or completely within the township include Ashland, Brighton Heights, Glendale, Kirkwood, Kresson and Osage.

Voorhees borders the municipalities of Berlin Township, Cherry Hill, Gibbsboro, Lawnside, Lindenwold and Somerdale in Camden County; and Evesham Township to the east in Burlington County.

=== Climate ===
Voorhees has a Humid Continental/Humid Subtropical transition climate according to (Köppen Classification) with mild to very cold winters and hot, humid summers. Temperatures have ranged from −13 to 106 °F (−25 to 41 °C).

Climate data for Voorhees
Month	Jan	Feb	Mar	Apr	May	Jun	Jul	Aug	Sep	Oct	Nov	Dec	Year
Record high °F (°C)	75 (24)	79 (26)	91 (33)	97 (36)	98 (37)	105 (41)	106 (41)	104 (40)	101 (38)	95 (35)	84 (29)	76 (24)	106 (41)
Mean daily maximum °F (°C)	41 (5)	45 (7)	54 (12)	65 (18)	74 (23)	82 (28)	87 (31)	85 (29)	78 (26)	67 (19)	57 (14)	46 (8)	65 (18)
Daily mean °F (°C)	32.5 (0.3)	35.5 (1.9)	43.5 (6.4)	53.5 (11.9)	63 (17)	71.5 (21.9)	77 (25)	75 (24)	68 (20)	55.5 (13.1)	47.5 (8.6)	37.5 (3.1)	55.0 (12.8)
Mean daily minimum °F (°C)	24 (−4)	26 (−3)	33 (1)	42 (6)	52 (11)	61 (16)	67 (19)	65 (18)	58 (14)	46 (8)	38 (3)	29 (−2)	45.1 (7.3)
Record low °F (°C)	−10 (−23)	−13 (−25)	2 (−17)	13 (−11)	25 (−4)	30 (−1)	41 (5)	42 (6)	32 (0)	20 (−7)	−7 (−22)	−10 (−23)	−13 (−25)
Average precipitation inches (mm)	3.20 (81)	2.80 (71)	3.70 (94)	3.50 (89)	3.70 (94)	3.60 (91)	4.10 (104)	4.00 (102)	3.30 (84)	2.70 (69)	3.40 (86)	3.30 (84)	41.30 (1,049)
Average snowfall inches (cm)	7.01 (17.8)	7.01 (17.8)	4.02 (10.2)	0.1 (0.25)	0 (0)	0 (0)	0 (0)	0 (0)	0 (0)	0 (0)	0.77 (2.0)	4.02 (10.2)	22.93 (58.2)
Average precipitation days	11	10	11	11	11	10	9	9	8	7	10	10	117
Average snowy days	5	4	2	0	0	0	0	0	0	0	0	2	13
Mean monthly sunshine hours	155.7	154.7	202.8	217.0	245.1	271.2	275.6	260.1	219.3	204.5	154.7	137.7	2,498.4
Percentage possible sunshine	52	52	55	55	55	61	61	61	59	59	52	47	56
Source 1:
Source 2:

== Demographics ==
Historical population
Census	Pop.	Note	%±
1900	969		—
1910	1,174		21.2%
1920	1,305		11.2%
1930	1,405		7.7%
1940	1,450		3.2%
1950	1,823		25.7%
1960	3,784		107.6%
1970	6,214		64.2%
1980	12,919		107.9%
1990	24,559		90.1%
2000	28,126		14.5%
2010	29,131		3.6%
2020	31,069		6.7%
2023 (est.)	31,169	▲	0.3%
Population sources: 1900–2000 1900–1920; 1900–1910 1910–1930; 1940–2000 2000; 2010 2020

=== 2010 census ===
The 2010 United States census counted 29,131 people, 11,470 households, and 7,433 families in the township. The population density was 2,534.9 per square mile (978.7/km^{2}). There were 12,260 housing units at an average density of 1,066.8 per square mile (411.9/km^{2}). The racial makeup was 71.77% (20,908) White, 8.70% (2,534) Black or African American, 0.15% (44) Native American, 16.13% (4,700) Asian, 0.04% (11) Pacific Islander, 0.84% (246) from other races and 2.36% (688) from two or more races. Hispanic or Latino of any race were 3.43% (998) of the population.

Of the 11,470 households, 30.0% had children under the age of 18; 53.8% were married couples living together; 8.2% had a female householder with no husband present and 35.2% were non-families. Of all households, 29.8% were made up of individuals and 12.8% had someone living alone who was 65 years of age or older. The average household size was 2.47 and the average family size was 3.14.

22.1% of the population were under the age of 18, 6.8% from 18 to 24, 24.4% from 25 to 44, 30.1% from 45 to 64, and 16.5% who were 65 years of age or older. The median age was 42.6 years. For every 100 females, the population had 90.5 males. For every 100 females ages 18 and older there were 86.8 males.

The Census Bureau's 2006–2010 American Community Survey showed that (in 2010 inflation-adjusted dollars) median household income was $82,146 (with a margin of error of +/− $6,405) and the median family income was $107,000 (+/− $4,910). Males had a median income of $72,430 (+/− $6,605) versus $51,322 (+/− $2,170) for females. The per capita income for the borough was $44,169 (+/− $2,717). About 4.0% of families and 6.1% of the population were below the poverty line, including 4.9% of those under age 18 and 12.1% of those age 65 or over.

=== 2000 census ===
As of the 2000 U.S. census, there were 28,126 people, 10,489 households and 7,069 families residing in the township. The population density was 2,424.0 inhabitants per square mile (935.9/km^{2}). There were 11,084 housing units at an average density of 955.2 per square mile (368.8/km^{2}). The racial makeup of the township was 78.26% White, 8.00% African American, 0.14% Native American, 11.44% Asian, 0.03% Pacific Islander, 0.55% from other races and 1.59% from two or more races. Hispanic or Latino of any race were 2.47% of the population.

There were 10,489 households, out of which 37.0% had children under the age of 18 living with them, 57.0% were married couples living together, 7.9% had a female householder with no husband present and 32.6% were non-families. 26.9% of all households were made up of individuals and 8.5% had someone living alone who was 65 years of age or older. The average household size was 2.60 and the average family size was 3.23.

In the township, the population was spread out, with 26.4% under the age of 18, 6.3% from 18 to 24, 31.8% from 25 to 44, 24.6% from 45 to 64 and 10.9% who were 65 years of age or older. The median age was 37 years. For every 100 females, there were 92.4 males. For every 100 females age 18 and over, there were 87.8 males.

The median income for a household in the township was $68,402 and the median income for a family was $86,873. Males had a median income of $58,484 versus $38,897 for females. The per capita income for the township was $33,635. About 3.7% of families and 5.7% of the population were below the poverty line, including 5.7% of those under age 18 and 11.1% of those age 65 or over.

== Economy ==
New Jersey American Water, previously based in Voorhees Township, is the largest water utility in New Jersey, serving over two million people in 176 communities throughout the state. New Jersey American Water is a wholly owned subsidiary of American Water.

Saddlehill Vineyard and Winery was established on the site of the Stafford Farm in 2021. The site of the winery had been given by George Washington to John Stafford in 1773, whose family farmed the land for more than two centuries.

== Sports ==
Voorhees is the home of the Flyers Training Center, the training facility for the Philadelphia Flyers of the National Hockey League. In 2018, the Flyers, renovated and expanded their training facility. Current and former players of the team often become residents of Voorhees. Voorhees includes a community park that includes a running track, children's playground, gazebo and dedicated areas for dogs.

The Philadelphia Soul of the now defunct Arena Football League practiced at the Coliseum in Voorhees.

== Government ==
=== Local government ===
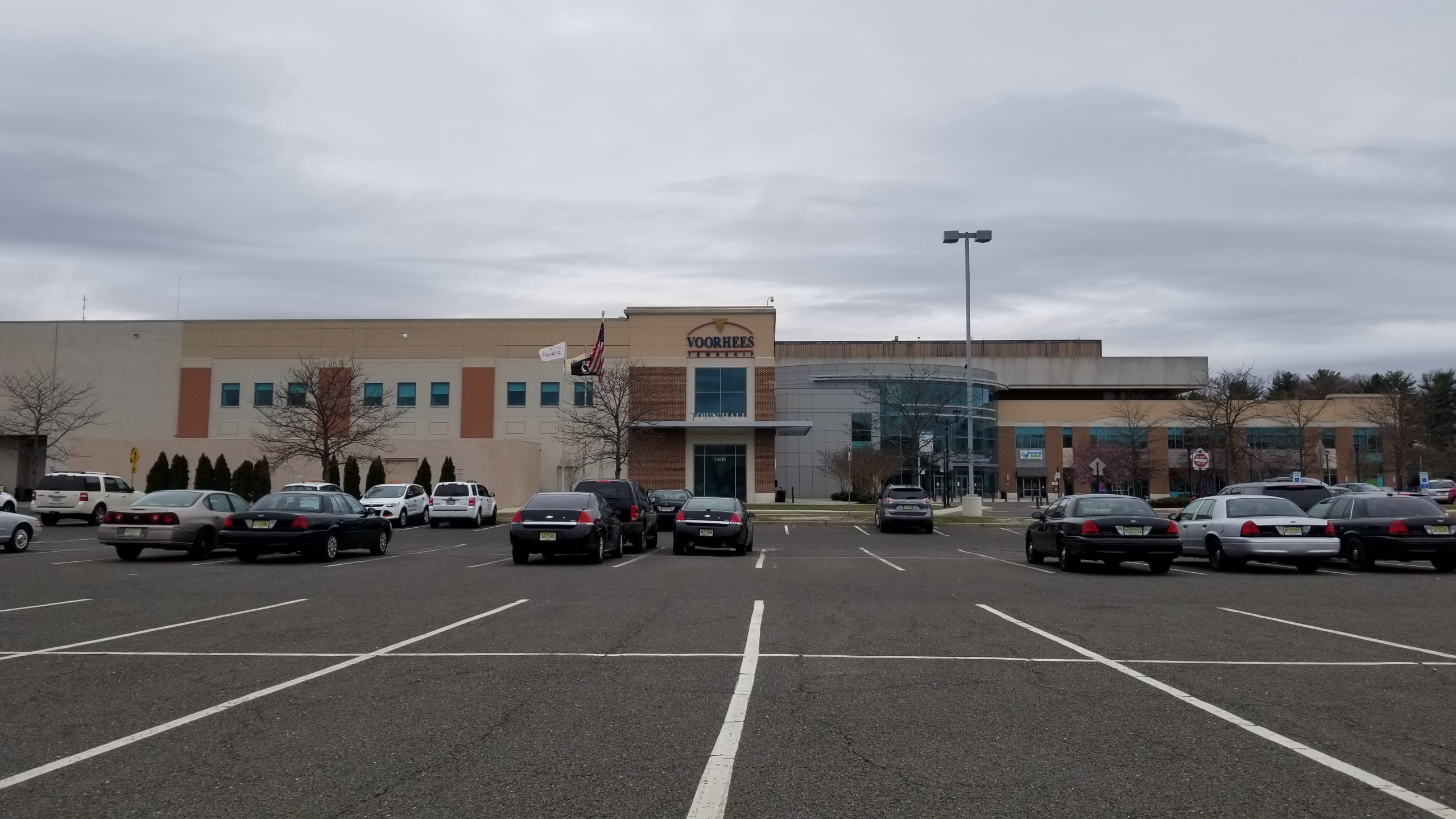
Township offices at the Voorhees Town Center

Voorhees Township is governed under the Township form of New Jersey municipal government, one of 141 municipalities (of the 564) statewide that use this form, the second-most commonly used form of government in the state. The Township Committee is comprised of five members, who are elected directly by the voters at-large in partisan elections to serve three-year terms of office on a staggered basis, with either one or two seats coming up for election each year as part of the November general election in a three-year cycle. The Mayor and Deputy Mayors are chosen by the Township Committee from among its members during the Reorganization meeting each January.

As of 2023, the members of the Voorhees Township Committee are Mayor Michael R. Mignogna (D, term on committee and as mayor ends December 31, 2023), Deputy Mayor Michelle M. Nocito (D, term on committee ends 2024; term as deputy mayor ends 2023), Deputy Mayor Jason A. Ravitz (D, term on committee ends 2024; term as deputy mayor ends 2023), Jacklyn Fetbroyt (D, 2025) and Harry A. Platt (D, 2023).

The township's municipal building is located at the Voorhees Town Center (formerly Echelon Mall) having moved there in 2011. The previous municipal building was located at 620 Berlin Road.

=== Federal, state and county representation ===
Voorhees Township is located in the 1st Congressional District and is part of New Jersey's 6th state legislative district.

For the 119th United States Congress, New Jersey's 1st congressional district is represented by Donald Norcross (D, Camden). New Jersey is represented in the United States Senate by Democrats Cory Booker (Newark, term ends 2027) and Andy Kim (Moorestown, term ends 2031).

For the 2026–2027 session, the 6th legislative district of the New Jersey Legislature is represented in the State Senate by James Beach (D, Voorhees Township) and in the General Assembly by Louis Greenwald (D, Voorhees Township) and Melinda Kane (D, Cherry Hill).

Camden County is governed by a Board of County Commissioners composed of seven members chosen at-large in partisan elections for three-year terms on a staggered basis by the residents of the county, with either two or three seats up for election each year as part of the November general election. At a reorganization meeting held in January after each election, the newly constituted Board of Commissioners selects one member to serve as Director and another as Deputy Director, each serving a one-year term in that role. As of 2025, Camden County's Commissioners are: Commissioner Director Louis Cappelli Jr. (D, Collingswood, 2026), Commissioner Deputy Director Edward T. McDonnell (D, Pennsauken Township, 2025), Virginia Ruiz Betteridge (D, Runnemede, 2025), Almar Dyer (D, Pennsauken Township, 2027), Melinda Kane (D, Cherry Hill, 2027), Jeffrey L. Nash (D, Winslow Township, 2027), and Jonathan L. Young Sr. (D, Berlin Township, 2026).

Camden County's constitutional officers are: Clerk Pamela Rosen Lampitt (D, Cherry Hill, 2029) Sheriff Chuck Billingham (D, Gloucester City, 2027) and Surrogate Michelle Gentek-Mayer (D, Gloucester Township, 2025).

=== Politics ===
As of March 2011, there were a total of 19,762 registered voters in Voorhees Township, of which 7,392 (37.4%) were registered as Democrats, 3,129 (15.8%) were registered as Republicans and 9,229 (46.7%) were registered as Unaffiliated. There were 12 voters registered as Libertarians or Greens.

Gubernatorial election results for Voorhees Township
Year	Republican		Democratic		Third party(ies)	
Year	No.	%	No.	%	No.	%
2025	3,993	32.04%	8,401	67.41%	68	0.55%
2021	3,619	36.83%	6,157	62.66%	50	0.51%
2017	2,678	34.11%	5,034	64.13%	138	1.76%
2013	4,679	61.36%	2,851	37.39%	95	1.25%
2009	3,645	44.19%	4,126	50.02%	477	5.78%
2005	3,195	41.73%	4,241	55.39%	220	2.87%

In the 2012 presidential election, Democrat Barack Obama received 60.3% of the vote (8,479 cast), ahead of Republican Mitt Romney with 38.7% (5,450 votes) and other candidates with 1.0% (137 votes), among the 14,160 ballots cast by the township's 21,493 registered voters (94 ballots were spoiled), for a turnout of 65.9%. In the 2008 presidential election, Democrat Barack Obama received 61.1% of the vote (9,028 cast), ahead of Republican John McCain, who received around 35.3% (5,216 votes), with 14,768 ballots cast among the township's 19,553 registered voters, for a turnout of 75.5%. In the 2004 presidential election, Democrat John Kerry received 57.5% of the vote (7,835 ballots cast), outpolling Republican George W. Bush, who received around 40.2% (5,475 votes), with 13,628 ballots cast among the township's 18,325 registered voters, for a turnout percentage of 74.4.

United States presidential election results for Voorhees Township
Year	Republican		Democratic		Third party(ies)	
Year	No.	%	No.	%	No.	%
2024	5,633	35.20%	10,044	62.76%	328	2.05%
2020	5,581	32.35%	11,464	66.45%	206	1.19%
2016	5,050	34.75%	9,037	62.18%	447	3.08%
2012	5,450	38.75%	8,479	60.28%	137	0.97%
2008	5,216	35.32%	9,028	61.13%	524	3.55%
2004	5,475	40.17%	7,835	57.49%	318	2.33%

In the 2013 gubernatorial election, Republican Chris Christie received 61.4% of the vote (4,679 cast), ahead of Democrat Barbara Buono with 37.4% (2,851 votes) and other candidates with 1.2% (95 votes), among the 7,845 ballots cast by the township's 21,636 registered voters (220 ballots were spoiled), for a turnout of 36.3%. In the 2009 gubernatorial election, Democrat Jon Corzine received 50.% of the vote (4,126 ballots cast), ahead of both Republican Chris Christie with 44.2% (3,645 votes) and Independent Chris Daggett with 3.8% (315 votes), with 8,248 ballots cast among the township's 19,611 registered voters, yielding a 42.1% turnout.

United States Senate election results for Voorhees Township1
Year	Republican		Democratic		Third party(ies)	
Year	No.	%	No.	%	No.	%
2024	5,137	32.87%	10,234	65.48%	258	1.65%
2018	4,431	36.69%	7,085	58.67%	561	4.65%
2012	4,921	36.47%	8,421	62.41%	150	1.11%
2006	3,252	39.04%	4,959	59.53%	119	1.43%

United States Senate election results for Voorhees Township2
Year	Republican		Democratic		Third party(ies)	
Year	No.	%	No.	%	No.	%
2020	5,810	34.10%	11,097	65.13%	130	0.76%
2014	3,054	39.31%	4,638	59.69%	78	1.00%
2013	1,822	37.73%	2,963	61.36%	44	0.91%
2008	5,265	38.70%	8,196	60.25%	143	1.05%

== Points of interest ==
The Glendale Methodist Episcopal Church, built in 1855 with Greek Revival style, was listed on the National Register of Historic Places in 1995.

Four Echelon Plaza, an office building across from the Voorhees Town Center, was listed on the NRHP in 2026.

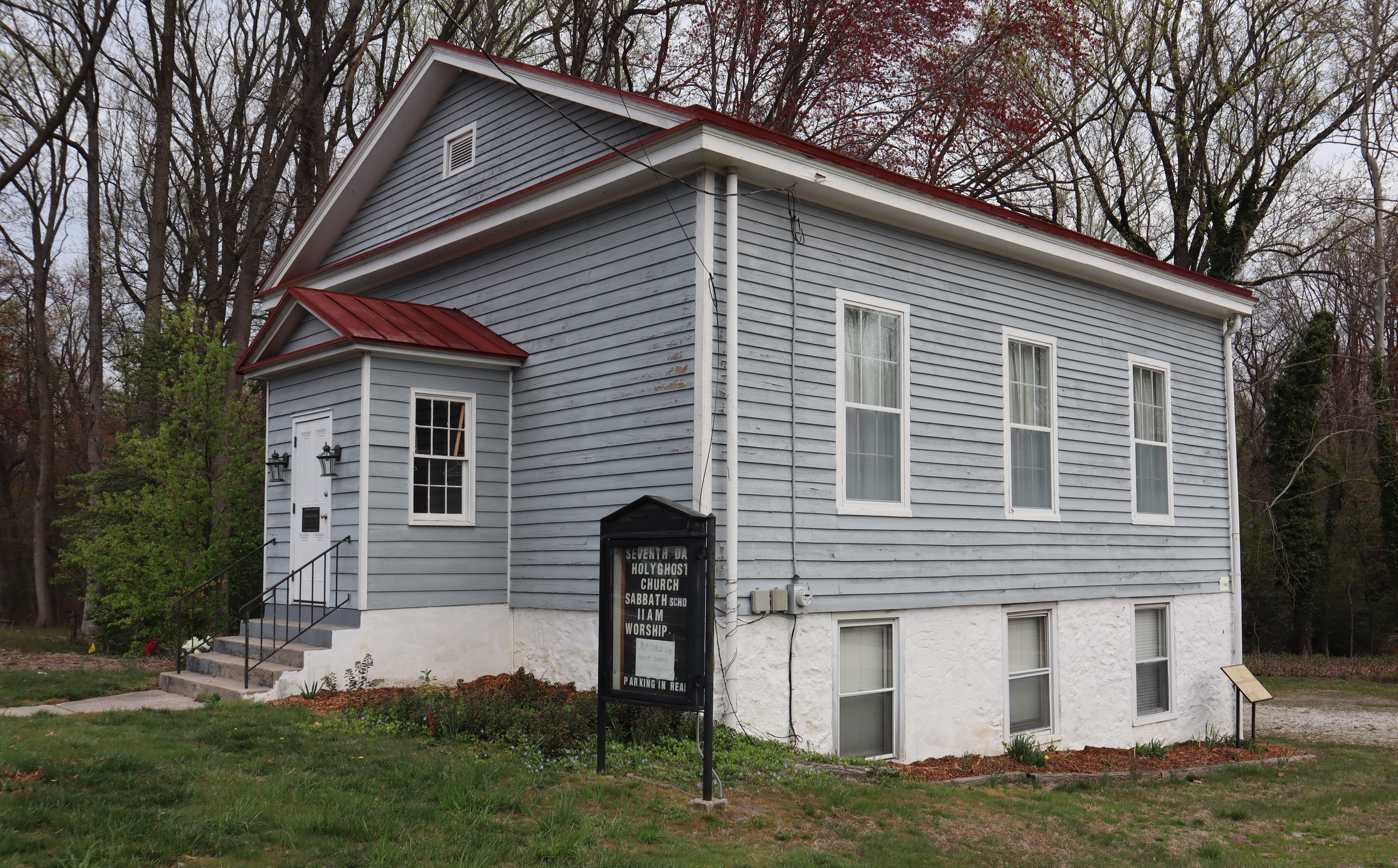
Glendale Methodist Episcopal Church

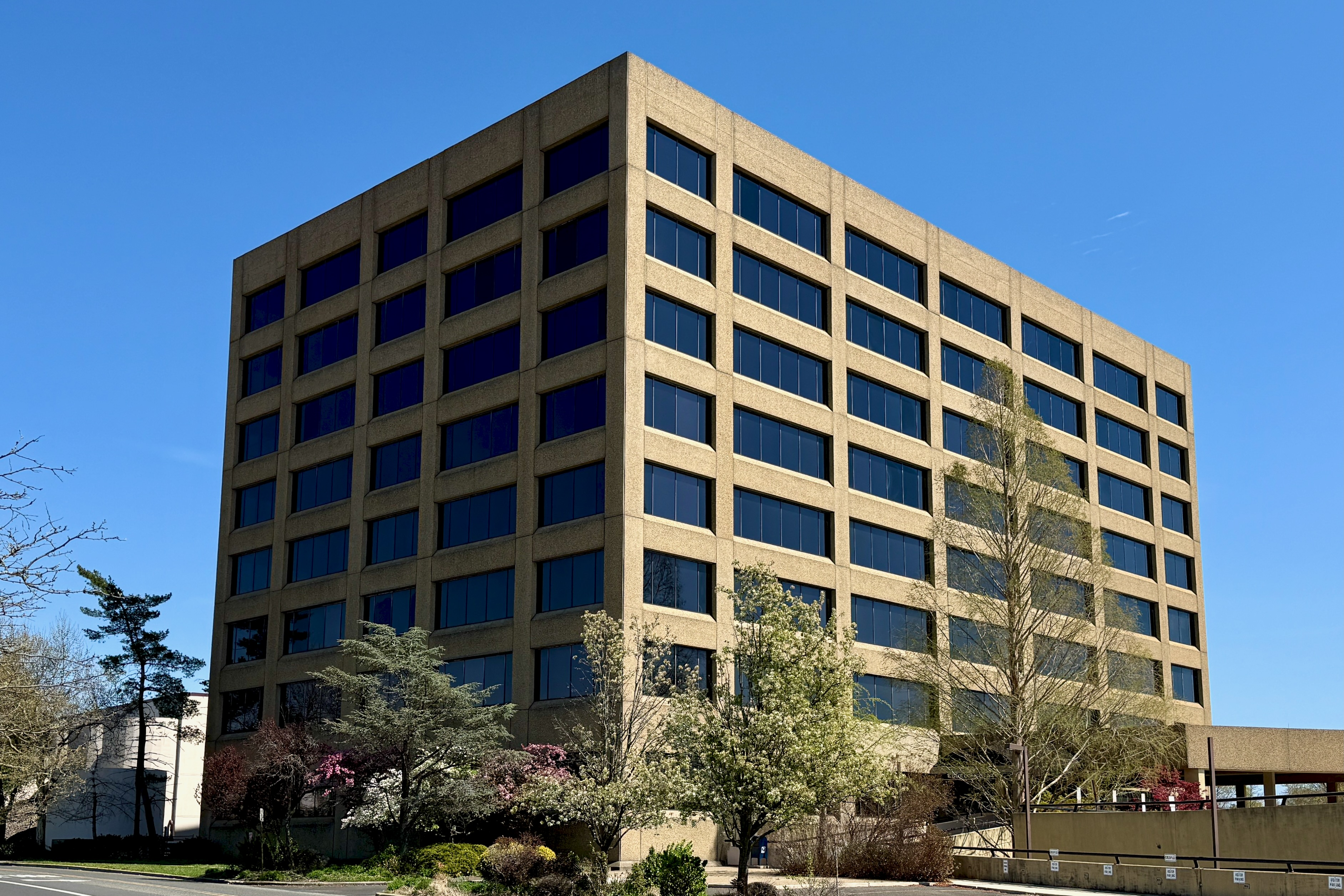
Four Echelon Plaza

== Education ==
Students in pre-kindergarten through eighth grade attend the Voorhees Township Public Schools. As of the 2019–20 school year, the district, comprised of five schools, had an enrollment of 2,976 students and 228.6 classroom teachers (on an FTE basis), for a student–teacher ratio of 13.0:1. Schools in the district (with 2019–20 enrollment data from the National Center for Education Statistics) are Edward T. Hamilton Elementary School with 384 students in grades K–5, Kresson Elementary School with 382 students in grades K–5, Osage Elementary School with 684 students in grades K–5, Signal Hill Elementary School with 485 students in grades Pre-K–5 and Voorhees Middle School with 1,018 students in grades 6–8. For the 2003–2004 school year, Edward T. Hamilton Elementary School was recognized as a National Blue Ribbon School by the United States Department of Education, one of 233 selected nationwide.

Public school students in ninth through twelfth grades attend the Eastern Camden County Regional High School District, a limited-purpose, public regional school district that serves students at Eastern Regional High School from the constituent communities of Berlin Borough, Gibbsboro and Voorhees Township. As of the 2019–2020 school year, the high school had an enrollment of 1,928 students and 140.4 classroom teachers (on an FTE basis), for a student–teacher ratio of 13.7:1. The district's board of education is comprised of nine members who set policy and oversee the fiscal and educational operation of the district through its administration. Representation on the Board of Education is determined by the population of each of the three sending districts, with six seats allocated to Voorhees Township.

Voorhees is home to two private schools. Kellman Brown Academy, formerly Harry B. Kellman Academy, is a private Jewish day school serving children aged 3 through 8th grade which had an enrollment of 235 students as of the 2024–2025 school year. The school was founded in 1959 in association with Congregation Beth El at Parkside in Camden and has been located in Voorhees independently since October 2008.

Naudain Academy is a Montessori education program for children from preschool to kindergarten, located near Kresson Elementary School. Naudain Academy first opened in 1977.

The largest branch of the Camden County Library is located in Voorhees. Officially named the M. Allan Vogelson Regional Branch, it was established in 1969.

== Infrastructure ==
=== Transportation ===
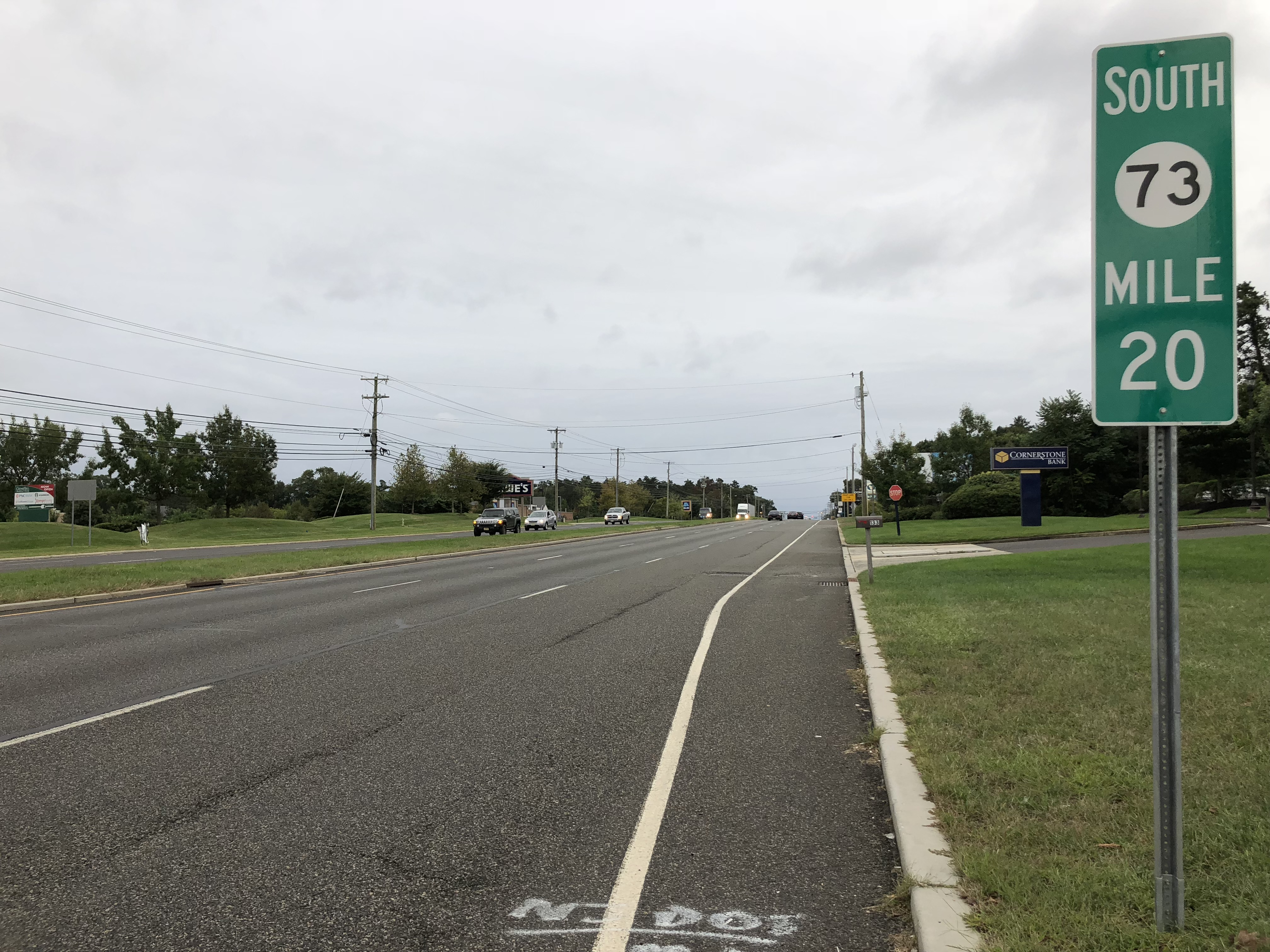
Route 73 southbound in Voorhees Township

==== Roads and highways ====
As of May 2010, the township had a total of 119.81 miles (192.82 km) of roadways, of which 96.90 miles (155.95 km) were maintained by the municipality, 20.50 miles (32.99 km) by Camden County and 2.41 miles (3.88 km) by the New Jersey Department of Transportation.

The only major highway that passes through Voorhees is Route 73 (Berlin-Kresson Road), which travels from the southern border with Berlin Township towards Evesham Township in Burlington County. Interstate 295 and Route 70 provide access to nearby Philadelphia via Cherry Hill. Exit 32 of Interstate 295 is partially signed for Voorhees, though motorists can also use exits 29A (U.S. Route 30/Berlin), 31 (Woodcrest Station) or 36 (Route 73) to access parts of the township.

County Route 544 (Evesham Road) runs along the border with Cherry Hill on the north side of the township and County Route 561 (Haddonfield-Berlin Road) clips the southwest corner of the township, from Berlin Township in the south, passes through Gibbsboro, reenters the township's northwest corner before heading into Cherry Hill.

==== Public transportation ====
One station on the PATCO Speedline rail system, Ashland, is located within township limits. The Woodcrest and Lindenwold stations are also easily accessible to many residents.

NJ Transit bus service is offered between the township and Philadelphia on the 403 route, with local service provided by the 451 and 459 routes.

=== Healthcare ===
Operated by Virtua Health, an academic non-profit healthcare system, the 368-bed Virtua Voorhees Hospital on Route 73 opened in May 2011 after nearly three years of construction, with a 680,000-square-foot (63,000 m^{2}) facility built on a 40-acre (16 ha) site. The original West Jersey hospital had been built in 1973 when the area was largely rural and became Virtua West Jersey Hospital Voorhees following the 1998 merger of Memorial Health Alliance of Burlington County and West Jersey Health System that created Virtua Health. The former hospital building was demolished starting in 2012.

== Notable people ==
People (and animals) who were born in, residents of, or otherwise closely associated with Voorhees Township include:

- Amirah Ali (born 1998), soccer forward and midfielder who plays for San Diego Wave FC of the National Women's Soccer League
- Alene S. Ammond (1933–2019), politician known as "The Terror of Trenton", who served in the New Jersey Senate from the 6th Legislative District from 1974 to 1978
- Ron Anderson (born 1958), played on several NBA teams, as well as in Europe
- Eli Apple (born 1995), football cornerback for the Cincinnati Bengals
- Andrew Bailey (born 1984), All-Star closer for the Boston Red Sox, current coach for the Boston Red Sox
- Hank Baskett (born 1982), free agent wide receiver who had played for the Philadelphia Eagles
- James Beach (born 1946), member of the New Jersey Senate
- Geoff Bennett (born 1980), broadcast journalist and a co-anchor of the PBS NewsHour alongside Amna Nawaz
- Barrett Brooks (born 1972), offensive tackle for the Pittsburgh Steelers
- Stanley Brotman (1924–2014), Judge of the United States District Court for the District of New Jersey
- Chris Canty (born 1976), former professional football cornerback
- Sarah Chang (born 1980), violinist
- Prince Chunk (1998–2010), a cat that weighed as much as 44 pounds (20 kg)
- Brian Dawkins (born 1973), former free safety for the Philadelphia Eagles
- Malik Ellison (born 1996), professional basketball player for BC Kolín of the Czech National Basketball League
- Pervis Ellison (born 1967), basketball player who played for 11 NBA seasons and was the first player selected in the 1989 NBA draft
- Josh Farro (born 1987), former guitarist of the pop-punk band Paramore Currently in the band Farro.
- Zac Farro (born 1990), sole member of Half Noise and drummer of Paramore
- Joe Flacco (born 1985), quarterback who plays for the Cleveland Browns of the National Football League
- Tom Flacco (born 1994), quarterback for the Saskatchewan Roughriders of the Canadian Football League
- Christina Foggie (born 1992), professional basketball player, who was drafted in 2014 by the Minnesota Lynx of the WNBA
- English Gardner (born 1992), track and field sprinter who specializes in the 100-meter dash
- Arie Gill-Glick (1930–2016), Israeli Olympic runner
- Mike Golic Jr. (born 1989), football offensive guard for the Arizona Rattlers of the Arena Football League
- Scott Graham (born 1965), former sports broadcaster for the Philadelphia Phillies
- Louis Greenwald (born 1967), politician who represents the 6th Legislative District in the New Jersey General Assembly
- Justin Hagenman (born 1996), professional baseball pitcher for the New York Mets
- Dana Hall (born 1969), jazz drummer, percussionist, composer, bandleader and ethnomusicologist
- Elie Honig, attorney and CNN senior legal analyst
- Ron Jaworski (born 1951), former NFL player on the Philadelphia Eagles
- Jill Kelley (born 1975), socialite whose emails led to disclosure of the Petraeus scandal
- Craig MacTavish (born 1958), former NHL hockey player
- Dawson McCartney (born 1998), soccer player
- Jimmy McGriff (1936–2008), jazz and blues organist
- Kelli McGroarty (born 2001), professional soccer player who plays as a forward for A-League Women club Melbourne City
- Leonard Neidorf (born c. 1988), philologist who specializes in the study of Old English and Middle English literature, who is an authority on Beowulf
- Tommy Paul (born 1997), professional tennis player
- Hébert Peck (born 1958), filmmaker who produced the documentary film, I Am Not Your Negro, which received a Best Documentary Feature nomination at the 89th Academy Awards
- Raoul Peck (born 1953), award-winning Haitian filmmaker
- Rev. Scott Pilarz, S.J., (1959–2021), Jesuit priest and academic who served as President of Marquette University
- Mary Previte (1932–2019), member of the New Jersey General Assembly who represented the 6th Legislative District from 1998 to 2006
- Cayden Primeau (born 1999), goaltender for the Montreal Canadiens
- Keith Primeau (born 1971), played on the Philadelphia Flyers
- Molly Schaus (born 1988), ice hockey goaltender who played for the United States women's national ice hockey team that won the silver medal at the 2010 Winter Olympics
- Lauren Schmetterling (born 1988), rower, three-time World Rowing Championships gold medalist, Olympic gold medalist
- Phillip Scott, politician who represents the 88th district in the Virginia House of Delegates
- Mel Shaw (1946–2017), racing driver who competed in the 24 Hours of Daytona and died at age 70 in a Trans-Am Series crash at Brainerd International Raceway
- Devin Smeltzer (born 1995), professional baseball pitcher for the Minnesota Twins
- Chris St. Croix (born 1979), hockey defenseman
- Adam Taliaferro (born 1982), played on the Penn State Nittany Lions football team
- Jeremy Thompson (born 1985), NFL player for the Green Bay Packers
- Madison Tiernan (born 1995), soccer midfielder who plays for Sky Blue FC of National Women's Soccer League
- Riley Tiernan, soccer forward who played for the Rutgers Scarlet Knights
- Phil Trautwein (born 1986), offensive tackle who has played for the St. Louis Rams
- Julia Udine (born 1993), actress who performed as Christine on the North American tour of The Phantom of the Opera
- John Vukovich (1947–2007), former MLB third baseman, best known for his career with the Philadelphia Phillies
- Beverly Whipple (1941–2026), sexologist, author and academic, who co-authored The G Spot and Other Recent Discoveries About Human Sexuality
- Toyelle Wilson (born 1981), assistant basketball coach with the Baylor Lady Bears basketball team
- Kelsi Worrell (born 1994), American competition swimmer specializing in the butterfly who won the gold medal in the 100-meter butterfly at the 2015 Pan American Games in Toronto
- Brandon Wynn (born 1988), artistic gymnast who won a bronze medal in the Still Rings event at the 2013 World Artistic Gymnastics Championships
