= Kresson, New Jersey =

Populated place in Camden County, New Jersey, US

- Unincorporated community
- Location in Camden County (Inset: Camden County in New Jersey) Kresson (New Jersey) Kresson (the United States)
- Coordinates: 39°51′27″N 74°55′17″W
- Country: United States
- State: New Jersey
- County: Camden
- Township: Voorhees
- Named after: George Kress
- Elevation: 89 ft (27 m)
- Time zone: UTC−05:00 (Eastern (EST))
  - Summer (DST): UTC−04:00 (EDT)
- GNIS feature ID: 877613

Kresson (formerly known as Milford) is an unincorporated community located within Voorhees Township, in Camden County, in the U.S. state of New Jersey. The community was named for George Kress, who ran a local general store. Kresson Golf Course is a public golf course located in the area, near Route 73 and Kresson Lake.

In the area of Kresson is Kresson Elementary School, one of four elementary schools in the township. Kresson has over 300 students.
