= Camden County Library =

Library system in New Jersey, US

Coordinates: 39.848165°N 75.001249°W

Camden County Library is a county library system located in Camden County, New Jersey. It is headquartered in Voorhees, New Jersey.

== History ==
The library system was established in 1921. At the time, Camden County was mostly rural. Service consisted of selecting and delivering small collections of books to schools and other locations used to supply books. The former headquarters library, located at the Camden County Courthouse, served mainly as a storage facility.

The library declined after World War II, but was revived with a new Commission who appointed a professional librarian and plans for relocation were made. In 1969, the headquarters moved to the Echelon Mall (now known as the Voorhees Town Center) in Voorhees. Then in 1977, the library moved across the street from the mall, where the current headquarters is located. In 2004, the branch was named in honor of M. Allan Vogelson, a county freeholder who developed the facility.

Effective July 1, 2019, the library system eliminated late fines for most materials, becoming the first county library system in New Jersey to do so.

== Branches ==
Branch locations are: Headquarters (Voorhees), South County Regional Branch (Atco), Bellmawr, Blackwood, Camden, Merchantville, and Westmont. The city of Camden previously had its own city library system. However, in 2010 Camden came close to being the first city in the United States to close its entire library system because of budget cuts. At the last moment, it was saved by the Camden County Library System, which agreed to take over and rescue the threatened branch and open a second branch on the Rutgers-Camden campus.

The Voorhees library conducted a book (and other media) sale each year of 30,000-50,000 items, at prices ranging from 50 cents to 3 dollars per item. It is one of the largest used-book sales in South Jersey. Book sales were discontinued in the spring of 2020.

== See also ==
- Cherry Hill Public Library
- Haddonfield Public Library
