= Kirkwood, New Jersey =

Populated place in Camden County, New Jersey, US

- Unincorporated community
- Location in Camden County (Inset: Location of Camden County in New Jersey) Kirkwood (New Jersey) Kirkwood (the United States)
- Coordinates: 39°49′52″N 74°59′29″W
- Country: United States
- State: New Jersey
- County: Camden
- Township: Voorhees
- Elevation: 69 ft (21 m)
- Time zone: UTC−05:00 (Eastern (EST))
  - Summer (DST): UTC−04:00 (EDT)
- GNIS feature ID: 877593

Kirkwood is an unincorporated community located within Voorhees Township in Camden County, in the U.S. state of New Jersey. Kirkwood once had a post office assigned United States Postal Service ZIP Code 08043. The ZIP Code has been reassigned to a post office named Voorhees that serves the entire township. Kirkwood is still a valid city name for mailing purposes.

Kirkwood developed as a bungalow community of homes near Kirkwood Lake, an impoundment of the Cooper River. Residents of nearby Philadelphia and Camden enjoyed Kirkwood as a summer escape from the cities, and many Kirkwood homes were originally Sears-Roebuck catalogue houses built as vacation homes. Most of the early homes were built in the 1915-1925 period.

As of the 2000 United States census, the population for ZIP Code Tabulation Area 08043 was 28,126.
