= Voorhees Township Public Schools =

School district in Camden County, New Jersey, US

Address
- 329 Route 73 Voorhees Township, Camden County, New Jersey, 08043
- Coordinates: 39.84699°N 74.959679°W

District information
- Grades: PreK-8
- Superintendent: Neely Hackett, Andrew Moskowitz
- Business administrator: Helen Haley
- Schools: 5

Students and staff
- Enrollment: 2,976 (as of 2019–20)
- Faculty: 228.6 FTEs
- Student–teacher ratio: 13.0:1

Other information
- District Factor Group: I
- Website: www.voorhees.k12.nj.us
| Ind. | Per pupil | District spending | Rank (*) | K-8 average | %± vs. average |
|---|---|---|---|---|---|
| 1A | Total Spending | $17,502 | 47 | $18,891 | −7.4% |
| 1 | Budgetary Cost | 14,438 | 46 | 14,159 | 2.0% |
| 2 | Classroom Instruction | 9,614 | 74 | 8,659 | 11.0% |
| 6 | Support Services | 1,896 | 28 | 2,167 | −12.5% |
| 8 | Administrative Cost | 1,299 | 15 | 1,547 | −16.0% |
| 10 | Operations & Maintenance | 1,505 | 41 | 1,612 | −6.6% |
| 13 | Extracurricular Activities | 117 | 62 | 104 | 12.5% |
| 16 | Median Teacher Salary | 76,510 | 80 | 61,136 |
Data from NJDoE 2014 Taxpayers' Guide to Education Spending. *Of K-8 districts with more than 750 students. Lowest spending=1; Highest=84

The Voorhees Township Public Schools is a comprehensive community public school district serving students in pre-kindergarten through eighth grade from Voorhees Township, in Camden County, in the U.S. state of New Jersey.

As of the 2019–20 school year, the district, comprising five schools, had an enrollment of 2,976 students and 228.6 classroom teachers (on an FTE basis), for a student–teacher ratio of 13.0:1.

The district had been classified by the New Jersey Department of Education as being in District Factor Group "I", the second-highest of eight groupings. District Factor Groups organize districts statewide to allow comparison by common socioeconomic characteristics of the local districts. From lowest socioeconomic status to highest, the categories are A, B, CD, DE, FG, GH, I and J.

Public school students in ninth through twelfth grades attend the Eastern Camden County Regional High School District, a limited-purpose, public regional school district that serves students at Eastern Regional High School from the constituent communities of Berlin Borough, Gibbsboro and Voorhees Township. As of the 2019–20 school year, the high school had an enrollment of 1,928 students and 140.4 classroom teachers (on an FTE basis), for a student–teacher ratio of 13.7:1.

== Awards and recognition ==
For the 2003-04 school year, Edward T. Hamilton Elementary School was recognized as a National Blue Ribbon School by the United States Department of Education, one of 233 selected nationwide.

== Schools ==
Schools in the district (with 2019–20 enrollment data from the National Center for Education Statistics) are:

Elementary schools

- Edward T. Hamilton Elementary School with 384 students in grades K-5
  - Mary Tadley, principal as of 2024
- Kresson Elementary School with 382 students in grades K-5
  - Stacey Morris, principal
- Osage Elementary School with 684 students in grades K-5
  - Robert A. Cranmer, principal
- Signal Hill Elementary School with 485 students in grades PreK-5
  - Sharon Stallings, principal

Middle school

- Voorhees Middle School with 1,018 students in grades 6-8
  - Alecia Inge, principal

== Administration ==
Core members of the district's administration are:

- Neely Hackett, superintendent
- Helen Haley, business administrator and board secretary

== Board of education ==
The district's board of education is comprised of nine members who set policy and oversee the fiscal and educational operation of the district through its administration. As a Type II school district, the board's trustees are elected directly by voters to serve three-year terms of office on a staggered basis, with three seats up for election each year held (since 2012) as part of the November general election. The board appoints a superintendent to oversee the district's day-to-day operations and a business administrator to supervise the business functions of the district.
