= Haddonfield Public Library =

Public library in Haddonfield, New Jersey, United States

Coordinates: 39.8990°N 75.0347°W

- Location: Haddonfield, New Jersey, United States
- Established: 1803

Other information
- Website: www.haddonfieldlibrary.org

Haddonfield Public Library is a public library in Haddonfield, New Jersey. Dating back to 1803 as the Haddonfield Library Company, it was one of the first libraries established in New Jersey. The current library building, located at 60 Haddon Avenue (adjacent to Tanner Street), opened in 1917 and was renovated in the summer of 2017. The 2.20 million dollar renovations included high-speed internet, LED lighting, elevators, and extra storage space.

The library sees approximately 120,000 visits per year and circulates around 135,000 books.

A Christmas tree lighting ceremony is held in front of the library annually in late November.
