= The Promenade at Sagemore =

New Jersey mall

Coordinates: 39.8783°N 74.9197°W

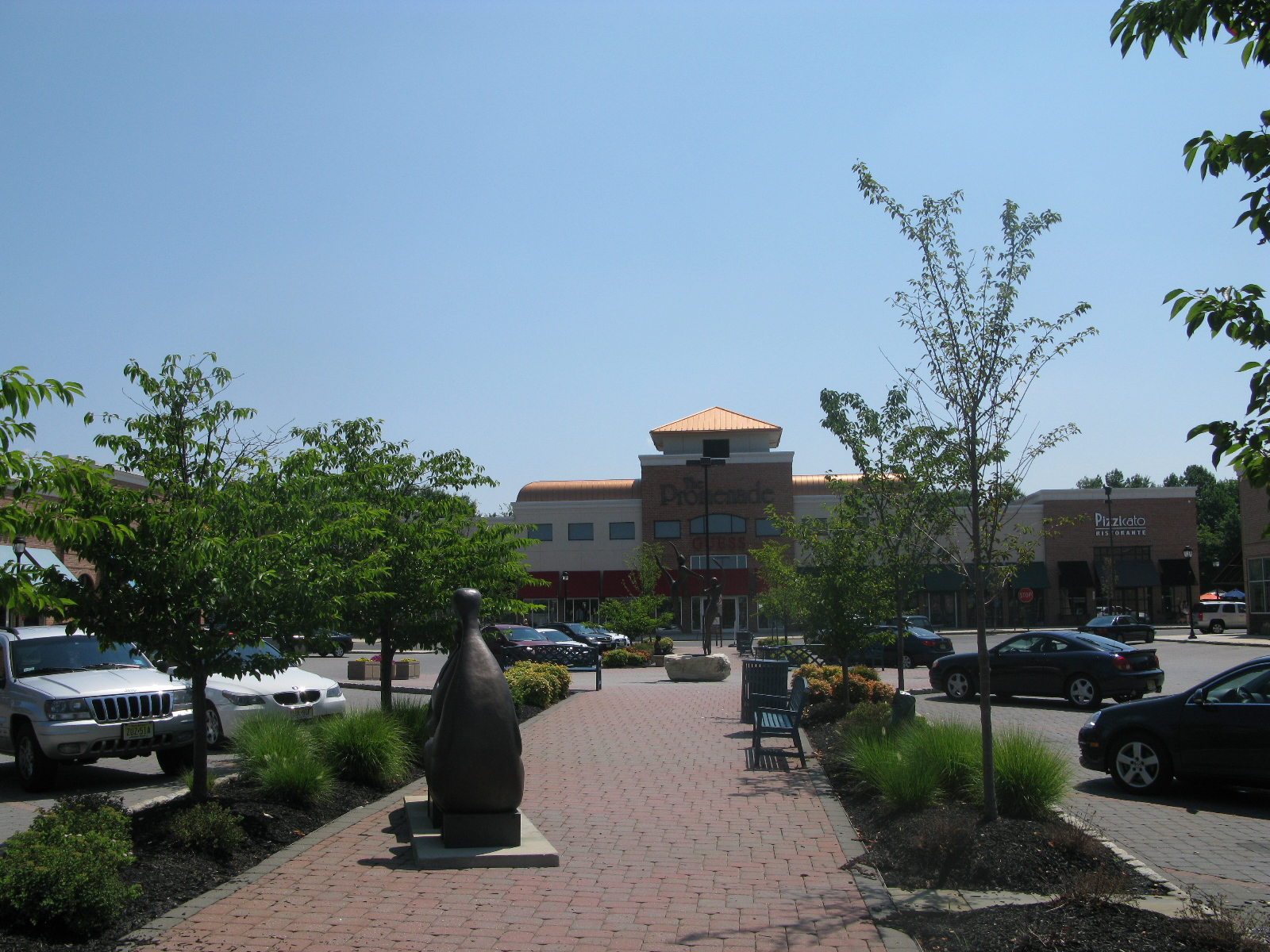
The Promenade at Sagemore on a sunny day

The Promenade at Sagemore is a large regional shopping mall located in the Marlton section of Evesham Township in Burlington County, New Jersey, United States, leased by MSC. Opened in 2001, The Promenade is an open-air lifestyle center with high-end stores and a selection of casual and sit-down dining alternatives. The mall offers 1,242 parking spots and is anchored by L.L.Bean. The mall has a gross leasable area of 272,000 ft^{2} (25,300 m^{2}).

The Promenade at Sagemore has nearly one mile of frontage on Route 73 in Evesham Township at about a mile south of Route 70. The mall is 3.5 mi (5.6 km) south of the New Jersey Turnpike via Route 73 and 3.5 mi (5.6 km) from Interstate 295. The mall is also accessible from County Route 544 (Marlton Parkway) and Brick Road.
