= Gibbsboro, New Jersey =

Borough in Camden County, New Jersey, US

- Borough
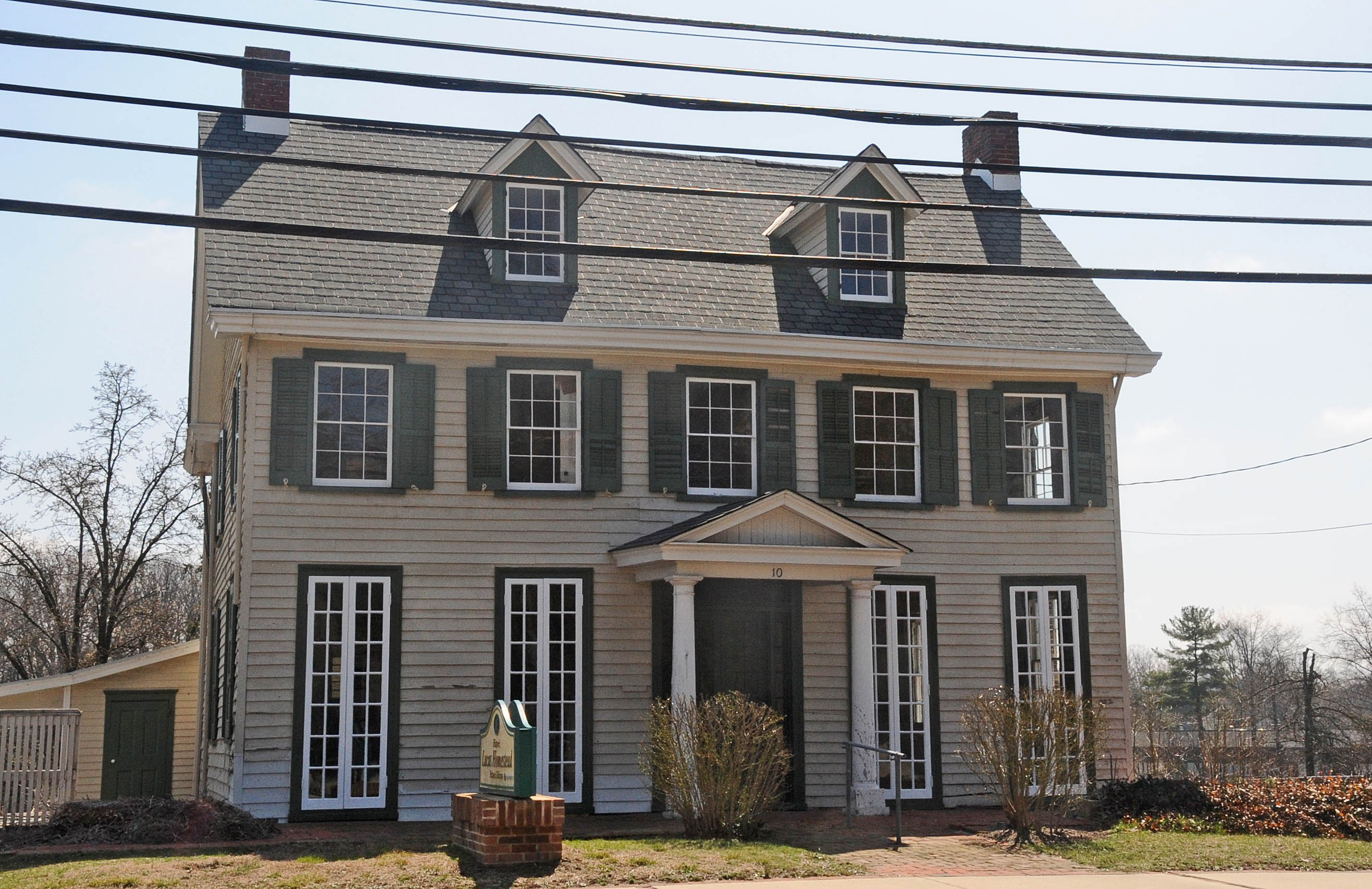
- John Lucas House in Gibbsboro

- Location of Gibbsboro in Camden County highlighted in red (right). Inset map: Location of Camden County in New Jersey highlighted in orange (left).

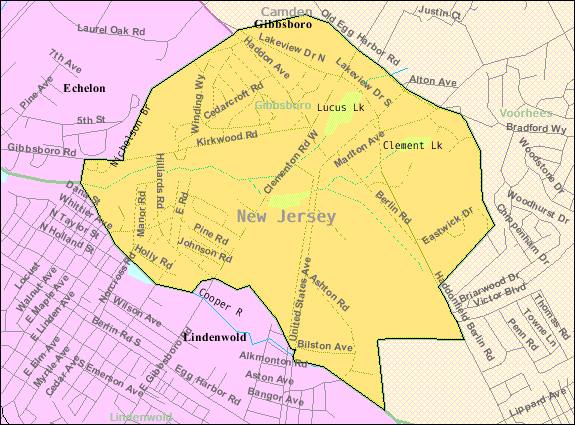
- Census Bureau map of Gibbsboro, New Jersey

- Location in Camden County Location in New Jersey Location in the United States
- Coordinates: 39.833075°N 74.965723°W
- Country: United States
- State: New Jersey
- County: Camden
- Incorporated: April 11, 1924
- Named for: Gibbs family

Government
  - Type: Borough
  - Body: Borough Council
  - Mayor: Edward G. Campbell III (I, term ends December 31, 2027)
  - Municipal clerk: Amy C. Troxel

Area
  - Total: 2.20 sq mi (5.69 km^{2})
  - Land: 2.15 sq mi (5.57 km^{2})
  - Water: 0.042 sq mi (0.11 km^{2}) 1.95%
  - Rank: 393rd of 565 in state 16th of 37 in county
- Elevation: 75 ft (23 m)

Population (2020)
  - Total: 2,189
  - Estimate (2023): 2,239
  - Rank: 480th of 565 in state 30th of 37 in county
  - Density: 1,017.2/sq mi (392.7/km^{2})
  - Rank: 384th of 565 in state 32nd of 37 in county
- Time zone: UTC−05:00 (Eastern (EST))
  - Summer (DST): UTC−04:00 (Eastern (EDT))
- ZIP Code: 08026
- Area code: 856
- FIPS code: 3400726070
- GNIS feature ID: 0885230
- Website: www.gibbsborotownhall.com

Gibbsboro is a borough in Camden County, in the U.S. state of New Jersey. As of the 2020 United States census, the borough's population was 2,189, a decrease of 85 (−3.7%) from the 2010 census count of 2,274, which in turn reflected a decline of 161 (−6.6%) from the 2,435 counted in the 2000 census.

Gibbsboro was incorporated as a borough by an act of the New Jersey Legislature on March 8, 1924, from portions of Voorhees Township, subject to approval by voters in a referendum, which was held on April 11, 1924. The borough was named for the Gibbs family, early settlers from 1706 for whom the area's post office was named when it was established in 1883.

== Geography ==
According to the United States Census Bureau, the borough had a total area of 2.20 square miles (5.69 km^{2}), including 2.15 square miles (5.57 km^{2}) of land and 0.04 square miles (0.11 km^{2}) of water (1.95%).

Gibbsboro borders Lindenwold and Voorhees Township.

== Demographics ==
Historical population
| Census | Pop. | Note | %± |
|---|---|---|---|
| 1930 | 622 | | — |
| 1940 | 713 | | 14.6% |
| 1950 | 906 | | 27.1% |
| 1960 | 2,141 | | 136.3% |
| 1970 | 2,634 | | 23.0% |
| 1980 | 2,510 | | −4.7% |
| 1990 | 2,383 | | −5.1% |
| 2000 | 2,435 | | 2.2% |
| 2010 | 2,274 | | −6.6% |
| 2020 | 2,189 | | −3.7% |
| 2023 (est.) | 2,239 | ▲ | 2.3% |
Population sources: 1930–2000 1930 1940–2000; 2000 2010 2020

=== 2020 census ===
As of the 2020 census, Gibbsboro had a population of 2,189. The median age was 42.4 years. 22.3% of residents were under the age of 18 and 19.4% of residents were 65 years of age or older. For every 100 females there were 94.9 males, and for every 100 females age 18 and over there were 91.9 males age 18 and over.

100.0% of residents lived in urban areas, while 0.0% lived in rural areas.

There were 795 households in Gibbsboro, of which 34.1% had children under the age of 18 living in them. Of all households, 59.5% were married-couple households, 11.9% were households with a male householder and no spouse or partner present, and 22.4% were households with a female householder and no spouse or partner present. About 17.1% of all households were made up of individuals and 11.1% had someone living alone who was 65 years of age or older.

There were 825 housing units, of which 3.6% were vacant. The homeowner vacancy rate was 1.4% and the rental vacancy rate was 1.4%.

Racial composition as of the 2020 census
| Race | Number | Percent |
|---|---|---|
| White | 1,839 | 84.0% |
| Black or African American | 74 | 3.4% |
| American Indian and Alaska Native | 0 | 0.0% |
| Asian | 79 | 3.6% |
| Native Hawaiian and Other Pacific Islander | 2 | 0.1% |
| Some other race | 51 | 2.3% |
| Two or more races | 144 | 6.6% |
| Hispanic or Latino (of any race) | 154 | 7.0% |

=== 2010 census ===
The 2010 United States census counted 2,274 people, 786 households, and 626 families in the borough. The population density was 1,041.9 per square mile (402.3/km^{2}). There were 809 housing units at an average density of 370.7 per square mile (143.1/km^{2}). The racial makeup was 92.61% (2,106) White, 2.15% (49) Black or African American, 0.00% (0) Native American, 2.33% (53) Asian, 0.00% (0) Pacific Islander, 0.88% (20) from other races, and 2.02% (46) from two or more races. Hispanic or Latino of any race were 4.09% (93) of the population.

Of the 786 households, 32.6% had children under the age of 18; 65.0% were married couples living together; 10.4% had a female householder with no husband present and 20.4% were non-families. Of all households, 17.2% were made up of individuals and 8.9% had someone living alone who was 65 years of age or older. The average household size was 2.89 and the average family size was 3.26.

23.0% of the population were under the age of 18, 8.3% from 18 to 24, 23.4% from 25 to 44, 30.5% from 45 to 64, and 14.8% who were 65 years of age or older. The median age was 41.7 years. For every 100 females, the population had 95.5 males. For every 100 females ages 18 and older there were 94.8 males.

The Census Bureau's 2006–2010 American Community Survey showed that (in 2010 inflation-adjusted dollars) median household income was $76,538 (with a margin of error of +/− $10,059) and the median family income was $86,481 (+/− $10,811). Males had a median income of $58,214 (+/− $13,396) versus $51,000 (+/− $12,885) for females. The per capita income for the borough was $33,258 (+/− $4,786). About 5.8% of families and 5.9% of the population were below the poverty line, including 12.0% of those under age 18 and 5.0% of those age 65 or over.

=== 2000 census ===
As of the 2000 United States census there were 2,435 people, 829 households, and 664 families residing in the borough. The population density was 1,109.3 inhabitants per square mile (428.3/km^{2}). There were 847 housing units at an average density of 385.9 per square mile (149.0/km^{2}). The racial makeup of the borough was 94.00% White, 2.79% African American, 0.41% Native American, 1.07% Asian, 0.74% from other races, and 0.99% from two or more races. Hispanic or Latino of any race were 2.38% of the population.

There were 829 households, out of which 36.6% had children under the age of 18 living with them, 67.3% were married couples living together, 9.9% had a female householder with no husband present, and 19.8% were non-families. 16.6% of all households were made up of individuals, and 6.8% had someone living alone who was 65 years of age or older. The average household size was 2.91 and the average family size was 3.28.

In the borough the population was spread out, with 25.3% under the age of 18, 7.3% from 18 to 24, 27.9% from 25 to 44, 26.0% from 45 to 64, and 13.6% who were 65 years of age or older. The median age was 39 years. For every 100 females, there were 98.9 males. For every 100 females age 18 and over, there were 95.6 males.

The median income for a household in the borough was $57,326, and the median income for a family was $63,864. Males had a median income of $43,182 versus $30,807 for females. The per capita income for the borough was $26,035. About 2.4% of families and 4.2% of the population were below the poverty line, including 4.3% of those under age 18 and none of those age 65 or over.

== Government ==
=== Local government ===
Gibbsboro is governed under the borough form of New Jersey municipal government, the state's most common form of government, which is used by 218 municipalities (of the 564) statewide. The governing body is comprised of a mayor and a borough council, with all positions elected at-large on a partisan basis as part of the November general election. A mayor is elected directly by the voters to a four-year term of office. The borough council includes six members elected to serve three-year terms on a staggered basis, with two seats coming up for election each year in a three-year cycle. The borough form of government used by Gibbsboro is a "weak mayor / strong council" government in which council members act as the legislative body with the mayor presiding at meetings and voting only in the event of a tie. The mayor can veto ordinances subject to an override by a two-thirds majority vote of the council. The mayor makes committee and liaison assignments for council members, and most appointments are made by the mayor with the advice and consent of the council.

As of 2024, the mayor of Gibbsboro is Independent Edward G. Campbell III, whose term of office ends December 31, 2027. Members of the Gibbsboro Borough Council are Mitch Brown (I, 2025), Fred Deterding (I, 2026), Christine Karsch (I, 2026), Michael F. MacFerren (I, 2024), Ronald Rickert Jr. (I, 2025) and Glenn N. Werner (I, 2024).

=== Federal, state and county representation ===
Gibbsboro is located in the 1st Congressional District and is part of New Jersey's 6th state legislative district.

For the 119th United States Congress, New Jersey's 1st congressional district is represented by Donald Norcross (D, Camden). New Jersey is represented in the United States Senate by Democrats Cory Booker (Newark, term ends 2027) and Andy Kim (Moorestown, term ends 2031).

For the 2026–2027 session, the 6th legislative district of the New Jersey Legislature is represented in the State Senate by James Beach (D, Voorhees Township) and in the General Assembly by Louis Greenwald (D, Voorhees Township) and Melinda Kane (D, Cherry Hill).

Camden County is governed by a Board of County Commissioners composed of seven members chosen at-large in partisan elections for three-year terms on a staggered basis by the residents of the county, with either two or three seats up for election each year as part of the November general election. At a reorganization meeting held in January after each election, the newly constituted Board of Commissioners selects one member to serve as Director and another as Deputy Director, each serving a one-year term in that role. As of 2025, Camden County's Commissioners are: Commissioner Director Louis Cappelli Jr. (D, Collingswood, 2026), Commissioner Deputy Director Edward T. McDonnell (D, Pennsauken Township, 2025), Virginia Ruiz Betteridge (D, Runnemede, 2025), Almar Dyer (D, Pennsauken Township, 2027), Melinda Kane (D, Cherry Hill, 2027), Jeffrey L. Nash (D, Winslow Township, 2027), and Jonathan L. Young Sr. (D, Berlin Township, 2026).

Camden County's constitutional officers are: Clerk Pamela Rosen Lampitt (D, Cherry Hill, 2029) Sheriff Chuck Billingham (D, Gloucester City, 2027) and Surrogate Michelle Gentek-Mayer (D, Gloucester Township, 2025).

=== Politics ===
As of March 2011, there were a total of 1,678 registered voters in Gibbsboro, of which 651 (38.8%) were registered as Democrats, 347 (20.7%) were registered as Republicans and 680 (40.5%) were registered as Unaffiliated. There were no voters registered to other parties.

Gubernatorial election results for Gibbsboro
| Year | Republican | | Democratic | | Third party(ies) | |
| Year | No. | % | No. | % | No. | % |
|---|---|---|---|---|---|---|
| 2025 | 433 | 40.35% | 634 | 59.09% | 6 | 0.56% |
| 2021 | 401 | 47.68% | 433 | 51.49% | 7 | 0.83% |
| 2017 | 292 | 43.65% | 359 | 53.66% | 18 | 2.69% |
| 2013 | 458 | 64.78% | 241 | 34.09% | 8 | 1.13% |
| 2009 | 404 | 47.92% | 367 | 43.53% | 72 | 8.54% |
| 2005 | 346 | 43.09% | 415 | 51.68% | 42 | 5.23% |

In the 2012 presidential election, Democrat Barack Obama received 57.2% of the vote (705 cast), ahead of Republican Mitt Romney with 41.9% (517 votes), and other candidates with 0.9% (11 votes), among the 1,236 ballots cast by the borough's 1,767 registered voters (3 ballots were spoiled), for a turnout of 69.9%. In the 2008 presidential election, Democrat Barack Obama received 54.6% of the vote (721 cast), ahead of Republican John McCain, who received around 42.6% (562 votes), with 1,320 ballots cast among the borough's 1,713 registered voters, for a turnout of 77.1%. In the 2004 presidential election, Democrat John Kerry received 52.9% of the vote (702 ballots cast), outpolling Republican George W. Bush, who received around 45.3% (601 votes), with 1,326 ballots cast among the borough's 1,694 registered voters, for a turnout percentage of 78.3.

United States presidential election results for Gibbsboro
| Year | Republican | | Democratic | | Third party(ies) | |
| Year | No. | % | No. | % | No. | % |
|---|---|---|---|---|---|---|
| 2024 | 570 | 44.02% | 695 | 53.67% | 30 | 2.32% |
| 2020 | 601 | 42.68% | 787 | 55.89% | 20 | 1.42% |
| 2016 | 572 | 46.09% | 611 | 49.23% | 58 | 4.67% |
| 2012 | 517 | 41.93% | 705 | 57.18% | 11 | 0.89% |
| 2008 | 562 | 42.58% | 721 | 54.62% | 37 | 2.80% |
| 2004 | 601 | 45.32% | 702 | 52.94% | 23 | 1.73% |

In the 2013 gubernatorial election, Republican Chris Christie received 64.8% of the vote (458 cast), ahead of Democrat Barbara Buono with 34.1% (241 votes), and other candidates with 1.1% (8 votes), among the 719 ballots cast by the borough's 1,749 registered voters (12 ballots were spoiled), for a turnout of 41.1%. In the 2009 gubernatorial election, Republican Chris Christie received 47.9% of the vote (404 ballots cast), ahead of both Democrat Jon Corzine with 43.5% (367 votes) and Independent Chris Daggett with 6.4% (54 votes), with 843 ballots cast among the borough's 1,707 registered voters, yielding a 49.4% turnout.

United States Senate election results for Gibbsboro1
| Year | Republican | | Democratic | | Third party(ies) | |
| Year | No. | % | No. | % | No. | % |
|---|---|---|---|---|---|---|
| 2024 | 509 | 40.24% | 740 | 58.50% | 16 | 1.26% |
| 2018 | 489 | 49.05% | 467 | 46.84% | 41 | 4.11% |
| 2012 | 457 | 39.74% | 670 | 58.26% | 23 | 2.00% |
| 2006 | 358 | 44.81% | 414 | 51.81% | 27 | 3.38% |

United States Senate election results for Gibbsboro2
| Year | Republican | | Democratic | | Third party(ies) | |
| Year | No. | % | No. | % | No. | % |
|---|---|---|---|---|---|---|
| 2020 | 588 | 43.01% | 766 | 56.04% | 13 | 0.95% |
| 2014 | 283 | 45.06% | 330 | 52.55% | 15 | 2.39% |
| 2013 | 180 | 46.39% | 206 | 53.09% | 2 | 0.52% |
| 2008 | 559 | 46.39% | 635 | 52.70% | 11 | 0.91% |

== Education ==
The Gibbsboro School District serves public school students in pre-kindergarten through eighth grade at Gibbsboro Public School. As of the 2023–24 school year, the district, comprised of one school, had an enrollment of 280 students and 34.0 classroom teachers (on an FTE basis), for a student–teacher ratio of 8.2:1.

Public school students in ninth through twelfth grades attend Eastern Regional High School, part of the Eastern Camden County Regional High School District, a limited-purpose, public regional school district that also serves students from the constituent communities of Berlin Borough and Voorhees Township. As of the 2023–24 school year, the high school had an enrollment of 1,898 students and 144.8 classroom teachers (on an FTE basis), for a student–teacher ratio of 13.1:1. The district's board of education is comprised of nine members who set policy and oversee the fiscal and educational operation of the district through its administration. Representation on the board of education is determined by the population of each of the three sending districts, with one seat allocated to Gibbsboro.

== Transportation ==
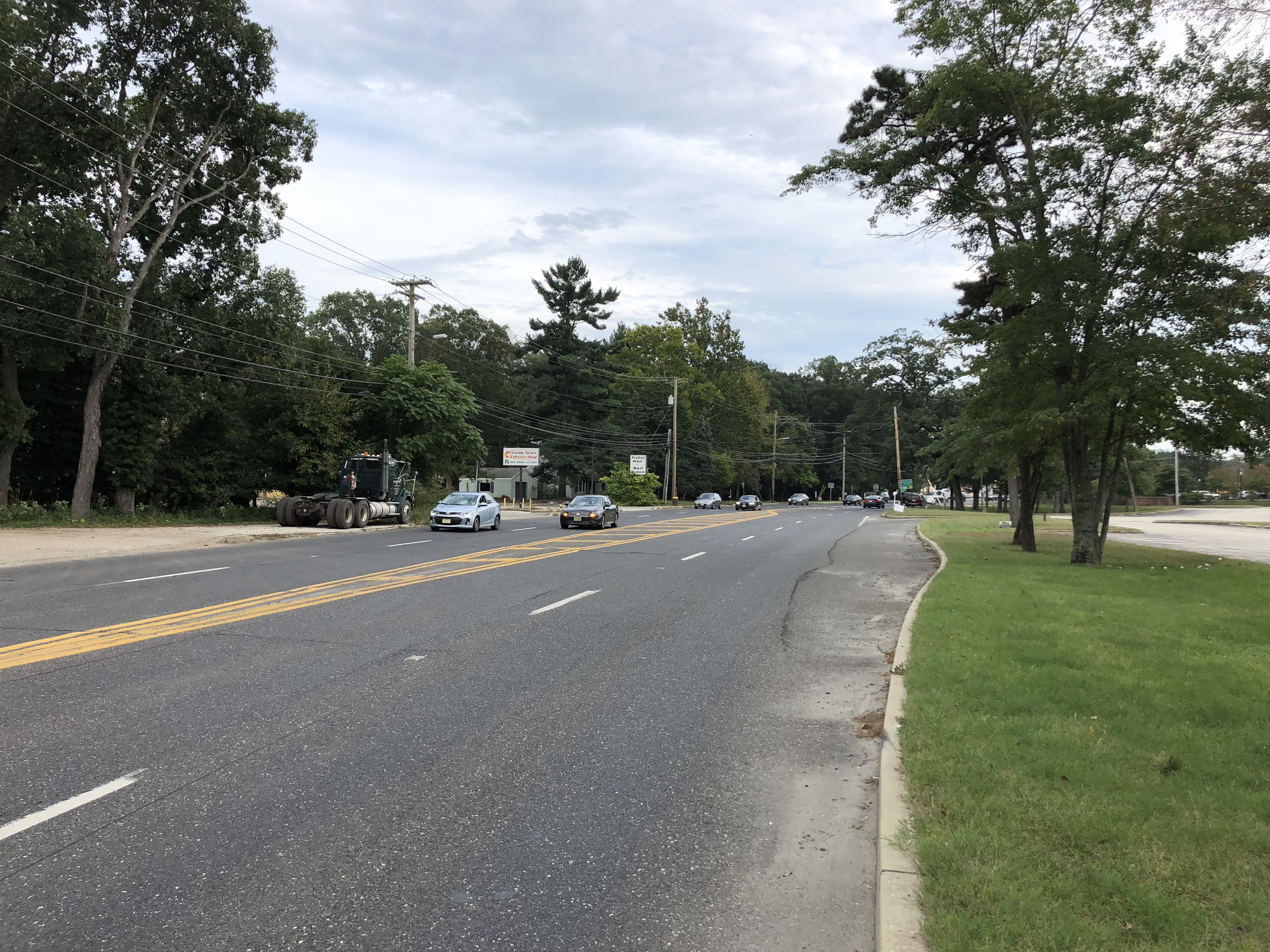
County Route 561 in Gibbsboro

As of May 2010, the borough had a total of 17.36 miles (27.94 km) of roadways, of which 9.63 miles (15.50 km) were maintained by the municipality and 7.73 miles (12.44 km) by Camden County.

No Interstate, U.S. or state highways traverse Gibbsboro. The main roadway serving the borough is County Route 561.

== Notable people ==
People who were born in, residents of, or otherwise closely associated with Gibbsboro include:

- Zac Gallen (born 1995), pitcher for the Arizona Diamondbacks
