= Voorhees Town Center =

Defunct mall in Camden County, New Jersey, U.S.

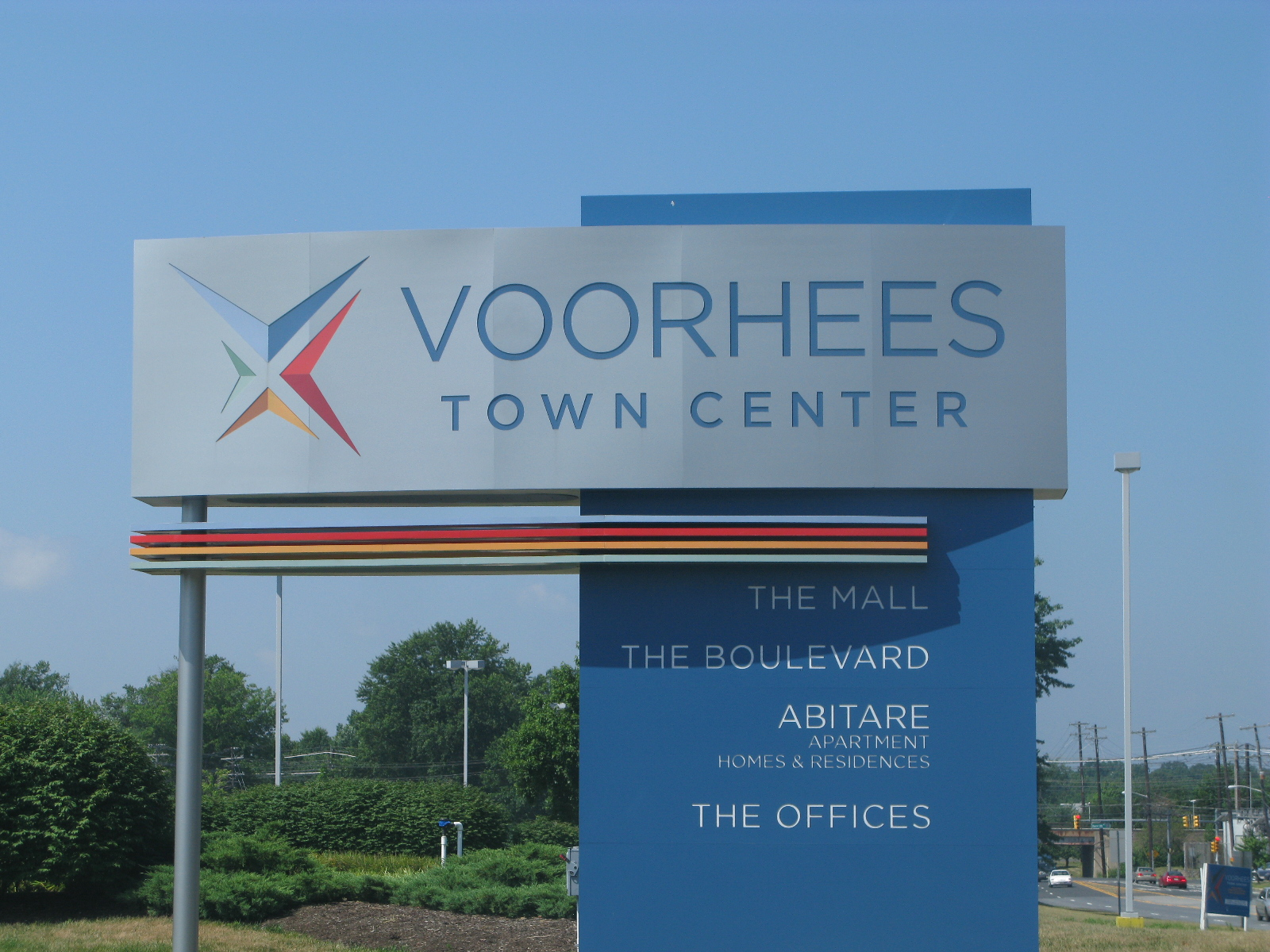
- Location: Voorhees Township, New Jersey, U.S.
- Coordinates: 39.8500°N 75.0023°W
- Opened: 1970; 56 years ago (as Echelon Mall); 2008; 18 years ago (as Voorhees Town Center)
- Closed: April 2024 (interior mall)
- Developer: The Rouse Company
- Manager: Mason Asset Management
- Owner: Namdar Realty Group
- Num. of stores: 25+
- Num. of anchor tenants: 2
- Floor area: 664,380 sq ft (61,723 m^{2})
- Floors: 2
- Parking: Parking lot
- Public transit: NJ Transit bus: 451, 459
- Website: www.voorheestowncenter.com

Voorhees Town Center (formerly Echelon Mall) is a defunct regional mall and a residential area located in Voorhees Township, New Jersey. It opened in 1970 and named after Echelon Airfield which was located where the mall stands today. The Echelon Mall was renamed Voorhees Town Center in 2007. Boscov's is currently the only anchor of the mall. By March 2026, the food court and all interior retail spaces in the former Echelon Mall remained closed indefinetely following a fire that occurred on April 19, 2024.

== Property history ==
The site on which the Echelon Mall was built began as an airfield; nearly 200 acres (0.81 km^{2}) of farmland bought by flying enthusiasts Rogers and Jeannette Smith in 1939. The Echelon Airfield was incorporated in 1944 and went on to house 20 planes, and included three grass runways, a gift shop, a small café, and a hangar capable of housing six planes. The airfield was mostly used for recreational flying, flying lessons, and a take-off point for crop dusters and charter flights.

In 1950, Rogers Smith died in an airplane accident. His wife leased the airfield to Hugh and Kay Hamill, who operated it until she sold the property in 1962. The new owners renamed the field Delaware Valley Airpark, and ran it for three more years, until it closed in 1965. In 1969, groundbreaking occurred to construct the Echelon Mall, which was the centerpiece of a 470-acre (190 ha) planned community named "Echelon" consisting of apartments, condominiums, single-family homes, office space, and civic space that included a YMCA, and the new Camden County Library. Developed by Echelon Mall, Inc., a subsidiary of The Rouse Company, at the cost of $80 million, the mall opened in 1970 as part of a vision for "a new kind of downtown" located in suburbia.

== Mall history ==
Old Echelon Mall signage along Somerdale Road

Until redevelopment began in January 2007, the Echelon Mall had a gross leasable area of 1,127,308 sq ft (104,730.3 m^{2}). This made it the second-largest mall in southern New Jersey after the Cherry Hill Mall. Echelon was developed in 1970 at the center of a residential and commercial center in Voorhees. The food court opened in November 1985 with over a dozen vendors offering a variety of cuisines. In October 1992, the Echelon Mall opened a family entertainment center called Exhilarama, which was owned and operated by Edison Brothers Stores. Exhilarama was a popular indoor amusement center throughout the mid-1990s until it closed in 1996. Adjacent to the Exhilarama center was a General Cinema movie theater, which also closed a few years later. The building was demolished and the land was used to provide parking for the mall.

=== Decline ===
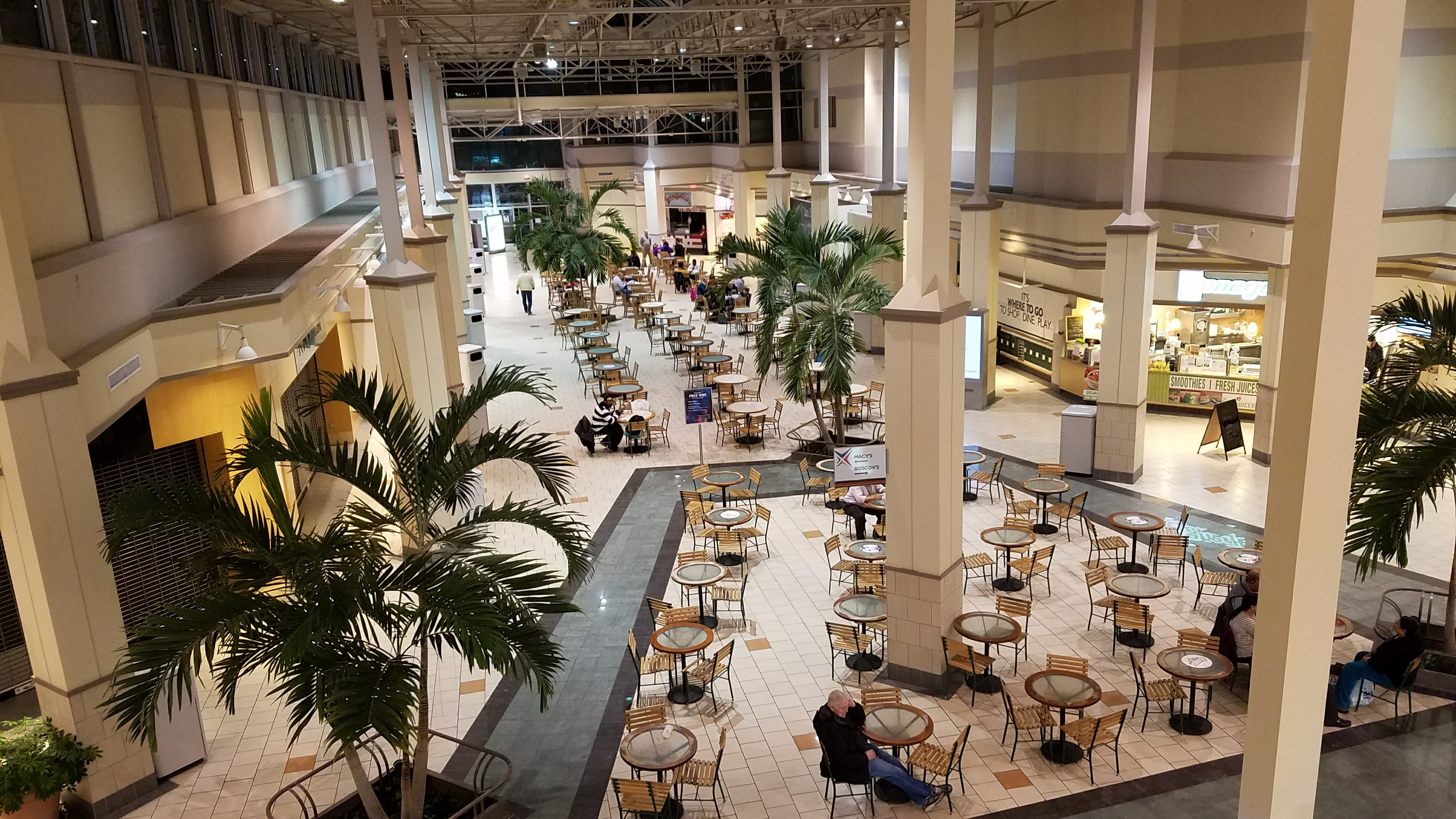
Food court inside the mall in 2017

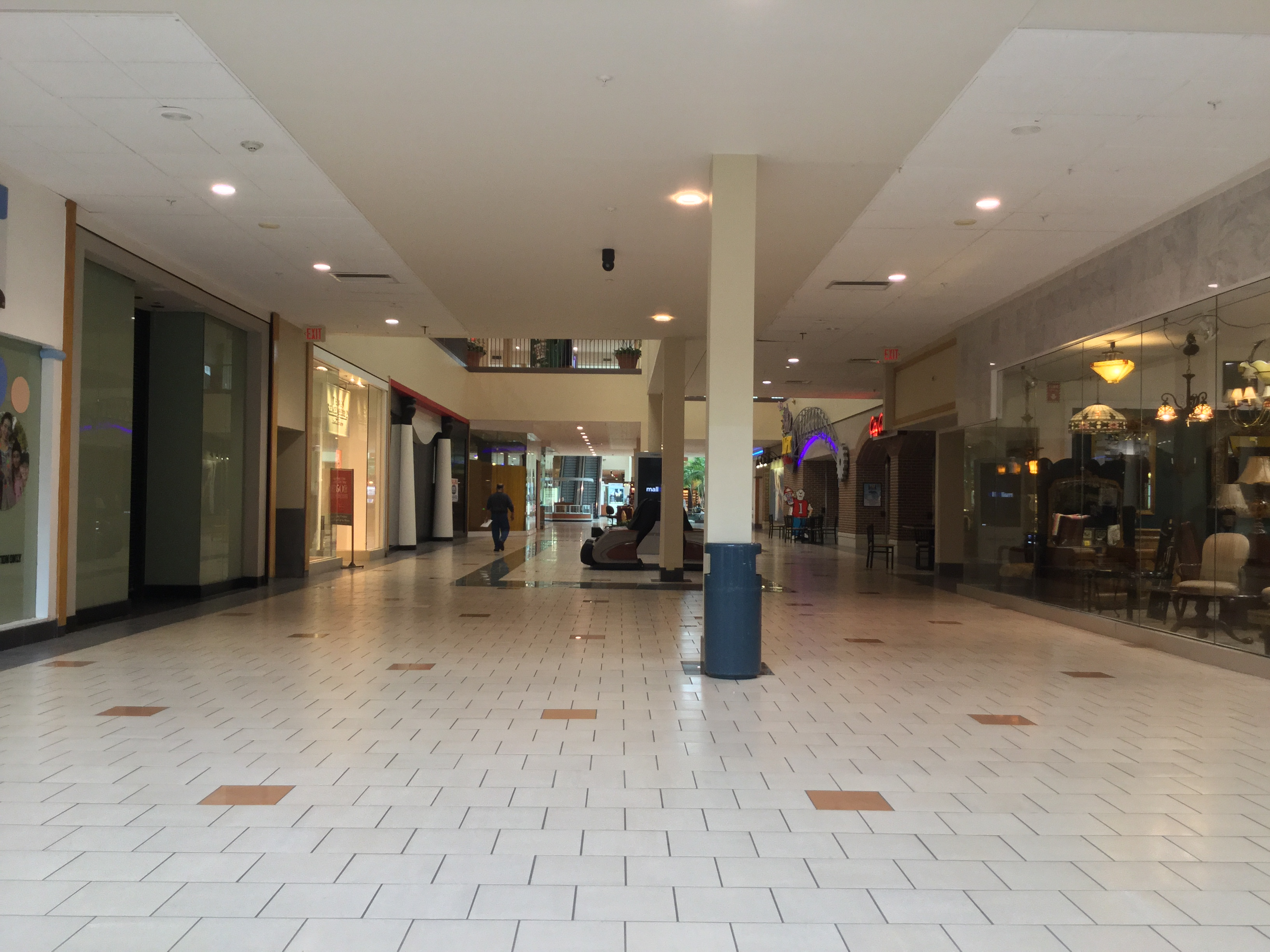
Lower level looking from Boscov's towards the food court

Echelon was a popular mall up until around 2000, when the mall began to struggle, and by 2005, the vacancy rate was nearly 75%. Echelon had several problems that contributed to its high vacancy rate, including over expansion. It had four anchors which included Sears, built in 1998 but closed three years later. The remainder of the mall lacked renovations. JCPenney exited shortly after Sears, with the national chains gradually following suit. Much of the upper level is vacant, most noticeably in the section near the former Strawbridge's.

Numerous other malls are located nearby, including Cherry Hill Mall, and moderately-sized malls in Moorestown and Deptford. While Echelon competed with these centers for years, the advent of newer centers such as The Promenade at Sagemore in Marlton, and a significant renovation of the Deptford Mall, with the addition of a JCPenney, have provided more attractive shopping alternatives in the area. Also, whereas most U.S. shopping malls are located near an Interstate highway or at least a principal thoroughfare, Echelon is located at the intersection of Somerdale and Burnt Mill Roads in Voorhees.

In August 2021, Brooklyn Pizza, formerly Lorenzo's Pizza and Scotto's Pizza, was the final eatery to close inside the mall. The food court remained vacant until Eephee's Kitchen, a local Nigerian restaurant, opened in the former Burger King in October of the same year. Also in August, LensCrafters moved to The Promenade at Sagemore. It had been operating in the mall since the early 1980s.

As of 2023, the only national retailer operating inside the mall, aside from the Boscov's department store, is Bath & Body Works.

In April 2024, a two-alarm fire broke out in the food court, which spread to the second floor and roof.

== First redevelopment plans ==
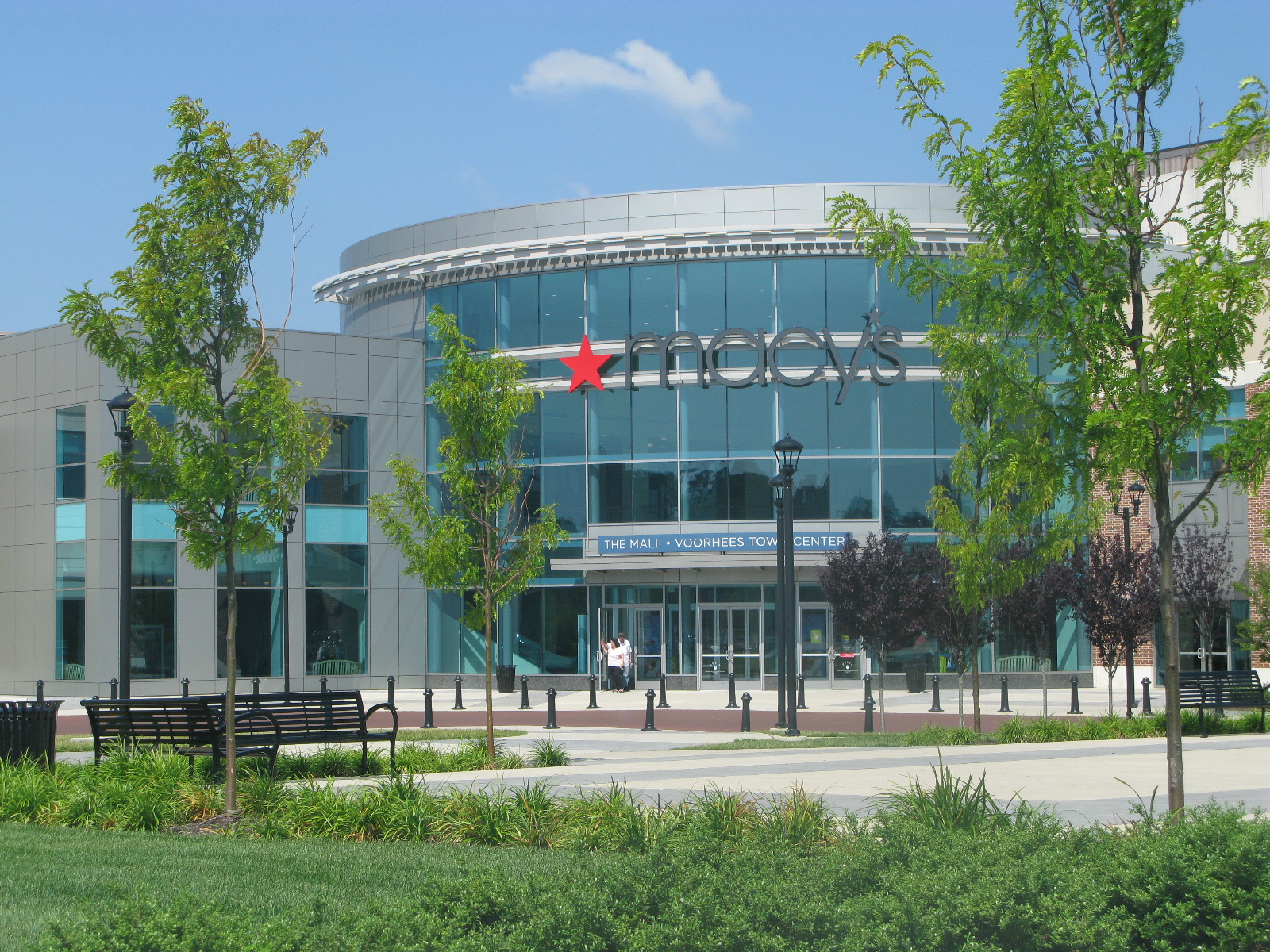
Former Macy's sign at one of the mall's entrances

After its proposal for a Walmart store was rejected by residents, PREIT submitted plans to demolish the abandoned anchor stores and adjacent mall space to make way for a mixed-use "town center" featuring a 65,000-square-foot (6,000 m^{2}) supermarket and 130,000 square feet (12,000 m^{2}) of retail stores along a landscaped boulevard. PREIT renovated the downsized mall to house 253,000 square feet (23,500 m^{2}) of small specialty shops along with anchor stores Macy's and Boscov's.

The mall was officially renamed as Voorhees Town Center. The groundbreaking ceremony for the redevelopment project was on January 30, 2007. The former Sears and JCPenney buildings, and the mall corridor between Macy's and the former JCPenney were demolished.

In December 2007, work was completed on the mall portion of the town center. Condos and new office complexes were also built around the same time. In spring 2008, the Voorhees Town Center held its grand opening. In May 2011, the Voorhees Township municipal offices also relocated to the town center. According to PREIT, the Voorhees Town Center is only the third mall in the United States to be anchored by municipal offices.

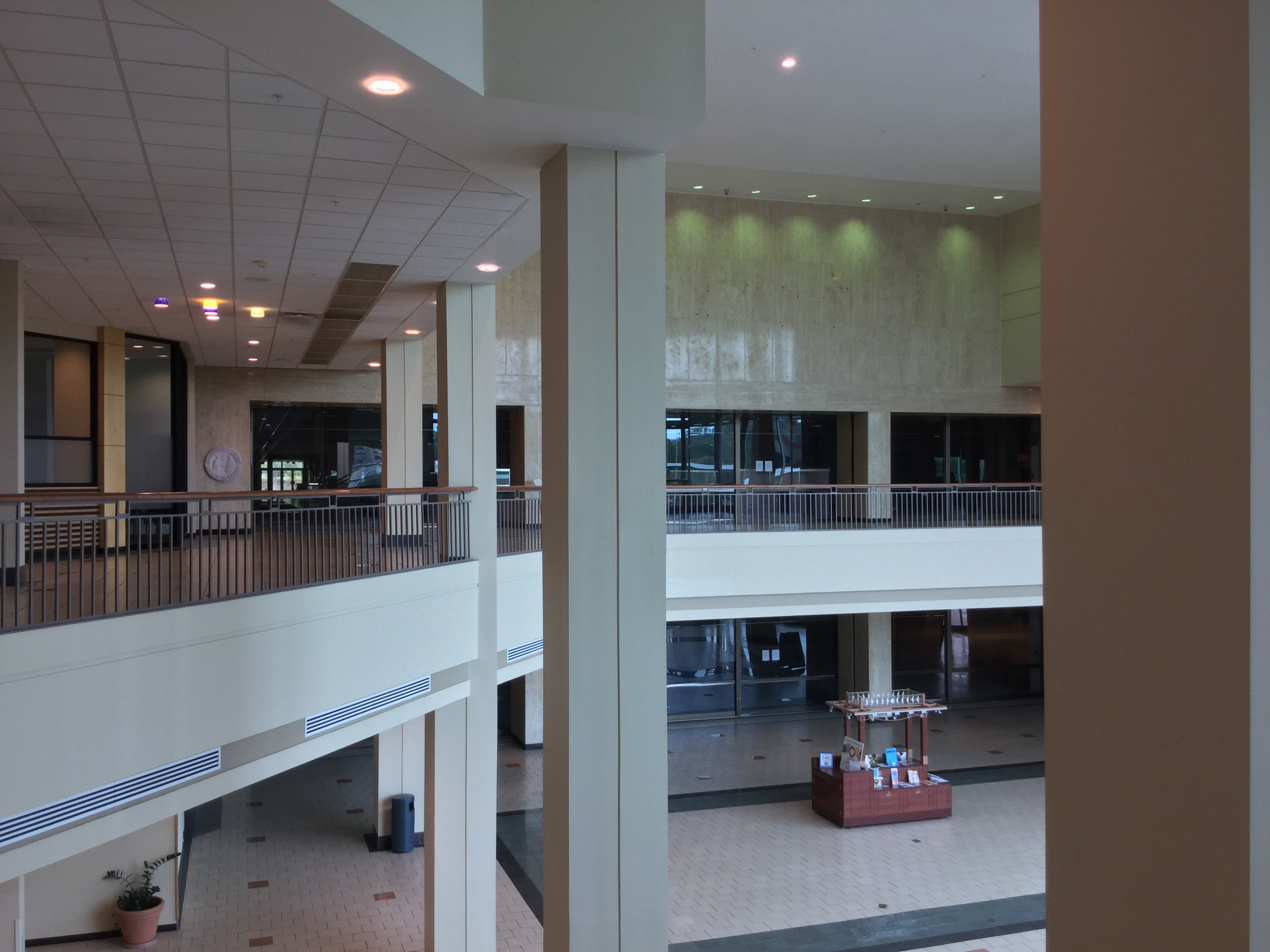
Former Macy's storefront in May 2017, a couple of months after Macy's shuttered their store

== Future redevelopment ==
In October 2015, PREIT sold the Voorhees Town Center for $13.4 million to Namdar Realty Group after Macy's announced the closure of 36 unspecified stores. However, when Macy's later released a statement announcing the stores to be closed, Voorhees Town Center was not mentioned.

On January 4, 2017, it was announced that Macy's would be closing in spring 2017 as part of a plan to close 68 stores nationwide which left Boscov's as the only remaining anchor.

Throughout 2017 and 2018, many national merchants left the struggling mall. At the time, the vacancy rate at the mall was 40 percent.

In March 2018, Voorhees Township officials moved forward with a plan that declared the mall a "redevelopment area" proposing that parts of the mall face eminent domain. The plan called for the township acquiring most of the mall and the shuttered Macy's anchor store for redevelopment.

By June 2018, the town began accepting offers from potential redevelopers to prevent an eminent domain situation. Some of the proposed ideas included "adding microbreweries and making it more like an Xfinity Live-type atmosphere or like a Dave & Buster's."

By September 2018, township officials had selected Brandywine Financial Services Corp. to "transform the largely vacant mall into a mixed-use center with housing and entertainment attractions." Township officials indicated that some parts of the mall may be razed during the redevelopment.

By January 2019, plans began to solidify further, which "includes beer courts instead of food courts, laser tag, sports bars and outdoor movie nights when weather permits." Also included in the plan are more town homes and apartments that could be built in and around the former Macy's.

Citing the uncertainties of the COVID-19 pandemic, Brandywine terminated its sales agreement with Namdar in April 2020.

In November 2023, Modax Furniture Outlet opened in the former Macy's.

In October 2025, plans were announced by Voorhees Township officials for a redevelopment plan at the Voorhees Town Center mall portion of the property, including over 300 townhouses, as well as more than 38,000 square feet of new commercial and entertainment space. Boscov's will remain as is.

In November 2026, those redevelopment plans collapsed. The developer, Hoboken Brownstone Co., "said the company could not move forward without a $90 million state tax credit that it had counted on to close its financing gap." This refers to the New Jersey Economic Development Authority pausing new applications for Aspire tax credits in July. (Note: The pause was announced on July 23, 2026 as part of "an effort to balance fiscal responsibility and the Sherrill administration’s focus on affordability[.]" See "Aspire Program [archived]". NJEDA.) Township leaders rejected options to make the project financially viable without tax credits via greater residential density, fearing "strain on schools and infrastructure."
