= Laurel Springs, New Jersey =

Borough in Camden County, New Jersey, US

- Borough
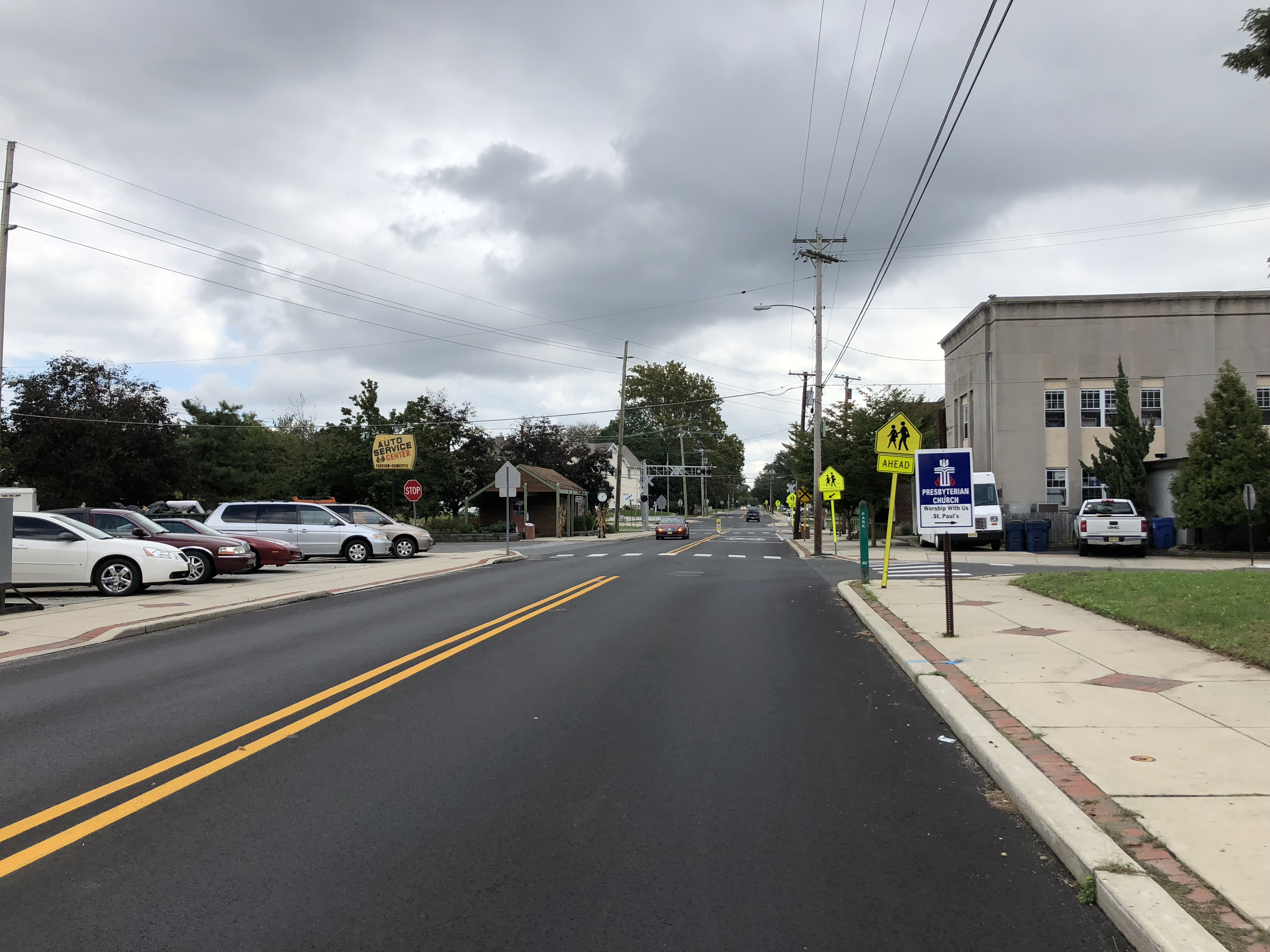
- Downtown area of Laurel Springs

- Seal

- Laurel Springs highlighted in Camden County. Inset: Location of Camden County in the State of New Jersey.

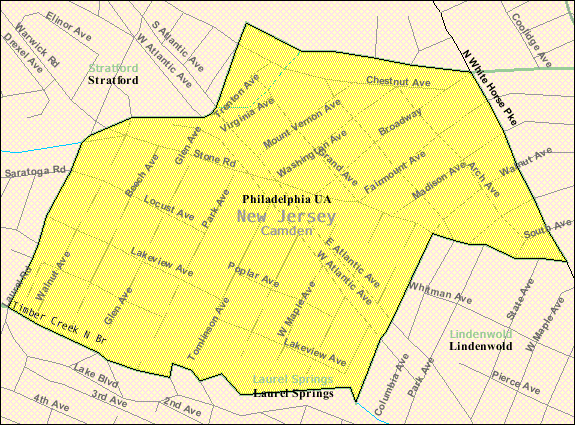
- Census Bureau map of Laurel Springs, New Jersey

- Location in Camden County Location in New Jersey Location in the United States
- Coordinates: 39.820543°N 75.005445°W
- Country: United States
- State: New Jersey
- County: Camden
- Incorporated: April 2, 1913

Government
  - Type: Borough
  - Body: Borough Council
  - Mayor: Thomas A. Barbera (D, term ends December 31, 2023)
  - Administrator: Kenneth J. Cheeseman
  - Municipal clerk: Dawn T. Amadio

Area
  - Total: 0.46 sq mi (1.19 km^{2})
  - Land: 0.45 sq mi (1.17 km^{2})
  - Water: 0.0077 sq mi (0.02 km^{2}) 2.17%
  - Rank: 549th of 565 in state 33rd of 37 in county
- Elevation: 85 ft (26 m)

Population (2020)
  - Total: 1,978
  - Estimate (2023): 1,984
  - Rank: 485th of 565 in state 31st of 37 in county
  - Density: 4,381.5/sq mi (1,691.7/km^{2})
  - Rank: 141st of 565 in state 17th of 37 in county
- Time zone: UTC−05:00 (Eastern (EST))
  - Summer (DST): UTC−04:00 (Eastern (EDT))
- ZIP Code: 08021 – Clementon
- Area code: 609 and 856
- FIPS code: 3400739210
- GNIS feature ID: 0885272
- Website: www.laurelsprings-nj.com

Laurel Springs is a borough in Camden County, in the U.S. state of New Jersey. As of the 2020 United States census, the borough's population was 1,978, an increase of 70 (+3.7%) from the 2010 census count of 1,908, which in turn reflected a decline of 62 (−3.1%) from the 1,970 counted in the 2000 census.

Laurel Springs was incorporated as a borough by an act of the New Jersey Legislature on April 2, 1913, from portions of Clementon Township, based on the results of a referendum held on May 1, 1913. The borough was named for its therapeutic springs situated in laurel groves.

In 2021, the borough had the 11th-highest property tax rate in New Jersey, with an equalized rate of 4.803% in 2020, compared to 3.470% in the county as a whole and a statewide average of 2.279%.

== Geography ==
According to the United States Census Bureau, the borough had a total area of 0.46 square miles (1.19 km^{2}), including 0.45 square miles (1.17 km^{2}) of land and 0.01 square miles (0.02 km^{2}) of water (2.17%).

Unincorporated communities, localities and place names located partially or completely within the township include Watsontown.

Laurel Springs borders the Camden County municipalities of Lindenwold and Stratford.

== Demographics ==
Historical population
Census	Pop.	Note	%±
1920	911		—
1930	1,343		47.4%
1940	1,344		0.1%
1950	1,540		14.6%
1960	2,028		31.7%
1970	2,566		26.5%
1980	2,249		−12.4%
1990	2,341		4.1%
2000	1,970		−15.8%
2010	1,908		−3.1%
2020	1,978		3.7%
2023 (est.)	1,984	▲	0.3%
Population sources: 1920 1920–2000 1920–1930; 1940–2000 2000; 2010 2020

=== 2010 census ===
The 2010 United States census counted 1,908 people, 727 households, and 506 families in the borough. The population density was 4,163.7 per square mile (1,607.6/km^{2}). There were 771 housing units at an average density of 1,682.5 per square mile (649.6/km^{2}). The racial makeup was 92.87% (1,772) White, 3.46% (66) Black or African American, 0.10% (2) Native American, 1.00% (19) Asian, 0.00% (0) Pacific Islander, 1.31% (25) from other races, and 1.26% (24) from two or more races. Hispanic or Latino of any race were 3.88% (74) of the population.

Of the 727 households, 29.6% had children under the age of 18; 51.3% were married couples living together; 12.2% had a female householder with no husband present and 30.4% were non-families. Of all households, 25.7% were made up of individuals and 8.8% had someone living alone who was 65 years of age or older. The average household size was 2.62 and the average family size was 3.15.

22.8% of the population were under the age of 18, 9.6% from 18 to 24, 27.0% from 25 to 44, 28.5% from 45 to 64, and 12.1% who were 65 years of age or older. The median age was 39.5 years. For every 100 females, the population had 95.9 males. For every 100 females ages 18 and older there were 94.1 males.

The Census Bureau's 2006–2010 American Community Survey showed that (in 2010 inflation-adjusted dollars) median household income was $69,405 (with a margin of error of +/− $8,221) and the median family income was $83,750 (+/− $12,497). Males had a median income of $57,900 (+/− $10,860) versus $49,028 (+/− $11,130) for females. The per capita income for the borough was $29,139 (+/− $3,021). About 11.4% of families and 11.2% of the population were below the poverty line, including 14.5% of those under age 18 and 3.8% of those age 65 or over.

=== 2000 census ===
As of the 2000 United States census there were 1,970 people, 762 households, and 534 families residing in the borough. The population density was 4,213.5 inhabitants per square mile (1,626.8/km^{2}). There were 806 housing units at an average density of 1,723.9 per square mile (665.6/km^{2}). The racial makeup of the borough was 94.37% White, 2.74% African American, 0.25% Native American, 0.96% Asian, 0.71% from other races, and 0.96% from two or more races. Hispanic or Latino of any race were 1.62% of the population.

There were 762 households, out of which 32.2% had children under the age of 18 living with them, 54.5% were married couples living together, 11.9% had a female householder with no husband present, and 29.9% were non-families. 26.1% of all households were made up of individuals, and 9.3% had someone living alone who was 65 years of age or older. The average household size was 2.59 and the average family size was 3.16.

In the borough the population was spread out, with 24.1% under the age of 18, 7.8% from 18 to 24, 31.0% from 25 to 44, 22.8% from 45 to 64, and 14.3% who were 65 years of age or older. The median age was 37 years. For every 100 females, there were 99.6 males. For every 100 females age 18 and over, there were 93.7 males.

The median income for a household in the borough was $52,500, and the median income for a family was $58,854. Males had a median income of $41,349 versus $30,893 for females. The per capita income for the borough was $23,254. About 1.9% of families and 3.7% of the population were below the poverty line, including 3.4% of those under age 18 and 1.4% of those age 65 or over.

== Government ==
=== Local government ===
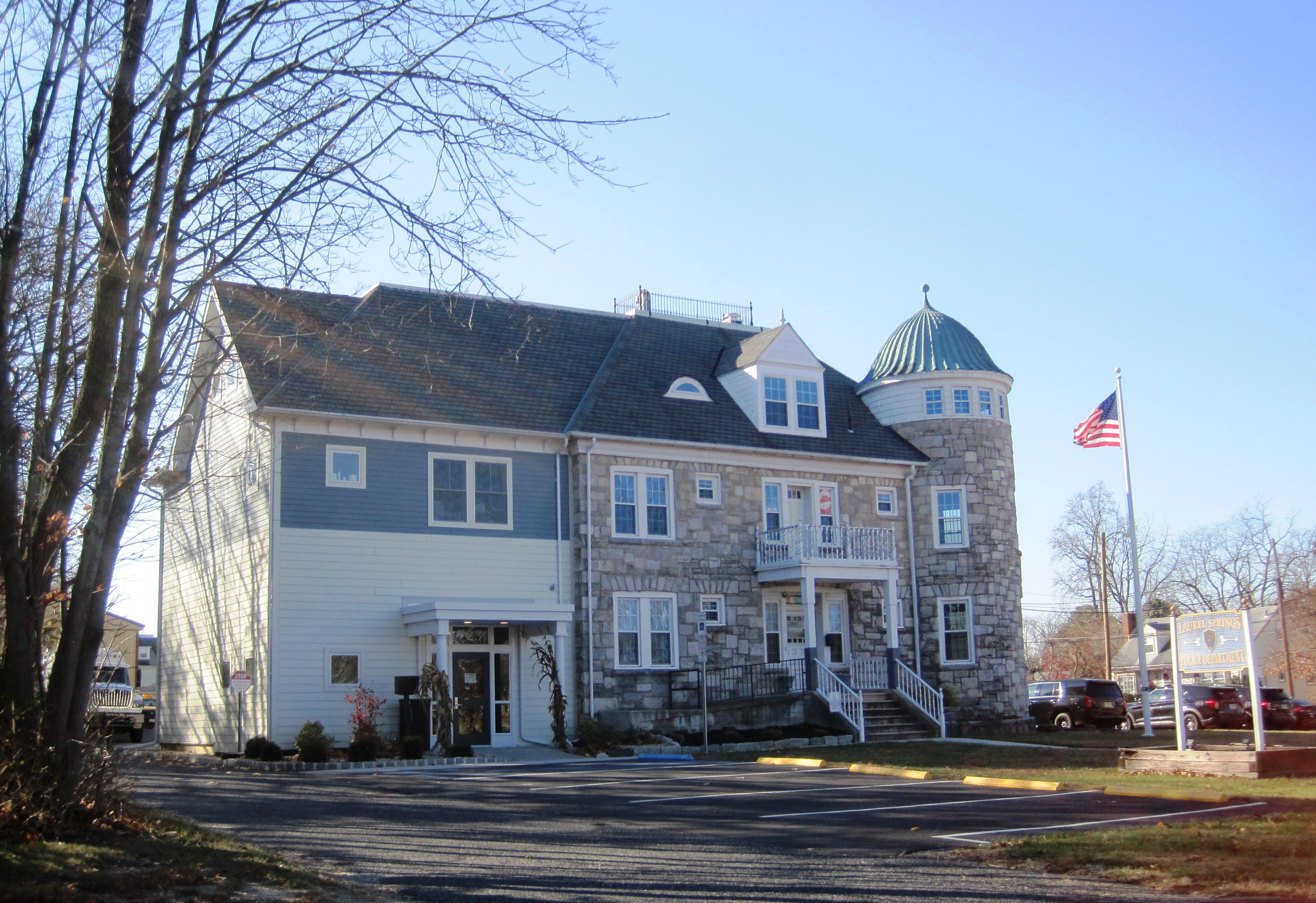
Laurel Springs municipal building and police station

Laurel Springs is governed under the borough form of New Jersey municipal government, which is used in 218 municipalities (of the 564) statewide, making it the most common form of government in New Jersey. The governing body is comprised of a mayor and a borough council, with all positions elected at-large on a partisan basis as part of the November general election. A mayor is elected directly by the voters to a four-year term of office. The borough council includes six members elected to serve three-year terms on a staggered basis, with two seats coming up for election each year in a three-year cycle. The borough form of government used by Laurel Springs is a "weak mayor / strong council" government in which council members act as the legislative body with the mayor presiding at meetings and voting only in the event of a tie. The mayor can veto ordinances subject to an override by a two-thirds majority vote of the council. The mayor makes committee and liaison assignments for council members, and most appointments are made by the mayor with the advice and consent of the council.

As of 2023, the mayor of Laurel Springs Borough is Democrat Thomas A. "Tom" Barbera, whose term of office ends December 31, 2023. Members of the Laurel Springs Borough Council are Council President James W. "Jim" Redstreake (R, 2024), Joseph Cruz (D, 2023), Samuel V. Del Pidio (R, 2023), Susan DiGregorio (D, 2024), Sarah Bolam DiMarco (D, 2025) and Marc A. Riondino (D, 2025).

=== Federal, state and county representation ===
Laurel Springs is located in the 1st Congressional District and is part of New Jersey's 6th state legislative district.

For the 119th United States Congress, New Jersey's 1st congressional district is represented by Donald Norcross (D, Camden). New Jersey is represented in the United States Senate by Democrats Cory Booker (Newark, term ends 2027) and Andy Kim (Moorestown, term ends 2031).

For the 2026–2027 session, the 6th legislative district of the New Jersey Legislature is represented in the State Senate by James Beach (D, Voorhees Township) and in the General Assembly by Louis Greenwald (D, Voorhees Township) and Melinda Kane (D, Cherry Hill).

Camden County is governed by a Board of County Commissioners composed of seven members chosen at-large in partisan elections for three-year terms on a staggered basis by the residents of the county, with either two or three seats up for election each year as part of the November general election. At a reorganization meeting held in January after each election, the newly constituted Board of Commissioners selects one member to serve as Director and another as Deputy Director, each serving a one-year term in that role. As of 2025, Camden County's Commissioners are: Commissioner Director Louis Cappelli Jr. (D, Collingswood, 2026), Commissioner Deputy Director Edward T. McDonnell (D, Pennsauken Township, 2025), Virginia Ruiz Betteridge (D, Runnemede, 2025), Almar Dyer (D, Pennsauken Township, 2027), Melinda Kane (D, Cherry Hill, 2027), Jeffrey L. Nash (D, Winslow Township, 2027), and Jonathan L. Young Sr. (D, Berlin Township, 2026).

Camden County's constitutional officers are: Clerk Pamela Rosen Lampitt (D, Cherry Hill, 2029) Sheriff Chuck Billingham (D, Gloucester City, 2027) and Surrogate Michelle Gentek-Mayer (D, Gloucester Township, 2025).

=== Politics ===
As of March 2011, there were a total of 1,339 registered voters in Laurel Springs, of which 500 (37.3%) were registered as Democrats, 293 (21.9%) were registered as Republicans and 545 (40.7%) were registered as Unaffiliated. There was one voter registered to another party.

Gubernatorial election results for Laurel Springs
Year	Republican		Democratic		Third party(ies)	
Year	No.	%	No.	%	No.	%
2025	333	36.92%	562	62.31%	7	0.78%
2021	322	45.54%	379	53.61%	6	0.85%
2017	261	39.55%	377	57.12%	22	3.33%
2013	371	63.53%	202	34.59%	11	1.88%
2009	324	45.76%	308	43.50%	76	10.73%
2005	332	44.21%	388	51.66%	31	4.13%

In the 2012 presidential election, Democrat Barack Obama received 58.9% of the vote (558 cast), ahead of Republican Mitt Romney with 39.5% (374 votes), and other candidates with 1.6% (15 votes), among the 962 ballots cast by the borough's 1,422 registered voters (15 ballots were spoiled), for a turnout of 67.7%. In the 2008 presidential election, Democrat Barack Obama received 55.7% of the vote (583 cast), ahead of Republican John McCain, who received around 40.3% (422 votes), with 1,047 ballots cast among the borough's 1,346 registered voters, for a turnout of 77.8%. In the 2004 presidential election, Democrat John Kerry received 55.6% of the vote (583 ballots cast), outpolling Republican George W. Bush, who received around 42.9% (450 votes), with 1,048 ballots cast among the borough's 1,328 registered voters, for a turnout percentage of 78.9.

United States presidential election results for Laurel Springs
Year	Republican		Democratic		Third party(ies)	
Year	No.	%	No.	%	No.	%
2024	484	42.38%	640	56.04%	18	1.58%
2020	469	39.02%	707	58.82%	26	2.16%
2016	407	42.31%	509	52.91%	46	4.78%
2012	374	39.49%	558	58.92%	15	1.58%
2008	422	40.31%	583	55.68%	42	4.01%
2004	450	42.94%	583	55.63%	15	1.43%

In the 2013 gubernatorial election, Republican Chris Christie received 63.5% of the vote (371 cast), ahead of Democrat Barbara Buono with 34.6% (202 votes), and other candidates with 1.9% (11 votes), among the 598 ballots cast by the borough's 1,438 registered voters (14 ballots were spoiled), for a turnout of 41.6%. In the 2009 gubernatorial election, Republican Chris Christie received 45.8% of the vote (324 ballots cast), ahead of both Democrat Jon Corzine with 43.5% (308 votes) and Independent Chris Daggett with 7.2% (51 votes), with 708 ballots cast among the borough's 1,368 registered voters, yielding a 51.8% turnout.

United States Senate election results for Laurel Springs1
Year	Republican		Democratic		Third party(ies)	
Year	No.	%	No.	%	No.	%
2024	423	37.87%	675	60.43%	19	1.70%
2018	351	41.25%	448	52.64%	52	6.11%
2012	362	39.82%	528	58.09%	19	2.09%
2006	311	44.11%	371	52.62%	23	3.26%

United States Senate election results for Laurel Springs2
Year	Republican		Democratic		Third party(ies)	
Year	No.	%	No.	%	No.	%
2020	482	41.20%	677	57.86%	11	0.94%
2014	216	41.94%	288	55.92%	11	2.14%
2013	152	46.06%	169	51.21%	9	2.73%
2008	428	44.12%	535	55.15%	7	0.72%

== Education ==
The Laurel Springs School District serves public school students in pre-kindergarten through sixth grade at Laurel Spring School. As of the 2021–22 school year, the district, comprised of one school, had an enrollment of 177 students and 15.4 classroom teachers (on an FTE basis), for a student–teacher ratio of 11.5:1.

For seventh and eighth grades, students from Laurel Springs attend Samuel S. Yellin Elementary School in Stratford as part of a sending/receiving relationship with the Stratford School District. As of the 2021–22 school year, Yellin School had an enrollment of 484 students and 41.5 classroom teachers (on an FTE basis), for a student–teacher ratio of 11.7:1.

For ninth grade through twelfth grade, public school students attend Sterling High School, a regional high school district that also serves students from Magnolia, Somerdale and Stratford, along with the sending districts of Hi-Nella and Laurel Springs. The high school is located in Somerdale. As of the 2021–22 school year, the high school had an enrollment of 897 students and 70.0 classroom teachers (on an FTE basis), for a student–teacher ratio of 12.8:1.

== Transportation ==
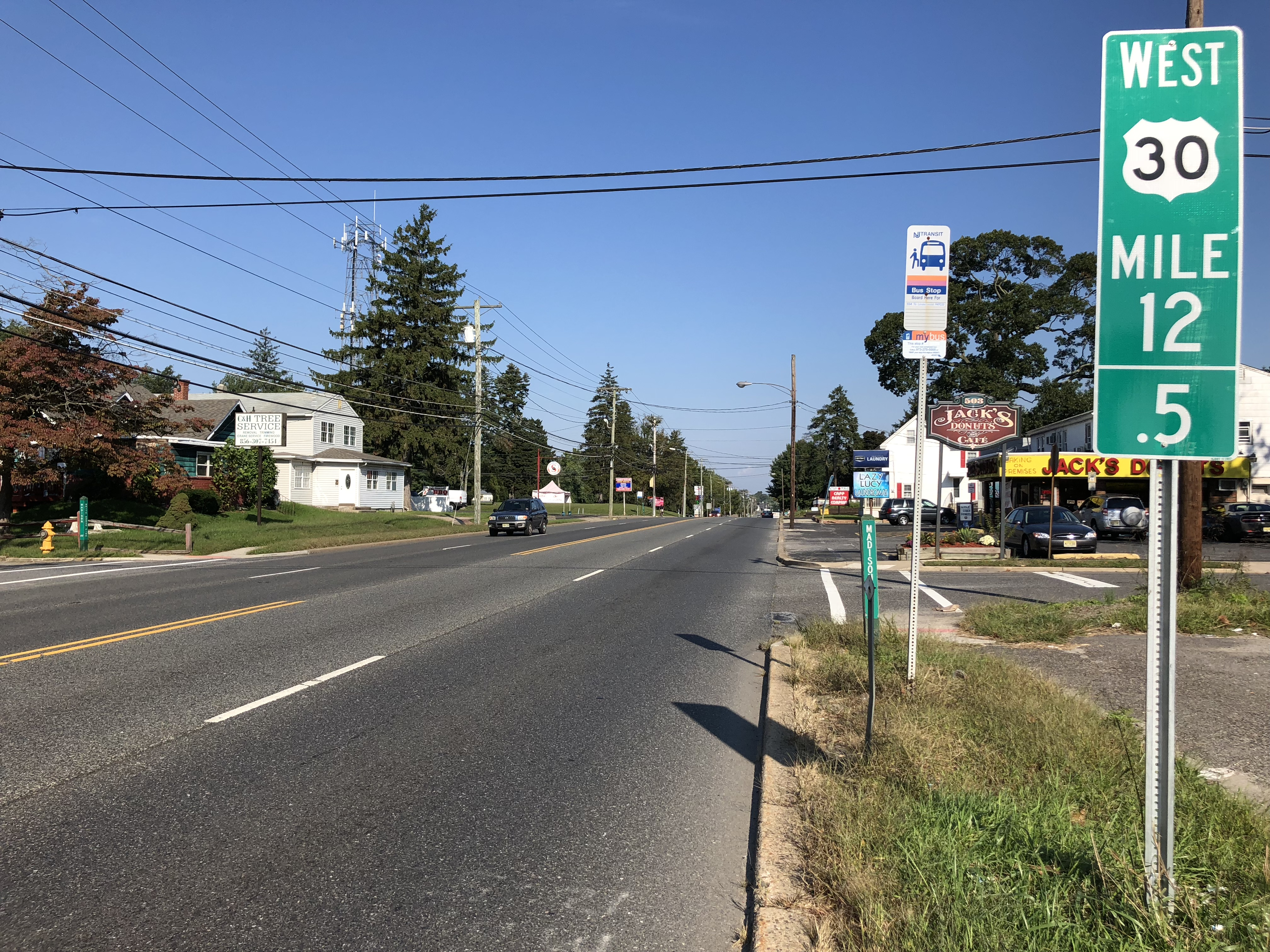
U.S. Route 30 westbound along the northeast edge of Laurel Springs

=== Roads and highways ===
As of May 2010, the borough had a total of 10.51 miles (16.91 km) of roadways, of which 8.52 miles (13.71 km) were maintained by the municipality, 1.78 miles (2.86 km) by Camden County and 0.21 miles (0.34 km) by the New Jersey Department of Transportation.

U.S. Route 30 is the main highway serving Laurel Springs. It runs along the northeast side of the borough, connecting it with Lindenwold and Stratford.

=== Public transportation ===
NJ Transit offers service between the borough and Atlantic City on the 554 route, with local bus service offered on the 451 and 459 routes.

== Notable people ==
People who were born in, residents of, or otherwise closely associated with Laurel Springs include:

- Daniel J. Dalton (born 1949), politician who served as New Jersey Senate Majority Leader and as Secretary of State of New Jersey
- Ray Narleski (1928–2012), relief pitcher in Major League Baseball who played with the Cleveland Indians (1954–1958) and Detroit Tigers (1959)
- Jacob Rupertus (1822/1823–1921), handgun designer and manufacturer
- William Burns Smith (1844–1917), politician who was the 74th Mayor of Philadelphia, serving from 1884 to 1887
- Walt Whitman (1819–1892), poet who made his summer home here
