= Thomas J. Shusted =

American politician (1926-2004)

Member of the New Jersey General Assembly from the 6th Legislative District
- In office January 10, 1978 – January 31, 1991 Serving with John A. Rocco
- Preceded by: Barbara Berman and Mary Keating Croce
- Succeeded by: Lee Solomon

Member of the Camden County Board of Chosen Freeholders
- In office 1972–1977

Member of the New Jersey State Assembly from the Legislative District 3D
- In office January 13, 1970 – March 9, 1971 Serving with James M. Turner
- Preceded by: Leonard H. Kaser and Walter E. Pedersen
- Succeeded by: Kenneth A. Gewertz and Francis J. Gorman

Personal details
- Born: August 3, 1926 Ocean City, New Jersey
- Died: March 31, 2004 (aged 77)
- Party: Republican
- Spouse: Mary McCrystle (m. 1954)
- Children: four sons and one daughter
- Education: La Salle University; Rutgers School of Law–Camden
- Occupation: Attorney

Thomas J. Shusted (August 3, 1926 – March 31, 2004) was an American attorney and politician who served in the New Jersey General Assembly on two separate occasions, representing Legislative District 3D from 1970 to 1972 and the 6th Legislative District from 1978 to 1991.

== Personal life ==
Born in Ocean City, New Jersey on August 3, 1926, Shusted attended Camden Catholic High School and served in the United States Army from 1944 to 1946. He did his undergraduate studies at La Salle University. After earning his law degree from Rutgers School of Law–Camden, he was admitted to the bar in 1954.

He had four sons and a daughter with his wife, the former Mary McCrystle, whom he married in 1954.

== Public service ==
Shusted was appointed as a municipal judge in the Borough of Laurel Springs three years after passing the bar. He was elected to the Camden County Board of Chosen Freeholders, serving from 1964 to 1969, the last two as Freeholder Director.

Shusted was elected in 1969 together with Republican running mate James M. Turner to serve in the New Jersey General Assembly to represent Legislative District 3B, one of four pairs of representatives from the 3rd Legislative District, which was further divided into four Assembly districts (Districts 3A, 3B, 3C, and 3D); District 3B included portions of both Camden County and Gloucester County.

Shusted was appointed in February 1971 by Assembly Speaker Barry T. Parker to fill the vacant seat that had been held by James T. Dowd as a member of the New Jersey State Commission of Investigation, an independent governmental fact-finding agency responsible for identifying and investigating organized crime, corruption and waste, fraud and abuse in government, and was the first county prosecutor to serve on a full-time basis in Camden County. In 1973, after a number of cases in which police were unable to get blood samples from suspected drunk drivers, county prosecutor Shusted advocated for legislation that would grant immunity to doctors to allow them to take blood from suspected drunk drivers involved in fatal accidents in response to requests from law enforcement officials as a means of determining the driver's blood alcohol content.

In the 1979 general election, Shusted and running mate John A. Rocco defeated incumbent Democrats Barbara Berman and Mary Keating Croce to win the two assembly seats in the New Jersey's 6th legislative district, which covered portions of Burlington County and Camden County. Rocco and Shusted were re-elected together to the Assembly in 1981, 1983, 1985, 1987 and 1989, when the 6th District only included portions of Camden County.

In September 1986, Governor Thomas Kean signed legislation that Shusted had sponsored which would double and triple fees assessed to drivers upon conviction for drunk driving. The additional funds would be used to administer programs for drunk drivers at the state and county levels.

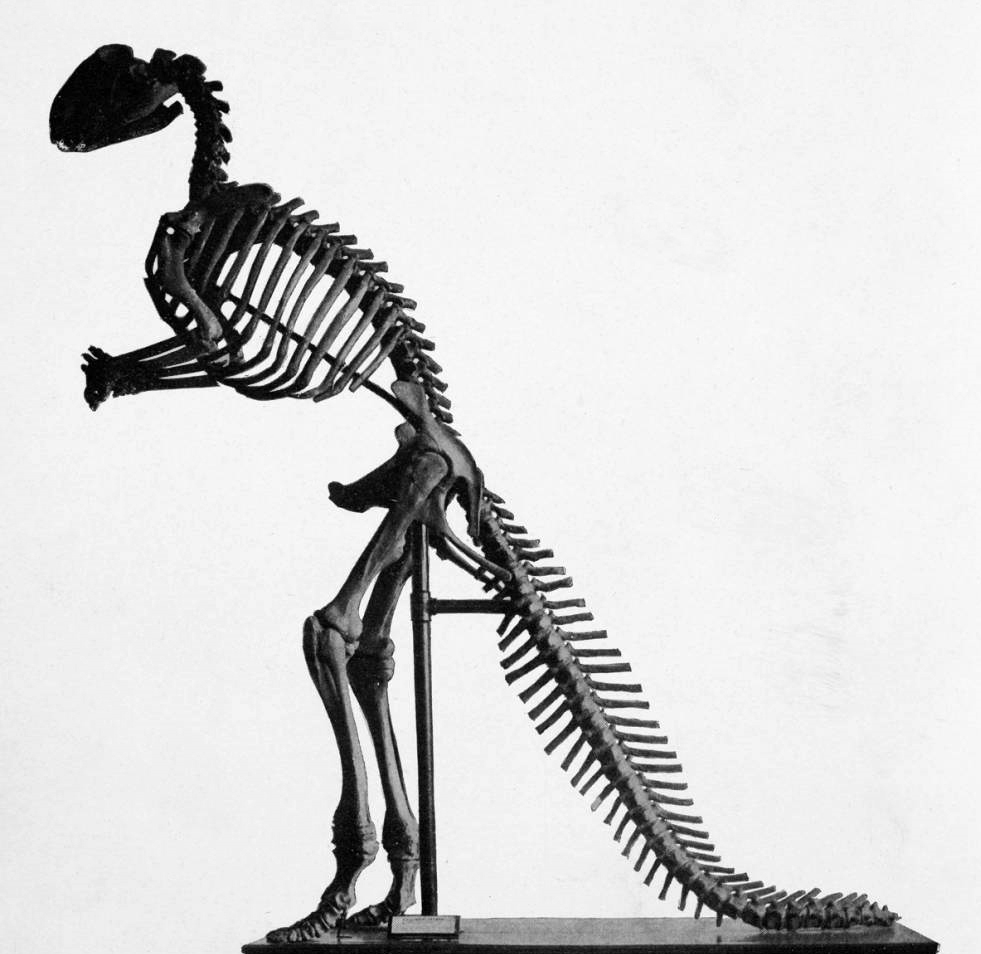
Benjamin Waterhouse Hawkins' mounted Hadrosaurus. Legislation sponsored by Shusted made the hadrosaur New Jersey's state dinosaur.

At the urging of a group of fourth graders at Strawbridge Elementary School in Haddon Township, Shusted co-sponsored legislation in the Assembly in June 1989 to name the Hadrosaurus foulkii as the official state dinosaur; the dinosaur became the world's first dinosaur to be displayed in public, after its bones were unearthed by a scientist digging in a marl pit in the borough in 1858. The proposed legislation would make New Jersey the first state with an official dinosaur. After being reintroduced by Rocco and Shusted, the legislation was signed into law in 1991 by Governor James Florio.

In the 1989 general election, with Republicans holding a two-seat margin in the Assembly, Rocco and Shusted faced off against Democrats Barbara Berman (who had lost the seat to Rocco and Shusted in 1979) and her running mate Mary Ellen Talbott, with 10,000 more registered Democrats in the district than Republicans. Abortion rights played a major role in the election, with the Democratic challengers supporting a woman's right to make a choice while the incumbents supported limits, with Shusted opposing abortion under any circumstances. Rocco and Shusted pointed to their seniority after 10 years in the Assembly as a benefit to residents of the district, with Shusted serving as chairman of the Assembly Judiciary Committee On Election Day, results showed Rocco taking one seat, with Berman 122 votes ahead of Shusted for the second seat; after a recount of the 65,000 ballots cast on machines and via absentee ballots, Superior Court Judge Donald Bigley ruled that Shusted had won the second seat by a 34-vote margin.

After Republicans regained control of the Camden County Board of Chosen Freeholders in the 1990 elections, Shusted resigned from the Assembly on January 31, 1991 to become Camden County counsel, a job that came with a salary of $82,500 annually, more than double what he had earned as a legislator. Freeholder Lee Solomon was sworn in to fill the vacant seat on February 21, 1991, having been chosen by Republican county committee members from the district.
