= John A. Rocco =

American politician (1936–2020)

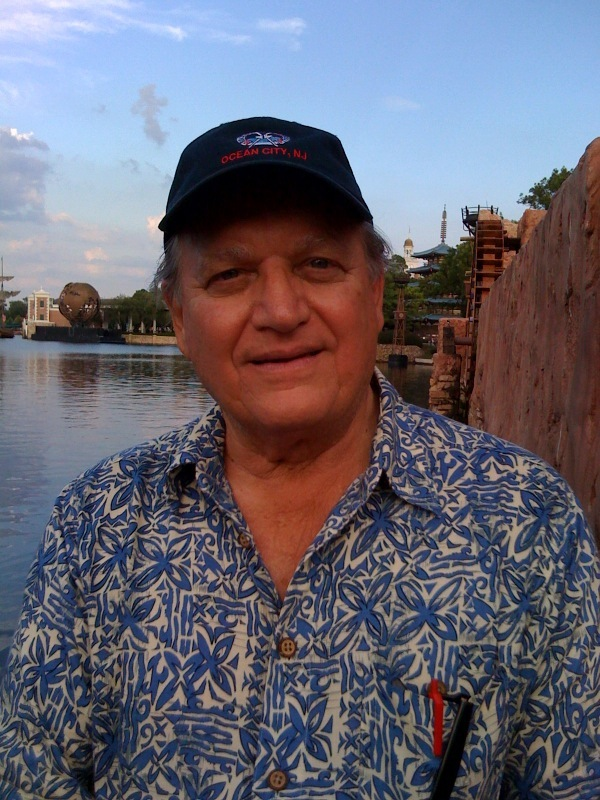

Member of the New Jersey General Assembly from the 6th district
- In office January 8, 1980 – January 13, 1998 Serving with Thomas J. Shusted, Lee Solomon and Louis Greenwald
- Preceded by: Barbara Berman, Mary Keating Croce
- Succeeded by: Mary Previte

Personal details
- Born: June 25, 1936 Philadelphia, Pennsylvania, U.S.
- Died: April 8, 2020 (aged 83) Voorhees Township, New Jersey, U.S.
- Party: Republican
- Education: West Chester University (BS); Villanova University (MA); Rutgers University (EdD)

John A. Rocco (June 25, 1936 – April 8, 2020) was an American Republican Party politician who served in the New Jersey General Assembly from 1980 to 1998, where he represented the 6th Legislative District. Rocco also served as Mayor of Cherry Hill, New Jersey.

== Biography ==
Born in South Philadelphia, Rocco was accepted at the age of 6 into Girard College.

Rocco earned his undergraduate degree from West Chester College with a major in education, earned a master's degree in education from Villanova University and was awarded a Doctor of Education degree from Rutgers University. From 1964 to 1968, he was the principal of Woodcrest School, part of the Cherry Hill Public Schools. From 1968 to 1979, he was an associate professor at Camden County College, and then that school's director of continuing education. Rocco later became a professor at Rowan College.

== Elected office ==
Rocco served as mayor of Cherry Hill from 1975 to 1977 and was a member of its township council from 1977 to 1979. He was a delegate to the Republican National Convention in 1980 and 1988. He was chosen to serve as a member of the National Commission for Employment Policy from 1983 to 1989. In 1979, Rocco was elected to the Assembly together with running mate Thomas J. Shusted, unseating Democratic incumbents Barbara Berman and Mary Keating Croce. In the Assembly, Rocco was the Assistant Minority Whip in 1984 and 1985, Speaker Pro Tempore from 1986 to 1989 and was the Deputy Speaker starting in 1992. He served as Chair of the Education Committee and as Vice Chair of the Joint Committee on Public Schools.

Legislation proposed by Rocco in 1996 would allow parents to opt out of public school requirements to wear school uniforms. In December 1997, Rocco introduced legislation in the Assembly that would ban public school students from selling candy and other fundraising items door to door, as well as prohibit programs that offered students incentives for higher sales figures. The bill, which would make New Jersey the second in the nation to implement such a ban, was proposed following the rape and Killing of Eddie Werner, an 11-year-old boy from Jackson Township who had been selling candy and wrapping paper to residents near his home. In 1997, Rocco lost to Democratic incumbent John Adler in the race for the New Jersey Senate by a margin of 53%-47%.

== Death ==
Rocco died of respiratory failure on April 8, 2020, at a hospice in Voorhees Township, New Jersey.
