= Jacob Rupertus =

American handgun designer and manufacturer

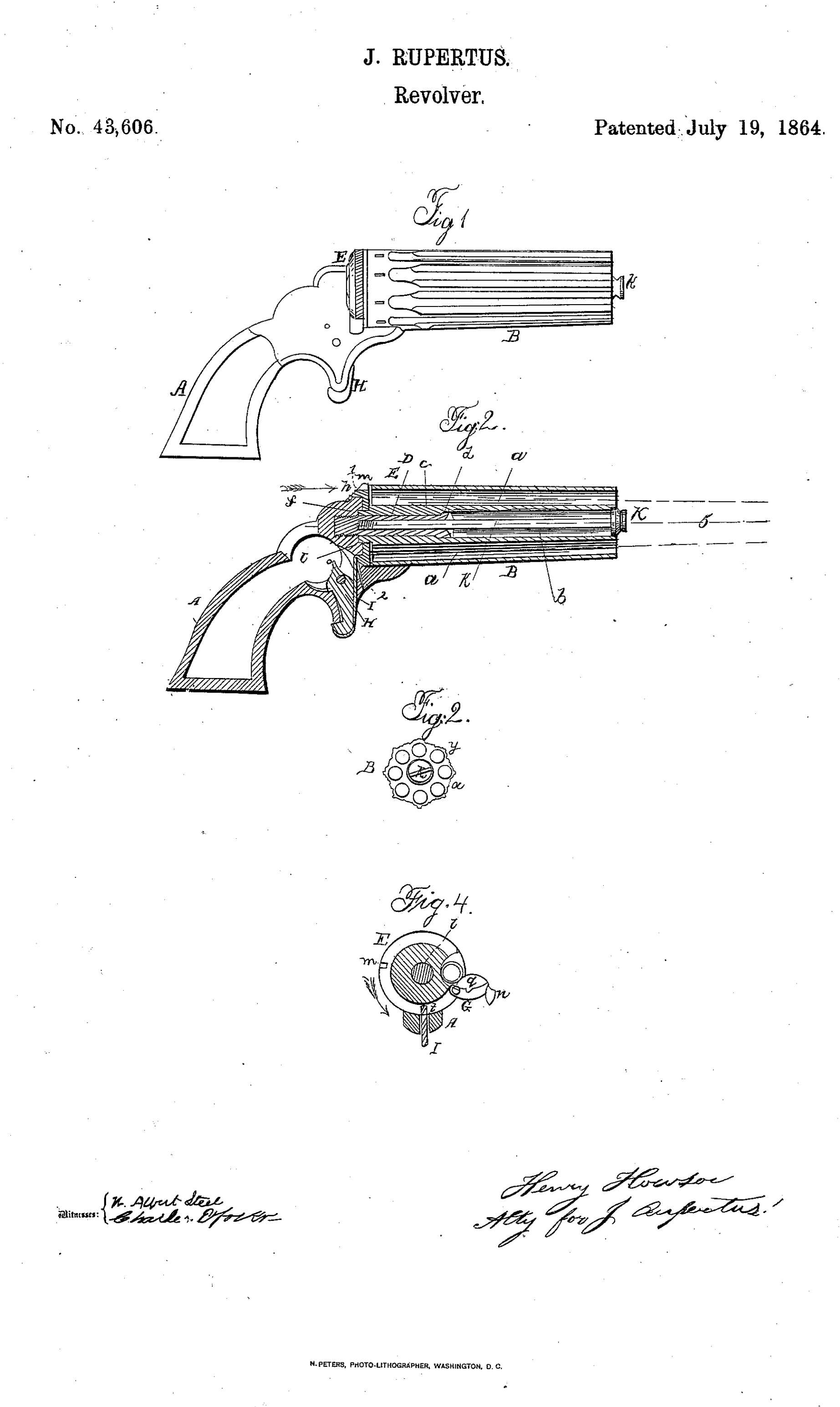
Jacob Rupertus, Patent US43606 "Pepper-Box"

Jacob Rupertus (1822/1823 – 1921) was an American handgun designer and manufacturer.

== Formative years and family ==
This Jacob Rupertus should not be confused with another Jacob Rupertus (1827-1900), who also lived in Philadelphia, but was not involved in gun manufacturing.

This Jacob Rupertus was born in the Kingdom of Bavaria sometime around 1822 or 1823 and died in Laurel Springs, New Jersey, on February 14, 1921.

Sometime around 1849, he wed Caroline Bechtel, who had been born on February 12, 1831, in Leiterswiller, Bas-Rhin, Alsace, France; she died in Laurel Springs on February 26, 1911. They were buried in the now defunct American Mechanics Cemetery in Philadelphia.

== Career ==
Rupertus founded the Rupertus Patented Pistol Manufacturing Company, which was located 1924 North 4th Street in Philadelphia and was in operation between 1859 and 1899.

On July 19, 1864, he received the US patent No.43.606 for a revolver with a rotating multi-shot barrel group (pepper-box).
