= Barbara Berman (politician) =

American politician (born 1938)

Barbara P. Berman

Member of the New Jersey General Assembly from the 6th Legislative District
- In office January 10, 1978 – January 8, 1980 Serving with Mary Keating Croce
- Preceded by: John J. Gallagher
- Succeeded by: John A. Rocco and Thomas J. Shusted

Personal details
- Born: April 30, 1938 (age 87) Brooklyn, New York
- Party: Democratic

Barbara P. Berman (born April 30, 1938) is an American Democratic Party politician who served in the New Jersey General Assembly for a single term, where she represented the 6th Legislative District from 1978 to 1980.

== Early life and education ==
Berman was born on April 30, 1938, in Brooklyn, where she attended Erasmus Hall High School and then Brooklyn College.

== Public service ==
Before running for office in 1977, Berman had served as Camden County's Director of Consumer Affairs.

Berman and her Democratic Party running mate Mary Keating Croce, who was seeking her third term in office, defeated Republicans Mario A. Iavicoli and William K. Dickey, a former Speaker of the Assembly; Berman came in second, edging Iavicoli by a 170-vote margin.

When Berman took office in January 1978, she and Croce became the first pair of women to be elected to a single Assembly district in state history, and were two of the 12 women taking office in the Assembly, the highest number ever to serve together in the 80-seat body.

In the 1979 general election, Republicans John A. Rocco and Thomas J. Shusted defeated Berman and Croce to win the two assembly seats in the 6th Legislative District, which covered portions of Burlington County and Camden County; Berman came in third, more than 1,300 votes behind.

In the 1989 general election, with Republicans holding a two-seat margin in the Assembly, Berman and running mate Mary Ellen Talbott faced off against Republican incumbents Rocco and Shusted (the same two candidates who had knocked her out of the Assembly 10 years earlier), in a 6th District that then had 10,000 more registered Democrats than Republicans. Abortion rights played a major role in the election, with the Democratic challengers supporting a woman's right to make a choice while the incumbents supported limits, with Shusted opposing abortion under any circumstances. Rocco and Shusted pointed to their seniority after 10 years in the Assembly as a benefit to residents of the district, with Shusted serving as chairman of the Assembly Judiciary Committee. On Election Day, results showed Rocco taking one seat, with Berman 122 votes ahead of Shusted for the second seat; after a recount of the 65,000 ballots cast on machines and via absentee ballots, Superior Court Judge Donald Bigley ruled that Shusted had won the second seat by a 34-vote margin. After hearing the final ruling, Berman accepted the final result, saying "I am a lady, and I wish Mr. Shusted well," continuing that "if he won, he won fairly. That's what elections are all about."

In August 1991, Berman dropped her independent bid in what was a three-way race for mayor of Cherry Hill, simplifying the path for the re-election of Democrat Susan Bass Levin.
