= New Jersey's 6th legislative district =

American legislative district

- Senator: James Beach (D)
- Assembly members: Louis Greenwald (D); Melinda Kane (D)
- Registration: 45.43% Democratic; 19.84% Republican; 33.62% unaffiliated
- Demographics: 64.4% White; 10.7% Black/African American; 0.4% Native American; 10.3% Asian; 0.0% Hawaiian/Pacific Islander; 6.3% Other race; 7.8% Two or more races; 13.3% Hispanic
- Population: 234,108
- Voting-age population: 184,707
- Registered voters: 186,310

New Jersey's 6th legislative district is one of 40 in the New Jersey Legislature, covering the Burlington County municipality of Maple Shade Township and the Camden County municipalities of Audubon Park Borough, Berlin Borough, Berlin Township, Clementon, Cherry Hill Township, Gibbsboro Borough, Haddon Township, Haddonfield Borough, Hi-Nella Borough, Laurel Springs, Lawnside, Lindenwold, Magnolia, Oaklyn Borough, Pine Hill Borough, Somerdale Borough, Stratford Borough, Tavistock Borough and Voorhees Township.

== Demographic characteristics ==
As of the 2020 United States census, the district had a population of 234,108, of whom 184,707 (78.9%) were of voting age. The racial makeup of the district was 150,824 (64.4%) White, 25,121 (10.7%) African American, 896 (0.4%) Native American, 24,176 (10.3%) Asian, 103 (0.0%) Pacific Islander, 14,822 (6.3%) from some other race, and 18,166 (7.8%) from two or more races. Hispanic or Latino of any race were 31,071 (13.3%) of the population.

The district had 186,310 registered voters as of December 1, 2021, of whom 63,956 (34.3%) were registered as unaffiliated, 87,315 (46.9%) were registered as Democrats, 32,986 (17.7%) were registered as Republicans, and 2,053 (1.1%) were registered to other parties.

== Political representation ==
For the 2026–2027 session, the 6th legislative district of the New Jersey Legislature is represented in the State Senate by James Beach (D, Voorhees Township) and in the General Assembly by Louis Greenwald (D, Voorhees Township) and Melinda Kane (D, Cherry Hill).

The legislative district is entirely located within New Jersey's 1st congressional district.

== 1965–1973 ==
The 1964 Supreme Court decision in Reynolds v. Sims required legislative districts' populations be as equal as possible. As an interim measure, the 6th district in the 1965 State Senate election encompassed all of Mercer County and elected one person to the Senate. In this case, incumbent Democratic Mercer County Senator Sido L. Ridolfi was elected for a two-year term beginning in 1966.

For the three terms between 1967 and 1973, the sixth Senate district was split into two Assembly districts. For the 1967 election, since the Sixth only encompassed one county, two senators were elected at-large; in this case, Democrats Ridolfi and Richard J. Coffee were elected for this four-year term. In the 1971 election, with the addition of Hunterdon County into the Sixth, Senate candidates were nominated by Assembly district (see below) and one senator was elected from each district. Republican William E. Schluter was elected from District 6A and Democrat Joseph P. Merlino was elected from District 6B in the 1971 election.

Two Assembly members were elected from each district in 1967, 1969, and 1971. Assembly District 6B was made up of Trenton and Ewing Township while District 6A was composed of the remainder of Mercer County for the 1967 and 1969 elections. In the 1971 election, District 6B was composed of Trenton, Hamilton Township, and Washington Township with District 6A encompassing the remainder of Mercer and the entirety of Hunterdon County.

The members elected to the Assembly from each district are as follows:

Session	District 6A	District 6B
1968–1969	William E. Schluter (R)	Joseph P. Merlino (D)
1968–1969	John A. Selecky (R)	S. Howard Woodson (D)
1970–1971	William E. Schluter (R)	Joseph P. Merlino (D)
1970–1971	Karl Weidel (R)	S. Howard Woodson (D)
1972–1973	Walter E. Foran (R)	Francis J. McManimon (D)
1972–1973	Karl Weidel (R)	S. Howard Woodson (D)

== District composition since 1973 ==
Upon the creation of 40 equal-population districts in 1973, the 6th district became based around the eastern suburbs of Camden inclusive of Cherry Hill in all iterations. The 1970s district stretched from Berlin borough north to Pennsauken and included Burlington County's Evesham Township and Palmyra. The 1981 redistricting made the 6th solely Camden County-based by heading from Pine Hill east then north to Merchantville, and the cluster of boroughs around Collingswood, Haddonfield, and Haddon Heights. The 1991 redistricting kept the 6th relatively unchanged. The 2001 redistricting removed some of the small boroughs in the Haddon Heights and Barrington vicinity but brought the district to the southern edge of Camden County to include Winslow Township, Chesilhurst, and Waterford Township. Following the 2011 redistricting, the southern Camden County municipalities were eliminated from the 6th and restored some of the immediate Camden suburbs including Collingswood and Pennsauken and expanded the district into Burlington County for the first time since 1982 by including Maple Shade.

== Election history ==
Session	Senate	General Assembly	
1974–1975	Alene S. Ammond (D)	John J. Gallagher (D)	Mary Keating Croce (D)
1976–1977	Alene S. Ammond (D)	John J. Gallagher (D)	Mary Keating Croce (D)
1978–1979	Lee B. Laskin (R)	Barbara Berman (D)	Mary Keating Croce (D)
1980–1981	Lee B. Laskin (R)	John A. Rocco (R)	Thomas J. Shusted (R)
1982–1983	Lee B. Laskin (R)	John A. Rocco (R)	Thomas J. Shusted (R)
1984–1985	Lee B. Laskin (R)	John A. Rocco (R)	Thomas J. Shusted (R)
1986–1987	Lee B. Laskin (R)	John A. Rocco (R)	Thomas J. Shusted (R)
1988–1989	Lee B. Laskin (R)	John A. Rocco (R)	Thomas J. Shusted (R)
1990–1991	Lee B. Laskin (R)	John A. Rocco (R)	Thomas J. Shusted (R) (Note: Resigned on January 31, 1991 to become Camden County counsel)
1990–1991	Lee B. Laskin (R)	John A. Rocco (R)	Lee Solomon (R) (Note: Appointed February 21, 1991)
1992–1993	John Adler (D)	John A. Rocco (R)	Lee Solomon (R)
1994–1995	John Adler (D)	John A. Rocco (R)	Lee Solomon (R)
1996–1997	John Adler (D)	John A. Rocco (R)	Louis Greenwald (D)
1998–1999	John Adler (D)	Mary Previte (D)	Louis Greenwald (D)
2000–2001	John Adler (D)	Mary Previte (D)	Louis Greenwald (D)
2002–2003	John Adler (D)	Mary Previte (D)	Louis Greenwald (D)
2004–2005	John Adler (D)	Mary Previte (D)	Louis Greenwald (D)
2006–2007	John Adler (D)	Pamela Rosen Lampitt (D)	Louis Greenwald (D)
2008–2009	John Adler (D) (Note: Resigned by January 3, 2009 upon election to the U.S. House of Representatives)	Pamela Rosen Lampitt (D)	Louis Greenwald (D)
2008–2009	James Beach (D) (Note: Appointed on January 3, 2009, won November 2009 special election to complete unexpired term)	Pamela Rosen Lampitt (D)	Louis Greenwald (D)
2010–2011	James Beach (D)	Pamela Rosen Lampitt (D)	Louis Greenwald (D)
2012–2013	James Beach (D)	Pamela Rosen Lampitt (D)	Louis Greenwald (D)
2014–2015	James Beach (D)	Pamela Rosen Lampitt (D)	Louis Greenwald (D)
2016–2017	James Beach (D)	Pamela Rosen Lampitt (D)	Louis Greenwald (D)
2018–2019	James Beach (D)	Pamela Rosen Lampitt (D)	Louis Greenwald (D)
2020–2021	James Beach (D)	Pamela Rosen Lampitt (D)	Louis Greenwald (D)
2022–2023	James Beach (D)	Pamela Rosen Lampitt (D)	Louis Greenwald (D)
2024–2025	James Beach (D)	Pamela Rosen Lampitt (D) (Note: Resigned December 31, 2024 to become Camden County Clerk)	Louis Greenwald (D)
2024–2025	James Beach (D)	Melinda Kane (D) (Note: Appointed January 23, 2025)	Louis Greenwald (D)
2026-2027	James Beach (D)	Melinda Kane (D)	Louis Greenwald (D)

== Election results, 1973–present ==
=== Senate ===
2021 New Jersey general election
Party	Candidate	Votes	%	±%
Democratic	James Beach	48,508	64.9	▼4.5
Republican	John Foley	26,292	35.1	▲4.5
Total votes		74,800	100.0	

New Jersey general election, 2017
Party	Candidate	Votes	%	±%
Democratic	James Beach	41,376	69.4	▲6.0
Republican	Robert Shapiro	18,249	30.6	▼6.0
Total votes		59,625	100.0	

New Jersey general election, 2013
Party	Candidate	Votes	%	±%
Democratic	James Beach	34,847	63.4	▲1.3
Republican	Sudhir Deshmukh	20,080	36.6	▼1.3
Total votes		54,927	100.0	

2011 New Jersey general election
Party	Candidate	Votes	%
Democratic	James Beach	25,297	62.1
Republican	Phil Mitsch	15,415	37.9
Total votes		40,712	100.0

Special election, November 3, 2009
Party	Candidate	Votes	%	±%
Democratic	James Beach	36,582	58.2	▼3.7
Republican	Joseph A. Adolf	26,280	41.8	▲3.7
Total votes		62,862	100.0	

2007 New Jersey general election
Party	Candidate	Votes	%	±%
Democratic	John H. Adler	25,737	61.9	▲0.9
Republican	Joseph A. Adolf	15,846	38.1	▼0.9
Total votes		41,583	100.0	

2003 New Jersey general election
Party	Candidate	Votes	%	±%
Democratic	John H. Adler	29,033	61.0	▼5.7
Republican	Joseph A. Adolf	18,534	39.0	▲5.7
Total votes		47,567	100.0	

2001 New Jersey general election
Party	Candidate	Votes	%
Democratic	John H. Adler	39,336	66.7
Republican	Jane A. Greenfogel	19,635	33.3
Total votes		58,971	100.0

1997 New Jersey general election
Party	Candidate	Votes	%	±%
Democratic	John H. Adler	34,073	53.0	▼6.8
Republican	John A. Rocco	28,938	45.0	▲4.8
Conservative	Kenneth L. Mayo	1,257	2.0	N/A
Total votes		64,268	100.0	

1993 New Jersey general election
Party	Candidate	Votes	%	±%
Democratic	John H. Adler	38,235	59.8	▲4.4
Republican	Louise Di Renzo Donaldson	25,752	40.2	▼4.4
Total votes		63,987	100.0	

1991 New Jersey general election
Party	Candidate	Votes	%
Democratic	John H. Adler	31,289	55.4
Republican	Lee B. Laskin	25,191	44.6
Total votes		56,480	100.0

1987 New Jersey general election
Party	Candidate	Votes	%	±%
Republican	Lee B. Laskin	31,162	53.2	▼10.1
Democratic	Maria Barnaby Greenwald	27,444	46.8	▲10.1
Total votes		58,606	100.0	

1983 New Jersey general election
Party	Candidate	Votes	%	±%
Republican	Lee B. Laskin	29,783	63.3	▲6.6
Democratic	Francis J. Ward	17,235	36.7	▼6.6
Total votes		47,018	100.0	

1981 New Jersey general election
Party	Candidate	Votes	%
Republican	Lee B. Laskin	36,279	56.7
Democratic	James Greenberg	27,735	43.3
Total votes		64,014	100.0

1977 New Jersey general election
Party	Candidate	Votes	%	±%
Republican	Lee B. Laskin	29,823	52.1	▲5.3
Democratic	Victor Pachter	27,449	47.9	▼5.3
Total votes		57,272	100.0	

1973 New Jersey general election
Party	Candidate	Votes	%
Democratic	Alene S. Ammond	27,320	53.2
Republican	John L. Miller	24,072	46.8
Total votes		51,392	100.0

=== General Assembly ===
2021 New Jersey general election
Party	Candidate	Votes	%	±%
Democratic	Louis D. Greenwald	48,497	33.1	▼1.7
Democratic	Pamela R. Lampitt	47,612	32.5	▼1.4
Republican	Ed Farmer	25,537	17.4	▲1.6
Republican	Richard Super	25,015	17.1	▲1.6
Total votes		146,661	100.0	

2019 New Jersey general election
Party	Candidate	Votes	%	±%
Democratic	Louis D. Greenwald	31,550	34.8	▼1.2
Democratic	Pamela R. Lampitt	30,708	33.9	▼0.8
Republican	Cynthia Plucinski	14,284	15.8	▲1.3
Republican	John Papeika	14,082	15.5	▲1.4
Total votes		90,624	100.0	

New Jersey general election, 2017
Party	Candidate	Votes	%	±%
Democratic	Louis D. Greenwald	41,767	36.0	▲3.4
Democratic	Pamela R. Lampitt	40,291	34.7	▲3.7
Republican	David C. Moy	16,811	14.5	▼2.5
Republican	Winston Extavour	16,335	14.1	▼2.4
American Solidarity	Monica Sohler	821	0.7	N/A
Total votes		116,025	100.0	

New Jersey general election, 2015
Party	Candidate	Votes	%	±%
Democratic	Louis D. Greenwald	21,087	32.6	▲1.9
Democratic	Pamela R. Lampitt	20,028	31.0	▲2.0
Republican	Holly Tate	11,023	17.0	▼3.5
Republican	Claire H. Gustafson	10,679	16.5	▼3.3
Green	Amanda Davis	985	1.5	N/A
Green	James Bracciante	850	1.3	N/A
Total votes		64,652	100.0	

New Jersey general election, 2013
Party	Candidate	Votes	%	±%
Democratic	Louis D. Greenwald	33,232	30.7	▲0.7
Democratic	Pamela R. Lampitt	31,366	29.0	▲0.1
Republican	Chris Leone-Zwillinger	22,147	20.5	▼0.2
Republican	George R. Fisher	21,399	19.8	▼0.6
Total votes		108,144	100.0	

New Jersey general election, 2011
Party	Candidate	Votes	%
Democratic	Louis D. Greenwald	24,272	30.0
Democratic	Pamela R. Lampitt	23,342	28.9
Republican	Allan Richardson	16,714	20.7
Republican	Gregory Horton	16,461	20.4
Total votes		80,789	100.0

New Jersey general election, 2009
Party	Candidate	Votes	%	±%
Democratic	Louis D. Greenwald	36,446	29.5	▲0.7
Democratic	Pamela R. Lampitt	33,320	27.0	▼0.7
Republican	Scot DeCristofaro	27,005	21.9	▲1.4
Republican	Brian Greenberg	26,581	21.5	▲1.8
Total votes		123,352	100.0	

New Jersey general election, 2007
Party	Candidate	Votes	%	±%
Democratic	Louis D. Greenwald	23,626	28.8	▼2.5
Democratic	Pamela R. Lampitt	22,701	27.7	▼0.9
Republican	JoAnn R. Gurenlian	16,850	20.5	▼0.3
Republican	Bradley L. Mattson	16,199	19.7	▲0.4
Green	Michael Gellman	2,677	3.3	N/A
Total votes		82,053	100.0	

New Jersey general election, 2005
Party	Candidate	Votes	%	±%
Democratic	Louis D. Greenwald	38,211	31.3	▲2.5
Democratic	Pamela Rosen Lampitt	34,961	28.6	▲0.2
Republican	JoAnn R. Gurenlian	25,365	20.8	▲1.4
Republican	Marc Fleischner	23,587	19.3	▼0.2
Total votes		122,124	100.0	

New Jersey general election, 2003
Party	Candidate	Votes	%	±%
Democratic	Louis D. Greenwald	27,228	28.8	▼3.9
Democratic	Mary T. Previte	26,798	28.4	▼3.9
Republican	Mark Otto	18,421	19.5	▲1.9
Republican	Joann R. Gurenlian	18,342	19.4	▲2.0
Green	Kevin Madden	1,951	2.1	N/A
Green	Martin Nolan	1,778	1.9	N/A
Total votes		94,518	100.0	

New Jersey general election, 2001
Party	Candidate	Votes	%
Democratic	Louis D. Greenwald	38,327	32.7
Democratic	Mary T. Previte	37,895	32.3
Republican	Anthony "Tony" Clark	20,688	17.6
Republican	Lou Harvey	20,452	17.4
Total votes		117,362	100.0

New Jersey general election, 1999
Party	Candidate	Votes	%	±%
Democratic	Louis D. Greenwald	23,663	30.1	▲1.1
Democratic	Mary T. Previte	22,462	28.5	▲0.9
Republican	Robert J. Seltzer	15,505	19.7	▼2.3
Republican	Gerard M. Banmiller	15,293	19.4	▼2.0
Green	Jay Fox	947	1.2	N/A
Independent	Gerard "Gerry" Brigante	852	1.1	N/A
Total votes		78,722	100.0	

New Jersey general election, 1997
Party	Candidate	Votes	%	±%
Democratic	Louis D. Greenwald	35,883	29.0	▲2.7
Democratic	Mary T. Previte	34,105	27.6	▲3.2
Republican	Thomas Shusted, Jr.	27,236	22.0	▼2.9
Republican	Susan R. Rose	26,453	21.4	▼3.1
Total votes		123,677	100.0	

New Jersey general election, 1995
Party	Candidate	Votes	%	±%
Democratic	Louis D. Greenwald	23,743	26.3	▲3.0
Republican	Dr. John A. Rocco	22,520	24.9	▼2.3
Republican	Lee A. Solomon	22,125	24.5	▼2.5
Democratic	Annette Castiglione-Degan	22,039	24.4	▲1.9
Total votes		90,427	100.0	

New Jersey general election, 1993
Party	Candidate	Votes	%	±%
Republican	John A. Rocco	35,316	27.2	▼1.3
Republican	Lee A. Solomon	35,089	27.0	▼1.1
Democratic	Jane M. Kershner	30,208	23.3	▲1.4
Democratic	John Phillip Maroccia	29,142	22.5	▲0.9
Total votes		129,755	100.0	

1991 New Jersey general election
Party	Candidate	Votes	%
Republican	John A. Rocco	31,533	28.5
Republican	Lee A. Solomon	31,095	28.1
Democratic	Lewis “Robbie” Friedner	24,231	21.9
Democratic	Dr. Leonard P. Krivy	23,920	21.6
Total votes		110,779	100.0

1989 New Jersey general election
Party	Candidate	Votes	%	±%
Republican	John A. Rocco	33,528	25.7	▼3.3
Republican	Thomas J. Shusted	32,459	24.88	▼3.1
Democratic	Barbara Berman	32,425	24.86	▲2.9
Democratic	Mary Ellen Talbott	32,039	24.6	▲3.6
Total votes		130,451	100.0	

1987 New Jersey general election
Party	Candidate	Votes	%	±%
Republican	John A. Rocco	33,057	29.0	▼3.7
Republican	Thomas J. Shusted	31,965	28.0	▼3.6
Democratic	John J. Tarditi, Jr.	25,112	22.0	▲3.6
Democratic	Patrick J. Brennan	24,028	21.0	▲3.7
Total votes		114,162	100.0	

1985 New Jersey general election
Party	Candidate	Votes	%	±%
Republican	John A. Rocco	32,812	32.7	▲4.9
Republican	Thomas J. Shusted	31,679	31.6	▲3.9
Democratic	Carl B. Viniar	18,425	18.4	▼4.8
Democratic	Harry Benn	17,382	17.3	▼4.0
Total votes		100,298	100.0	

New Jersey general election, 1983
Party	Candidate	Votes	%	±%
Republican	John A. Rocco	25,969	27.8	▲1.4
Republican	Thomas J. Shusted	25,821	27.7	▲1.6
Democratic	Michael G. Brennan	21,609	23.2	▼0.9
Democratic	Bernard A. Platt	19,855	21.3	▼2.2
Total votes		93,254	100.0	

New Jersey general election, 1981
Party	Candidate	Votes	%
Republican	John A. Rocco	33,535	26.4
Republican	Thomas J. Shusted	33,154	26.1
Democratic	M. Bruce MacNaul	30,632	24.1
Democratic	Francis J. Orlando	29,916	23.5
Total votes		127,237	100.0

New Jersey general election, 1979
Party	Candidate	Votes	%	±%
Republican	John A. Rocco	23,922	27.0	▲1.9
Republican	Thomas J. Shusted	22,627	25.5	▲1.3
Democratic	Barbara Berman	21,294	24.0	▼1.2
Democratic	Mary Keating Croce	20,912	23.6	▼1.9
Total votes		88,755	100.0	

New Jersey general election, 1977
Party	Candidate	Votes	%	±%
Democratic	Mary Keating Croce	29,466	25.5	▼0.1
Democratic	Barbara Berman	29,163	25.24	▼1.5
Republican	Mario A. Iavicoli	28,993	25.10	▲2.9
Republican	William K. Dickey	27,909	24.2	▼0.2
Total votes		115,531	100.0	

New Jersey general election, 1975
Party	Candidate	Votes	%	±%
Democratic	J. Jack Gallagher	25,081	26.7	▲0.1
Democratic	Mary Keating Croce	23,990	25.6	0.0
Republican	William K. Dickey	22,922	24.4	▼0.5
Republican	Eugene Raymond, III	20,853	22.2	▼0.7
U.S. Labor	Shirley Fingerman	985	1.0	N/A
Total votes		93,831	100.0	

New Jersey general election, 1973
Party	Candidate	Votes	%
Democratic	John J. Gallagher, Jr.	26,846	26.6
Democratic	Mary Keating Croce	25,874	25.6
Republican	William K. Dickey	25,118	24.9
Republican	Eugene Raymond III	23,131	22.9
Total votes		100,969	100.0

== Election results, 1965–1973 ==
=== Senate ===
==== District 6 at-large ====
1965 New Jersey general election
Party	Candidate	Votes	%
Democratic	Sido L. Ridolfi	56,231	62.2
Republican	William E. Schluter	33,821	37.4
Socialist Labor	Joseph J. Frank	284	0.3
Total votes		90,336	100.0

1967 New Jersey general election
Party	Candidate	Votes	%
Democratic	Sido L. Ridolfi	47,226	28.5
Democratic	Richard J. Coffee	45,960	27.8
Republican	Bruce M. Schragger	36,928	22.3
Republican	George Y. Schoch	34,762	21.0
Socialist Labor	Joseph J. Frank	651	0.4
Total votes		165,527	100.0

==== District 6A ====
1971 New Jersey general election
Party	Candidate	Votes	%
Republican	William E. Schluter	31,072	55.3
Democratic	Robert R. Klein	25,091	44.7
Total votes		56,163	100.0

==== District 6B ====
1971 New Jersey general election
Party	Candidate	Votes	%
Democratic	Joseph P. Merlino	29,758	70.0
Republican	Charles A. Delehey	12,740	30.0
Total votes		42,498	100.0

=== General Assembly ===
==== District 6A ====
New Jersey general election, 1967
Party	Candidate	Votes	%
Republican	William E. Schluter	24,232	26.4
Republican	John A. Selecky	23,505	25.6
Democratic	Francis J. McManimon	21,387	23.3
Democratic	Lloyd A. Carver	20,765	22.6
Peace; Human Rights	Paul I. Jacobs	1,963	2.1
Total votes		91,852	100.0

New Jersey general election, 1969
Party	Candidate	Votes	%
Republican	William E. Schluter	33,011	27.1
Republican	Karl Weidel	32,722	26.9
Democratic	Archibald S. Alexander, Jr.	28,179	23.1
Democratic	Paul J. Sollami	27,118	22.3
Independent Party	Orlando P. De George	382	0.3
Independent Party	Roger W. Blease, Jr.	347	0.3
Total votes		121,759	100.0

New Jersey general election, 1971
Party	Candidate	Votes	%
Republican	Karl Weidel	30,305	27.7
Republican	Walter E. Foran	30,279	27.7
Democratic	Eone G. Harger	25,287	23.1
Democratic	Robert M. Hendry	23,599	21.6
Total votes		109,470	100.0

==== District 6B ====
New Jersey general election, 1967
Party	Candidate	Votes	%
Democratic	Joseph P. Merlino	21,097	29.8
Democratic	S. Howard Woodson	19,330	27.3
Republican	Dominick A. Iorio	15,559	21.9
Republican	Philip A. Levy	14,927	21.0
Total votes		70,913	100.0

New Jersey general election, 1969
Party	Candidate	Votes	%
Democratic	Joseph P. Merlino	20,302	31.2
Democratic	S. Howard Woodson, Jr.	19,309	29.7
Republican	Charles A. Delehey	12,781	19.7
Republican	Edward T. Converse	12,206	18.8
Independent Party	Arthur E. Kaminski	433	0.7
Total votes		65,031	100.0

New Jersey general election, 1971
Party	Candidate	Votes	%
Democratic	Francis J. McManimon	26,839	31.6
Democratic	S. Howard Woodson, Jr.	22,210	26.1
Republican	John K. Rafferty	19,372	22.8
Republican	Peter H. Rossi	16,640	19.6
Total votes		85,061	100.0
