= John J. Gallagher (politician) =

American politician

Member of the New Jersey General Assembly from the 6th Legislative District
- In office January 8, 1974 – January 10, 1978 Serving with Mary Keating Croce
- Preceded by: District created
- Succeeded by: Barbara Berman

Personal details
- Born: May 13, 1944 (age 82)
- Party: Democratic

John J. Gallagher (born May 13, 1944) is an American politician who served in the New Jersey General Assembly from 1974 to 1978.
