= James Beach =

Member of the New Jersey Senate

Member of the New Jersey Senate from the 6th district
- Incumbent
- Assumed office January 3, 2009
- Preceded by: John Adler

Chair of the New Jersey Senate State Government, Wagering, Tourism & Historic Preservation Committee
- Incumbent
- Assumed office August 22, 2017
- Preceded by: Jim Whelan

Chair of the New Jersey Senate Military and Veterans Affairs Committee
- In office January 10, 2012 – January 9, 2018
- Succeeded by: Vin Gopal

Camden County Clerk
- In office January 1, 1996 – January 3, 2009
- Preceded by: Michael Keating
- Succeeded by: Joseph Ripa

Member of the Camden County Board of Chosen Freeholders
- In office January 1, 1991 – January 1, 1996

Personal details
- Born: October 28, 1946 (age 79)
- Party: Democratic
- Spouse: Linda Beach
- Education: B.A. Midwestern College (Psychology and Physical Education); M.A. Rowan University (Personnel Services)
- Profession: Property damage specialist, all risk
- Website: Legislative website

James "Jim" Beach (born October 28, 1946) is an American Democratic Party politician who has served in the New Jersey Senate since 2009, where he represents the 6th legislative district. He has been the assistant majority leader in the Senate since 2016.

== Early life ==
Beach has earned a B.S. degree in psychology from Midwestern College and a M.A. degree in personnel services from Rowan University. A resident of Voorhees Township, Beach first entered Camden County politics after responding to a 1990 recruitment ad that county Democrats had posted seeking prospective candidates to burnish the party's image and help retain the Democrats' control of county government. Beach showed up at his interview with his tax bill complaining about his taxes, and was described by Freeholder Jeffrey L. Nash as just what the party was seeking in a candidate, "regular people complaining about their taxes". He was elected to the Camden County Board of Chosen Freeholders in 1991, and was named as freeholder director in 1993. Beach was elected as Camden County Clerk in 1995.

== New Jersey Senate ==
He served as county clerk until 2009 until he was appointed to the Senate seat formerly held by John Adler, who had won a seat in the United States House of Representatives. With the endorsement of George Norcross, Beach ran unopposed in the convention. Beach won a November 2009 special election in order to remain in the Senate through the end of Adler's four-year term. Beach saw his salary drop from $153,437 annually as county clerk to $49,000 as state senator, and indicated after his selection to fill the Senate seat that he would seek additional employment to supplement his salary, ensuring that there was no conflict with his position as senator. Beach was soon hired by Camden County College for a part-time job as an advisor, allowing him to collect an annual salary of $10,400 and remain in New Jersey's Public Employee Retirement System, for which county clerks but not state senators are eligible. After critical editorials in The Star-Ledger and the Courier-Post accused Beach of abusing the public pension system, Beach left the Camden County College job. He has served as Assistant Majority Leader since 2014.

=== Committees ===
Committee assignments for the 2024—2025 Legislative Session are:

- State Government, Wagering, Tourism & Historic Preservation (as chair)

=== District 6 ===
Each of the 40 districts in the New Jersey Legislature has one representative in the New Jersey Senate and two members in the New Jersey General Assembly. Representatives from the 6th District for the 2024—2025 Legislative Session are:

- Senator James Beach (D)
- Assemblyman Louis Greenwald (D)
- Assemblywoman Pamela Rosen Lampitt (D)

== Personal life ==
Beach had worked as an educator and football coach at schools including both St. Joseph's High School and Eastside High School in Camden and Highland Regional High School in Blackwood, and had been director of vocational education at the Black Horse Pike Regional School District.

== Election history ==
=== Senate ===
6th Legislative District General Election, 2023
Party	Candidate	Votes	%
Democratic	James Beach (incumbent)	34,911	70.0
Republican	Mark Doogan	14,947	30.0
Total votes		49,858	100.0
Democratic hold			

New Jersey general election, 2021
Party	Candidate	Votes	%	±%
Democratic	James Beach	48,508	64.9	▼4.5
Republican	John Foley	26,292	35.1	▲4.5
Total votes		'74.800'	'100.0'	

New Jersey general election, 2017
Party	Candidate	Votes	%	±%
Democratic	James Beach	41,376	69.4	▲6.0
Republican	Robert Shapiro	18,249	30.6	▼6.0
Total votes		'59,625'	'100.0'	

New Jersey State Senate elections, 2013
Party	Candidate	Votes	%
Democratic	James Beach (incumbent)	34,847	63.4
Republican	Sudhir Deshmukh	20,080	36.6
Democratic hold			

New Jersey State Senate elections, 2011
Party	Candidate	Votes	%
Democratic	James Beach (incumbent)	25,297	62.1
Republican	Phil Mitsch	15,415	37.9
Democratic hold			

New Jersey State Senate Special elections, 2009
Party	Candidate	Votes	%
Democratic	James Beach (incumbent)	36,582	58.2
Republican	Joseph A. Adolf	26,280	41.8
Democratic hold			

New Jersey Senate
Preceded by John Adler	Member of the New Jersey Senate from the 6th District; January 3, 2009–present	Succeeded by Incumbent
