= Mary Previte =

American politician (1932–2019)

Member of the New Jersey General Assembly from the 6th Legislative District
- In office January 10, 1998 – January 9, 2006 Serving with Louis Greenwald
- Preceded by: John A. Rocco
- Succeeded by: Pamela Rosen Lampitt

Personal details
- Born: September 7, 1932 Kaifeng, Henan, China
- Died: November 16, 2019 (aged 87) Camden, New Jersey, U.S.
- Party: Democratic
- Education: Greenville College; Glassboro State College

Mary Evelyn Previte (September 7, 1932 – November 16, 2019) was an American Democratic Party politician who served in the New Jersey General Assembly, where she represented the 6th legislative district from 1998 to 2006.

== Life and career ==
Born in Kaifeng, China on September 7, 1932, Previte was the great-granddaughter of James Hudson Taylor, the founder of China Inland Mission. As a young girl, Previte was a student at the Chefoo School at Yantai in Shandong, China and spent three years in a Japanese concentration camp at Weihsien Compound during World War II, from which she was liberated by American paratroopers on August 17, 1945. Over 50 years later, in 1997, she began to seek out and thank, in person, each of the soldiers who had been involved in liberating the camp.

At the age of 14, Previte lost her left hand in a revolving saw accident. But this did not hinder her from going on to attend Spring Arbor Junior College and later graduate with a B.A. from Greenville College and received an M.A. from Glassboro State College (now Rowan University) in English / Education.

She served on the Voorhees Board of Education in 1966 and 1967 and a trustee on the Haddonfield Board of Education from 1972 to 1974. Previte was the Administrator of Camden County Youth Center for over 20 years and was elected in 1997 as the first female president of the New Jersey Juvenile Detention Association.

In 1994, she published Hungry Ghosts, the story of her experience as Administrator of the Youth Center.

Previte was elected to the New Jersey General Assembly representing the 6th legislative district from 1998 to 2006. She served on the Juvenile Justice and Delinquency Prevention Advisory Committee since 1995. She served on the Advisory Council on Juvenile Justice in 1994. Previte served in the Assembly on the Family, Women and Children's Services Committee (as Chair), the Federal Relations Committee and the Regulated Professions and Independent Authorities Committee. She did not seek reelection to the Assembly in 2005, and was succeeded by fellow Democrat Pamela Rosen Lampitt. She died on November 16, 2019, at the age of 87 from complications of injuries sustained after being struck by a motor vehicle weeks prior.

== Published works ==
- Hungry Ghosts ISBN 978-0-310-20665-1

== See also ==
- Norman Howard Cliff
