= Lee Solomon =

American judge (born 1954)

Justice of the Supreme Court of New Jersey
- In office June 19, 2014 – August 17, 2024
- Appointed by: Chris Christie
- Preceded by: John E. Wallace Jr.
- Succeeded by: John Jay Hoffman

Member of the New Jersey General Assembly from the 6th district
- In office February 21, 1992 – January 9, 1996 Serving with John A. Rocco
- Preceded by: Thomas J. Shusted
- Succeeded by: Louis Greenwald

Personal details
- Born: August 17, 1954 (age 70); Philadelphia, Pennsylvania, U.S.
- Political party: Republican
- Spouse: Dianne Solomon
- Education: Muhlenberg College (BS); Widener University (JD)

Lee A. Solomon (born August 17, 1954) is a former justice of the Supreme Court of New Jersey. He was nominated by Governor Chris Christie to serve on May 21, 2014 and confirmed by the New Jersey Senate and sworn in on June 19, 2014. He reached mandatory retirement age on August 17, 2024.

== Biography ==
Solomon was born in Philadelphia in 1954 and graduated from Central High School. He is a 1975 graduate of Muhlenberg College where he became a member of Phi Kappa Tau fraternity and graduated in 1978 from Widener University School of Law. Before his Supreme Court tenure, he had been an elected Republican politician serving as councilman from the borough of Haddon Heights, a Camden County Freeholder, and a member of the New Jersey General Assembly from the 6th Legislative District from 1992 until 1996. In 1992, he was an unsuccessful candidate for Congress running against Rob Andrews in the 1st congressional district. He has also served as Camden County prosecutor and as a Deputy U.S. Attorney for the New Jersey District during the time Christie was the U.S. Attorney for the district.

In 2006, Solomon was appointed by Governor Richard Codey to be a judge in the Superior Court from Camden County, first in the family division, later the criminal division. He was president of the New Jersey Board of Public Utilities (BPU) from February 23, 2010 until December 2011. At the end of his BPU term, he rejoined the Superior Court in the Civil Division and later an assignment judge. Solomon was nominated to the Supreme Court in 2014 by Christie as a part of a deal with Senate Democrats to fill two vacant seats on the court. He was confirmed by the Senate in a 36 to 2 vote. On April 26, 2021, Governor Phil Murphy nominated Solomon for tenure in 2021, and the Senate confirmed him for tenure on June 3, 2021 by a vote of 37-0. Solomon retired on August 17, 2024.

In August 2020, Solomon wrote for the majority when it found that the constitutional right against self-incrimination did not prevent a police officer from being compelled to provide the passcodes to iPhones he was accused of using to provide tip-offs to a drug trafficker.

Solomon and his wife Dianne live in Haddonfield, New Jersey. His wife has been a member of the BPU since June 2013 and served as president of the board in 2014.

== See also ==
- List of Jewish American jurists
- List of justices of the Supreme Court of New Jersey

New Jersey General Assembly
| Preceded by Thomas J. Shusted | Member of the New Jersey General Assembly from the 6th district 1992–1996; Served alongside: John A. Rocco | Succeeded by Louis Greenwald |
Legal offices
| Preceded by John E. Wallace Jr. | Justice of the Supreme Court of New Jersey; 2014–2024 | Succeeded by John Jay Hoffman |
