= Mary Keating Croce =

American politician

Member of the New Jersey General Assembly from the 6th Legislative District
- In office January 8, 1974 – January 8, 1980 Serving with John J. Gallagher and Barbara Berman
- Preceded by: Newly created
- Succeeded by: John A. Rocco and Thomas J. Shusted

Personal details
- Born: December 4, 1928 Camden, New Jersey
- Died: October 21, 2016 (aged 87) Pennsauken Township, New Jersey
- Party: Democratic
- Spouse(s): Remo M. Croce; Anthony "Sonny" DiSabato
- Children: 7
- Education: Camden High School

Mary Keating Croce DiSabato (December 4, 1928 – October 21, 2016) was an American Democratic Party politician who served in the New Jersey General Assembly for three two-year terms, where she represented the 6th Legislative District from 1974 to 1980. She served as the Chairwoman of the New Jersey State Parole Board in the 1990s.

== Personal life ==
Born in Camden, New Jersey on December 4, 1928, she attended Camden High School, graduating as part of the class of 1946.

A resident of Pennsauken Township, New Jersey, she died at the age of 87 on October 21, 2016. She was survived by her husband, Anthony "Sonny" DiSabato, as well as by two sons and five daughters she had with Remo M. Croce, who died before she did.

== Public service ==
Croce served as a longtime member of the Camden County Democratic Committee, starting during the 1960s and continuing through the 1990s.

In the November 1973 general election, Croce and Democratic running mate John J. Gallagher were elected to represent the 6th Legislative District in the New Jersey General Assembly, the first election in which the 40-district legislature was established under the terms of the 1964 U.S. Supreme Court decision in Reynolds v. Sims, which required the populations of legislative districts to be as equal as possible. The new 6th District was based around the eastern suburbs of Camden inclusive of Cherry Hill, stretching from Berlin borough north to Pennsauken and included Burlington County's Evesham Township and Palmyra. Croce and Gallagher defeated Republicans William K. Dickey, a former Speaker of the Assembly, and Eugene Raymond III. Croce and Gallagher were re-elected in 1975, again defeating both Dickey and Raymond.

In 1977, Croce and running mate Barbara Berman, running in her first race for elected office, defeated Republicans Mario A. Iavicoli and Dickey (for the third time); Croce was the top vote-getter and Berman came in second, edging Iavicoli by a 170-vote margin.

When Berman and Croce took office in January 1978, she and Berman became the first pair of women to be elected to a single Assembly district in state history, and were two of the 12 women taking office in the Assembly, the highest number ever to serve together in the 80-seat body.

In the 1979 general election, Republicans John A. Rocco and Thomas J. Shusted defeated Berman and Croce to win the two assembly seats in the 6th Legislative District; Berman came in third, more than 1,300 votes behind.

She chaired the New Jersey State Parole Board from 1993 to 1998.
