= Melinda Kane =

American politician

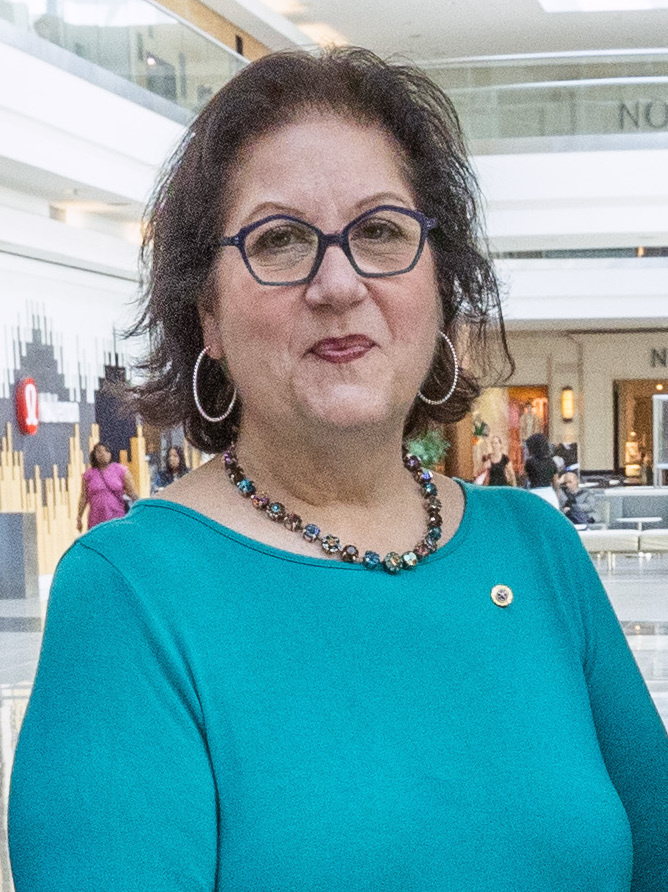

Member of the New Jersey General Assembly from the 6th district
- Incumbent
- Assumed office January 23, 2025 Serving with Louis Greenwald
- Preceded by: Pamela Rosen Lampitt

Member of the Camden County Board of County Commissioners from Seat 3
- In office 2019–2025
- Preceded by: Bill Moen
- Succeeded by: Rhonda Wardlow-Hurley

Personal details
- Party: Democratic
- Education: State University of New York at Geneseo BA; Widener University
- Website: Legislative webpage

Melinda Kane is an American Democratic Party politician who represents the 6th Legislative District in the New Jersey General Assembly. Kane was selected by a special convention to fill the vacancy following Pamela Rosen Lampitt's resignation to become the Camden County Clerk in 2025. Kane had previously served on the Camden County Board of County Commissioners.

== Early life and education ==
Kane earned a Bachelor of Arts in special and elementary education from the State University of New York at Geneseo and post graduate studies in Educational Social Work at Widener University. She is Jewish.

== Political career ==
=== New Jersey General Assembly ===
Kane was first sworn in to the Assembly on January 23, 2025, and won her first full term as an Assemblywoman in the November 2025 general election. She serves in the General Assembly on the Appropriations; Health; and the Military and Veterans' Affairs committees.

== Personal life ==
Kane is a Gold Star Mother.

New Jersey General Assembly
Preceded by Pamela Rosen Lampitt	Member of the New Jersey General Assembly for the 6th District; January 23, 2025 – present With: Louis Greenwald	Succeeded by Incumbent
