= Pamela Rosen Lampitt =

Member of the New Jersey General Assembly

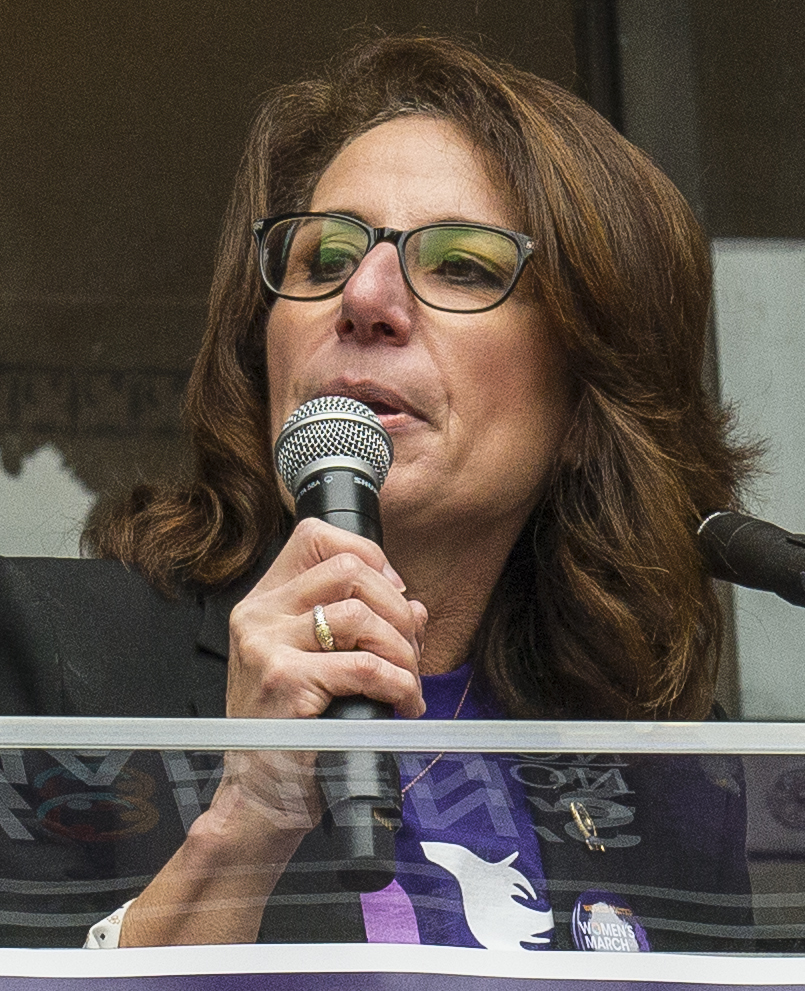

Member of the New Jersey General Assembly from the 6th District
- In office January 10, 2006 – December 31, 2024
- Preceded by: Mary Previte
- Succeeded by: Melinda Kane

Deputy Speaker of the New Jersey General Assembly
- In office January 10, 2012 – December 31, 2024
- Leader: Sheila Oliver; Vincent Prieto; Craig Coughlin
- Preceded by: Jack Conners
- Succeeded by: Vacant

Chair of the New Jersey General Assembly Committee on Education
- In office January 9, 2018 – December 31, 2024
- Preceded by: Marlene Caride
- Succeeded by: Vacant

Camden County Clerk
- Incumbent
- Assumed office 2024
- Preceded by: Joseph Ripa

Personal details
- Born: Pamela Rosen; December 19, 1960 (age 65) Natick, Massachusetts
- Party: Democratic
- Spouse: Charles Lampitt
- Education: Johnson & Wales University
- Occupation: Director of Business Services, Hospitality Services
- Website: Legislative Website

Pamela Rosen Lampitt (born December 19, 1960) is an American Democratic Party politician, who is the current clerk of Camden County, New Jersey. She previously represented the 6th legislative district in the New Jersey General Assembly from 2006 to 2024. She served as the Deputy Speaker in the General Assembly starting in 2012.

== Personal life ==
Lampitt was born in Natick, Massachusetts. She graduated from Johnson & Wales University with a degree in Culinary Arts and Management. Lampitt has worked at the University of Pennsylvania for 40 years and currently is the Director of Business Services, Hospitality Services. She has served on a number of steering committees on the campus, working on the Committee for Manufacturer Responsibility, which ensures university products are manufactured under fair labor standards. Lampitt and her husband, Charles, have two children, a daughter, Ilene, and a son, Andrew. She is Jewish.

== New Jersey Assembly ==
Lampitt was elected to the Assembly on November 8, 2005, filling the seat of fellow Democrat Mary Previte, who did not run for re-election and had held the seat in the Assembly since 1998. In 2007, Lampitt was the lead sponsor of the Comprehensive Statewide Transfer Agreement, which allows community college students to "seamlessly" transfer credits to four-year public universities. The law has been called "the Lampitt law". She resigned at the end of 2024 after being elected as Camden County clerk.

=== Committees ===
Committee assignments for the current session are:

- Education, Chair
- Health, Vice-Chair
- Appropriations

=== District 6 ===
Each of the 40 districts in the New Jersey Legislature has one representative in the New Jersey Senate and two members in the New Jersey General Assembly. Representatives from the 6th District for the 2024—2025 Legislative Session are:

- Senator James Beach (D)
- Assemblyman Louis Greenwald (D)
- Assemblywoman Pamela Rosen Lampitt (D)

== Electoral history ==
=== New Jersey General Assembly ===
6th Legislative District General Election, 2023
Party	Candidate	Votes	%
Democratic	Louis D. Greenwald (incumbent)	34,717	35.1
Democratic	Pamela R. Lampitt (incumbent)	34,185	34.6
Republican	Danielle M. Barry	15,067	15.2
Republican	Brian McRory	14,945	15.1
Total votes		98,914	100.0
Democratic hold			

6th legislative district general election, 2021
Party	Candidate	Votes	%
Democratic	Louis D. Greenwald (incumbent)	48,497	33.07%
Democratic	Pamela R. Lampitt (incumbent)	47,612	32.46%
Republican	Ed Farmer	25,537	17.41%
Republican	Richard Super	25,015	17.06%
Total votes		146,661	100.0
Democratic hold			

6th Legislative District General Election, 2019
Party	Candidate	Votes	%
Democratic	Louis Greenwald (incumbent)	30,166	34.7%
Democratic	Pamela Lampitt (incumbent)	29,354	33.77%
Republican	Cynthia Plucinski	13,801	15.88%
Republican	John Papeika	13,612	15.66%
Total votes		86,933	100%

New Jersey general election, 2017
Party	Candidate	Votes	%	±%
Democratic	Louis Greenwald	41,767	36.0	▲3.4
Democratic	Pamela Rosen Lampitt	40,291	34.7	▲3.7
Republican	David C. Moy	16,811	14.5	▼2.5
Republican	Winston Extavour	16,335	14.1	▼2.4
American Solidarity	Monica Sohler	821	0.7	N/A
Total votes		'116,025'	'100.0'	

New Jersey general election, 2015
Party	Candidate	Votes	%	±%
Democratic	Louis Greenwald	21,087	32.6	▲1.9
Democratic	Pamela Rosen Lampitt	20,028	31.0	▲2.0
Republican	Holly Tate	11,023	17.0	▼3.5
Republican	Claire H. Gustafson	10,679	16.5	▼3.3
Green	Amanda Davis	985	1.5	N/A
Green	James Bracciante	850	1.3	N/A
Total votes		'64,652'	'100.0'	

New Jersey general election, 2013
Party	Candidate	Votes	%	±%
Democratic	Louis Greenwald	33,232	30.7	▲0.7
Democratic	Pamela Rosen Lampitt	31,366	29.0	▲0.1
Republican	Chris Leone-Zwillinger	22,147	20.5	▼0.2
Republican	George R. Fisher	21,399	19.8	▼0.6
Total votes		'108,144'	'100.0'	

New Jersey general election, 2011
Party	Candidate	Votes	%
Democratic	Louis Greenwald	24,272	30.0
Democratic	Pamela Rosen Lampitt	23,342	28.9
Republican	Allan Richardson	16,714	20.7
Republican	Gregory Horton	16,461	20.4
Total votes		80,789	100.0

New Jersey general election, 2009
Party	Candidate	Votes	%	±%
Democratic	Louis Greenwald	36,446	29.5	▲0.7
Democratic	Pamela Rosen Lampitt	33,320	27.0	▼0.7
Republican	Scot DeCristofaro	27,005	21.9	▲1.4
Republican	Brian Greenberg	26,581	21.5	▲1.8
Total votes		'123,352'	'100.0'	

New Jersey general election, 2007
Party	Candidate	Votes	%	±%
Democratic	Louis Greenwald	23,626	28.8	▼2.5
Democratic	Pamela Rosen Lampitt	22,701	27.7	▼0.9
Republican	JoAnn R. Gurenlian	16,850	20.5	▼0.3
Republican	Bradley L. Mattson	16,199	19.7	▲0.4
Green	Michael Gellman	2,677	3.3	N/A
Total votes		'82,053'	'100.0'	

New Jersey general election, 2005
Party	Candidate	Votes	%	±%
Democratic	Louis Greenwald	38,211	31.3	▲2.5
Democratic	Pamela Rosen Lampitt	34,961	28.6	▲0.2
Republican	JoAnn R. Gurenlian	25,365	20.8	▲1.4
Republican	Marc Fleischner	23,587	19.3	▼0.2
Total votes		'122,124'	'100.0'	

=== Camden County Clerk ===
County of Camden 2024 General Election November 5, 2024
Party	Candidate	Votes	%
Democratic	Pamela Rosen Lampitt	149,690	63.99
Republican	Jennifer Exler	84,229	36.01
Total votes		233,919	100

New Jersey General Assembly
Preceded by Mary Previte	Member of the New Jersey General Assembly for the 6th District; January 10, 2006 – December 31, 2024; With: Louis Greenwald	Succeeded by Melinda Kane
