= John Adler =

American politician and lawyer (1959–2011)

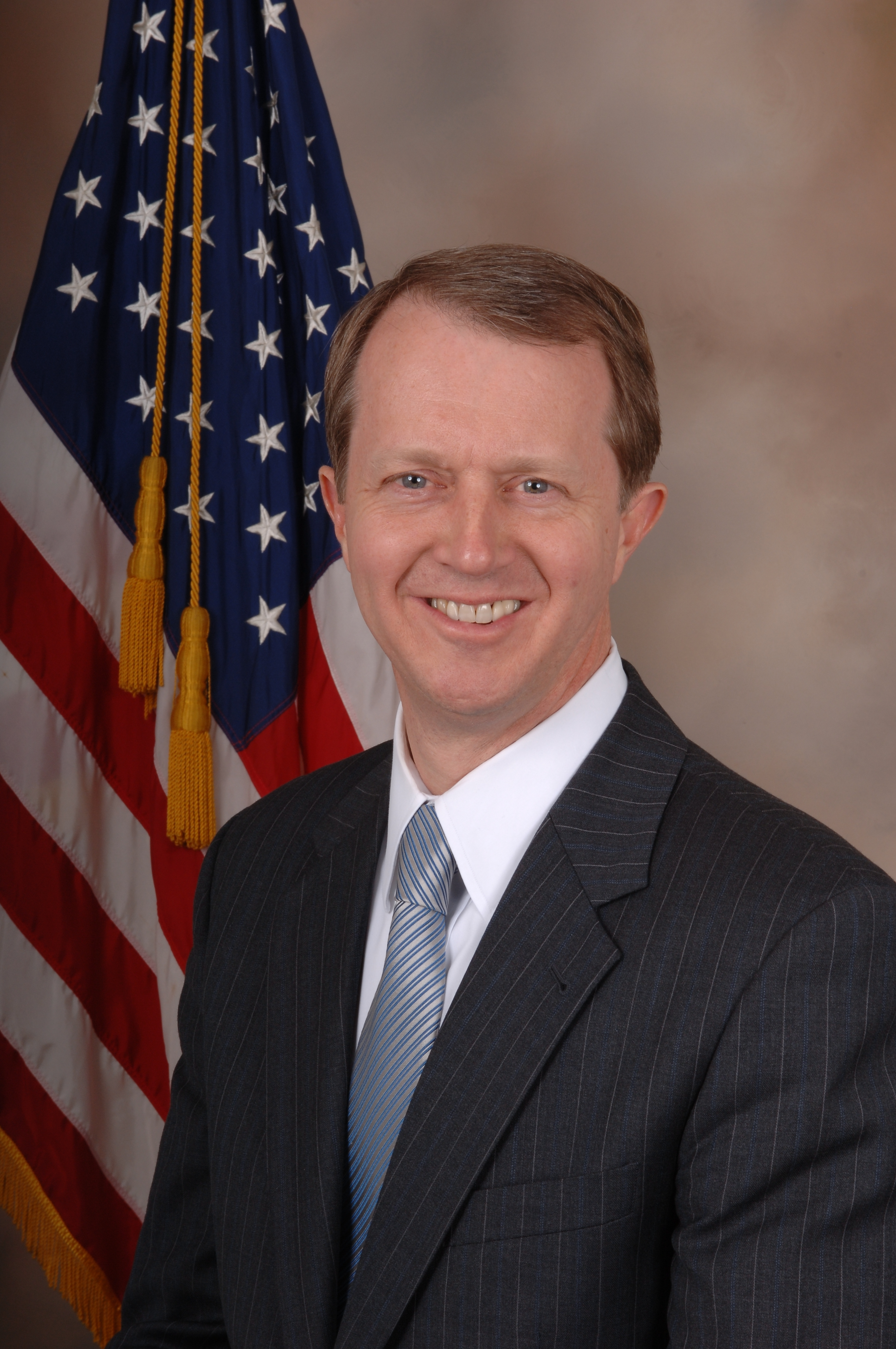

Member of the U.S. House of Representatives from New Jersey's 3rd district
- In office January 3, 2009 – January 3, 2011
- Preceded by: Jim Saxton
- Succeeded by: Jon Runyan

Member of the New Jersey Senate from the 6th district
- In office January 14, 1992 – January 3, 2009
- Preceded by: Lee B. Laskin
- Succeeded by: James Beach

Personal details
- Born: John Herbert Adler; August 23, 1959 Philadelphia, Pennsylvania, U.S.
- Died: April 4, 2011 (aged 51) Philadelphia, Pennsylvania, U.S.
- Cause of death: Complications from staphylococcal infection
- Resting place: Locustwood Memorial Park, Cherry Hill Township
- Party: Democratic
- Spouse: Shelley Levitan
- Children: 4
- Education: Harvard University (BA, JD)
- Profession: Attorney

John Herbert Adler (August 23, 1959 – April 4, 2011) was an American lawyer, politician and a member of the Democratic Party who served for one term as the U.S. representative for New Jersey's 3rd congressional district from 2009 until 2011. Prior to joining Congress, Adler was a member of the New Jersey Senate from 1992 to 2009.

Only a few months after leaving the House, Adler unexpectedly died after suffering from endocarditis as a result of getting a staphylococcal infection.

== Early life and education ==
Adler was born in Philadelphia, the son of Mary Louise (née Beatty) and John Herbert Adler. His ancestry included German (including Bavarian), English, and Irish. He moved to Haddonfield, New Jersey when he was two years old. His father owned a small dry cleaning store. When Adler was in high school, his father died after a series of heart attacks. Adler and his mother lost the family business, and survived off his father's Social Security benefits for widows and minors. He attended Haddonfield Memorial High School. He earned a Bachelor of Arts degree in government from Harvard College and a Juris Doctor from Harvard Law School. He paid for law school through student loans, grants, and working odd jobs throughout college.

== Early political career ==
From 1988 until 1989, Adler served on the Cherry Hill Township Council. While serving on the council, Adler passed the township's ethics ordinance.

In 1990, Adler challenged incumbent Jim Saxton for his seat in New Jersey's 3rd Congressional District. Adler was defeated by Saxton by a margin of 60% to 40%.

== New Jersey State Senate ==
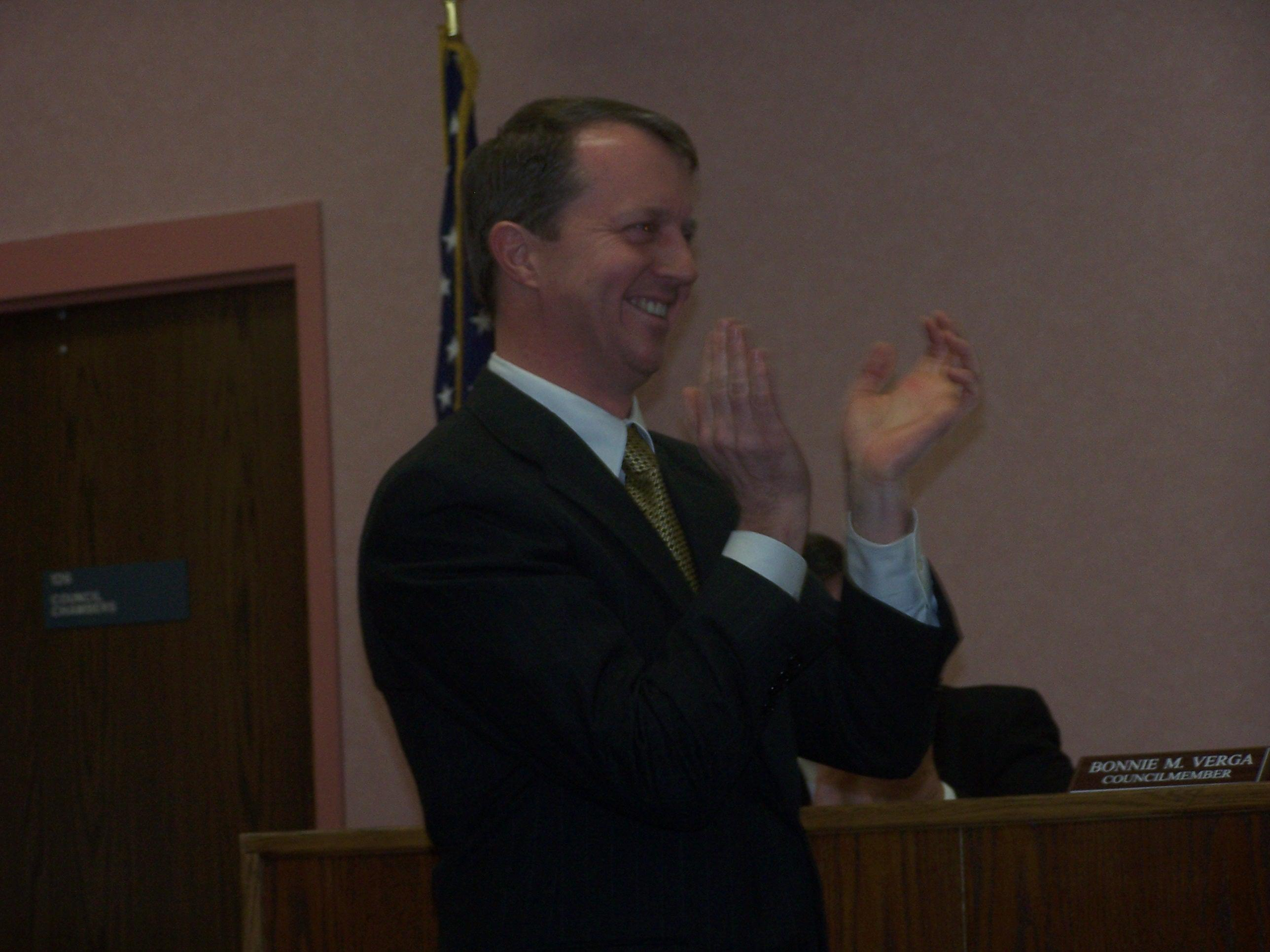
Adler applauds a motion of the New Jersey Legislature.

Adler was elected in 1991 to the New Jersey Senate, where he served from 1992 until 2009 representing New Jersey’s 6th Legislative District. While in the Senate, Adler served on the Judiciary Committee (as Chair) and the Environment Committee. He served on the New Jersey Israel Commission since 1995, and on the New Jersey Intergovernmental Relations Commission from 1994 to 2002.

=== Legislation ===
Adler was co-sponsor of the New Jersey Smoke-Free Air Act, enacted in 2006, which banned smoking in almost all public places. Adler was one of three co-sponsors of a Senate bill submitted in 2008 that would extend the smoking ban to casinos and simulcasting facilities, which had been exempted in the earlier version of the ban.

Adler co-sponsored legislation that strips government pensions from public employees who are convicted of or plead guilty to corruption charges.

Adler co-sponsored a bill that would expand voting rights for military personnel and New Jersey citizens overseas to include state and local elections. The bill was signed into law on August 12, 2008, by Governor Corzine.

== U.S. House of Representatives ==
=== Committee assignments ===
- Committee on Financial Services
  - Subcommittee on Capital Markets, Insurance, and Government-Sponsored Enterprises
  - Subcommittee on Domestic Monetary Policy and Technology
  - Subcommittee on Oversight and Investigations
- Committee on Veterans' Affairs
  - Subcommittee on Economic Opportunity
  - Subcommittee on Oversight and Investigations

U.S. Congressman Adler was ranked by The National Journal as one of the ten most centrist members in the House of Representatives. He is ranked as 50.5 percent liberal and 49.5 percent conservative.

=== Legislation ===
Adler was in favor of the American Recovery and Reinvestment Act. Adler voted against the Troubled Asset Relief Program (TARP), and later voted to end the program. In January 2009, Adler announced his first bill as a U.S. Representative: the Safeguarding America's Seniors and Veterans Act, which mandated a one-time payment of $500 to persons eligible for Social Security, railroad retirement, or veterans disability benefits. According to a statement by Adler's office, the bill was necessary because "the American Recovery and Reinvestment Act of 2009 fails to address the needs of our seniors and veterans". The bill attracted 11 cosponsors; it was referred to the House Veterans Affairs Subcommittee on Health, and progressed no further. Adler voted for the Dodd–Frank Wall Street Reform and Consumer Protection Act.

In November 2009 and March 2010, Adler voted against House and the Senate Health Care bills. He did not sign a petition circulated by Iowa Republican Steve King calling for a complete repeal of the law.

Adler voted in favor of the American Clean Energy and Security Act.

== Political campaigns ==
=== 2008 ===
On September 20, 2007, Adler announced that he planned a second challenge to Saxton. By this time, the district had been renumbered as New Jersey's 3rd congressional district. The district stretches from the suburbs of Philadelphia to Ocean County. On November 9, 2007, Saxton announced that he would not seek reelection in 2008, citing prostate cancer. This dramatically altered the dynamics of the race; instead of facing a 25-year incumbent, Adler was now running in an open seat. Adler was unopposed in the Democratic primary, and faced Republican Medford Mayor, Lockheed Martin executive, and Gulf War veteran Chris Myers. Adler held a financial advantage over his opponent through all of the race, holding a 10–1 or 5–1 funding edge over Myers for a majority of the campaign. Adler had raised the most money in the country of any non-incumbent congressional candidate.

Adler received a number of endorsements for the election, including those from the Teamsters, Fraternal Order of Police, National Association of Police Organizations, Professional Firefighters Association of New Jersey, New Jersey Environmental Federation, The Sierra Club, the Humane Society Legislative Fund, The National Committee to Preserve Social Security and Health Care, and the Recreational Fishing Alliance.

The Democratic Congressional Campaign Committee committed $1.7 million in ad buys to Adler's campaign. In comparison, the NRCC committed $84,200 in coordinated ad buys with the Myers campaign, in addition to help the NRCC gave in financing an internal poll in September with the Myers campaign. Myers also benefited from two ad buys by the 501(c)(4) organization Freedom's Watch, which attacked John Adler on his tax record, his legislative history, and contributions he received from subprime mortgage companies.

Adler won a majority of newspaper endorsements. He was endorsed by the Press of Atlantic City, The Philadelphia Inquirer, The New York Times, the Burlington County Times, the Courier-Post, Myers received the endorsement of the Asbury Park Press.

The 3rd district race was the last one to be called in New Jersey on Election Night 2008. Adler ultimately defeated Myers with 52.08% of the vote to Myers' 47.92%. He was sworn into his position as the Congressman from the 3rd district of New Jersey in the United States House of Representatives on January 6, 2009, the first Democrat to represent this district in 123 years. The district was the 1st for most of the time until 1967, then was the 6th from 1967 to 1983, the 13th from 1983 to 1993, and has been the 3rd since 1993.

=== 2010 ===
Adler lost the 2010 midterm election to Republican nominee Jon Runyan. Adler received 47.3% of the vote, while Runyan received slightly more than half the votes cast. Runyan is a former Philadelphia Eagles star and a Mount Laurel resident.

In addition to Runyan, Adler was challenged by NJ Tea Party nominee Peter DeStefano, Libertarian nominee Russ Conger, and Your Country Again nominee Lawrence J. Donahue.

Republicans heavily targeted this seat in this election cycle. A warning sign for Adler came in the New Jersey gubernatorial race in 2009, when Republican candidate Chris Christie carried Adler's district by 17 points over Democratic Governor Jon Corzine Governor Christie campaigned hard for Runyan, calling Adler a "career politician".

Some Democratic operatives asserted that Adler campaign staffers and the Camden County Democratic Committee (CCDC) recruited Tea Party candidate Peter DeStefano in an attempt to split the conservative vote and benefit Adler. New Jersey Tea Party groups said they had never heard of DeStefano until he had a strong showing in a July poll released by the Adler campaign. On October 8, 2010, the Associated Press reported, based on the details of an earlier article at CourierPostOnline.com, that there was "mounting evidence" that the Democrats recruited DeStefano. The article noted that a Democratic Party employee ran DeStefano's website and that many of the signatures on DeStefano's nominating petitions belonged to Democrats – including a former Adler campaign staffer. Reportedly, Steve Ayscue, the paid head of operations for CCDC, and Geoff Mackler, Adler's campaign manager, presented a plan at CCDC Headquarters during a May 26 meeting of the South Jersey Young Democrats, and some of those present soon joined in circulating a petition to place Peter DeStefano on the ballot. Adler denied the allegations. DeStefano called the suggestion that he was a Democratic plant "a bunch of crap". In the end, DeStefano garnered only 1.5% of the vote.

==== Presidential endorsements in 2004 and 2008 ====
On October 7, 2003, the then-State Senator Adler (along with Representative Bill Pascrell of New Jersey's 8th congressional district) formally endorsed Massachusetts Senator John Kerry for President in 2004 and became the co-chairman of his campaign in the state. Shortly afterwards, on December 19, 2003, Governor Jim McGreevey and most of the rest of the New Jersey Democratic Party came out in support of former Governor of Vermont Howard Dean for President. Because of Adler's endorsement of Kerry, and Kerry's decisive win in the Democratic Primary, Adler was rumored to be the frontrunner for U.S. Attorney for New Jersey if Kerry were to win the 2004 presidential election (which he did not).

Similar to in 2004, State Senator Adler was one of the first elected officials in New Jersey to go against the party establishment in his presidential endorsement during the 2008 election cycle. He endorsed Barack Obama for the Democratic presidential nomination when the majority of other New Jersey Democratic politicians supported initial frontrunner Hillary Clinton. Like with Kerry instead of Dean, Obama, who was Adler's choice, would go on to become the Democratic nominee instead of Clinton.

== Personal life ==
Adler met his wife, Shelley (born October 4, 1959, Chicago, Illinois) while at Harvard Law School. He converted to her faith of Judaism in 1985, having been raised an Episcopalian. After the pair graduated, they returned to south Jersey and settled down in Cherry Hill. The Adlers resided in Cherry Hill with their four sons until his death. Shelley is a lawyer and former councilwoman.

In March 2011, Adler contracted a staph infection which resulted in endocarditis, leading to emergency heart surgery. He then died on April 4, 2011. Adler was buried in Locustwood Memorial Park, Cherry Hill Township.

In 2012, Shelley Adler unsuccessfully ran against Runyan for Adler's old U.S. House seat.

== See also ==
- List of Jewish members of the United States Congress

New Jersey Senate
Preceded by Lee B. Laskin	Member of the New Jersey Senate from the 6th district 1992–2009	Succeeded by James Beach
U.S. House of Representatives
Preceded by Jim Saxton	Member of the U.S. House of Representatives from New Jersey's 3rd congressional district 2009–2011	Succeeded by Jon Runyan
