= Louis Greenwald =

Member of the New Jersey General Assembly

Majority Leader of the New Jersey General Assembly
- Incumbent
- Assumed office January 10, 2012
- Preceded by: Joseph Cryan

Member of the New Jersey General Assembly from the 6th district
- Incumbent
- Assumed office January 9, 1996 Serving with Melinda Kane
- Preceded by: Lee Solomon

Personal details
- Born: March 11, 1967 (age 58); Mount Holly, New Jersey, U.S.
- Political party: Democratic
- Spouse: Cynthia
- Children: 3
- Education: Moravian College (BA); Seton Hall University (JD)
- Website: Official website Legislative website

Louis D. Greenwald (born March 11, 1967) is an American attorney and Democratic Party politician, who has represented the 6th Legislative District in the New Jersey General Assembly since taking office on January 9, 1996. He has served as the Assembly Majority Leader since January 10, 2012.

== Early life ==
Raised in Cherry Hill, New Jersey, Greenwald graduated from Cherry Hill High School East, earned a B.A. in 1989 from Moravian College in political science and was awarded a J.D. in 1992 from the Seton Hall University School of Law. Greenwald is the son of the late Maria Barnaby Greenwald, a former Mayor of Cherry Hill Township and a former Camden County Freeholder Director and Surrogate. He lives in Voorhees Township with his wife Cynthia and three children: Lauren, Eric, and Jenna.

== New Jersey Assembly ==
Greenwald was the Assembly's Budget Committee Chair from 2002 to 2012 and was the Assistant Minority Leader from 1998 to 1999. Assemblyman Greenwald is a member of the Camden County Bar Association, the Camden County Democratic Committee and the Camden County Traffic Safety Task Force Committees. He was a member of the CEO/Executive Advisory Board for the Southern New Jersey Council Boy Scouts of America.

=== Committees ===
Committee assignments for the current session are:

- None

=== District 6 ===
Each of the 40 districts in the New Jersey Legislature has one representative in the New Jersey Senate and two members in the New Jersey General Assembly. Representatives from the 6th District for the 2022—2023 Legislative Session are:

- Senator James Beach (D)
- Assemblyman Louis Greenwald (D)
- Assemblywoman Melinda Kane (D)

== Electoral history ==
=== Assembly ===
6th Legislative District General Election, 2023
Party	Candidate	Votes	%
Democratic	Louis D. Greenwald (incumbent)	34,717	35.1
Democratic	Pamela R. Lampitt (incumbent)	34,185	34.6
Republican	Danielle M. Barry	15,067	15.2
Republican	Brian McRory	14,945	15.1
Total votes		98,914	100.0
Democratic hold			

6th Legislative District General Election, 2021
Party	Candidate	Votes	%
Democratic	Louis D. Greenwald (incumbent)	48,497	33.07%
Democratic	Pamela R. Lampitt (incumbent)	47,612	32.46%
Republican	Ed Farmer	25,537	17.41%
Republican	Richard Super	25,015	17.06%
Total votes		146,661	100.0
Democratic hold			

6th Legislative District General Election, 2019
Party	Candidate	Votes	%
Democratic	Louis Greenwald (incumbent)	30,166	34.7%
Democratic	Pamela Lampitt (incumbent)	29,354	33.77%
Republican	Cynthia Plucinski	13,801	15.88%
Republican	John Papeika	13,612	15.66%
Total votes		86,933	100%

New Jersey general election, 2017
Party	Candidate	Votes	%	±%
Democratic	Louis Greenwald	41,767	36.0	▲3.4
Democratic	Pamela Rosen Lampitt	40,291	34.7	▲3.7
Republican	David C. Moy	16,811	14.5	▼2.5
Republican	Winston Extavour	16,335	14.1	▼2.4
American Solidarity	Monica Sohler	821	0.7	N/A
Total votes		'116,025'	'100.0'	

New Jersey general election, 2015
Party	Candidate	Votes	%	±%
Democratic	Louis Greenwald	21,087	32.6	▲1.9
Democratic	Pamela Rosen Lampitt	20,028	31.0	▲2.0
Republican	Holly Tate	11,023	17.0	▼3.5
Republican	Claire H. Gustafson	10,679	16.5	▼3.3
Green	Amanda Davis	985	1.5	N/A
Green	James Bracciante	850	1.3	N/A
Total votes		'64,652'	'100.0'	

New Jersey general election, 2013
Party	Candidate	Votes	%	±%
Democratic	Louis Greenwald	33,232	30.7	▲0.7
Democratic	Pamela Rosen Lampitt	31,366	29.0	▲0.1
Republican	Chris Leone-Zwillinger	22,147	20.5	▼0.2
Republican	George R. Fisher	21,399	19.8	▼0.6
Total votes		'108,144'	'100.0'	

New Jersey general election, 2011
Party	Candidate	Votes	%
Democratic	Louis Greenwald	24,272	30.0
Democratic	Pamela Rosen Lampitt	23,342	28.9
Republican	Allan Richardson	16,714	20.7
Republican	Gregory Horton	16,461	20.4
Total votes		80,789	100.0

New Jersey general election, 2009
Party	Candidate	Votes	%	±%
Democratic	Louis Greenwald	36,446	29.5	▲0.7
Democratic	Pamela Rosen Lampitt	33,320	27.0	▼0.7
Republican	Scot DeCristofaro	27,005	21.9	▲1.4
Republican	Brian Greenberg	26,581	21.5	▲1.8
Total votes		'123,352'	'100.0'	

New Jersey general election, 2007
Party	Candidate	Votes	%	±%
Democratic	Louis Greenwald	23,626	28.8	▼2.5
Democratic	Pamela Rosen Lampitt	22,701	27.7	▼0.9
Republican	JoAnn R. Gurenlian	16,850	20.5	▼0.3
Republican	Bradley L. Mattson	16,199	19.7	▲0.4
Green	Michael Gellman	2,677	3.3	N/A
Total votes		'82,053'	'100.0'	

New Jersey general election, 2005
Party	Candidate	Votes	%	±%
Democratic	Louis Greenwald	38,211	31.3	▲2.5
Democratic	Pamela Rosen Lampitt	34,961	28.6	▲0.2
Republican	JoAnn R. Gurenlian	25,365	20.8	▲1.4
Republican	Marc Fleischner	23,587	19.3	▼0.2
Total votes		'122,124'	'100.0'	

New Jersey general election, 2003
Party	Candidate	Votes	%	±%
Democratic	Louis Greenwald	27,228	28.8	▼3.9
Democratic	Mary Previte	26,798	28.4	▼3.9
Republican	Mark Otto	18,421	19.5	▲1.9
Republican	Joann R. Gurenlian	18,342	19.4	▲2.0
Green	Kevin Madden	1,951	2.1	N/A
Green	Martin Nolan	1,778	1.9	N/A
Total votes		'94,518'	'100.0'	

New Jersey general election, 2001
Party	Candidate	Votes	%
Democratic	Louis Greenwald	38,327	32.7
Democratic	Mary Previte	37,895	32.3
Republican	Anthony "Tony" Clark	20,688	17.6
Republican	Lou Harvey	20,452	17.4
Total votes		117,362	100.0

New Jersey general election, 1999
Party	Candidate	Votes	%	±%
Democratic	Louis Greenwald	23,663	30.1	▲1.1
Democratic	Mary Previte	22,462	28.5	▲0.9
Republican	Robert J. Seltzer	15,505	19.7	▼2.3
Republican	Gerard M. Banmiller	15,293	19.4	▼2.0
Green	Jay Fox	947	1.2	N/A
Independent	Gerard "Gerry" Brigante	852	1.1	N/A
Total votes		'78,722'	'100.0'	

New Jersey general election, 1997
Party	Candidate	Votes	%	±%
Democratic	Louis Greenwald	35,883	29.0	▲2.7
Democratic	Mary Previte	34,105	27.6	▲3.2
Republican	Thomas Shusted Jr.	27,236	22.0	▼2.9
Republican	Susan R. Rose	26,453	21.4	▼3.1
Total votes		'123,677'	'100.0'	

New Jersey general election, 1995
Party	Candidate	Votes	%	±%
Democratic	Louis Greenwald	23,743	26.3	▲3.0
Republican	John A. Rocco	22,520	24.9	▼2.3
Republican	Lee Solomon	22,125	24.5	▼2.5
Democratic	Annette Castiglione-Degan	22,039	24.4	▲1.9
Total votes		'90,427'	'100.0'	

New Jersey General Assembly
Preceded by Lee Solomon	Member of the New Jersey General Assembly from the 6th district 1996–present Served alongside: John A. Rocco, Mary Previte, Pamela Rosen Lampitt, Melinda Kane	Incumbent
Preceded by Joseph Cryan	Majority Leader of the New Jersey General Assembly; 2012–present	Incumbent
