= Main Street Plaza =

Main Street Plaza may refer to:

- Main Street Complex, once known as Main Street Plaza 1000
- Prete Main Street Plaza, Round Rock, Texas, U.S.
