= Parkside, New Jersey =

Parkside, New Jersey may refer to the following places in New Jersey:

- Parkside, Camden
- Parkside, Trenton, New Jersey
