= Har Zion Temple =

Conservative synagogue in Penn Valley, Pennsylvania, United States

Coordinates: 40.0362°N 75.2606°W

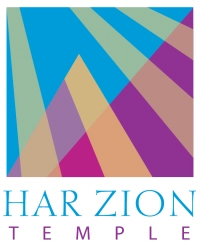

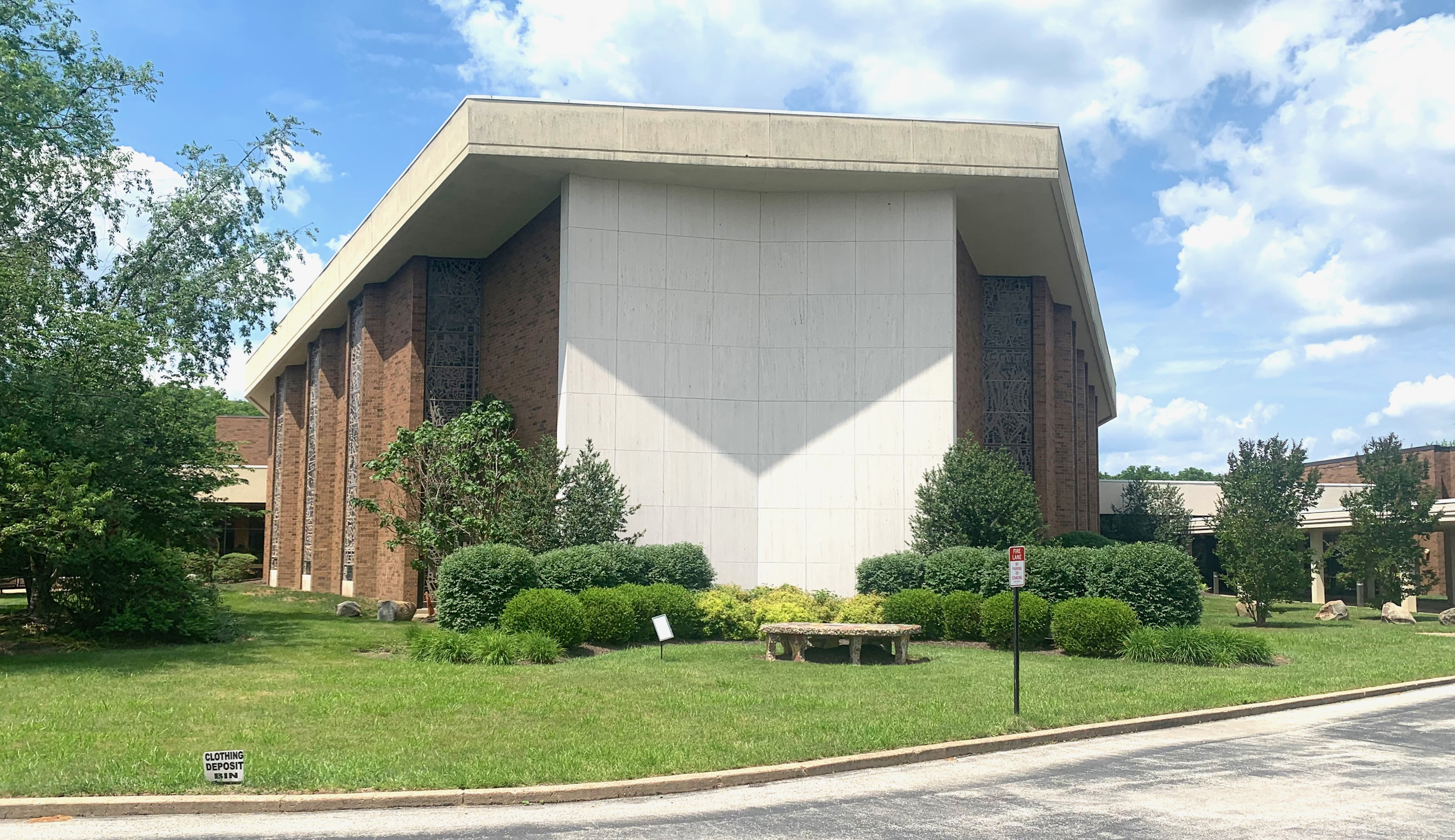
- Har Zion Temple; Hagys Ford Rd, Penn Valley, Pennsylvania (June 2026)
- Formation: 1923
- Founded at: Wynnefield, Philadelphia, Pennsylvania
- Headquarters: 1500 Hagys Ford Rd N, Penn Valley, Pennsylvania
- Members: 700 families (2026)
- Senior Rabbi: Rabbi Seth M. Haaz
- Cantor: Cantor Randy Herman
- Chaplain: Rabbi Ira Flax
- Cantor Emeritus: Cantor Eliot I. Vogel
- Key people: Gary Falk, President, Board of Directors
- Publication: The Bulletin
- Affiliations: United Synagogue of Conservative Judaism
- Website: harziontemple.org

Har Zion Temple is a Conservative synagogue located in Penn Valley, Pennsylvania, United States. Har Zion was founded in 1923 in Philadelphia's Wynnefield neighborhood where it became one of the most influential Conservative synagogues in the country. The congregation moved to Lower Merion in 1976 when it constructed a new campus in Penn Valley. Har Zion today is an active synagogue offering religious services, a preschool, Hebrew school, adult education, and a summer day camp.

== Founding and Wynnefield (1922–1976) ==
In the fall of 1922, a group of Jewish immigrants, most from Russia and Germany, met in the Wynnefield home of Jacob Brodsky to organize a neighborhood congregation. They raised funds door to door and a plot of land was donated by Harry and Phillip Publicker.

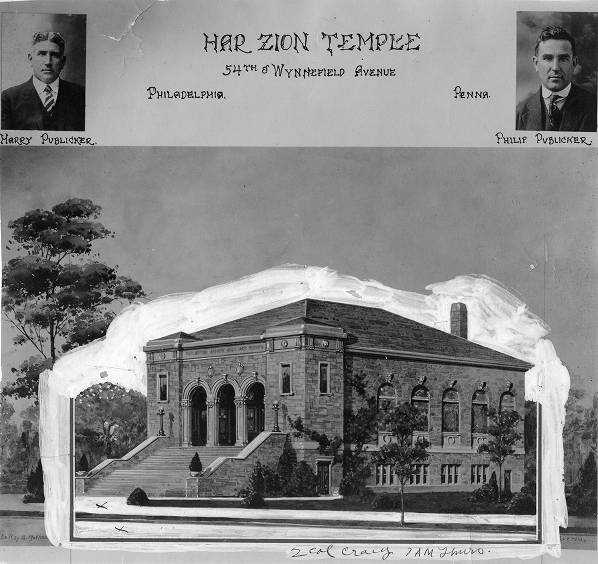
Har Zion Temple, 54th St and Wynnefield Ave; pictured are Publickers who donated land for synagogue (1924)

Har Zion broke ground on its new building on 54th Street near Wynnefield Avenue on February 17, 1924 and laid the cornerstone on April 13, 1924, during a ceremony attended by more than 300 persons. The Publickers officially set the cornerstone, Rabbi Solomon Grayzel delivered the dedication, and Rabbi Bernard Levinthal, dean of Philadelphia's rabbis, was among the dignitaries. Har Zion's membership was 500 at the time. The new building was constructed of stone and designed by architect LeRoy B. Rothschild.

The new Har Zion building was dedicated on September 14, 1924. More than 2,000 attended the ceremony at which Philadelphia Mayor W. Freeland Kendrick delivered remarks. It was the first synagogue built in the Wynnefield neighbor, cost more than US$200,000 (equivalent to $3,757,282 in 2025) to erect, had seating for 800, included eight classrooms and an auditorium, as well as a new organ purchased at a cost of $35,000. Rabbi Charles Sidney presided over the first high holiday services in 1924.

The congregation was active in the wider Jewish community from its earliest days. In 1926, Har Zion entered a basketball team in the Jewish League that played its games at the Young Men's and Young Women's Hebrew Association Hall at Broad and Pine Streets in Center City.

Har Zion hired Rabbi Simon Greenberg who served the congregation from 1925 to 1946. Greenberg was born in Horoshon, Russia in 1901, graduated from the Jewish Theological Seminary in 1919, and studied for a year at the Hebrew University in Jerusalem where he was one of the first American students. At the time of his hire, he was a national leader in Young Judaea. In the synagogue's early years, Greenberg established a nursery, kindergarten, young groups, adult study groups, a Men's Club Adult Institute, Young People's League, and the "Har Zion Bulletin". The synagogue became known for its support of pre-1948 Zionist activity, Hebrew culture, and Conservative movement institutions including the Jewish Theological Seminary in New York. Greenberg was active in municipal and national movements and organizations. He was a founder and director of the Philadelphia Psychiatric Hospital in 1937, president of the Philadelphia chapter of the Zionist Organization of American from 1940 to 1943, and chaired its National Education Committee from 1943 to 1946. Greenberg was president of the Conservative movement's Rabbinic Assembly from 1937 to 1939, giving Har Zion a visible presence in American Jewish life.

The synagogue's Hebrew school outgrew its basement classrooms in 1928 and moved into a nearby building. The community paid off its mortgage in 1930. In October 1937, Har Zion's Men's Club started a volunteer staffed free lending library with 3,000 titles in circulation. On May 21, 1939, more than 1,000 attended the dedication of new entrance doors and memorial windows at which Rabbi Greenberg, Rabbi Levinthal, and Rabbi Judah Goldin all spoke.

The congregation introduced the Har Zion Institute for Adult Education in November 1941 with 200 individuals registered for fifteen courses. The initial instructors included Solomon Grayzel, William Chomsky, and Rabbi Greenberg.

Rabbi David A. Goldstein succeeded Rabbi Greenberg in 1946 and would serve until 1969. Rabbi Goldstein was installed on December 14, 1947, with Jewish Theological Seminary president Dr. Louis Finkelstein delivering the installation address. On September 1, 1949, Rabbi Herman Grossman assumed the position of assistant rabbi for the congregation following 18-months of service as a chaplain at Keesler Field, Biloxi, Mississippi.

On February 11, 1947, a fire that started under the pulpit and spread quickly to the auditorium, destroyed much of the sanctuary's interior including its Torah scrolls and organ, and the stained glass windows buckled in the heat. The 300 Hebrew school students in the building exited and there were no injuries. Damage was estimated at $250,000. Har Zion rebuilt its sanctuary in 1948 under Rabbi Greenberg's leadership with an auditorium, gym, community center, and day school to make Har Zion a model of the American postwar "synagogue center'. Har Zion would grow to 1,800 members under Rabbi Greenberg's stewardship. Greenberg encouraged the synagogue's scholar-in-residence program, welcoming first Nahum Sarna during his tenure at Gratz College in the 1950s and then Chaim Potok from 1959 to 1963.

Har Zion members in general, and Rabbi Goldstein specifically were instrumental in the founding of multiple Philadelphia Jewish organizations and institutions.

Akiba Hebrew Academy was founded in 1946 by a group of individuals, primarily Conservative rabbis, active in the Philadelphia Jewish community, including Har Zion's Rabbi Greenberg. The school utilized the Young Men's and Young Women's Hebrew Association building at Broad and Pine Streets in Center City before moving to the Strawberry Mansion neighborhood. The school moved into Har Zion from 1953 until 1956 when it acquired its own campus across City Line Avenue in Lower Merion at the former Drake-Linden Hall.

Temple Beth Zion synagogue was founded with 80 initial members as an initiative of Har Zion to create a center for Conservative Judaism in Center City, Philadelphia; Har Zion's Benjamin L. Jacobs served as Beth Zion's first president from 1946 to 1950. Land for Camp Ramah in the Poconos was purchased and donated in 1949 by Har Zion member Abe Birnbaum and Rabbi Goldstein was one of the camp's founders.

Philadelphia's Solomon Schechter Day School was started in 1956 under Rabbi Goldstein's leadership and located at Har Zion in Wynnefield until 1970 when it moved to Main Line Reform Temple's school building. Har Zion's Cantor Wall volunteered his services at Schechter from its inception through the 1970s, teaching liturgy and cancelation, and leading services.

The synagogue continued to welcome Jewish leaders and thinkers. Rabbi Abraham Joshua Heschel addressed the synagogue's Men's Club on "Faith of the Ages" on April 28, 1947. Har Zion welcomed Eleanor Roosevelt to speak in 1958.

While serving as Israel's Foreign Minister, Golda Meir was the principal speaker at the synagogue's State of Israel Tribute dinner in June 1960 cosponsored with the city's Israel bond campaign at which $600,000 in Israel development bonds were sold. During her talk, Meir spoke on Israel's recent capture of Adolf Eichmann and reiterated the country's position that he would not be returned to Argentina but tried in Israel. Following Meir's passing in December 1978, Har Zion would hold a memorial service for her attended by Pennsylvania Governor Milton Shapp and Israel's then Counsel General to Philadelphia Asher Naim.

== Penn Valley ==
The Jewish population moved out of the city and into the western suburbs in the 1950s and 1960s. Har Zion established a suburban branch in 1962 when the congregation purchased land at Matsonford and County Line Roads in Radnor for a day camp. By the early 1970s, a branch congregation, Har Zion Radnor, began to meet at the site.

In Wynnefield, membership had dropped to 1,000 by 1969 and enrollment in the Hebrew school to 500 students. In July 1969, a 14-year old was arrested for vandalizing the synagogue building; they broke 100 windows, damaged stained glass windows, and tore books.

In 1969, Rabbi Gerald I. Wolpe succeeded Rabbi Goldstein and served until his retirement in 1999. Wolpe grew up in Boston, served as a chaplain with the Second Marine Division at Camp Lejeune, North Carolina, and held pulpits in Charleston, South Carolina, and at Beth El Temple in Harrisburg prior to Har Zion. Wolpe's father was entertainer Allen Cross, one half of the vaudeville duo, Cross and Dunn. Rabbi Wolpe's children include Rabbi David Wolpe who was eleven years old when his family came to Philadelphia, Rabbi Daniel Wolpe, and Paul Root Wolpe.

Dov Peretz Elkin served as Associate Rabbi from 1970 to 1972.

In November 1970, Rabbi Wolpe and Har Zion presented a Torah scroll to Congregation Adath Emeth Israel, a congregation of Black Jews who met at 616 Woodlawn St in the East Germantown neighborhood of Philadelphia.

In December 1972, the board of directors elected to purchase 75 acres at Hagys Ford and Hollow Roads in Penn Valley. Construction began in 1973, with the official ground breaking taking place on October 10, 1974; the synagogue moved in 1976.

The new building would seat 650 in its sanctuary, and 200 in the Dogole Chapel. The stained-glass windows in the Dogole Chapel were designed by artist Tony Mako in collaboration with Rabbi Wolpe and were inspired by the Mishkan described in Leviticus and the Clouds of Glory evoked in Exodus. The chapel's colors, blue, purple, red, and gold were based on the fabrics adorning the Mishkan.

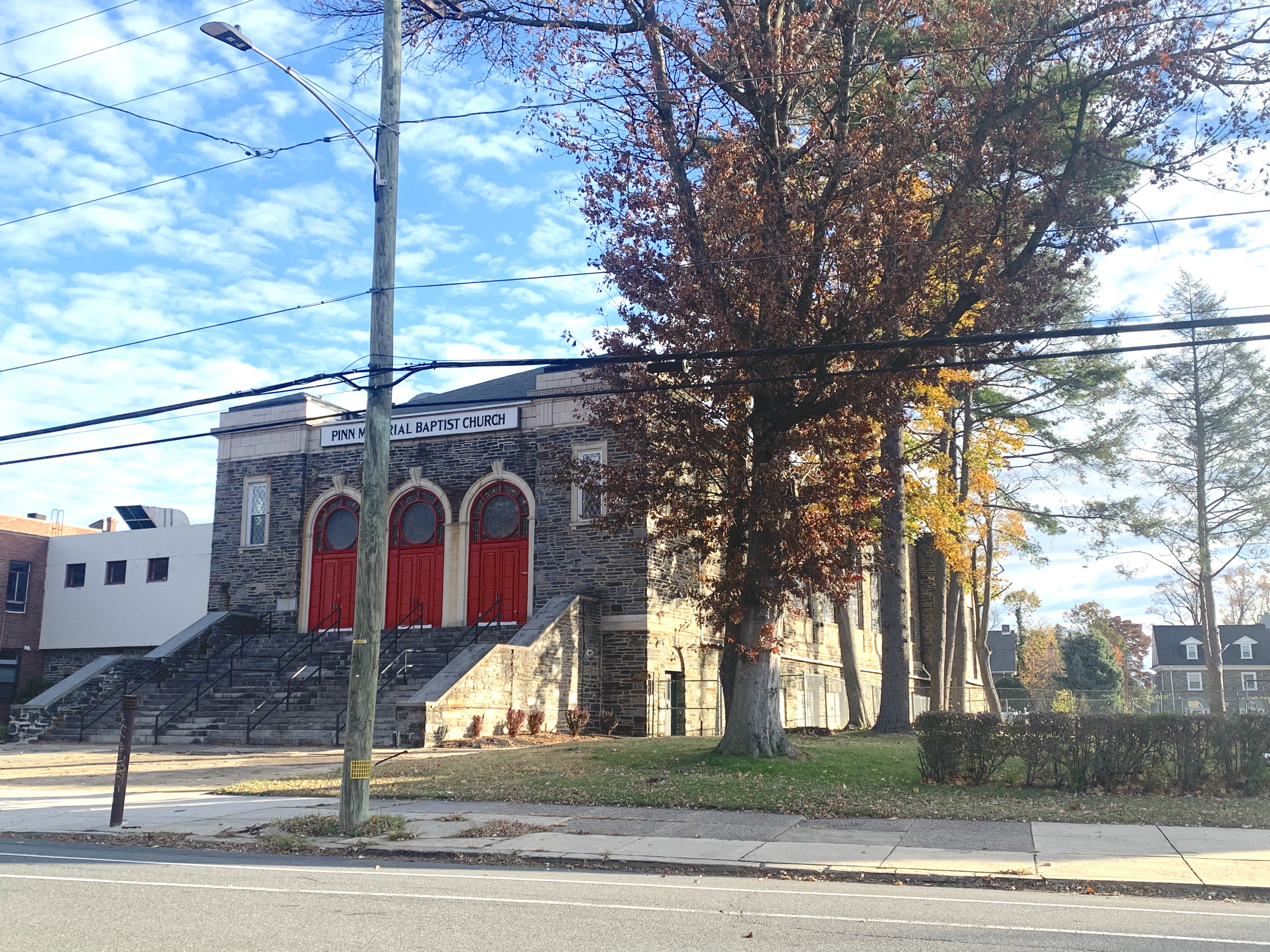
Pinn Memorial Baptist Church, 2251 N 54th St, former Har Zion building (November 2025)

The move out of Wynnefield to the suburbs was opposed by the Jewish Defense League which argued that the synagogue board was leaving Wynnefield out of racism and urged the board to remain the neighborhood and join community efforts to keep the neighborhood integrated and safe. On October 25, 1981, Pinn Memorial Baptist Church voted to purchase the former Har Zion building for $575,000 and began to worship in the space in March 1982.

Rabbi Amy Eilberg was the first woman ordained as a Conservative rabbi by the Jewish Theological Seminary of America in 1985. Following her ordination, she worked in chaplaincy before coming to Har Zion in 1988 as Assistant Rabbi where she served in the role for one year.

Cantor Isaac Wall had come to Har Zion in 1944, was a founder of the Conservative movement's Cantor Assembly, and retired in 1991. He was succeeded by Cantor Eliot Vogel who would serve through 2022. The congregation had 1,450 member families in 1994 when Rabbi Wolpe celebrated his twenty-fifth anniversary in the pulpit. In October 1998, Har Zion celebrated its 75th anniversary. Membership numbered 1,500 families at the time.

Vice President Al Gore spoke at Har Zion in February 1995.

Peter Nero, longtime conductor of the Philly Pops, spoke to the Har Zion High School of Jewish Studies on November 23, 1998. While the program was planned for the students, parents and grandparents turned out among the 125 attendees.

Rabbi Wolpe retired from the pulpit in 1999; he had been only the third rabbi in Har Zion's 75-year history. The search for Rabbi Wolpe's successor became the subject of journalist and congregation member Stephen Fried's, The New Rabbi: A Congregation Searches for Its Leader which would be published by Bantam Books in 1999. While Fried chronicled the synagogue's internal deliberations, the book explored wider social changes in American Judaism including the relationship between clergy, congregant, the synagogue, and wider community.

== 21st century ==
Rabbi Jay Stein was installed as the synagogue's rabbi on April 25, 2004, with Pennsylvania Governor Ed Rendell and Ismar Schorsch, chancellor of the Jewish Theological Seminary speaking at the ceremony.

Senator Arlen Specter was a synagogue member and his funeral was conducted at Har Zion with 1,000 in attendance on October 16, 2012. Vice President Joe Biden spoke, and the ceremony was attended by U.S. Senator Bob Casey, former U.S. Senator Christopher Dodd, as well as U.S. Secretary of Transportation Ray LaHood, Pennsylvania Governor Tom Corbett, and Philadelphia's Mayor Michael Nutter.

Following a nine-month search, Har Zion hired Seth Haaz as senior rabbi who began his service on August 1, 2018. Haaz had grown up in Philadelphia at Beth Sholom in Elkins Park and worked at Camp Ramah Day Camp and Camp Ramah in the Poconos. Prior to Har Zion, Rabbi Haaz served Congregation Adath Israel in Middleton, Connecticut for nine years. Har Zion counted nearly 900 members at the time of Rabbi Haas's hire.

Cantor Vogel retired in 2022 and continued as the congregation's cantor emeritus. Randy Herman was hired and joined Har Zion as cantor in August 2023.

On October 27, 2024, the Jewish Federation of Philadelphia held a memorial for the victims of the October 7, 2023 terror attack in Israel at Har Zion on the Hebrew date identified by Israel for observances.

Har Zion launched a campaign in 2025 to raise $20 million to renovate its sanctuary, chapel, kitchen, and other community spaces, expand programming, and build upon its endowment.

In 2026, the synagogue counts 700 member families in the congregation, more than 2,000 individuals in its community, and had enrolled 170 children and families in its religious school in 2025-2026.
