= Congregation Beth El (Voorhees, New Jersey) =

Conservative Jewish synagogue

- Formation: 1921
- Founded at: Parkside, Camden, New Jersey
- Headquarters: 8000 Main Street
- Location: Voorhees, New Jersey, United States
- Coordinates: 39.867637°N 74.945447°W
- Members: 800 families (2023)
- Senior Rabbi: David Englander
- Cantor: Zahava Fried
- Associate Rabbi: Sam Hollander
- Rabbi Emeritus: Aaron Krupnick
- Board of directors: Jason Whitney (President)
- Publication: Beth El Newsletter
- Affiliations: Conservative Judaism
- Website: bethelsnj.org

Congregation Beth El is a Conservative synagogue located in Voorhees, Camden County, New Jersey, in the United States. The synagogue was founded in 1921 in Camden, New Jersey; moved to Cherry Hill, New Jersey in 1968; and to its current location in 2009. The congregation counted 800 member families in 2023.

== History ==
Congregation Beth El was founded in 1921, in Parkside, Camden, at Park Boulevard and Belleview, opposite Farnham Park. Beth El was formally opened on October 2, 1921 with the first night of Rosh Hashanah. Services were led and the sermon delivered by Rabbi Solomon Grayzel who was contracted for the year while he completed his Phd at Dropsie College across the river in Philadelphia. It was Camden's first conservative synagogue.

The congregation had an annual Chanukah Ball beginning in 1922, a religious school beginning two years later, a Hebrew Free Loan Society, a Hebrew ladies charity society, and in the 1930s hosted sorority and fraternity meetings on Tuesday nights.

Its synagogue building was demolished in 2000, and a Boys and Girls Club was built in its location.

Harry B. Kellman served as rabbi of Beth El from 1947 until 1969. He was succeeded by Rabbi Harold Kahn.

Beth El relocated in 1968 to 2901 W Chapel Avenue in suburban Cherry Hill. The congregation had grown to 625 member families, most of whom had migrated east from Camden to Cherry Hill. Beth El raised more than $1.1 million and retained Harold A. Wagoner and Associates as architects. The new building's sanctuary sat 1,000, which could be expanded to seat 3,000 for high holidays and rose to 75-feet high above street level. Classrooms were built for the religious school which numbered 600 students as well as a chapel seating 90 for weekday services. The auditorium could accommodate up to 600 guests for events. The final building cost would exceed $2 million. William Zorach's sculpture "Memorial to 6,000,000 Jews" (1949) was relocated to the new building.

Congregation Beth El's Rabbi Harry Kellman recruited Rabbi Isaac Furman to run Congregation Beth El's religious school in 1958. During his first year at Beth El, Rabbi Furman started the Beth El Academy Jewish Day School, motivated by the need for a Jewish day school for his own children. The school moved with Beth El to Cherry Hill in 1968 and was renamed the Harry B. Kellman Academy when Rabbi Kellman retired in 1969. The school became independent of Congregation Beth El in 2001. Ahead of Beth El's move to its current location, Kellman Academy moved to it own campus in Voorhees in 2008.

For years a more traditional synagogue affiliated with Conservative Judaism, Beth El elected to conduct egalitarian services and include women's participation in 1996.

In 2009, Beth El sold its Chapel Avenue property to a 2,500-member Christian congregation based in Philadelphia. On April 5, 2009, members of Beth El walked 6½ miles transporting 10 Torahs to the new synagogue in neighboring Voorhees, within the Main Street Complex. With the sale of the Chapel Avenue property, assessed at $9.9 million, the Voorhees campus consists of a 1,200-seat sanctuary, 500-person social hall, coffee bar and administrative offices. The remainder was raised through congregant donations.

== Congregation Beth El Today ==
The Beth El synagogue includes the Early Childcare Center preschool as well as a Religious school for elementary school age children, and hosts several groups, including Sisterhood, Men's Club, Young Families, Habonim (Empty Nesters), Youth Department (Youth groups), Kavod (LGBTQ Adults and Allies), Achim Sheli: My Brothers and Sisters (celebrating ethnic and cultural diversity), and Chevra: Creating Connections for Adults. The synagogue provides religious education for youth and adults.

As of 2026, the synagogue's rabbis are Senior Rabbi David Englander, and Associate Rabbi Sam Hollander who joined the synagogue in 2025. Rabbi Aaron Krupnick first came to Beth El as Associate Rabbi in 1994, was named senior rabbi in 2000, and has served the congregation as Rabbi Emeritus in 2022.

Cantor Alisa Pomerantz-Boro came to Beth El in 2004 and served as the synagogue's Hazzan from 2004 until she stepped down in 2026. After an exhaustive search, Beth El hired Cantor Zahava Fried who began her work with the congregation in July 2026.

The synagogue's Voorhees building sanctuary seats 1,200, and its social hall accommodates 450 tabled guests.
