= Donkey's Place =

Restaurant in Camden, New Jersey, U.S.

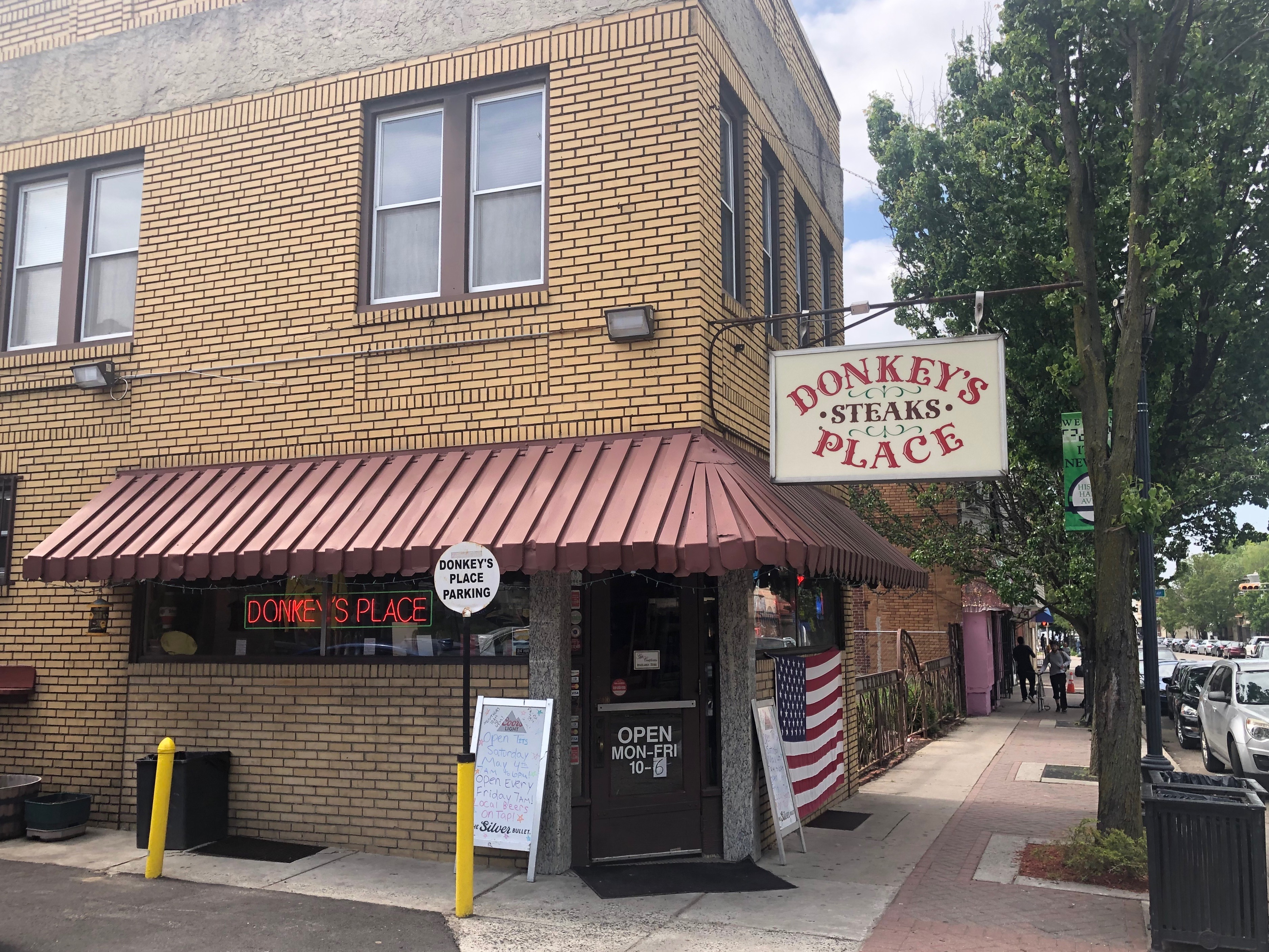
- Interactive map of Donkey's Place

Restaurant information
- Established: 1943; 83 years ago
- Owner: Robert Lucas Jr.
- Previous owners: Leon "Donkey" Lucas; Robert "Bob" Lucas
- Food type: North American cuisine
- Dress code: Casual
- Location: 1223 Haddon Ave, Camden, New Jersey, 08103, United States
- Coordinates: 39.931529°N 75.102333°W
- Website: www.donkeysplace.com

Donkey's Place is a restaurant and bar founded in 1943 in the Parkside neighborhood of Camden, New Jersey, which sells various sandwiches. The deli is known for its hoagies and cheesesteaks.

== History ==
Chick's was founded in 1943 at 1223 Haddon Avenue in Camden by Leon "Donkey" Lucas and his wife. The restaurant has remained in the same location since its establishment. Leon, a former boxer, received the nickname "Donkey" due to his punch being compared to the kick of a mule. Donkey's is known to serve its cheesesteaks on large kaiser rolls instead of long hoagie rolls, and to use white American cheese exclusively rather than giving customers a choice of American, provolone, or Cheez Whiz. Leon died in 1971, ownership of the restaurant passed to his son, Robert A. "Bob" Lucas.

In 2015, Donkey's Place was featured on CNN's Anthony Bourdain: Parts Unknown. Bourdain said Donkey's Place had his favorite cheesesteak and considered it better than cheesesteaks from Philadelphia. Bob died of lung cancer on July 31, 2015. Camden County Freeholder Director Louis Cappelli, said in a statement he "will always be remembered" and "Donkey’s Place is truly an institution in Camden and is beloved by generations of residents". Ownership was passed to his son, Robert Lucas Jr.

== See also ==
- List of submarine sandwich restaurants
