= Neziner Congregation =

Synagogue in South Philadelphia

- Hebrew: אהבת אחים אנשי נזין נוסח הארי
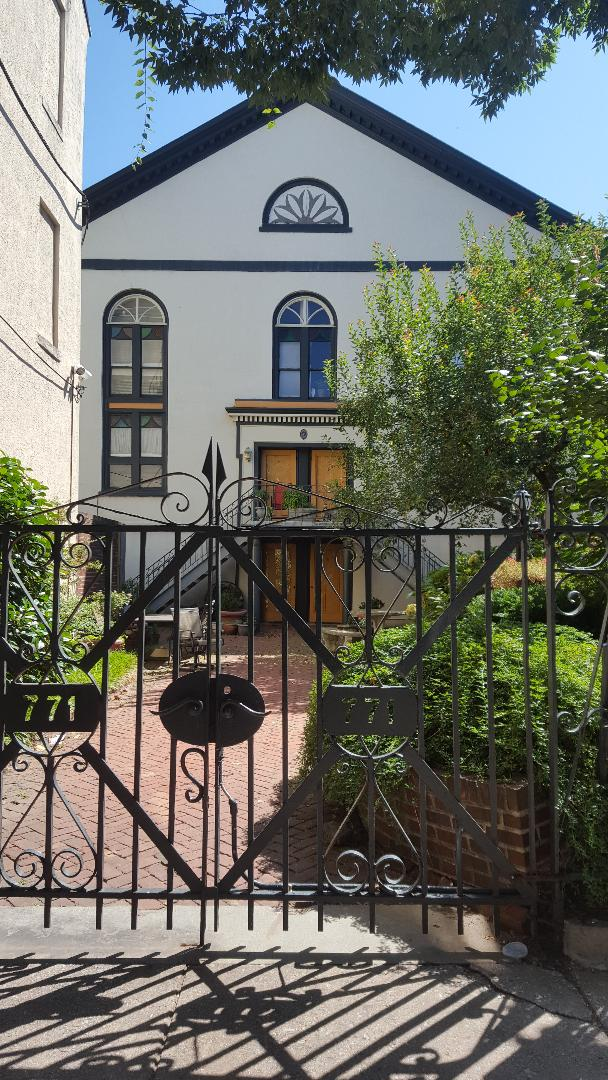
- The former synagogue, now apartment building, in 2019

- Location of the former synagogue in Philadelphia

Religion
- Affiliation: Judaism (former)
- Rite: Nusach Sefard
- Ecclesiastical or organisational status: Church (1811–1905); Synagogue (1905–1984); Condominiums (since 1987)
- Year consecrated: 1811 (Third Baptist Church); 1905 (Neziner Congregation)
- Status: Closed (as a synagogue); Repurposed (residential)

Location
- Location: 771 South 2nd Street, Philadelphia, Pennsylvania
- Country: United States
- Coordinates: 39.942200°N 75.145580°W

Architecture
- Type: Church
- Established: 1896 (as a Jewish congregation)
- Completed: 1811 (as a church); 1905 (as a synagogue)
- Capacity: 800 worshippers

The Neziner Congregation (Hebrew: אהבת אחים אנשי נזין נוסח הארי) was an unaffiliated Jewish congregation and synagogue, located in the Southwark neighborhood of South Philadelphia, Pennsylvania in the United States. The congregation was founded in 1896 by immigrants from the city of Nizhyn, Ukraine who met in members’ homes. The congregation purchased the building at 771 S 2nd Street in 1905 and held services and community events there until 1984 when it closed and merged with Temple Beth Zion-Beth Israel. The building was originally constructed by and was the home the Third Baptist Church and included a congregational burial ground behind the building. Third Baptist sold the building in 1897 to an Independent Polish Church. The former church and synagogue building was repurposed into residential apartments in 1986 which it continues to be in the present day.

== Third Baptist church ==
On August 7, 1809, thirty members of First Baptist Church at Second and Chestnut Streets living in South Philadelphia read a letter at the First Baptist regular business meeting requesting they form a new church to serve the growing community. The first meetings of the new congregation were held in a private home; Rev. John P. Peckworth served as the fist pastor.

On February 23, 1811, the new building at 771 S Second St at Catherine was dedicated by the 126 members of the new community. The building was furnished with plain board benches, sanded floors, and candles for illumination with a wood stove hired during cold weather. It was the first building constructed of stone in Southwark.

The church served as a hospital during the Civil War for Union soldiers returning north. Many died and were buried in the burial ground behind the building.

Third Baptist Church laid the cornerstone for its new building at Broad and Ritner Streets in September 1896 and planned to abandon its building at 2nd and Catherine after 1897. In June 1898, Third Baptist Church sold the property to the First Polish National Society for the sum of $20,000. It was reported that the tract measured 63.1½ by 198.6 feet on the east side of Second Street 169.6 feet north of Catherine.

== Independent Polish Church ==
The congregation of the Polish National Church of the Mother of God was affiliated with the Independent Polish Church and had broken away from St. Stanislaus' Catholic Church in 1897. In November 1899, the church's pastor, Father Vincent Zaleski, was found dying in a pool of blood at the bottom of the stairs of the rectory at 769 S Second St; foul play was suspected but went unproven.

Planning to build a school behind the church, the bodies in Third Baptist Church's graveyard were disinterred in July 1900. It was found that the cemetery included the remains of 1,300 individuals including families stacked with as many as five to seven bodies in graves as deep as twelve to fifteen feet. Some of the dead were removed to Arlington Cemetery.

On December 14, 1899, the Polish societies of the city commemorated the 102nd anniversary of President George Washington's passing with a meeting and parade at the building at Second and Catherine.

== Synagogue ==
Immigrants from Nizhyn, Ukraine organized the congregation in 1889. Nizhyn had a Hasidic Jewish community in the 19th century and is the resting place of the Rabbi Dovber Schneuri, the second rebbe of the Lubavitch Hasidim.

Congregation members purchased the former church building at 771 S 2nd Street in 1905. While never officially affiliating with a Jewish denomination or movement, the congregation generally identified as Conservative by the 1930s.

The congregation was active and had young people's services, drama groups, and girls and boys scouts. Its sisterhood was founded in 1930.

In December 1946, a group of neighborhood boys broke into the synagogue building, set it on fire, and caused $20,000 in damage. In February 1947, vandals broke in through a first floor window, tore out candelabra, chandeliers, and memorial lights, and littered the room with torn prayer books. Peanuts and chewing gum wrappers were found among the debris.

Rabbi Alexander Levin led the shul in 1947.

On December 4, 1949, Neziner celebrated its sixtieth anniversary with a dinner at the Broadwood Hotel. The Touro Synagogue's Rabbi Theodore Lewis as well as Rev. John Craig Roak, rector of Old Swedes Church were the guest speakers.

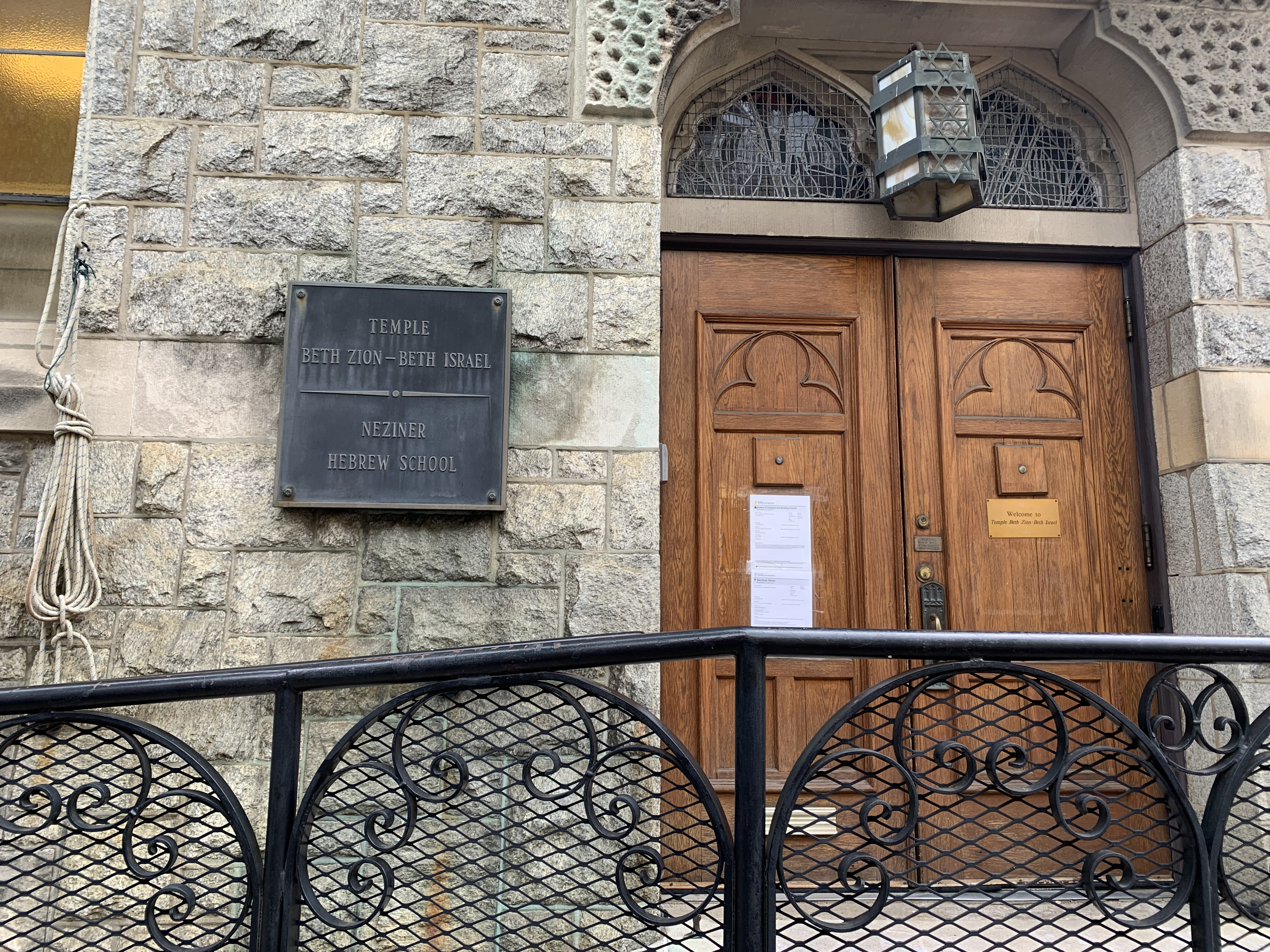
Neziner Hebrew School at BZBI, 300 S 18th, Philadelphia (2023)

Samuel Shore served as Cantor in the 1950s and 1960s for 22 years. Cantor Shore was succeeded by Cantor Abraham Dubow until his passing in December 1972.

Neziner shared an annual brotherhood service with Gloria Dei (Old Swedes') Church. They held one in 1947 and again in 1949. Neziner joined Goria Dei Old Swedes in February 1954 to welcome Governor John S. Fine opening Brotherhood Week. In February 1956, members of Old Swedes attended Neziner for Purim eve services and celebrations, and Neziner attended Old Swedes in support of Brotherhood Week.

The congregation hired Rabbi Saul Wisemon in August 1982 to serve on a part-time basis. Wisemon fled Philadelphia in April 1983 when police searched his apartment for a Torah scroll missing from the synagogue.

The Neziner Congregation closed its doors in 1984 and merged into Temple Beth Zion-Beth Israel, a Conservative synagogue in the Rittenhouse Square neighborhood. Beth Zion-Beth Israel named its youth education program the Neziner Hebrew School.

== Condominiums ==
The former synagogue's building was sold and converted to residential apartments in 1987. The eight available units were each two bedrooms and were offered for sale as early as March 1986 for $124,000 to $129,000 each.

== See also ==
- History of the Jews in Pennsylvania
