= Breezeway =

Semi-outdoor pedestrian walkway

A breezeway is an architectural technique involving a connecting roof and floor between two structures. It provides an aesthetic way for natural ventilation and sunlight to enter buildings and/or homes without compromising the functionality of a passageway.

== History ==
Dogtrot Home

Autrey House Breezeway

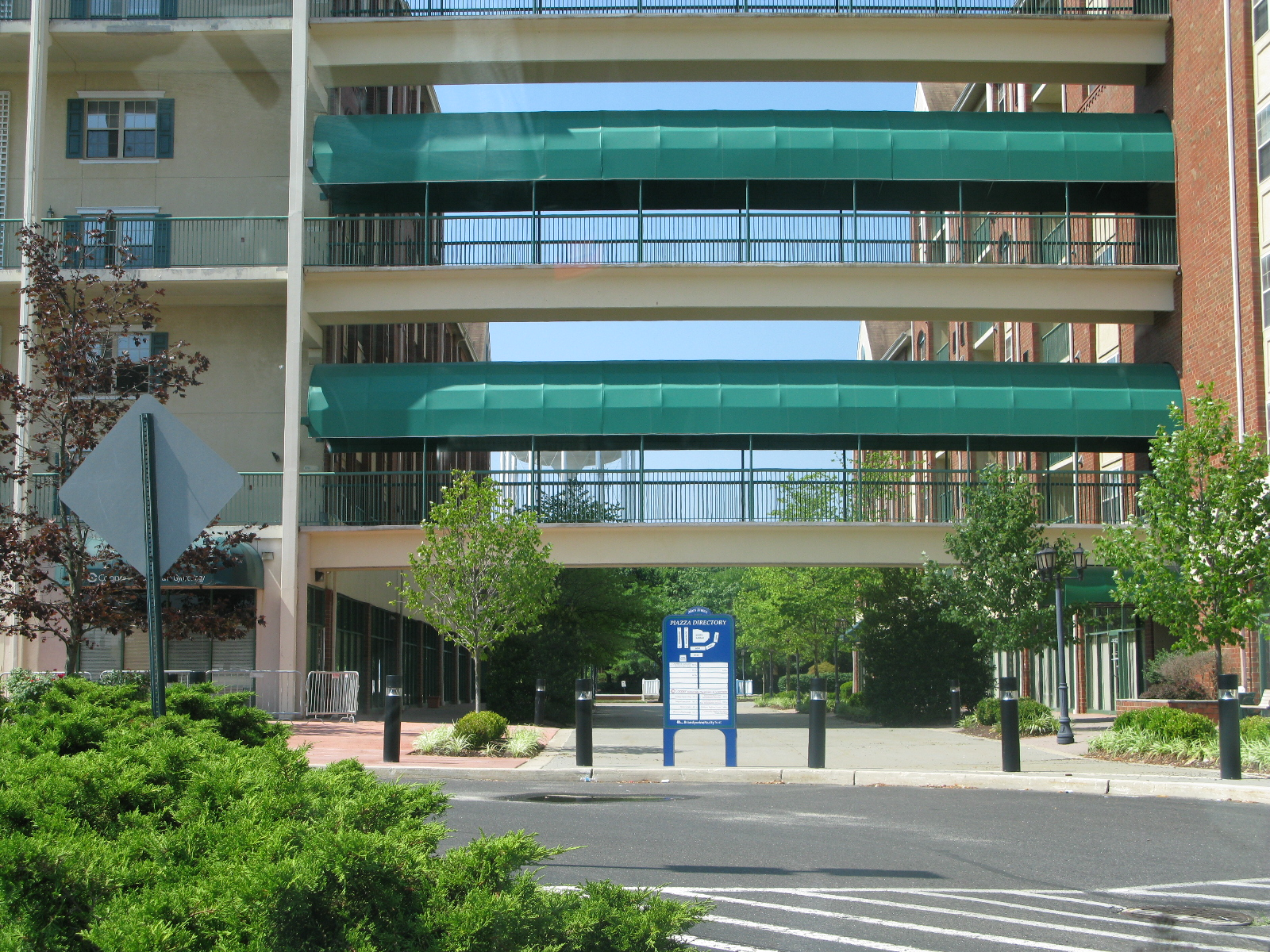
Skyways connecting two buildings of the Main Street Complex in Voorhees, New Jersey

The Romans necessity for functionality and practicality gave way to the development of the Loggia, an open walled gallery or corridor. The loggia introduced the aeration aspect of a breezeway but without the privacy that would later be added from the dogtrot home.

The Dogtrot house rose from a necessity to regulate temperature in the southern United States during the early 1800s. Composed of a single story of log cabin rooms with a central hallway running down the middle.

As privacy and aesthetics became more of a necessity in modern life, architects such as Frank Lloyd Wright began to expand upon the dogtrot. Frank Lloyd Wright's work from 1899-1910 can be described as "Prairie Style", with an open floor plan and long open air hallways.

== Types ==
There are three types of breezeways in residential homes: contained, funneled, and offset.

A contained breezeway runs beneath a gable roof that separates two areas, commonly a garage and a home. This type occurs more in less formal residential homes because of their practical application and function as a roofed area.

A funneled breezeway occurs when a garage and a home are faced towards each other. The accompanying roof allows for some privacy that opens up into a larger backyard or deck area.

An offset breezeway grants access to both the garage and house by being an extension of the house that ends up suspending over an exit of the garage area.

Breezeways are not to be confused with skyways. Breezeways occupy the ground level while skyways are raised, allowing pedestrians to walk above an area that may otherwise be difficult to traverse at the ground level, such as a road.

== Characteristics ==
Breezeways provide a natural ventilation that allows for homes and buildings in warmer climates to reduce their dependence upon mechanical cooling systems, reducing energy costs. They also create an aesthetic viewing feature that connects two places while allowing the user to be shielded from weather that otherwise might disrupt an area susceptible to drastic climate differences.

When a breezeway is implemented improperly, it creates a long walk which compromises passageway surface area to rainfall and probability of slippage. For those considering building a breezeway between garage and home, distance must be considered to ensure safety.

== Examples ==
Hawaiian State Capitol Breezeway

The Breezeway House is a example of an instillation in modern architecture. It uses sliding wooden framed glass doors to open up space, creating natural ventilation and cooling throughout the quarters.

The Hawaiian State Capitol is another example of an open air building that utilizes the breezeway technique. Inspired by local architecture, it allows wind, rain and sun to enter the space. The center of the building remains without walls and a ceiling to let the sunlight reach the floor.

A side-deck is the upper deck outboard of any structure such as a coachroof or doghouse, also called a breezeway.

== See also ==
- Carport
- Pergola
- Skyway
- Transom (architecture)
- Dogtrot
- Skyway
- Loggia
