= Kellman Brown Academy =

Private Jewish day school in Voorhees, New Jersey, United States

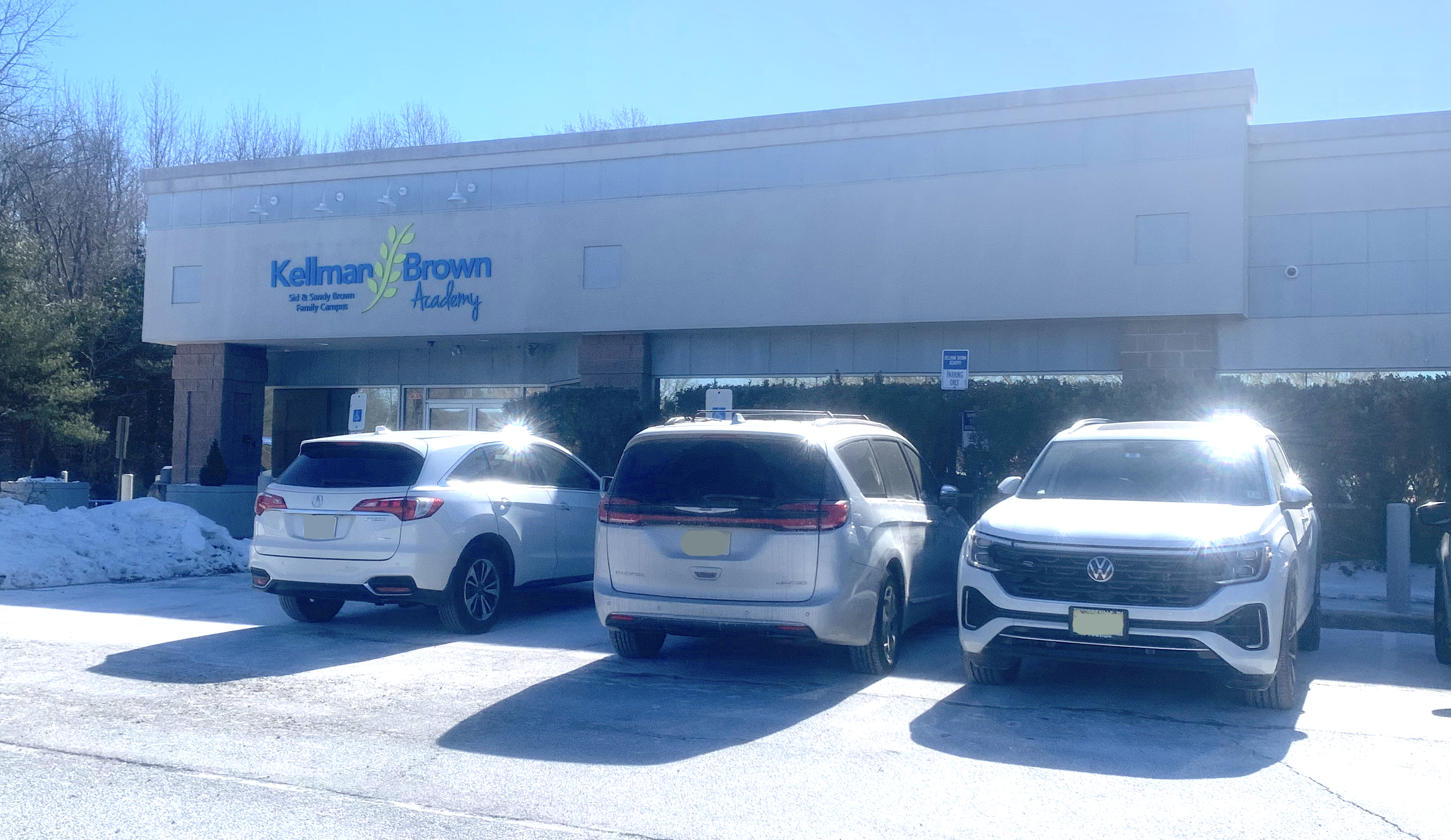
- Kellman Brown Academy in 2026

Location
- 1007 Laurel Oak Road; Voorhees, New Jersey 08043; United States
- 39.842644°N 74.977425°W

Information
- Former name: Beth El Academy Jewish Day School (1959–1968); Harry B. Kellman Academy (1969–2008)
- Type: Private Jewish day school
- Religious affiliation: Jewish
- Denomination: Non-denominational
- Established: 1959; 67 years ago
- Founder: Rabbi Harry B. Kellman
- NCES School ID: 00868305
- President: Jane Lindemann
- Head of school: Rachel Zivic
- Grades: Preschool–8th
- Gender: Coeducational
- Enrollment: 255 (2025–2026)
- Team name: Lions
- Accreditation: New Jersey Association of Independent Schools
- Website: www.kellmanbrownacademy.org

Kellman Brown Academy is a private community Jewish day school in Voorhees, New Jersey serving students from pre-school through eighth grade with 255 students enrolled for the 2025-2026 school year. The school was founded in Camden, New Jersey by Congregation Beth El's Rabbi Harry Kellman in 1959 as the Beth El Academy Jewish Day School; moved with Congregation Beth El to Cherry Hill, New Jersey in 1968 and renamed the Harry B. Kellman Academy; and to its own building in Voorhees, New Jersey in 2008 when it was renamed the Kellman Brown Academy.

== Kellman Brown Academy ==
Congregation Beth El's Rabbi Harry Kellman recruited Rabbi Isaac Furman to run Congregation Beth El's religious school when the synagogue was still in the Parkside neighborhood of Camden, New Jersey. During his first year at Beth El in 1959, Rabbi Furman started the Beth El Academy Jewish Day School, motivated by the need for a Jewish day school for his own children. There were eleven students in the first kindergarten class.

Following the Jewish community out of Camden to Cherry Hill, Beth El purchased ten acres in Delaware Township at 2901 W Chapel Avenue, and moved with the school into its new building in 1968. The school was renamed the Harry B. Kellman Academy when Rabbi Kellman retired in 1969. Rabbi Furman would serve as head of school from 1961 to 1998, and continue as head of school emeritus until his passing in 2020. Marilyn Kopel served as principal in the 1990s.

The school became independent of Congregation Beth El in 2001.

Ahead of Beth El's move to a new facility on Main Street in Voorhees, New Jersey in 2009, Kellman Academy sought its own location and building. Kellman raised $11 million for its relocation. Brothers Sid, Jeff, and Ike Brown were the largest funders of the capital campaign and provided the school with 45,000 square feet of converted office space on 13.5 acres in the Voorhees Corporate Center which was transformed into the school's own building. The new campus featured 22 classrooms, music and art rooms, a media center, computer labs, science labs, gymnasium with bleachers, an all purpose room convertible into a cafeteria or chapel, and athletic fields adjacent to the building. The school was renamed Kellman Brown Academy to honor the Brown family.

Rabbi Moshe Schwartz came to Kellman Brown as head of school in 2010-2011 and served the school through 2015.

Kellman had long been affiliated with the Conservative Movement of Judaism and the Solomon Schechter Day School Association. Following the merger of the Jewish Community Day School Network, the Partnership for Excellence in Jewish Education, Yeshiva University School Partnership, the Schechter Day School Network, and Day Schools of Reform Judaism in 2016, Kellman disaffiliated from a specific Jewish denomination to become a community Jewish day school. At the time, Kellman enrollment was 190 students.

Kellman Brown and the community celebrated the school's sixtieth year in May 2018 at Congregation Beth El. Ahead of the 2018-2019 school year, Kellman opened the Sarah Samson Jewish Community JSTEM lab to focus on Jewish learning incorporating science, technology, engineering, and math.

Kellman Brown became an agency of the Jewish Federation of Southern New Jersey in 2024 to benefit from the Jewish Federation's support in marketing, administration, and operations. Kellman enrollment was 235 during the 2024-2025 school year.

The school provides students with a dual secular and Jewish curriculum. Kellman eighth-graders travel to Israel as a capstone of their middle school and Kellman education.

Kellman Brown's day care and preschool had grown to 66 students by 2026, and in April 2026 the school announced that it would partner with Camp Gan Israel to extend its preschool program through the summer.
