= Temple Beth Zion-Beth Israel =

Conservative synagogue in Philadelphia

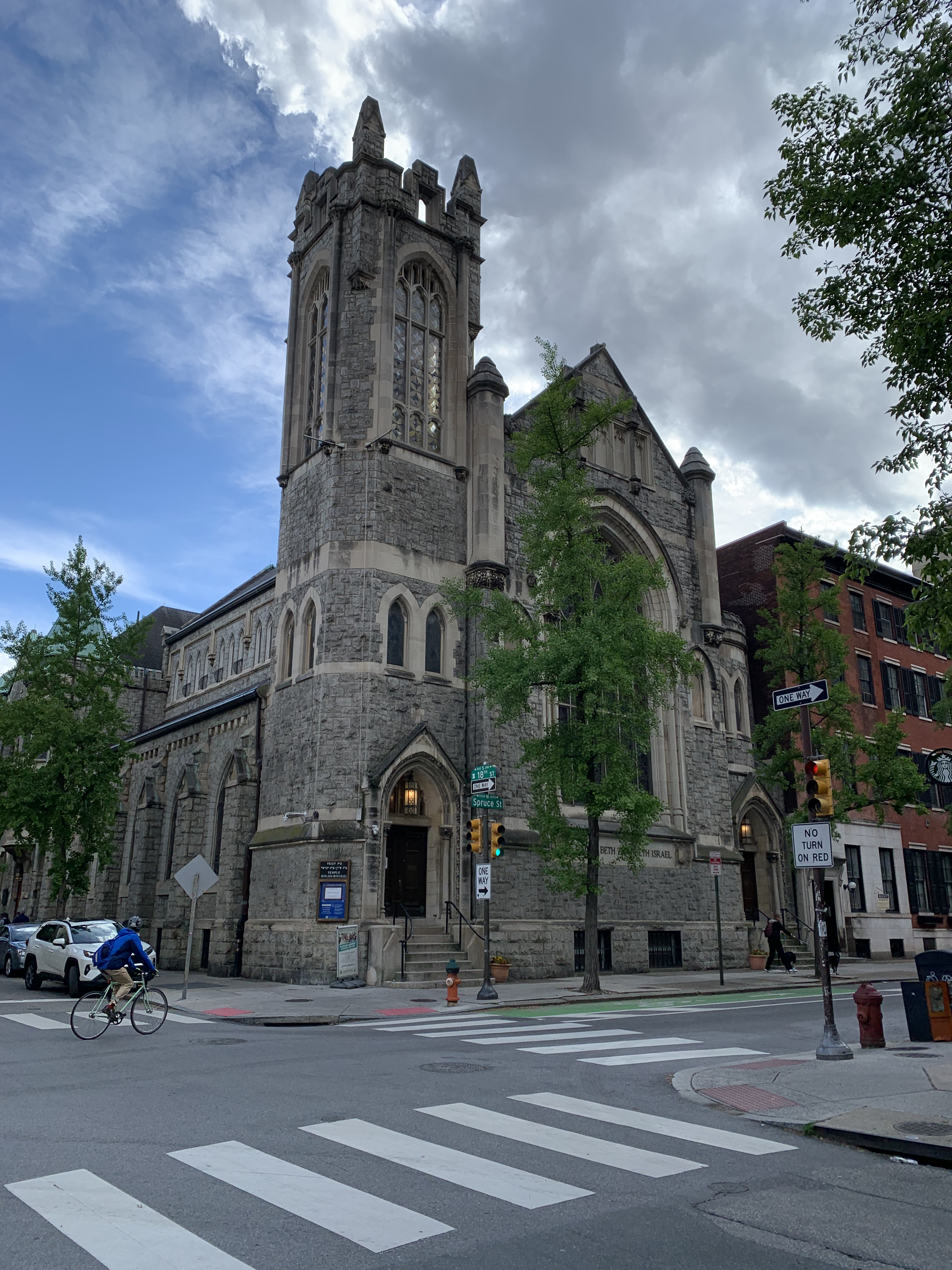
- Temple Beth Zion-Beth Israel, May 2023

- Location in Philadelphia

Religion
- Affiliation: Conservative Judaism
- Ecclesiastical or organizational status: Synagogue
- Leadership: Rabbi Annie Lewis (Senior); Rabbi Kenneth Stern (Interim); Rabbi Ira F. Stone (Emeritus)
- Status: Active

Location
- Location: 300 S 18th St, Philadelphia, Pennsylvania 19103
- Country: United States
- Interactive map of Temple Beth Zion-Beth Israel
- Coordinates: 39°56′51″N 75°10′17″W

Architecture
- Architects: Thomas Preston Lonsdale (1894); Beryl Price (1953)
- Type: Synagogue
- Style: Neo-Gothic
- Established: 1946 (Beth Zion); 1840 (Beth Israel); 1964 (merger)
- Completed: 1894 (as a church); 1953 (as a synagogue)

Website
- www.bzbi.org

Temple Beth Zion-Beth Israel is a Conservative synagogue in the Center City of Philadelphia, Pennsylvania, United States. Its congregation was formed through the 1964 merger of Beth Zion, which was created in 1946, and Beth Israel, which was established in 1840. Temple Beth Zion-Beth Israel had 400 member households as of December 2022. The synagogue offers religious services, pre-school, Hebrew school, adult education, and community programming.

== Temple Beth Zion (1946) ==
Temple Beth Zion was founded with 80 initial members as an initiative of Har Zion Temple (then located in the Wynnefield neighborhood) to create a center for Conservative Judaism in Center City, Philadelphia. Benjamin L. Jacobs was the new synagogue's first president from 1946 to 1950.

Beth Zion held its first services on October 9, 1946, the first night of the festival of Sukkot, in the rooftop garden of the Young Men's Hebrew Association at Broad and Pine Streets. The services were led by Rabbi Moshe Davis.

Beth Zion acquired the Lit mansion at 320 S 19th St in 1946 and transformed the building into its synagogue. The membership increased to 250 by June 1947. Rabbi Benjamin Tumin led Beth Zion from 1947 to 1948 and Rabbi Yaacov Rosenberg succeeded him from 1948 to 1955.

Beth Zion purchased its current building at 18th and Spruce Streets in August 1953 from the Temple Seventh Day Adventist Church. The neo-gothic stone building had been designed by Thomas Preston Lonsdale and constructed in 1894 as the Methodist Episcopal Church of the Covenant. Architect Beryl Price transformed the church interior into a synagogue sanctuary with stained glass windows by Vincent Filipino.

Yaakov G. Rosenberg was serving as rabbi in 1954 and Asher Mandelblatt as cantor. Rabbi Reuben Magil came to the synagogue in 1955.

== Temple Beth Israel (1840) ==
Temple Beth Israel was founded in 1840 to serve German and Polish Jewish immigrants. It was the third synagogue in Philadelphia after Congregation Mikveh Israel and Rodeph Shalom. The congregation first met at Adelphi Court and built a new synagogue in the Egyptian Revival style in 1849 on N 8th Street south of Jefferson. The building was dedicated on March 29, 1849.

Samuel E. Cohen Noot was Beth Israel's first leader. Gabriel Pape succeeded Noot and served as rabbi until his death in 1872. Rabbi Marvin Nathan became Beth Israel's rabbi in 1905 and served for more than 30 years. Temple Beth Israel was a founding member of the United Synagogue of Conservative Judaism in 1913.

Beth Israel was the first synagogue in the Strawberry Mansion neighborhood when the congregation moved from Eighth and Jefferson to 32nd and Montgomery Streets in 1908. In 1913, a real estate broker placed an ad in the Philadelphia Jewish Herald encouraging Jews to leave South Philadelphia's Jewish quarter and move to the “fresh air” and “beautiful country landscape” of Strawberry Mansion.

Beth Israel's building was designed by Frank Hahn and stood at 1806 North 32nd Street. The interior galleries were inspired by the Keneseth Israel synagogue building at Broad and Montgomery Streets. The building's dome had a 50-foot circumference and reached 80 feet above street level.

The new synagogue cost more than $100,000 and was dedicated on February 9, 1908. Congregation Adath Jeshurun's rabbi, Rev Dr JH Landau spoke at the dedication, as did Keneseth Israel's Joseph Krauskopf, and Beth Israel's rabbi Marvin Nathan.

Gedaliah Sheinfeld, born in Vachnovka, Russia in 1892, served as Beth Israel's cantor from 1922 until 1957.

Abraham Ezra Milligram served as rabbi from 1930 to 1940; he edited the Beth Israel Hymnal (1937) containing supplemental hymns, readings, and a memorial service.

Beth Israel sold the Strawberry Mansion building in 1957, and met at the Greenbrier Country Club in Wynnefield Heights until 1963.

== Beth Zion-Beth Israel (BZBI) (1964-present) ==
Beth Israel merged with Beth Zion in 1964 and moved into the Center City synagogue.

On October 22, 1965, Temple Beth Zion-Beth Israel would hold a special Friday night service to mark the 125th anniversary of Beth Israel.

Rabbi Herbert Rosenbaum was the synagogue's rabbi from 1981 to 1983.

Rabbi David Silverman came to lead the synagogue in November 1983 when it counted 900 members.

The Neziner Congregation in Philadelphia's Queen Village neighborhood closed in 1984 and merged into Beth Zion-Beth Israel. Beth Zion-Beth Israel named its youth education program the Neziner Hebrew School.

Rabbi Ira F. Stone came to Beth Zion-Beth Israel in 1988 and served as senior rabbi until 2015. Rabbi Stone continues to serve the congregation as rabbi emeritus.

Rabbi Ezekiel Nissim Musleah, born in Kolkata in 1927, served as the synagogue's Torah reader and instructor from 1990 until his passing in 2020. Following his retirement from Har Zion in 1999, Rabbi Gerald Wolpe lived in Center City and was a member at Beth Zion Beth Israel until his passing in May 2009.

Cantor George Mordechai served the synagogue from 2000 to 2004. Cantor Sharon Grainer came to Beth Zion-Beth Israel in 2006 and served in the role until 2017.

The congregation engaged in a capital campaign between 2005 and 2009 to update the building's air conditioning systems, fire alarm system, electrical wiring, and complete the building's water-management system.

Rabbi Yosef Goldman was hired in 2014 and until 2021 was assistant rabbi and Director of Sacred Music to expand the music program.

The synagogue hired Rabbi Abe Friedman as senior rabbi to succeed Rabbi Stone in 2015. Rabbi Friedman is a graduate of the Ziegler School of Rabbinic Studies and had previously served as rabbi of Anshe Emet Synagogue in Chicago.

Rabbi Abi Weber was the synagogue's Assistant Rabbi from 2021 until 2026.

Rabbi Friedman departed the synagogue in 2025. The congregation was served by interim rabbi Kennth Stern as it commenced a search for a permanent senior rabbi. Rabbi Annie Lewis had served as the congregation's associate rabbi from 2019 to 2021. In June 2026, Rabbi Lewis returned to Beth Zion-Beth Israel as senior leader. Rabbi Stern is continuing full time as interim rabbi before transitioning to a part time role. The congregation currently has 400 member families.

== Gallery ==
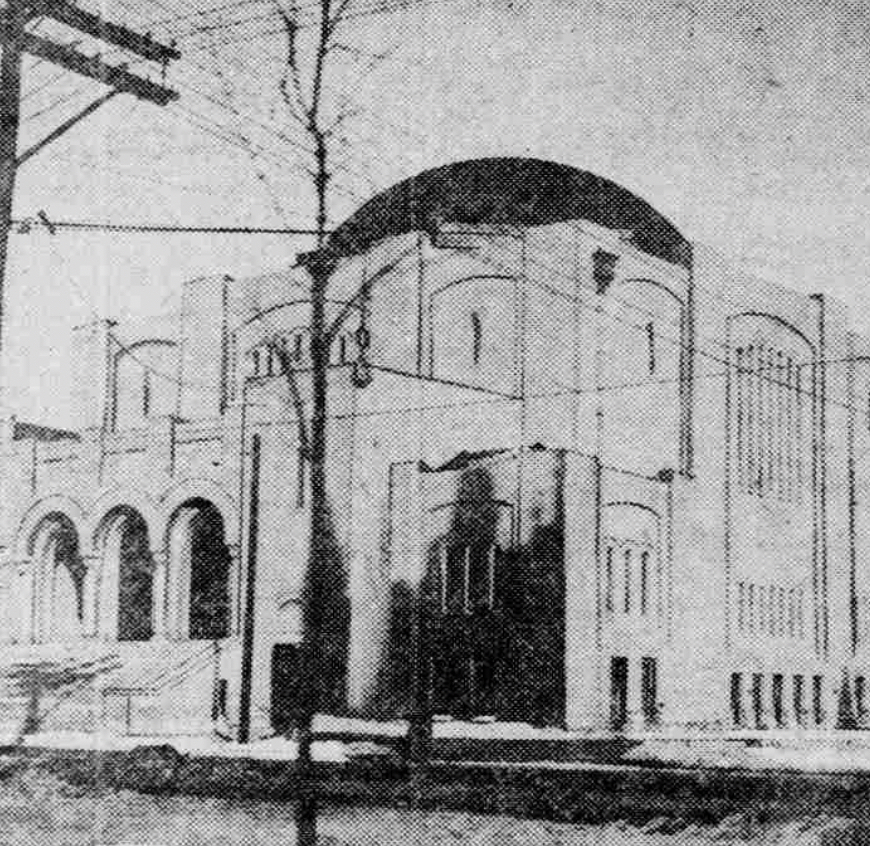
Beth Israel's building at 32nd St/Montgomery Ave was dedicated February 9, 1908

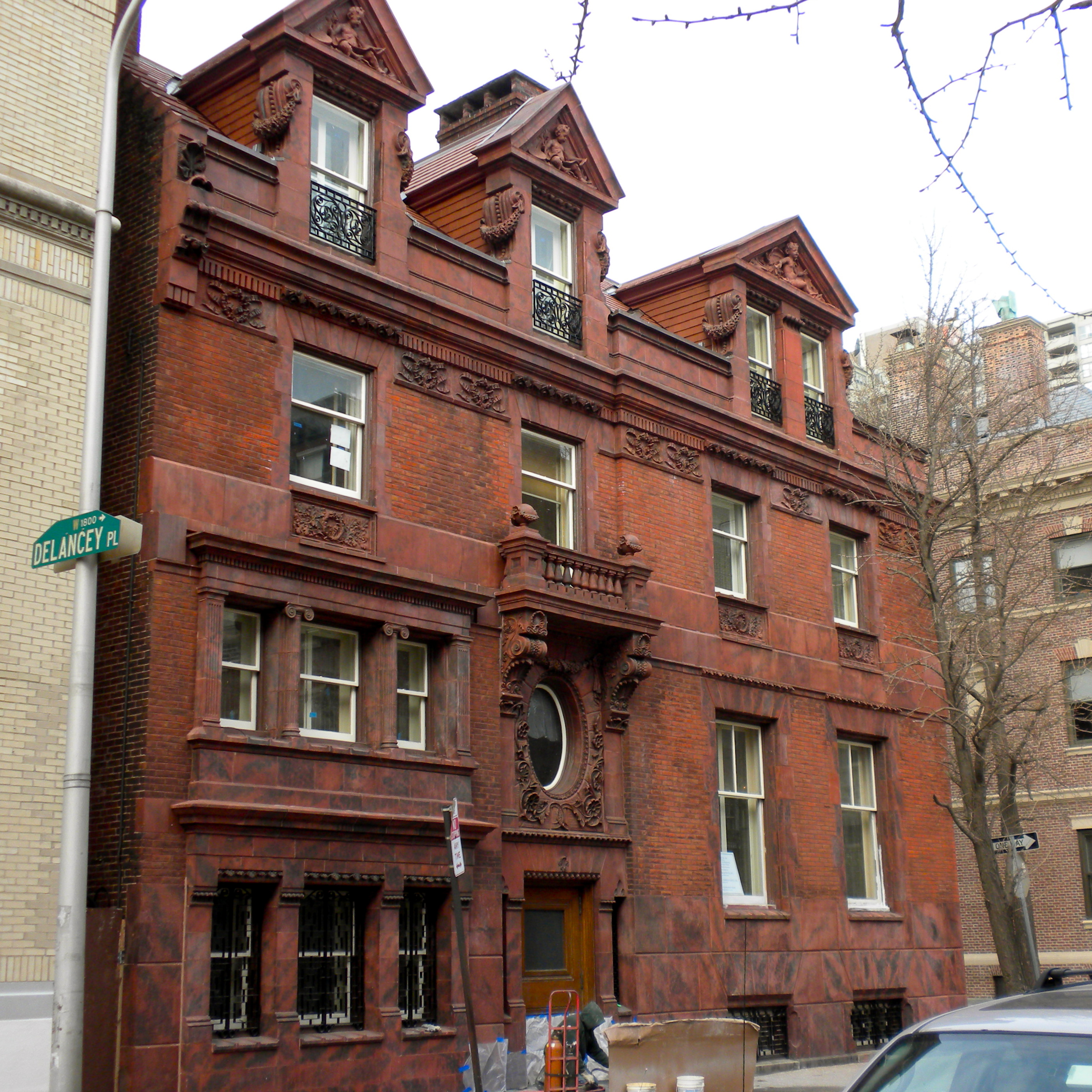
320 S 19th St was home to Temple Beth Zion from 1946 to 1953

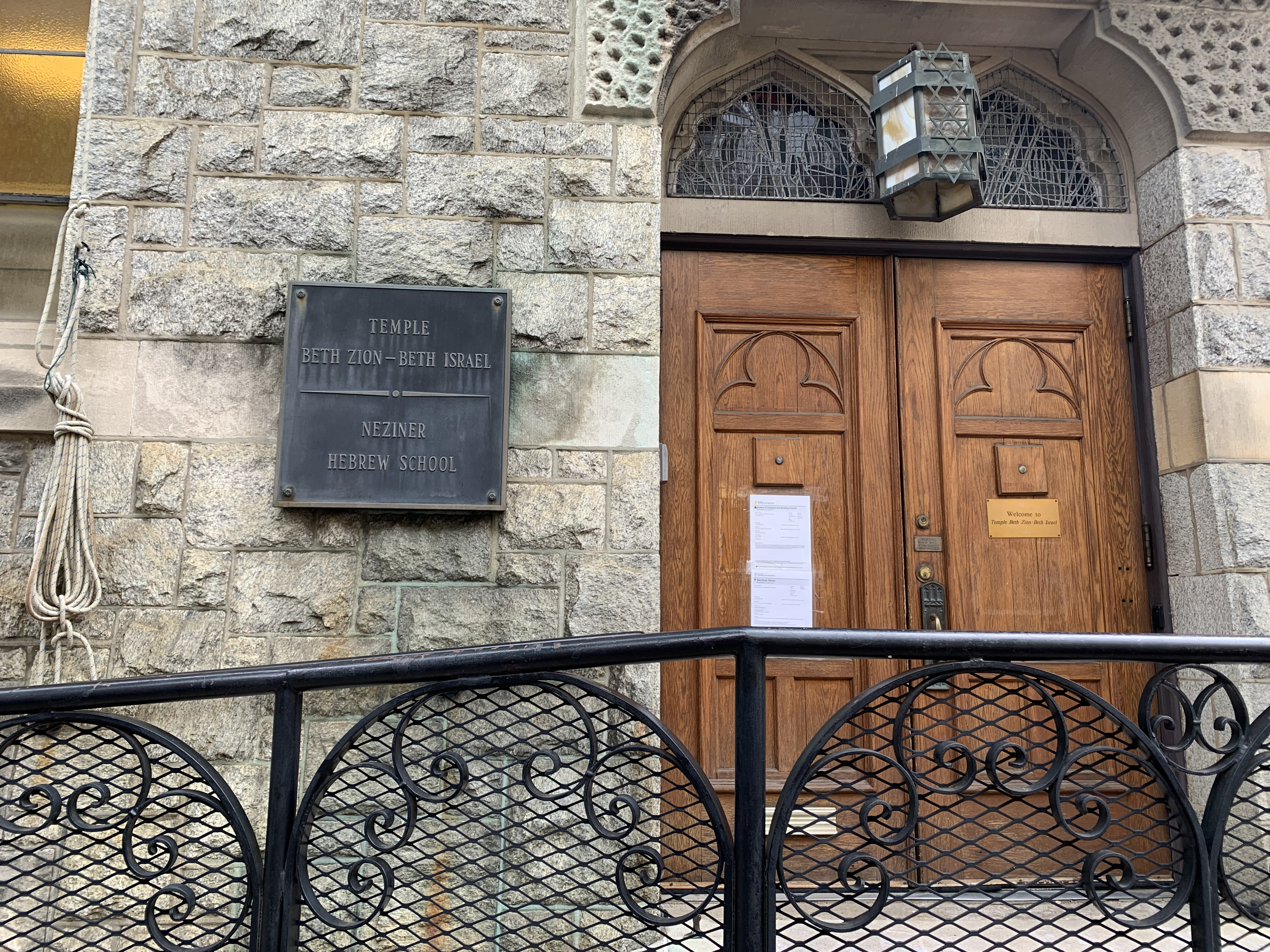
Temple Beth Zion-Beth Israel and the Neziner Hebrew School, 300 S 18th St, Philadelphia

== See also ==
- History of Jews in Philadelphia
