= Solomon Grayzel =

American historian

- Born: February 18, 1896; Minsk, Russia
- Died: August 12, 1980 (aged 84)
- Education: City College of New York (B.A.); Columbia University (M.A.); Jewish Theological Seminary of America; Dropsie College (Ph.D.)
- Occupations: Historian, rabbi, editor
- Employer(s): Gratz College; Jewish Publication Society
- Known for: Research on Church–Jewish relations; Editor of the Jewish Publication Society; Author of The Church and the Jews in the 13th Century
- Notable work: The Church and the Jews in the 13th Century (1933); A History of the Jews (1947); History of Contemporary Jews (1960)
- Title: Editor, Jewish Publication Society (1939–1966)
- Spouse: Sophie Solomon (m. 1932–1980)

Solomon Grayzel (February 18, 1896 – August 12, 1980) was an American rabbi and Jewish historian who testified as an expert witness in Abington School District v. Schempp, the case that declared school-sponsored Bible reading in American public schools to be unconstitutional. Among other topics, his scholarly research focused on the relationship between the Vatican and the Jews, including A History of the Jews, The Church and the Jews in the XIIIth Century, and other scholarly essays and books on the topic.

Grayzel was born on February 18, 1896, in Minsk, Belarus, then part of the Russian empire. He emigrated to the United States as an adolescent, settling in the Brownsville section of Brooklyn, New York, with his family in 1908.

Grayzel received a Bachelor of Arts degree from the City College of New York in 1917 and a Master of Arts degree in sociology from Columbia University in 1920. He received his semikhah (rabbinical ordination) from the Conservative Movement at the Jewish Theological Seminary of America in 1921, and earned a Ph.D. in history from Dropsie College in Philadelphia in 1926.

While working on his doctorate, Grayzel took his first and only full-time pulpit position at Congregation Beth El in Camden, New Jersey where he was the congregation's first rabbi when the new synagogue opened. He was the editor-in-chief of the Jewish Publication Society from 1939 to 1966.
