= Main Street Complex =

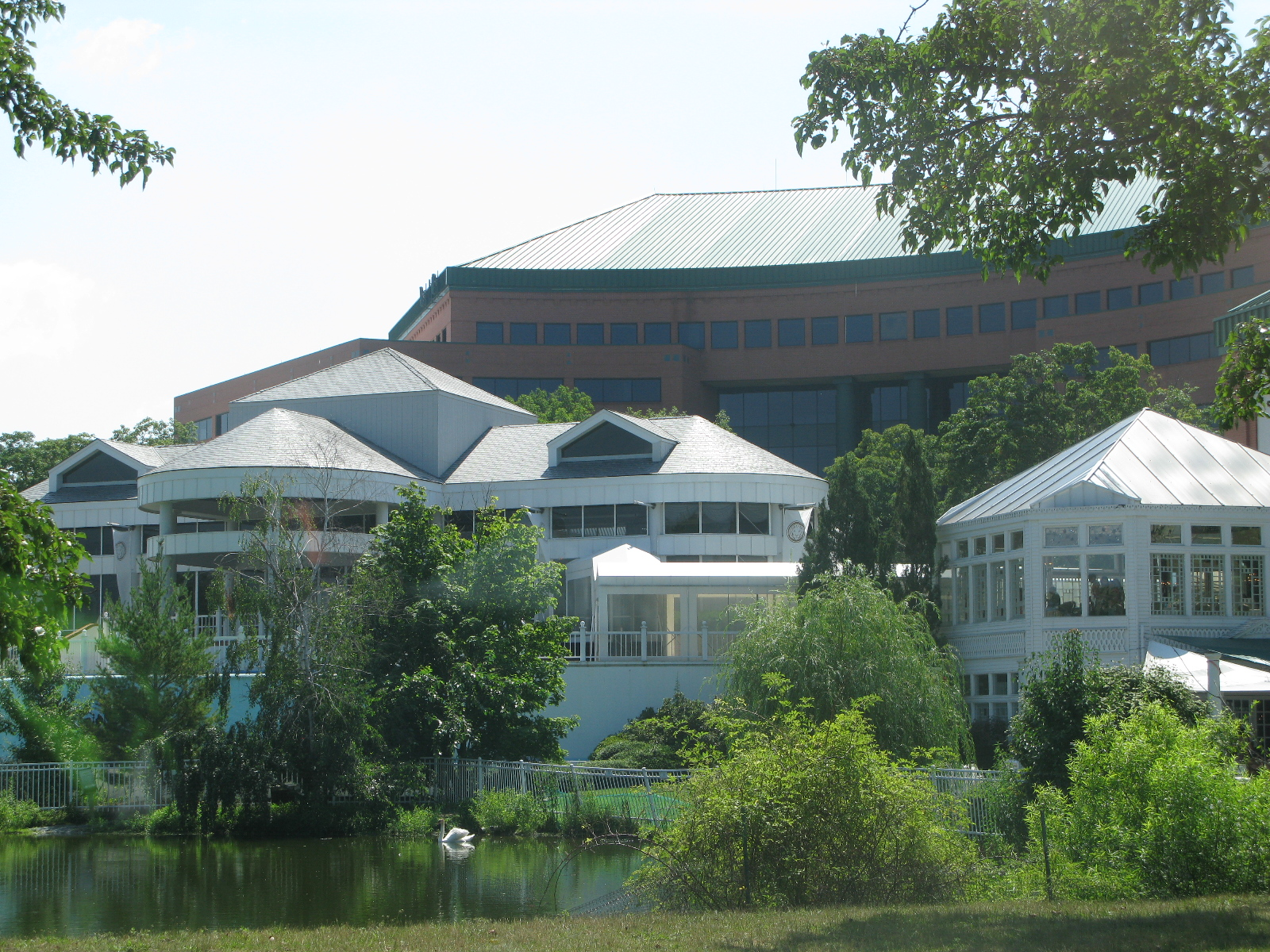
- Main Street Complex (The Mansion in foreground; Main Street offices in background)
- Location: Voorhees, New Jersey, U.S.
- Coordinates: 39.86512°N 74.94658°W
- Opened: September 30, 1988
- Developer: John B. Canuso
- Owner: Brandywine Realty Trust
- Parking: 2 parking garages parking lots
- Public transit: NJ Transit bus: 451

The Voorhees Main Street Complex (also known as the Voorhees Complex, Main Street Complex, or simply Main Street) is a shopping center, banquet hall, residential, medical and business complex located in Voorhees, New Jersey, United States. It was developed by John B. Canuso, a South Jersey developer.

== History ==
The first phase of the Main Street Complex was built in 1988 with the entire project costing $200 million. It was designed to serve as a marketplace and town center for Voorhees. It was built on 167 acres (0.68 km^{2}), which included a 162,000-square-foot (15,100 m^{2}) business complex. This became known as Main Street Plaza 1000. Another business complex, known as Main Street Piazza, was established in 1990. Restaurants, exclusive shops, open gardens, and condominiums were also soon developed. The Radnor Corporation, which was Canuso's partnership for the project, took control of the complex in 1994. In 1997, Radnor Corp. sold the complex to Brandywine Realty Trust for $21.5 million. In October 1988, former President Ronald Reagan made a campaign stop at the complex.

== Facilities ==
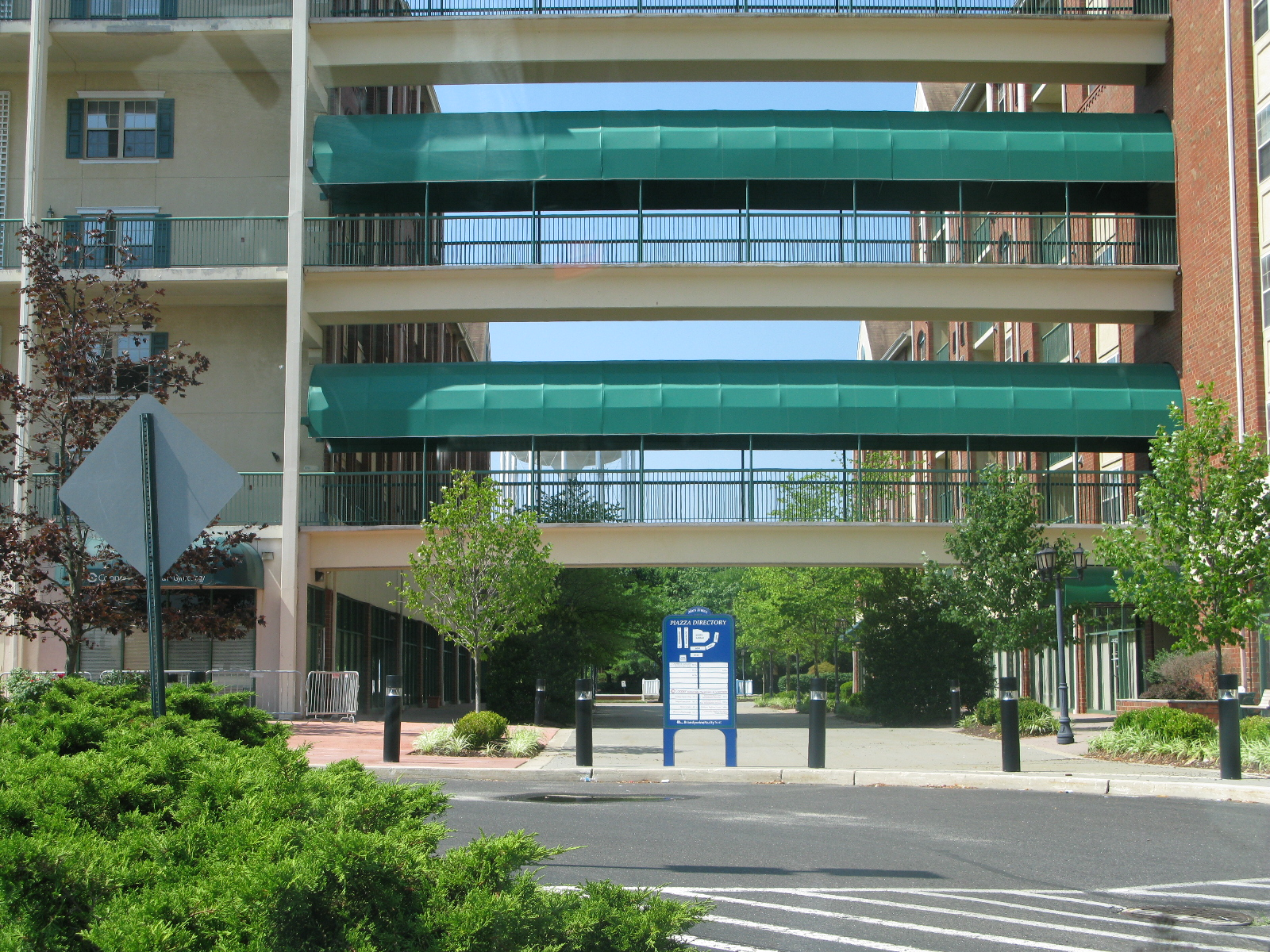
An elevated breezeway in Main Street Complex

The Main Street Complex is located on Main Street (namesake for the complex) and Kresson Road, between Evesham Road (County Route 544) and Centennial Boulevard in Voorhees, New Jersey. The largest amenity on the site is the Cooper Health System (formerly occupied by the West Jersey Heath System, currently known as Virtua), which consists of several medical offices. Directly above some of the medical offices are condominiums. Catelli Italian Restaurant was a restaurant that opened in 1994 and closed on July 24, 2011. The Main Street Pub was the longest running restaurant at the complex, which opened in 1992 and closed its doors in 2014. The Mansion is a catering facility with several banquet rooms. Since its opening in 1990, The Mansion hosts weddings, conferences, bar and bat mitzvahs, and other special events. The Chamber of Commerce Southern New Jersey, a large business organization for the region, has its headquarters at Main Street. A playground was built in 1993, at a cost of $70,000, but was removed in 2010 due to safety concerns.

CVS Pharmacy and the Congregation Beth El synagogue are free-standing buildings on the property of Main Street.

== See also ==
- The Promenade at Sagemore
- Voorhees Town Center
