= Prete Main Street Plaza =

Public square in Round Rock, Texas, U.S.

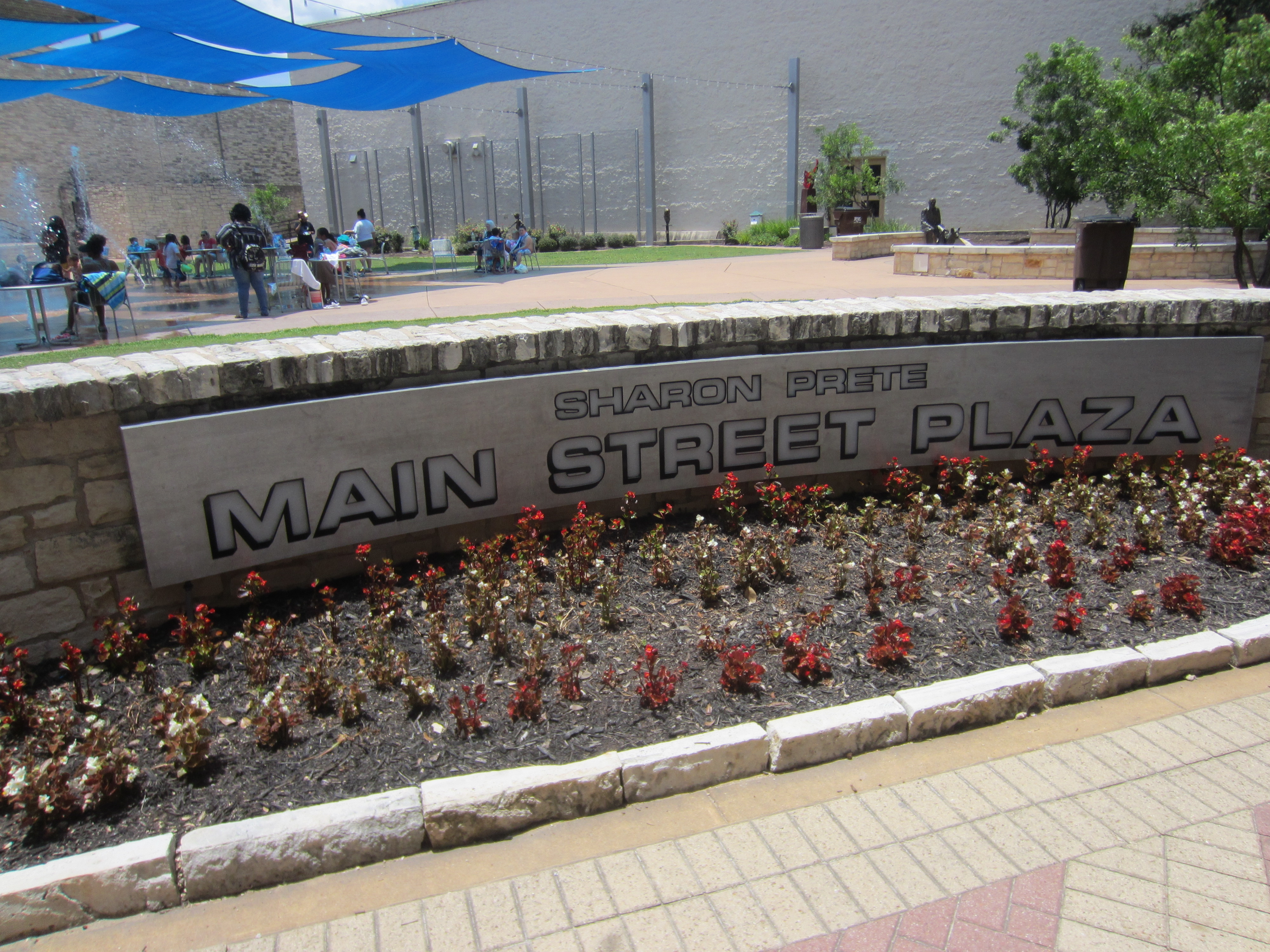
- Sign for the plaza, 2021
- Location: Round Rock, Texas, U.S.
- Location within Texas
- Coordinates: 30°30′31″N 97°40′38″W

Sharon Prete Main Street Plaza (also known as Main Street Plaza, Prete Main Street Plaza, and Prete Plaza) is a public square with a fountain in Round Rock, Texas, United States.

The plaza hosts the city-sponsored Music on Main concert series. Dale Watson was featured in 2021, following a break in the series because of the COVID-19 pandemic. The site has also hosted the Frontier Days festival and Movies in the Park.

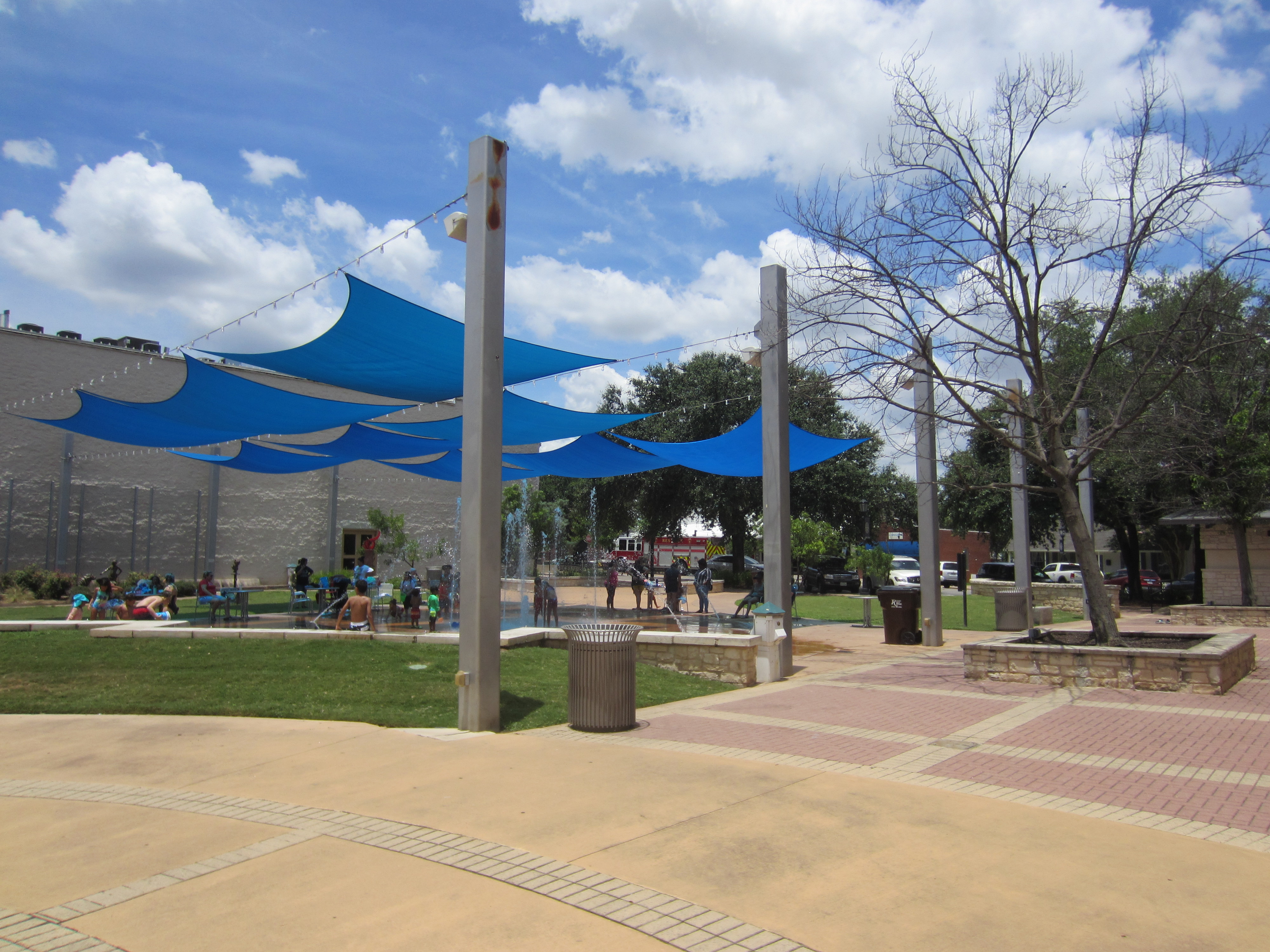
The plaza in 2021
