= Parkside, Camden =

Populated place in Camden County, New Jersey, US

Coordinates: 39.932456°N 75.093235°W

Parkside
- Neighborhood of Camden
- Country: United States
- State: New Jersey
- County: Camden
- City: Camden
- Area code: 856

Parkside is a neighborhood in Camden, New Jersey. Located near the Cooper River, the neighborhood has a population of 4,494. Virtua Our Lady of Lourdes Hospital and Harleigh Cemetery are located in the neighborhood.

== History ==
=== Founding ===
The Parkside Land Company officially opened the sale of lots for residential use on July 17, 1899. The neighborhood was sparsely populated until the early 20th century when Camden's industrial expansion required more neighboring housing. One realty group, Smith-Austermuhl Company, was responsible for contributing to the development of the Wildwood Avenue of Parkside. The Camden-Haddonfield trolley line bolstered the appeal of the growing neighborhood.

=== 20th century ===
Being recognized as a street-car suburb of Camden, the trajectories of Parkside and Camden are closely tied. Deindustrialization cut Camden's manufacturing sector drastically in the 1950s and 1960s. This had a ripple effect on the neighborhood which housed the industrial workers of Camden. The demographic change of the Parkside neighborhood occurred in the post-WWII and post-deindustrialization period in which white flight, blockbusting, and slum clearance all played a part.

== Education ==
=== Forest Hill Elementary School ===
The school opened in September 1969 and is located on Wildwood avenue and Park boulevard. Forest Hill Elementary serves grades kindergarten through fifth.

=== Cooper B. Hatch Junior High School ===
Cooper B. Hatch Junior High School was opened in 1924. It was constructed to combat the over-crowding which was affecting Camden City schools. In 2016, the Camden Big Picture Learning Academy moved in the Cooper B. Hatch building. The move was made to combat the discomfort that the growing size of the Academy felt in the smaller and older building with the added benefit of providing students with an auditorium and a gymnasium.

=== Camden High School ===
Camden High School was founded in 1891 in the then Forest Hill (now Farnham Park) area.

=== Camden Big Picture Learning Academy ===
Formerly Met-East High school. The academy was located on Kaighn Avenue near Farnham Park before their relocation to Park boulevard.

== Landmarks ==
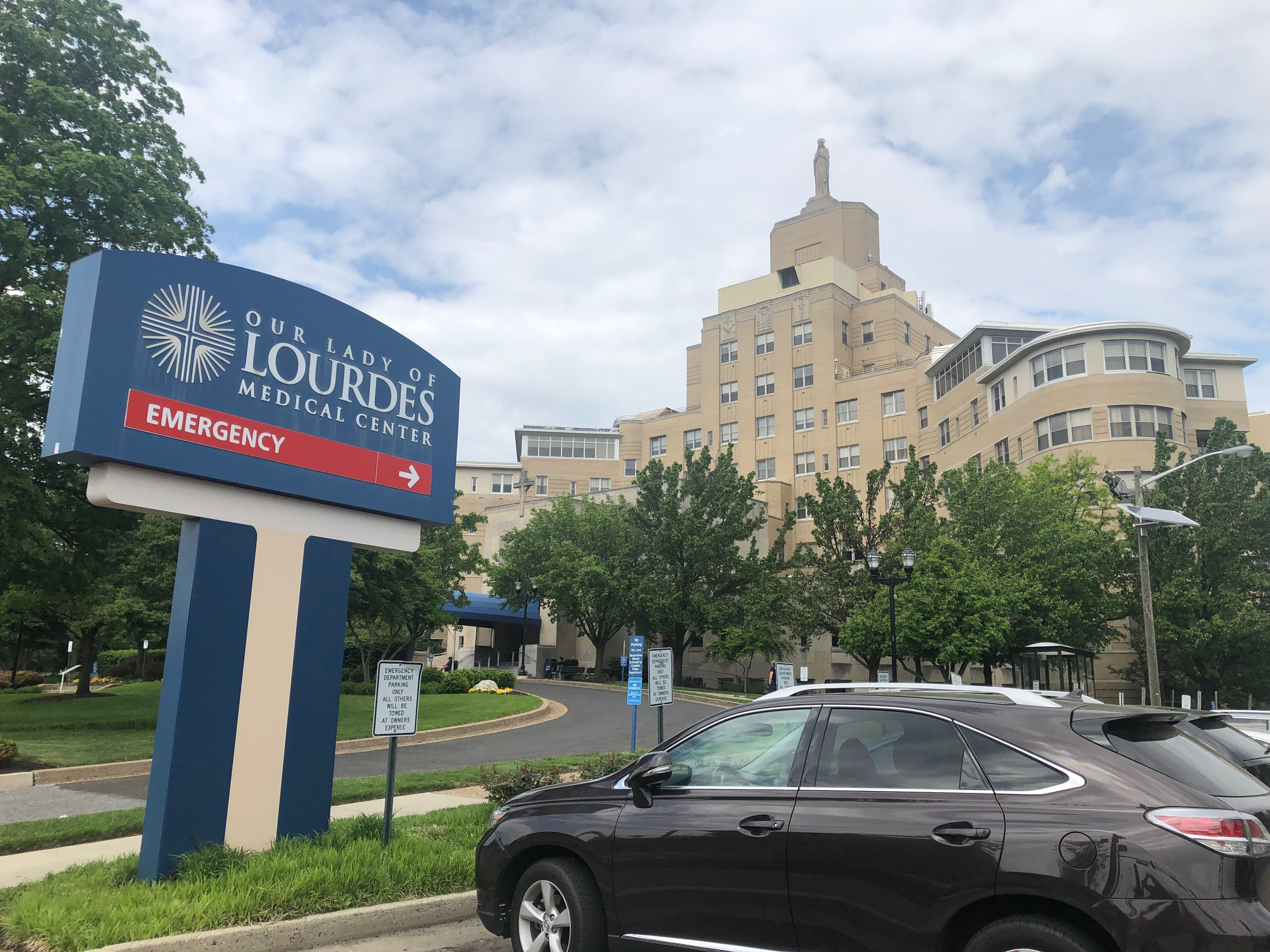
Our Lady of Lourdes as seen from the corner of Vesper Boulevard and Haddon Avenue.

=== Virtua Our Lady of Lourdes Hospital ===
The land where Virtua Our Lady of Lourdes occupies was originally in possession of Bartholomew J. Eustace who "turned over the land" in September 1947. The building of the hospital increased the number of hospital beds in the county which was far below the United States Public Health service minimum recommendation. In August 2017, Cooper Health Systems reached a deal to purchase the hospital system for $135 million. The merger failed and as a result in December 2018, Cooper sought legal action against Our Lady of Lourdes to regain its $15 million deposit. In June 2018, Virtua, a local healthcare system, agreed to purchase the Lourdes Health System. A deal which was approved from state and county regulators on July 1, 2019.

=== Harleigh Cemetery ===
The Harleigh Cemetery Company was founded on April 28, 1885. The tract of land which it occupies was previously owned by Isaac Cooper, a member of the influential Cooper family. The cemetery officially opened on August 10, 1886. In 2012, the cemetery began to provide free interment to Camden County veterans by providing 10,000 burial lots.

=== Donkey's Place ===
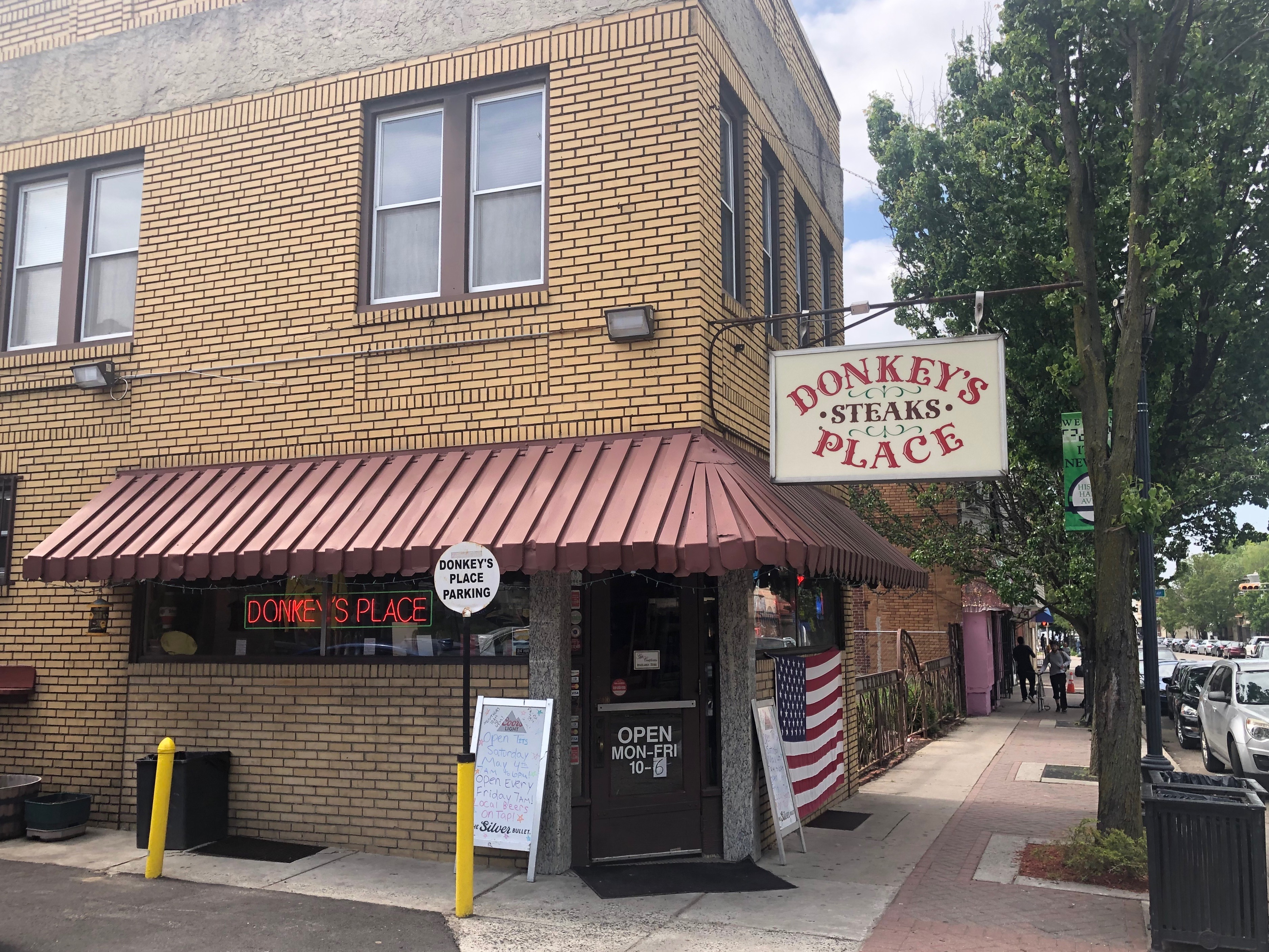
Donkey's Place storefront.

Donkey's Place is an acclaimed restaurant which specializes the regional fast food item of cheesesteaks. Established in 1943 by Leon Lucas, the restaurant came into regional and national prominence after famed chef Anthony Bourdain claimed it was the best place in the region to get a cheesesteak on his TV show Parts Unknown. Donkey's Place has appeared on TV shows such as The Goldbergs.

=== Farnham Park ===
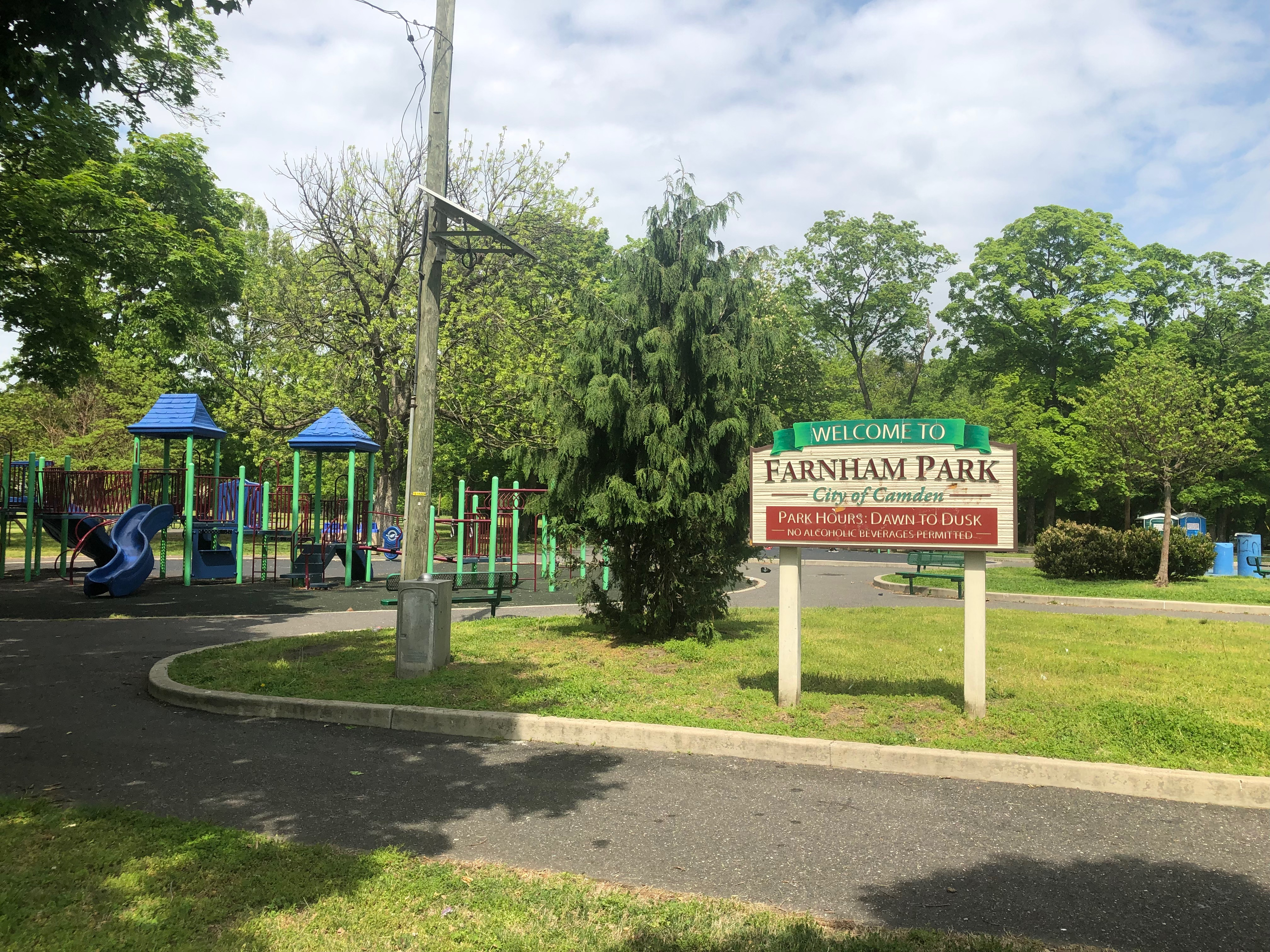
Farnham Park playground.

The park began as an initiative from the Women's Park association. They began to lobby the City council to purchase the land in the Red Hill for a public park in May 1901. The land was owned by the Parkside Land and Improvement Company. The Park associations plea was heard and negotiations went underway but quickly reached an impasse between the City council and the Parkside Land and Improvement company over the price of the land. The proposed land purchase became politicized resulting in Mayor Nowrey resigning from office rather than signing the purchasing bill of the land. The purchase was completed in 1904 for the price of $90,000. The park was renamed to Farnham Park on December 1, 1927 to honor the Levi Farnham, the city engineer of 30 years. For 30 years, the park was also home to a George Washington statue which was moved downtown in the 1980s due to continued vandalism.

In 1966, the park was strongly considered as a possible location for the main campus location for what would become Camden County College. The debate was contentious between those for and against the park hosting the campus. Pro-campus advocates argued that if the campus was not to be built then something which would generate tax revenue should while detractors argued that removing the park would be akin to removing Central Park from New York City. The campus ended up being located on the grounds of a seminary in Blackwood.

The park has been subject to destructive weather events most notably Tropical Storm Doria in August 1971 which damaged a levee and left the park flooded for decades. The park received major renovations in 2011 which would help combat against future flooding.

The park is the largest in the city covering a total of 71 acres. The Farnham-Cooper Bikeway was a planned addition to the Cooper River Greenway which connects the two parks.

On June 11, 2020, the park's Christopher Columbus statue, which had been vandalized with red paint and beheaded, was removed. An attempt by protestors to block the truck carrying the removed statue also resulted in the statue falling onto to the ground and breaking into several pieces. At the time of its removal, the statue was one of 43 Christopher Columbus statues and monuments located throughout the state of New Jersey.
