= Arie Gluck =

Israeli runner and coach

Arie Gill-Glick
Personal information
- Native name: אריה גליק
- Citizenship: Israel
- Born: April 13, 1930 Czechoslovakia
- Died: June 23, 2016 (aged 86) Voorhees Township, New Jersey

Sport
- Country: Israel
- Sport: Athletics
- Events: 400m; 800m
- College team: Adelphi University

Achievements and titles
- Personal bests: 400 metres: 49.6 (1952); 800 metres: 1:59.7 (1952)

Arie Gluck (Hebrew: אריה גליק; April 13, 1930 – June 23, 2016) was an Israeli runner and coach. He competed in the 1952 Summer Olympic Games under the surname Gill or Gill-Glick.

== Early and personal life ==
Gluck was born in Czechoslovakia on April 13, 1930. In 1933, Gluck emigrated with his parents with him to the British Mandate of Palestine and settled in the city of Tel Aviv.

At age 15, Gluck served in the Haganah, Israel's pre-state army. At age 17, he served in the Palmach, the Haganah's elite special forces. As a teenager, Gluck fought in the 1947–1949 Palestine war and was wounded.

In later life, Gluck and his wife Elaine lived in Voorhees Township, New Jersey. He named his son Gill, and also had two daughters, Roni and Ruth (who became associate director at the Betty and Milton Katz Jewish Community Center in Cherry Hill, New Jersey, after serving as its physical education director). He attended synagogue at Temple Emanuel and Congregation M'kor Shalom, both in Cherry Hill.

== Running career ==
His personal bests were 49.6 in the 400 metres, and 1:59.7 in the 800 metres, both in 1952.

He competed for Israel at the 1952 Summer Olympics in Helsinki at the age of 22. In the Men's 400 metres he came in 5th in Heat 5 with a time of 50.2, and in the Men's 800 metres he came in 6th in Heat 7 with a time of 2:00.9.

== Life after the Olympics ==
He was a physical education teacher at the time that he competed in the Olympics. After the Olympics he was recruited by the track coach at Adelphi University on Long Island, New York, for whom he competed in track. In 1959 he then worked in South Jersey as a physical education director at the Jewish Community Center (JCC). In 1966, he was named director of the Jewish Reform movement's Camp Harlam near Kresgeville, Pennsylvania in the Poconos for 37 years. He ultimately was in charge of all 12 of the movement's camps, and retired in 2002. Arie Glick died at the age of 86 in 2016, at Virtua Voorhees Hospital.

== Halls of fame ==
In 2017, Gluck was inducted into the Philadelphia Jewish Sports Hall of Fame.
