= Lourdes Hospital =

Lourdes Hospital may refer to:

- Lourdes Hospital, Kochi, Kerala, India
- Lourdes Hospital (Kentucky), Paducah, Kentucky, United States
- Lourdes Hospital (Binghamton, New York), United States
- Lourdes Medical Center of Burlington County, a hospital in Willingboro, New Jersey, United States

== See also ==
- Lourdes Heart Institute
- Our Lady of Lourdes Hospital (disambiguation)
