= Cowtail =

Cowtail may refer to:

- Cowtail stingray
- Cowtail Bar, a former ice cream parlor at Holly Ravine Farm in Cherry Hill, New Jersey

== See also ==
- Cowtail Pine (disambiguation)
- Cow Tales
