= Stafford Farm =

Farm in the Glendale section of Voorhees, New Jersey

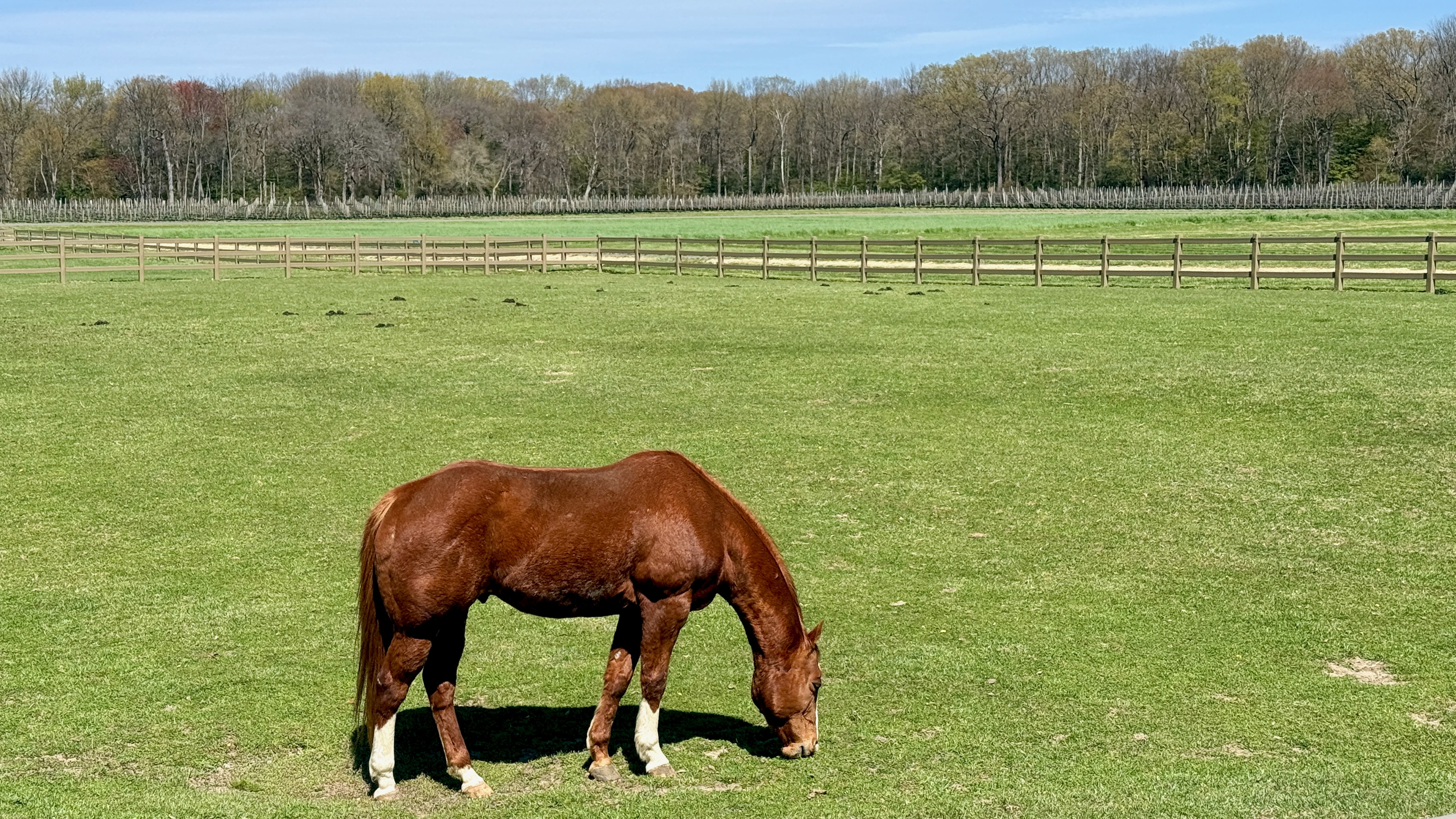
- Horse grazing at the farm
- Town/City: Glendale, Voorhees Township, New Jersey
- Coordinates: 39°51′28.0″N 74°58′25.0″W

Stafford Farm is a 100-acre farm in the Glendale section of Voorhees Township, New Jersey. Before English inhabitation, the land was used by the Leni Lenape Native Americans for travel. In 1773, it was originally settled by the son of John Stafford, on nearby Short Hills Farm in Cherry Hill. John Stafford was George Washington's personal guard during the American Revolutionary War. The current location of the farm, located at the busy intersection of Evesham Road (County Route 544) and White Horse Road (County Route 673), has been owned by its original family—longer than any other property in Voorhees. Motorists driving by the farm and those nearby at local shopping centers across the street can see the grazing horses and cattle. In addition, Standardbred race horses can be seen trotting and pacing around a half-mile training track on clear days. There were plans to develop a shopping center on the farm's property. Development did not occur, due to the efforts made by the township, county, and state to protect the land.

In March 2021, a new chapter began when Amy & Bill Green purchased the property. The farm has been updated and now includes a winery and restaurant.

Across the street on the Cherry Hill side is Holly Ravine, a shopping center and farm.
