= Glendale Methodist Episcopal Church =

Historic church in New Jersey, United States

- U.S. National Register of Historic Places
- New Jersey Register of Historic Places
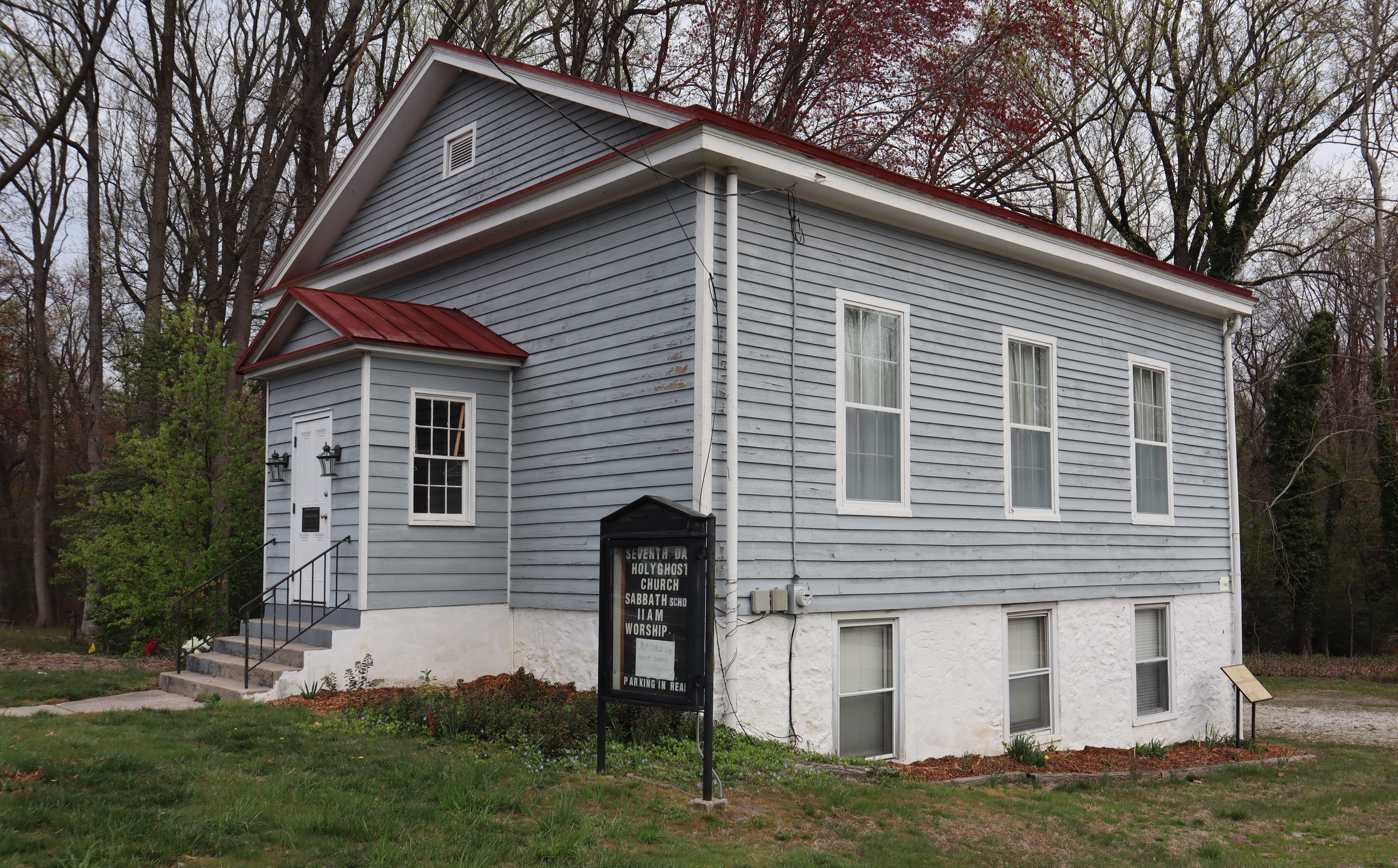
- The building in 2024 as the Seventh Day Holy Ghost Church

- Location within Camden County, New Jersey Location within New Jersey Location within the United States
- Location: 615 Haddonfield-Berlin Road, at junction with White Horse Road, Voorhees Township, New Jersey
- Coordinates: 39°51′15″N 74°58′57″W
- Area: 0.5 acres (0.20 ha)
- Built: 1855
- Architectural style: Greek Revival
- NRHP reference No.: 95001000
- NJRHP No.: 2817

Significant dates
- Added to NRHP: August 4, 1995
- Designated NJRHP: June 23, 1995

Glendale Methodist Episcopal Church is a historic church at 615 Haddonfield-Berlin Road (CR 561), at the junction with White Horse Road (CR 673), in the Glendale section of Voorhees Township, Camden County, New Jersey, United States. It was added to the National Register of Historic Places on August 4, 1995, for its significance in community planning, development, and education from 1855 to 1920. At the time of its construction, the village of Glendale was impacted by the train station stop of Ashland on the Camden Atlantic Railroad. Because of the railroad, Philadelphians and shore villagers came to trade and do business.

== Building design ==
The Greek Revival church building was constructed in 1855 on a sloped piece of land with a church on the top level and a school on the bottom level. The church entrance, directly facing Haddonfield-Berlin Road, includes a few steps to the door of a small entry to the church. The direct opposite side of the building, at the bottom end of the slope, has an entry to the school.

== School history, background, and significance ==
The Glendale School or Glendale Methodist Sunday School was located in the basement of the church and is considered one of Camden County's oldest public schools. The school was started by the following Glendale village members: Richard Stafford, Catherine Engle, Nixon Davis, Joseph C. Stafford, Jesse Patterson, Israel Riggins, Montgomery Stafford, and Theodore Bishop. There was a story passed down about the school that one of its founding members, Alexander Cooper, originally built the school in support of the prohibitionist cause, especially because there was a nearby tavern constructed down the street from the church.

=== Glendale Methodist Episcopal Church during the temperance movement ===
Many church members were petitioning for acts that represented Alexander Cooper's supposed act in Congress. The Congressional Record of 1898 documents the Church members of Glendale Methodist Episcopal Church petitioning against the sale and use of liquor in governmental buildings and the negation of anti-cigarette laws.

=== Walt Whitman’s time at the Glendale Methodist Episcopal Church ===
It has been documented that Walt Whitman would often come to Glendale Methodist Episcopal Church to spend his weekend in Glendale during the mid to late 1800s. Oftentimes, he would spend his time praying at the church, walking in on classes at the school, or even bathing in the creek in the back of the church. During some of his time there, Walt Whitman even took time to write his novel, Specimen Days.

== The 20th and 21st centuries for Glendale Methodist Episcopal Church ==
By the time 1920 hit, the church and school ceased to operate. The place where the school stood was often used for community functions and events. After a multitude of events that came through the church, it was finally given a grant award of $123875 in 2004, which was used five years later, in 2009, to renovate the church. As of 2022, the church is 167 years old and is used by congregants all around the Camden County area to celebrate Methodist Episcopal holidays and events.

== See also ==
- National Register of Historic Places listings in Camden County, New Jersey
