= Our Lady of Lourdes Hospital =

Our Lady of Lourdes Hospital may refer to:

- Our Lady of Lourdes Hospital, Drogheda, in Drogheda, County Louth, Ireland
- Our Lady of Lourdes Hospital (Manila), in Manila, Philippines
- Our Lady of Lourdes Regional Medical Center, a hospital in Lafayette, Louisiana, United States
- Virtua Our Lady of Lourdes Hospital, a hospital in Camden, New Jersey, United States

== See also ==
- Lourdes Hospital (disambiguation)
- Our Lady of Lourdes
