= County Route 544 (New Jersey) =

County highway in New Jersey, U.S.

County Route 544
- CR 544 highlighted in red

Route information
- Length: 14.94 mi (24.04 km)

Major junctions
- West end: CR 534 in Deptford Township
- Route 42 in Deptford Township; Route 41 in Deptford Township; Route 168 in Runnemede; US 30 in Magnolia; Route 73 in Evesham Township
- East end: CR 623 in Medford Township

Location
- Country: United States
- State: New Jersey
- Counties: Gloucester, Camden, Burlington

Highway system
- County routes in New Jersey; 500-series routes
← CR 543	→ CR 545

County Route 544 (CR 544) is a county highway in the U.S. state of New Jersey. The highway extends 14.94 miles (24.04 km) from Cooper Street (CR 534) in Deptford Township to Taunton Boulevard (CR 623) in Medford.

== Route description ==
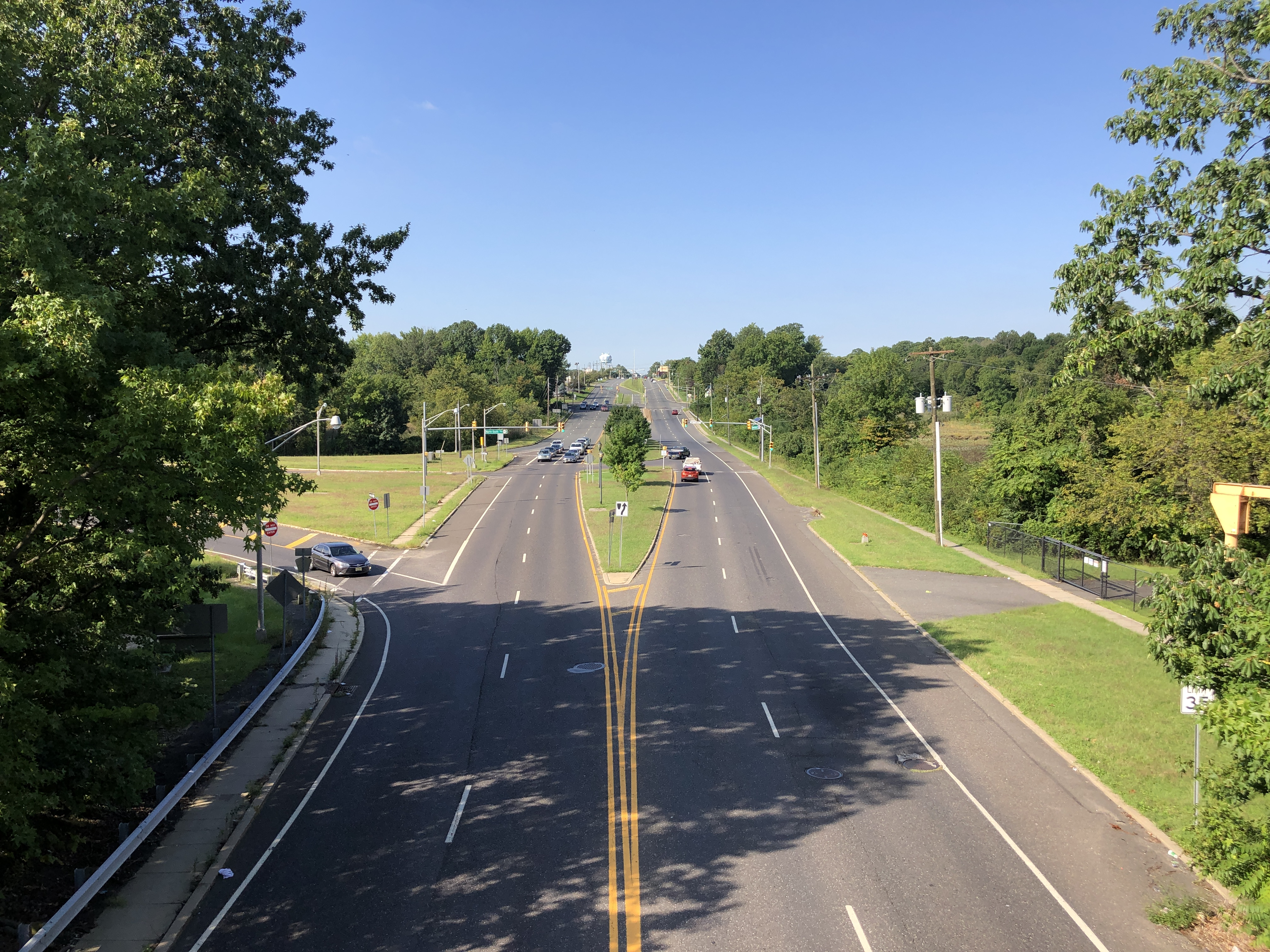
View westbound along CR 544 (Clements Bridge Road) from Route 42 in Deptford Township

CR 544 begins at an intersection with CR 534 in Deptford Township, Gloucester County, heading northeast on Clements Bridge Road, a three-lane road with a center left-turn lane. The road passes through residential neighborhoods and intersects CR 645, at which point the route enters commercial areas. CR 544 widens into a four-lane divided highway as it passes over the Route 55 freeway and comes to the CR 621 junction. At this point, the road passes north of the Deptford Mall, with the eastbound direction carrying three lanes and the westbound direction carrying two lanes. After the mall, CR 544 comes to an interchange with the Route 42 freeway. A short distance later, the route comes to Route 41 and turns northeast to run concurrent with that route on a two-lane undivided road.

The road crosses the Big Timber Creek into Camden County, running along the border of Runnemede to the north and Gloucester Township to the south. CR 544 splits from Route 41 by heading east-northeast on Evesham Road, continuing along the Runnemede/Gloucester Township border through residential areas, crossing Route 168 (Black Horse Pike). After this intersection, the road heads past a mix of homes and businesses, reaching the CR 736 junction. CR 544 enters more residential surroundings with occasional businesses as it forms the border between Magnolia to the north and Gloucester Township to the south before fully entering Magnolia. The route crosses Conrail Shared Assets Operations' Beesleys Point Secondary railroad line and CR 727 in quick succession before coming to CR 669 and reaching the US 30 junction. CR 544 passes homes as it leaves Magnolia and forms the border between Lawnside to the north and Somerdale to the south, reaching a junction with CR 668. After crossing Coopers Creek, the road heads more east along the border between Cherry Hill to the north and Voorhees Township to the south, intersecting CR 679 before passing under the PATCO Speedline and NJ Transit's Atlantic City Line near the Ashland PATCO station. CR 544 passes more residential development and crosses CR 670 before reaching a junction with CR 561 and CR 678 farther east. At this intersection, the route widens to four lanes, passing the Woodcrest Country Club. The route enters less dense wooded residential development before passing Holly Ravine Farm and reaching the CR 673 junction. From here, the road passes Stafford Farm, along with a mix of woods and development. The road passes to the north of the former Virtua Voorhees Hospital prior to crossing CR 675. CR 544 continues past residential subdivisions and businesses, including the Voorhees Main Street Complex, as it crosses over CR 671. Before approaching the Burlington County line, CR 544 passes Congregation M'Kor Shalom, a synagogue on the Cherry Hill side.

CR 544 continues into Evesham Township in Burlington County and reaches an intersection with Route 73. Past this intersection, the route becomes the two-lane divided Marlton Parkway and passes The Promenade at Sagemore shopping mall, as well as residential subdivisions, curving to the southeast. At the Tomlinson Mill Road intersection, CR 544 becomes two-lane undivided Taunton Lake Road and enters forested areas with some homes. The route crosses into Medford Township and comes to its eastern terminus at CR 623.

== Major intersections ==
County	Location	mi	km	Destinations	Notes
Gloucester	Deptford Township	0.00	0.00	CR 534 (Cooper Street)	Western terminus
Gloucester	Deptford Township	1.59	2.56	Route 42 – Atlantic City, Camden, Philadelphia	Route 42 exit 12
Gloucester	Deptford Township	1.84	2.96	Route 41 south (Hurffville Road) to Route 42 – Glassboro, Philadelphia	West end of Route 41 overlap
Camden	Runnemede	2.16	3.48	Route 41 north – Runnemede, Haddonfield	East end of Route 41 overlap
Camden	Runnemede	2.82	4.54	Route 168 (Black Horse Pike) to N.J. Turnpike – Bellmawr, Turnersville	
Camden	Magnolia	5.26	8.47	US 30 (White Horse Pike) – Camden, Berlin	
Camden	Cherry Hill Township	7.35	11.83	CR 561 (Haddonfield-Berlin Road)	
Burlington	Evesham Township	11.12	17.90	Route 73 – Palmyra, Berlin	
Burlington	Medford Township	14.94	24.04	CR 623 north (Taunton Boulevard)	Eastern terminus
1.000 mi = 1.609 km; 1.000 km = 0.621 mi: Concurrency terminus
