= Glendale, Camden County, New Jersey =

Glendale, New Jersey
- Unincorporated community
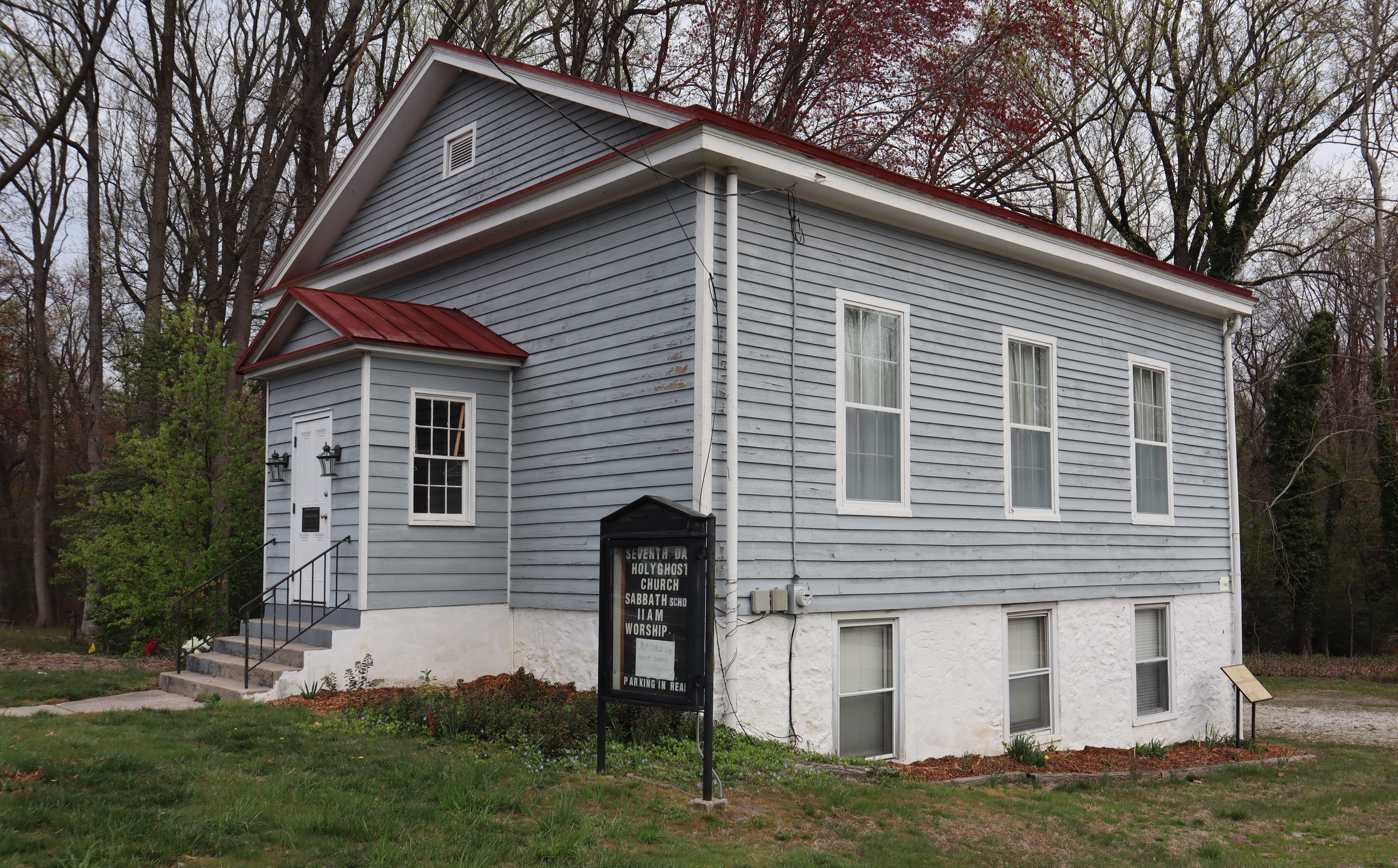
- Glendale Methodist Episcopal Church, listed on the National Register of Historic Places

- Location in Camden County (Inset: Camden County in New Jersey) Glendale (New Jersey) Glendale (the United States)
- Coordinates: 39°51′13″N 74°58′57″W
- Country: United States
- State: New Jersey
- County: Camden
- Township: Voorhees
- Elevation: 102 ft (31 m)
- Time zone: UTC-5 (Eastern (EST))
  - Summer (DST): UTC-4 (EDT)
- GNIS feature ID: 876630

Glendale is an unincorporated community located within Voorhees Township in Camden County, New Jersey, United States. The area is primarily located at the intersection of County Route 561 (Haddonfield-Berlin Road) and County Route 673 (White Horse Road). This intersection is home to the Glendale Methodist Episcopal Church, which was listed on the National Register of Historic Places in 1995. The community of Glendale is home to many retail stores, businesses, and residential subdivisions. Saddlehill Winery is located on the historic Stafford Farm in the community.

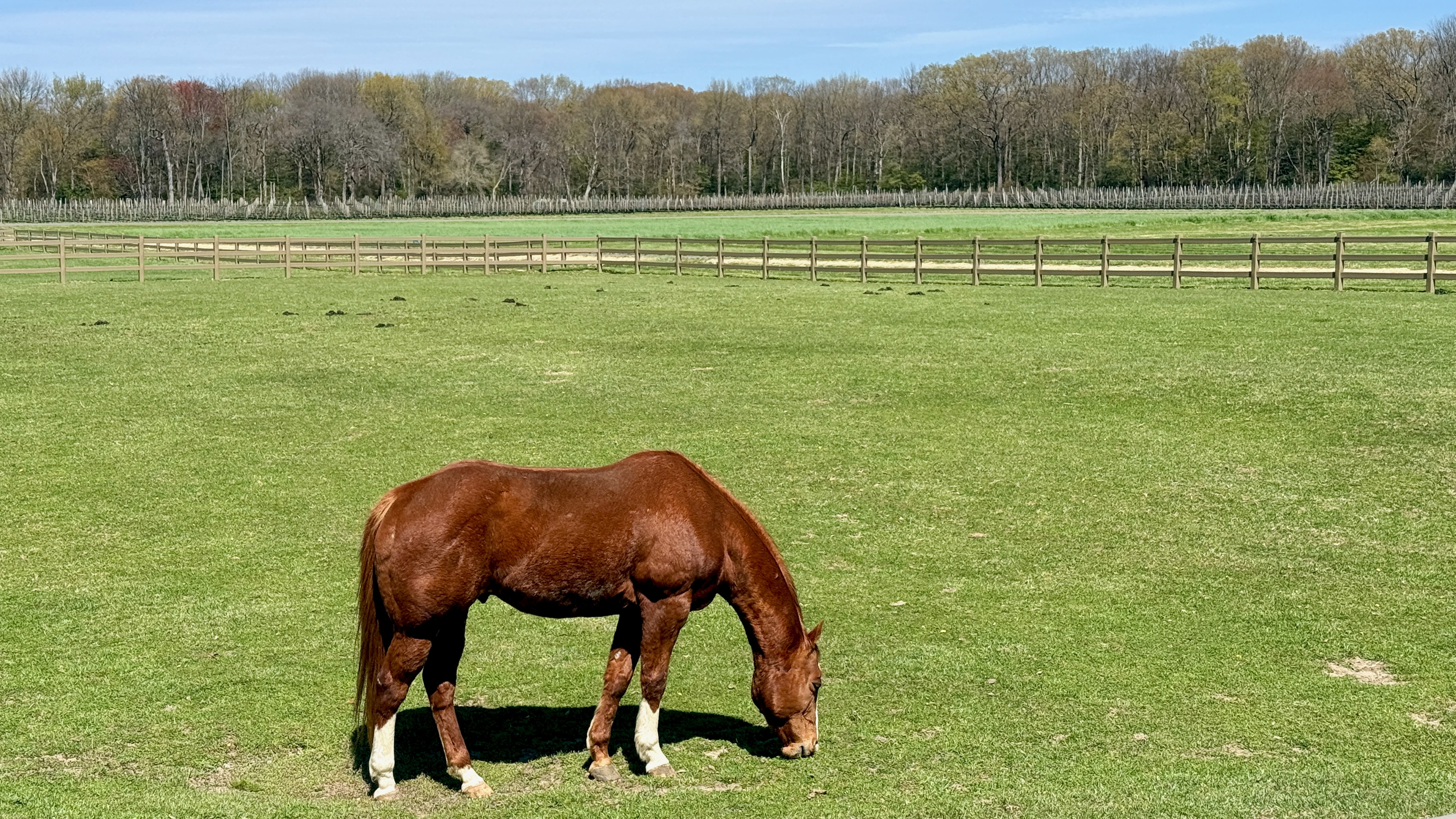
Horse grazing at the Stafford Farm
