= Fred Neulander =

American rabbi (1941–2024)

- Born: August 14, 1941
- Died: April 17, 2024 (aged 82); New Jersey State Prison, Trenton, New Jersey, U.S.
- Occupation: Rabbi
- Height: 5 ft 6 in (168 cm)
- Spouse: Carol Neulander
- Conviction: Murder (1994)
- Penalty: Life imprisonment

Details
- Victims: Carol Neulander, 52

Fred J. Neulander (August 14, 1941 – April 17, 2024) was an American Reform rabbi from Cherry Hill, New Jersey, who was convicted of hiring two men to murder his wife, Carol Neulander, in 1994. He died while serving a prison term of 30 years to life at New Jersey State Prison in Trenton, New Jersey.

== Biography ==
Neulander was the founding rabbi of the Congregation M'Kor Shalom Reform Temple in Cherry Hill, New Jersey. It opened in the summer of 1974. He had previously been the assistant rabbi at Temple Emanuel, also in Cherry Hill. Neulander graduated from Trinity College in 1963.

In 2002, Neulander was convicted of paying congregant Len Jenoff and drifter Paul Daniels $30,000 (in some sources, $18,000) for the November 1, 1994 murder of his wife, Carol. The case became a media circus and was broadcast live on CourtTV. In February 1995, he resigned as Rabbi from Congregation M'Kor Shalom.

At the time of his wife's murder, Neulander had been involved in a two-year affair with Philadelphia radio personality Elaine Soncini. The affair began after he visited Soncini's Jewish husband, Ken Garland, in the hospital and later officiated at Garland's funeral. Soncini, who was Catholic, converted to Judaism and joined M'Kor Shalom as a member during their affair.

Neulander died on April 17, 2024, at the age of 82.

== Trials ==
Tried before Judge Linda G. Baxter in 2001, the first trial resulted in a hung jury. It had been empaneled in Camden County, New Jersey.

Due to the intense media coverage in Camden County, the re-trial was moved to Monmouth County. At the 2002 re-trial, Neulander was defended by Mt. Holly attorney Mike Riley. In Monmouth, Neulander was found guilty. His son Matthew, whose testimony at the first trial had been indifferent, was by the time of the second trial thoroughly convinced of his father's guilt. Following the verdict, Assistant Prosecutor Jim Lynch submitted to the jury the question of whether or not the death penalty should be sought. The jury panel were deadlocked on deciding on the death penalty. Neulander was sentenced to serve 30 years to life at the New Jersey State Prison in Trenton. In an interview by ABC's Barbara Walters after his incarceration, he told her "You have no idea how much rage I have". He was also saddened that two of his three adult children testified against him.

== Appeal ==
In December 2006, the New Jersey Superior Court, Appellate Division affirmed Fred Neulander's conviction on appeal.

His appellate counsel had stated that the trial court had erred in not permitting Neulander to argue a third party liability defense based on a similar home invasion burglary murder which had occurred in Cherry Hill. Neulander had also argued court error on the issue of double or triple layer "hearsay" evidence, i.e., the out-of-court statement by Carol Neulander as elicited by and through her daughter, about the telephone conversation involving the "bathroom man". Although an appeal and post-conviction relief application were planned, Neulander's best chance at a new trial had been lost. He was incarcerated in the New Jersey State Prison at the time of his death.
