= Betty and Milton Katz Jewish Community Center =

Coordinates: 39.88217°N 74.96878°W

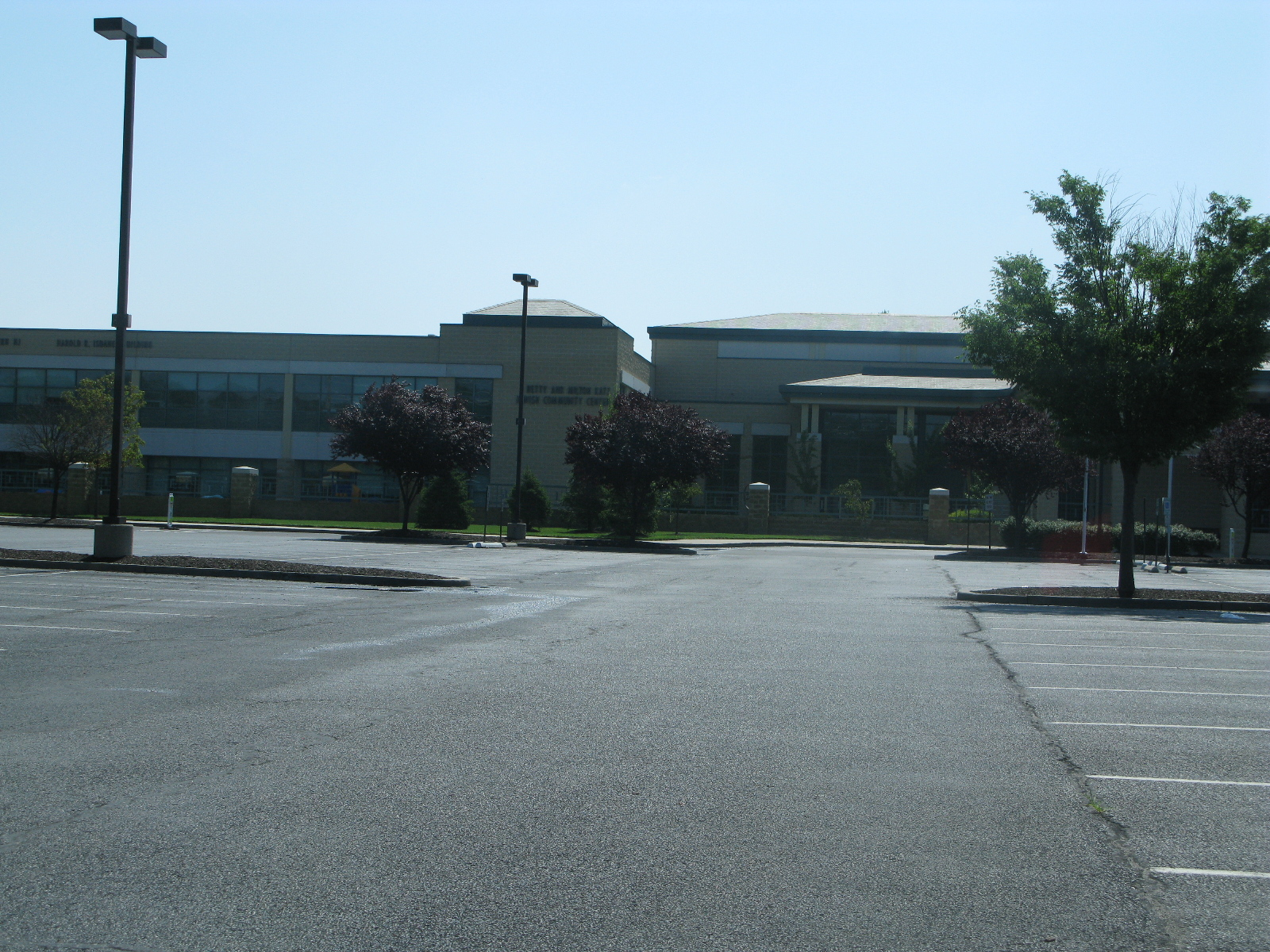
Katz JCC Weinberg Campus

The Betty and Milton Katz Jewish Community Center (locally known as the Katz JCC, the JCC, or "the J") is a Jewish Community Center located in Cherry Hill, New Jersey.

== History ==
Founded in the 1940s, the Jewish Community Center originally had its facilities in both Camden and Pennsauken, New Jersey. As the facilities grew over time, so did the services that were offered. A new JCC building opened in 1997 on the Weinberg Campus in Cherry Hill, at the corner of Springdale and Kresson Roads (across from Temple Emanuel). The need for a new JCC was in response to the significant population growth that Cherry Hill has experienced since the 1970s. Several Jewish cultural and educational programs, along with child, teen and adult programs are held at the JCC. In 1942, the JCC Camps at Medford was established. Operated by the Katz JCC, the camp consists of 120 acres and is the largest Jewish day camp in North America. Philanthropist Lewis Katz named the center in memory of his parents.
