= Holly Ravine Farm =

Shopping center in Cherry Hill, New Jersey

Coordinates: 39.860546°N 74.974737°W

Holly Ravine Farm is a farm and shopping center located in Cherry Hill, New Jersey, United States. The farm was the site of the Cowtail Bar, an ice cream parlor established in 1933 by former Cherry Hill mayor John Gilmour, Jr., who was the first mayor of Cherry Hill (previously known as Delaware Township). In 1964, Gilmour added a petting zoo on the property known as the Moo Zoo. He sold the Cowtail Bar in 1987.

The farm is located on the corner of Evesham Road (County Route 544) and Springdale Road (County Route 673) on Cherry Hill's eastern side, near the border of Voorhees. Across the street in Voorhees is the site of Stafford Farm, another farm in the area.

Plans to develop a 38,000-square-foot shopping center and a 3,000-square-foot bank on a piece of Holly Ravine Farm occurred in the late 1980s by Site Development Incorporated (SDI). Construction began in Spring 1989 to establish the Holly Ravine Shopping Center. Opened in 1990, the center includes a CVS Pharmacy, a dry cleaners, a hair salon, a Chinese restaurant, a delicatessen, a Wawa Food Market, and several other stores. A Commerce Bank (now TD Bank) was built as a standalone building on the Holly Ravine property. The farm still operates and is located behind the shopping center.
