= Congregation Kol Ami (Cherry Hill, New Jersey) =

Reform Jewish synagogue in New Jersey, US

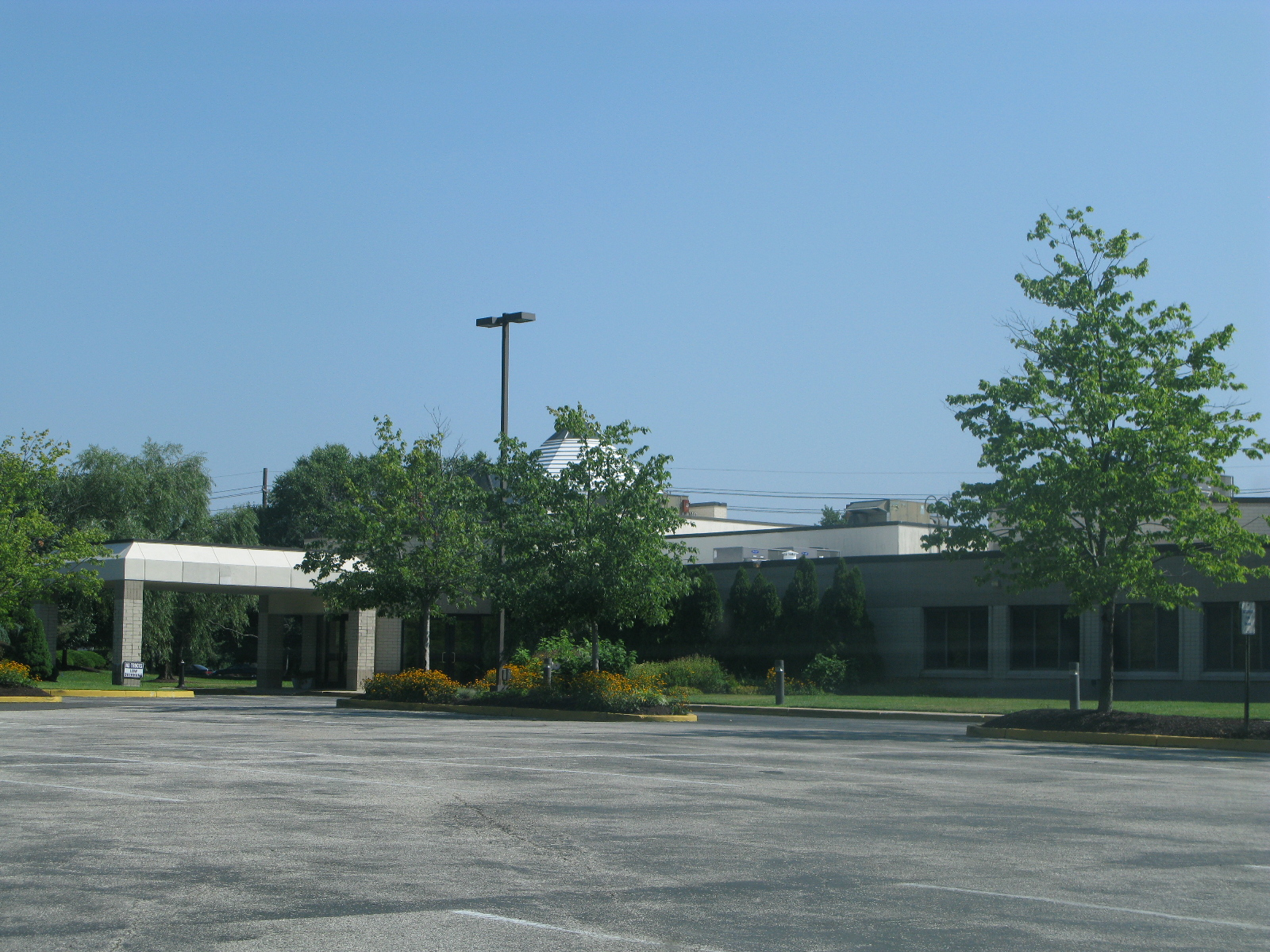
- The former Temple Emanuel, now Kol Ami synagogue in 2011

- Location in Camden County, New Jersey

Religion
- Affiliation: Reform Judaism
- Ecclesiastical or organizational status: Synagogue
- Leadership: Rabbi Jennifer L. Frenkel
- Status: Active

Location
- Location: 1101 Springdale Road, Cherry Hill, Camden County, New Jersey
- Country: United States
- Interactive map of Congregation Kol Ami
- Coordinates: 39°52′49″N 74°58′10″W

Architecture
- Type: Synagogue
- Established: 1950 (as a congregation)
- Completed: 1992

Website
- kolaminj.org

Congregation Kol Ami (formerly Temple Emanuel) is a Reform Jewish congregation and synagogue located at 1101 Springdale Road, in Cherry Hill, Camden County, New Jersey, in the United States. The congregation was founded in 1950 on the western side of Cherry Hill, and moved in 1992 to Cherry Hill's east side. Its first rabbi was Herbert M. Yarrish, who served from 1956 to 1975. As of 2022, the senior rabbi is Jennifer L. Frenkel and the cantors are Rhoda J. Harrison and Neil Schnitzer.

== History ==
Temple Emanuel was established in 1950 as Cherry Hill's first Reform Jewish congregation. They hired their first full-time rabbi, Herbert M. Yarrish, in 1956. Yarrish was a graduate of Harvard University, who had received a master's degree in Hebrew letters from Hebrew Union College in 1949.

The members initially met in a variety of locations. In 1959, when membership reached approximately 300, the congregation broke ground on its first permanent synagogue building in Delaware Township, on Cherry Hill's west side. Jerome P. David joined as assistant rabbi in 1974.

Yarrish retired in 1975; following his retirement he worked as a stockbroker. He was succeeded as senior rabbi by Edwin N. Soslow, a role he filled until his death in 1987. Soslow was succeeded as senior rabbi by Jerome P. David. The congregation moved to its current building in eastern Cherry Hill in 1992.

In 2005, Temple Emanuel broke the world record for dreidel spinning, with 541 dreidels spun simultaneously for at least ten seconds. There were 578 participants, succeeding the previous record of 535 people by the University of Maryland Hillel in 1999. In 2010, members of Yeshiva University broke Temple Emanuel's record, by spinning a total of 618 dreidels.

In 2022, Congregation M'kor Shalom and Temple Emanuel merged into one synagogue, Congregation Kol Ami. Temple Emanuel's building was selected as the synagogue for the merged congregation.

== Current building ==
The congregation acquired 9 acres (3.6 ha) of land on the east side of Cherry Hill (at the intersection of Springdale and Kresson Roads) in 1989, and began construction of a new synagogue building there. In 1992, the congregation moved to the new facilities, across from the Katz Jewish Community Center (which later opened in 1997). The facilities include a social hall (used for special occasions such as weddings, Bar and Bat Mitzvahs, and conferences), an industrial kitchen, an outdoor atrium (also used for Sukkot), a spacious lobby, chapel, sanctuary, library, preschool and Hebrew school complexes.
