= Lourdes Heart Institute =

Hospital in Kochi, Kerala, India

Lourdes Heart Institute and Neuro Centre (LHINC) is a new block set up in Lourdes Hospital, Cochin, Kerala, India, to cater to tertiary level care for the entire spectrum of cardiovascular and neurological disease. It was inaugurated on 16 March 2007, by Mr. A. K. Antony, the Defence Minister of India. This institute was started to meet a long-felt need to provide cardiac and neurological interventional facilities, and especially to provide interventional neurological facilities for the treatment of strokes, including selective thrombolysis and primary angioplasty for stroke which was hitherto unavailable in this part of India.

== Facilities ==
Lourdes Heart Institute has the first biplane digital flat panel cathetherisation laboratory in South Asia, which is especially suited for neurological and cardiological intervention work, including carotid stenting, intra-cerebral vessel stenting, primary angioplasty, valvotomy, electrophysiologic procedures and pediatric cardiology.

A new building was built behind the main Lourdes hospital block, with outpatient departments and invasive cardiology on the ground level, the cath lab and ICCU suites on the first level and rooms on the higher levels.

== Treatments available ==
The LHINC Cath lab is capable of handling every type of interventional cardiology procedure, with the advantage of its biplane system, it has the unique capability of performing interventional procedures in less time with the advantage of using far lesser contrast than in a routine single plane cath lab, such a facility is rare, this being the first in South Asia, and even as late as December, 2007, there were only 8 such labs in the United States.

=== Interventional cardiology ===
LHINC has round the clock, 24/7 availability of primary angioplasty which is the standard treatment for heart attacks and results in the best results and the lowest mortality and morbidity. Other facilities include regular, elective angioplasties, day care angiography, which is done via the artery in the wrist, the radial artery which allow the patient to be discharged in a few hours and does not require extended lying down, radial angioplasty; temporary and permanent pacemaker implantations; mitral valvuloplasty, which enables the opening of narrowed heart valves, without the need for open heart surgery, with a minimally invasive "pinhole" incision in the groin; Automated Implantable cardioverter-defibrillator or AICD implantation for the prevention of sudden cardiac death in individuals at high risk and non surgical closure of "holes in the heart".

=== Cardiac surgery ===
LHINC provides cardiac surgery in adult patients including coronary artery bypass surgery, both on pump and off pump surgery, aortic surgery, valve replacement and repair and endovascular aortic stent procedure. The unit did for the first time in Kerala, 'key hole' mitral valve replacement surgery on two patients.
