= Virtua Health =

American hospital network

- Type: Non Profit Organization
- Industry: Healthcare
- Founded: 1880
- Headquarters: Marlton, New Jersey, U.S.
- Area served: Virtua Health is the largest healthcare provider in South Jersey, serving the "tri-county" region (Burlington, Camden, and Gloucester Counties).
- Key people: Dennis Pullin (President & CEO); John Matsinger (Executive Vice President & Chief Operating Officer); Bob Segin (Executive Vice President & Chief Financial Officer); Dr. Jennifer Khelil (Executive Vice President & Chief Clinical Officer); Stephanie Fendrick (Executive Vice President & Chief Strategy Officer); Rhonda Jordan (Executive Vice President & Chief H.R. Officer)
- Services: Teaching hospitals; Primary, secondary, and tertiary care centers; Urgent care; Lab services; Cancer care; Cardiac care; Transplant care; Neurosurgery; Orthopedics; Behavioral Health; Maternity care and Midwifery; Pediatrics; Ambulatory surgery centers
- Website: www.virtua.org

Virtua Health is an academic non-profit healthcare system in southern New Jersey that operates a network of hospitals, surgery centers, physician practices, and more. Virtua is one of South Jersey's largest health care provider. The main headquarters are located in Marlton. With 16,000 employees, Virtua has been named to Forbes' list of America's Best Companies and the magazine's 2025 list of America's Best Employers for Healthcare Professionals. Virtua's President and CEO Dennis Pullin has been included twice on Modern Healthcare's annual list of the 100 most influential people in the industry, and was named one of its 2023 Top Healthcare Innovators.

Virtua offers community-based care. Virtua brings health services directly into the region through Hospital at Home, physical therapy and rehabilitation, home care, and its paramedic program. It offers health equity and outreach through programs like its Pediatric Mobile Services Unit, free health screenings, and its “Eat Well” food access program.

== History ==
Virtua Health has been serving the community since the 1880s. Its history includes three different health systems now as one representing the largest health system in Southern New Jersey.

The state of New Jersey approved the incorporation of The Burlington County Hospital at Mount Holly on April 21, 1880, the first community hospital in the southern portion of the state. In an era when most health care was provided at home for those who could afford it, the poor were left without options. Dr. Francis Ashhurst assembled a board of managers, local leaders, family, and “a skillful and able corps of physicians and surgeons” to volunteer their services at the new hospital. “There is no other institution in West Jersey where the sick and wounded poor can obtain relief,” he wrote.

In 1885, a great need for a hospital in the City of Camden led homeopathic physicians to unite in organizing for that purpose. On March 2, 1885, the first hospital in the City of Camden opened as The Camden Hospital and Dispensary Association on the northeast corner of Fourth and Arch Streets. Its mission: to treat the sick, especially women, who cannot afford medical services.

In October 1998, the successors of the above two hospitals, Memorial Health Alliance and West Jersey Health System merged to create Virtua Health, the largest healthcare provider in South Jersey. Former President and CEO Richard Miller led the merger. Miller instituted the philosophies and values currently used by the company. He also adopted the widely used business strategy known as Six Sigma, making Virtua one of the first healthcare systems to use its problem-solving techniques. In 2017, Dennis Pullin assumed the role of president and CEO upon Miller's retirement.

In 2018, Virtua signed an agreement to purchase Our Lady of Lourdes Medical Center in Camden and Lourdes Medical Center of Burlington County from Trinity Health. On July 1, 2019 the two Lourdes Medical Centers joined Virtua and now operate as Virtua Our Lady of Lourdes Hospital and Virtua Willingboro Hospital.

In January 2022, Virtua and Rowan University announced an academic affiliation that includes the newly named Virtua Health College of Medicine & Life Sciences of Rowan University.

== Statistics ==
- 5 Hospitals
- 7 Emergency Departments, including 2 satellite EDs
- 8 Urgent Care Centers
- 28 Primary Care offices
- 42 Ambulatory Surgical Centers
- 391 Primary & Specialty Care practices
- 400+ Care locations
- 3,000+ Doctors and Clinicians

== Hospitals ==
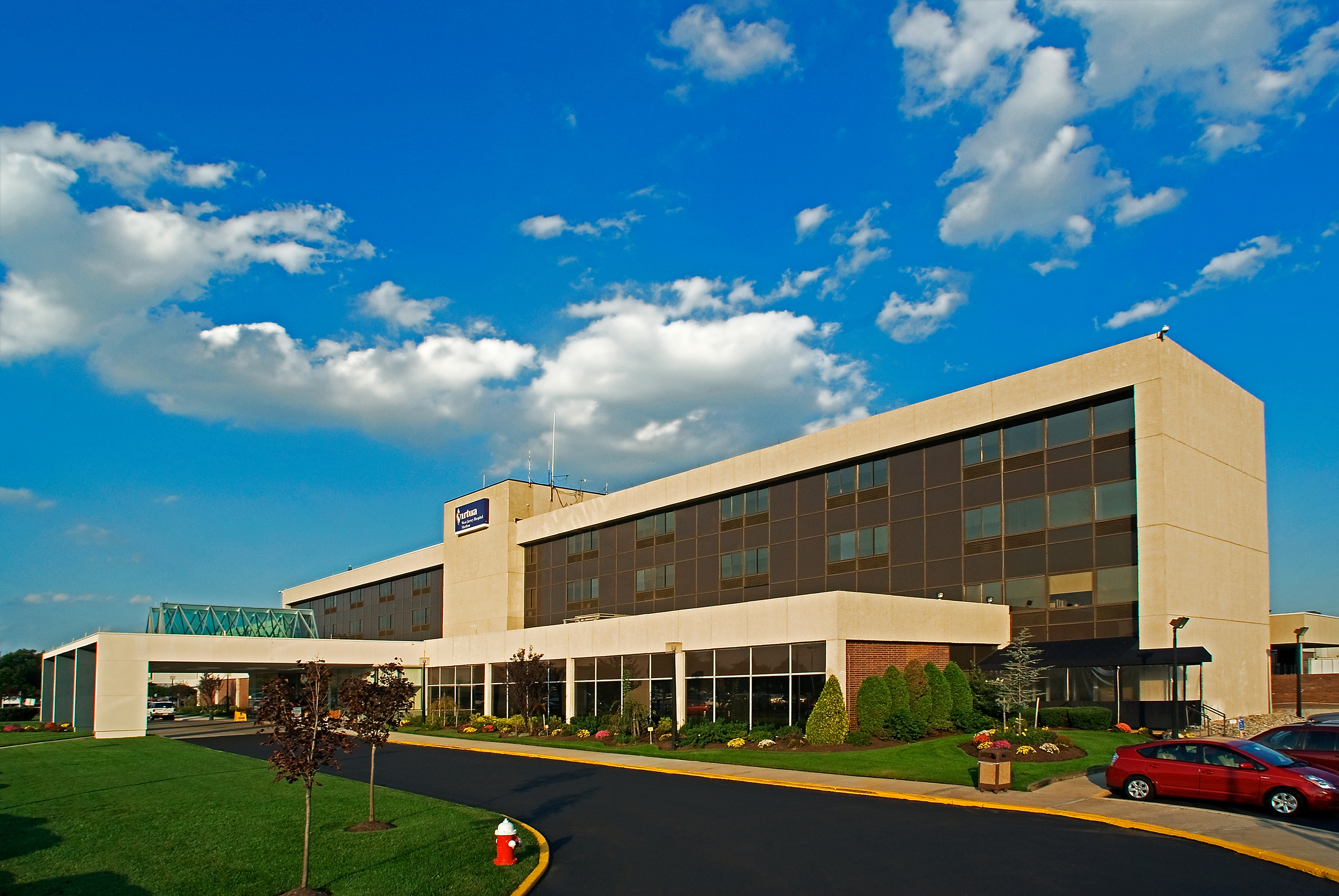
Virtua Marlton Hospital (2008)

=== Camden ===
Virtua Our Lady of Lourdes Hospital is a 340-bed destination hospital for heart care, with one of the largest programs in the Delaware Valley. The hospital in Camden is the only facility in southern New Jersey performing kidney, liver and pancreas transplants. Virtua Our Lady of Lourdes Hospital specializes in surgical services, including cardiothoracic, vascular, general, bariatric (weight-loss), gynecologic, neurologic, orthopedic and urologic. The Lourdes Regional Rehabilitation Center is the only comprehensive rehabilitation facility located within an acute care hospital in southern New Jersey. Virtua Our Lady of Lourdes Hospital is well-regarded for its community outreach, providing a variety of services for those in need, including women and children, teenagers and seniors.

=== Mount Holly (Memorial) ===
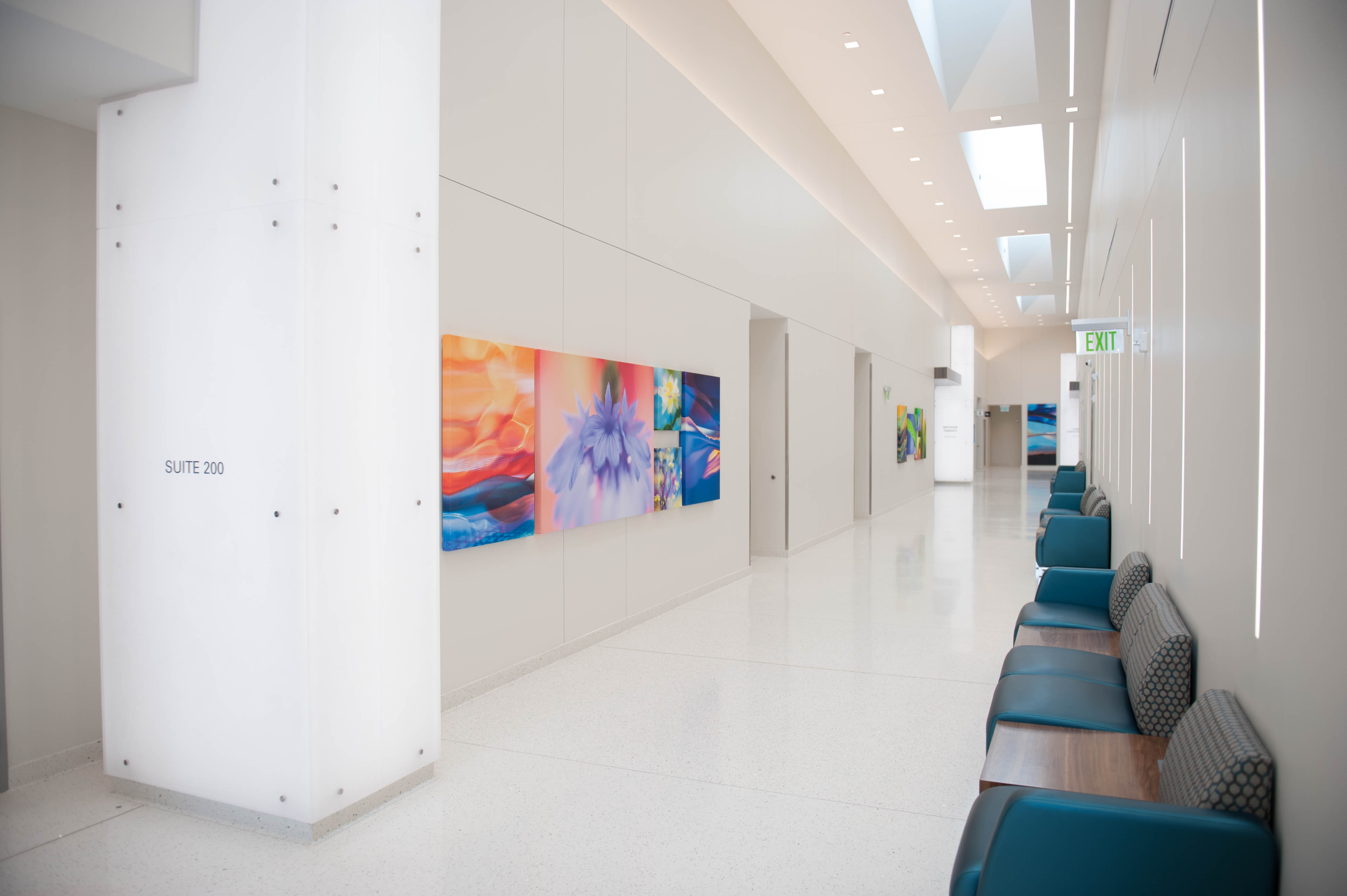
Virtua Samson Cancer Center in Moorestown, NJ

Virtua Mount Holly Hospital (formerly called Virtua Memorial) in Mount Holly has 383 beds. Most of the births that take place at Virtua happen either here or at the hospital in Voorhees. Specialty programs include a sleep center, diabetes education and treatment (including wound care), asthma management and cardiac rehabilitation.

=== Marlton ===
Virtua Marlton Hospital (Virtua West Jersey Hospital Marlton) has 198 beds. The hospital has specialty programs including arthritis management and joint replacement surgery, diabetes education and treatment, asthma management and cardiac catheterization. Formerly Garden State Community Hospital, Virtua Marlton was purchased in 1982 by what was then West Jersey Health System.

2011 Virtua Voorhees Hospital Digital Rendering

=== Voorhees ===
The Virtua Voorhees campus is located on Bowman Drive and Route 73. Opened on May 22, 2011, the campus features a “digital hospital” and an outpatient facility. The hospital consists of 370 beds, each in a private room. After the grand opening of the Voorhees hospital, the former Voorhees site was sold to Voorhees Township. Nearly 150 patients were safely transported from the former hospital to the current site by Exceptional Medical Transportation. The Virtua Voorhees Ambulatory Care Center is part of the building and opened in 2012.

The Virtua Voorhees facility originally had its location about 3 miles from the current hospital, on Carnie Blvd. and Evesham Road (CR 544) in Voorhees. The hospital was built in 1973 near surrounding farms, which are currently housing developments. This location closed in 2011. Before relocating, the Virtua Voorhees campus had 402 beds and together with the hospital in Mt. Holly, Virtua delivered more babies than at any other of the Virtua facilities.

=== Willingboro ===
Virtua Willingboro Hospital is a 169-bed community hospital specializing in surgical services, including orthopedic, vascular, general, colorectal and urologic. The hospital is well-regarded for its behavioral health, gastroenterology, and wound care programs. The Lourdes Specialty Hospital, a unit for patients who require an extended hospital stay, was the first long-term acute-care hospital in southern New Jersey.

== Outpatient centers ==
=== Virtua Ambulatory Surgery Centers ===
Virtua partners with nearly 40 ambulatory surgery centers throughout New Jersey, Pennsylvania, and Delaware. Clinical teams collectively perform over 200,000 same-day procedures each year, utilizing minimally invasive techniques. Newsweek’s annual ranking of the best ASCs in the U.S. for 2025 includes 18 Virtua Health joint-venture centers.

=== Camden Outpatient Health Center ===
Virtua Camden offers many outpatient services including the Kyle W. Will Family Health Center. Through this center, patients have access to other practices such as: dentistry, podiatry, ophthalmology, gastroenterology, cardiology and wound care. The Emergency Center is a place where patients can go when experiencing medical problems. However, since it is not a hospital, any patient requiring further attention is transported to another facility.

== Other facilities and services ==
=== Health and Wellness Center Washington Township ===
The Virtua Health and Wellness Center located in Washington Township is a medical facility with many hospital-like features. The building contains physician offices, as well as facilities for diagnostic testing and outpatient surgery. This facility opened in January 2010.

=== Health and Wellness Center Moorestown ===
Opened in 2012, the Virtua Health and Wellness Center located in Moorestown features medical offices, primary care, an urgent care center, and more. The facility provides access to nutrition and other support programs.

=== Virtua Women's Primary Care & Wellness Center ===
In 2014, Virtua launched Virtua for Women Primary Care & Wellness Center, located at its Health & Wellness Center in Moorestown. It's led by women practitioners and features offer longer appointment times in the hopes of building rapport with their patients. The program includes primary services specifically for women and ties in integrative medicine, nutritional services, and stress management.

=== Virtua Pride Primary Care ===
In 2022, Virtua Medical Group opened a primary care practice dedicated to the health needs of the LGBTQ+ community and allies located in Marlton.

=== Health and Wellness Center Camden ===
In January 2019, Virtua opened the Health and Wellness Center in Camden, housing primary, pediatric, dental, behavioral health, podiatry and specialty care, as well as physical therapy, laboratory services and education. The Center also provides a 24/7 Emergency Center for patients of all ages.

=== Midwifery Birth and Wellness Center ===
In October 2021, Virtua opened a freestanding midwifery birth and wellness center adjacent to the Virtua Voorhees Hospital campus. The center offers gynecologic and prenatal care appointments, as well as birthing suites.

=== Virtua "Eat Well" Food Access Programs ===
The Virtua Eat Well initiative furthers Virtua's mission by supporting nutrition as the foundation of a healthy lifestyle. By creating reliable and affordable sources for nutritious food, Virtua intends to create communities of wellness that demonstrate the impact a balanced diet can have on the health of an individual, a family, and entire neighborhoods. The Eat Well Mobile Farmers Market visits sites in Burlington and Camden counties year-round, increasing access to nutritious fresh produce in underserved communities. The Eat Well Food Farmacy locations in Camden and Mount Holly offer enrolled patients nutrition education, social support services, and access to free produce and nonperishables. The newest addition to Virtua’s Eat Well initiative, the Mobile Grocery Store is a year-round program that visits neighborhoods in Burlington and Camden counties that do not have easy access to healthy food options.

== Emergency Medical Services ==
=== Mobile Intensive Care Unit ===
Virtua's mobile intensive care unit (MICU), working in conjunction with local ambulances, provides advanced life support paramedic service to South Jersey residents. The MICU also provides bikes team for special events and tactical paramedics who are specially trained to provide medical support to law enforcement agencies during special operations.

==== MICU History ====
The Virtua MICU was formed as part of the merger of the Memorial Health Alliance and West Jersey Health System, which operated the Burlington County Memorial Hospital MICU and West Jersey MICU, respectively. Both MICUs were of the original nine pilot projects instituted in the 1970s to determine the effectiveness of paramedic services. West Jersey MICU went in service April 14, 1977 with Medic 1 (Voorhees), Medic 2 (Berlin), and Medic 3 (Camden City). Burlington County Memorial Hospital MICU went in service on January 10, 1978 with CARE 1, operating out of Mount Holly.

== Affiliations ==
=== Rowan University ===
Virtua Health College of Medicine & Life Sciences of Rowan University formed in 2021 through a unique academic health partnership between Rowan University, a top 100 public research institution, and Virtua Health, South Jersey’s largest health system. The college includes the Rowan-Virtua School of Osteopathic Medicine, the Rowan-Virtua School of Nursing & Health Professions, and the Rowan-Virtua School of Translational Biomedical Engineering & Sciences.

=== Medtronic ===
In 2021, Virtua and Medtronic announced a partnership focused on improving the delivery of care for residents of South Jersey, particularly those who face systemic barriers to care. Medtronic LABS, an independent impact-focused organization funded by Medtronic, simultaneously launched a separate pilot collaboration with the Cherry Hill Free Clinic and Virtua to address care and food access for people with chronic conditions – the first U.S.-based initiative for Medtronic LABS.

=== Children's Hospital of Philadelphia ===
In 2011, The Children's Hospital of Philadelphia (CHOP) and Virtua announce they have developed a partnership that will provide pediatric services at Virtua's facilities in Mount Holly and Voorhees. As part of the partnership, CHOP-employed physicians will provide care in Virtua's inpatient pediatric units and its pediatric intensive care unit (PICU) as well as providing pediatric emergency care in its emergency departments.

=== Penn Medicine ===
In 2015, Virtua and Penn Medicine announced a strategic alliance for the purpose of creating easier access to care by growing programs in South Jersey supported by both organizations, and by facilitating access to advanced care provided by Penn. The alliance includes programs for cancer and neuroscience. In 2023, the Penn Medicine | Virtua Health Proton Therapy Center in Voorhees, NJ, began treating patients.
