= Congregation M'kor Shalom =

Former Reform Jewish synagogue in New Jersey, US

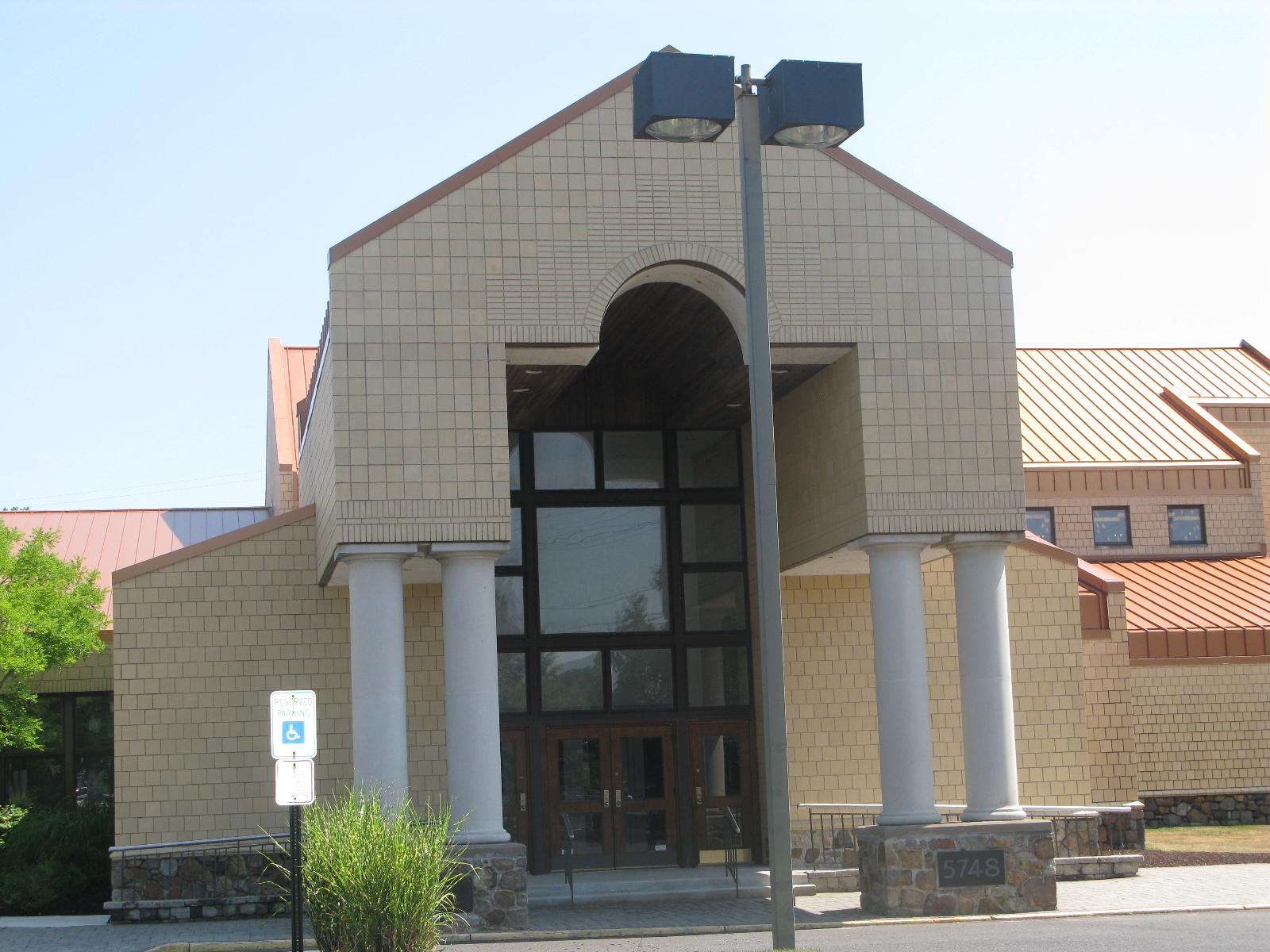
- The former M'kor Shalom synagogue in 2011

- Location of the former synagogue in Camden County, New Jersey

Religion
- Affiliation: Reform Judaism (former)
- Ecclesiastical or organizational status: Synagogue (1974–2022)
- Status: Closed; merged in 2022 to form Congregation Kol Ami

Location
- Location: 850 Evesham Road, Cherry Hill, Camden County, New Jersey
- Country: United States
- Interactive map of Congregation M'kor Shalom
- Coordinates: 39°52′25″N 74°55′51″W

Architecture
- Type: Synagogue
- Established: 1974 (as a congregation)
- Completed: 1990

Congregation M'kor Shalom (transliterated from Hebrew to mean "Source of Peace") was a Reform Jewish synagogue located at 850 Evesham Road, Cherry Hill, Camden County, New Jersey, in the United States.

Founded in 1974, M'kor Shalom merged in 2022 with Temple Emanuel, also a Reform synagogue located in Cherry Hill, to form Congregation Kol Ami. As of 2023, the former Evesham Road building was disused.

== History ==
Originally established at former locations in neighboring Marlton and Mount Laurel, the building used for worship, prior to the 2022 merger, was described by The New York Times as "spectacular new gold brick and red-topped". This building opened in 1990 and is located on Evesham Road in an affluent area in Cherry Hill. Up to its closure, the main hall of the former synagogue had polished wood, and stained glass windows created by Paul Friend. The former synagogue was built on the site of the Butts House, built in the 18th century near the boundary of the township with Evesham Township and believed to have been first owned by the Matlack family.

In 1990, an Atlantic County grand jury indicted a man from Brooklyn on charges relating to his alleged theft of Torahs from the synagogue. That year the financially troubled Congregation Beth Jacob-Beth Israel in Cherry Hill loaned the synagogue torahs, went bankrupt, was purchased by Congregation M'kor Shalom, and planned to transfer all of its assets to it.

Rabbi Fred Neulander founded the synagogue with a few supporters from the Reform synagogue Temple Emanuel, and served until his resignation in 1995. He became publicly known after he was convicted of paying congregant Len Jenoff and drifter Paul Daniels $18,000 to murder his wife Carol on November 1, 1994. Her memorial service was attended by almost 1,000 people at the synagogue.

In 1997, 100 people were evacuated from the synagogue when a bomb threat was called in. No bomb was found. In 2000, the synagogue marked its 10th year of preparing casseroles for Ronald McDonald House and soup kitchens, as a mitzvah. That year, the synagogue also joined Temple Emanuel in Cherry Hill and Congregation Adath Emanu-El in Mount Laurel as well as the Jewish Federation of Southern New Jersey to raise money to build "Shalom House" in Camden. Also in 2000, congregants planted a 2,400-square-foot (220 m^{2}) meditation and tzedakah garden from which food was to be donated to food banks and soup kitchens.

In 2022, M'kor Shalom and Temple Emanuel merged into one congregation called Congregation Kol Ami, located at Temple Emanuel's building. The M'kor Shalom building is expected to become a Yeshiva for Jewish boys.

== Prayer book and programs ==
The prayer book used during services is Mishkan T'filah. M'kor Shalom offers a religious school program for grades pre-K through 12, a full-time Early Childhood Center for ages 2 through Kindergarten, as well as adult education programs.
