= Cowtail pine =

Cowtail pine is a common name for several plants and may refer to:

- Trees of the genus Cephalotaxus, also known as the plum yews
- Specifically, the species Cephalotaxus harringtonii, also known as the Japanese plum yew
