= Virtua Willingboro Hospital =

- Virtua Health

Geography
- Location: Willingboro Township, New Jersey, United States
- Coordinates: 40.046354°N 74.880491°W

Organization
- Type: General

Services
- Beds: 249

Links
- Website: www.virtua.org/locations/hospital-virtua-lourdes-willingboro
- Lists: Hospitals in New Jersey

Virtua Willingboro Hospital is a 249-bed community hospital located in Willingboro, New Jersey. It was previously known as Lourdes Medical Center.

== Services ==
The Lourdes Cancer Center provides diagnostic, surgical, medical oncology, radiation therapy and other modalities. It has a boutique that assists patients with aesthetic needs, a cancer resource center and support groups. The Lourdes Cancer Center is accredited by the American College of Surgeons’ Commission on Cancer.

The Acuity Specialty Hospital is a 30-bed facility long term case facility. It serves r seriously ill patients who require extended hospital stays (an average of 25 days) before returning home. Patients are admitted directly from short-stay hospitals, often from intensive care units, with ventilator-dependent respiratory failure or other complex medical conditions that require aggressive and continuous acute-care services. The unit is designed for patients with cardiopulmonary conditions resulting from trauma; a severe medical illness or post-operative problem, or the development of an acute illness superimposed on a chronic illness like malnutrition, cardiac disease or chronic obstructive pulmonary disease (COPD). Patients get the time to heal before being transferred to a rehab hospital or skilled nursing facility.

Behavioral Health: A 10-bed voluntary unit and 18-bed involuntary unit provide patients with various behavioral therapies.

Surgery: Minimally invasive procedures to treat urologic conditions and kidney disease are performed here. Bariatric and orthopedic surgeries also are done at the hospital.
