= Union Township, Camden County, New Jersey =

Coordinates: 39.873°N 75.083°W

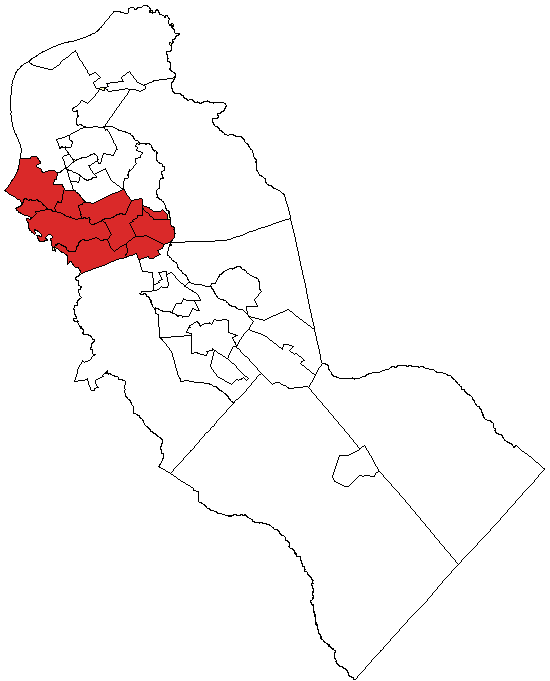
The approximate area of Union Township (1844) in relation to modern Camden County

Union Township is a now dissolved township which existed from 1831 to 1868 and was located in present-day Camden County, New Jersey.

Union Township was formed by an Act of the New Jersey Legislature on November 15, 1831, while the area was still part of Gloucester County, taking territory from Gloucester Township and incorporating all of Gloucestertown Township.

When Camden County was separated from Gloucester County on March 13, 1844, Union Township was one of the original Camden County municipalities. On March 6, 1855, a new township, Centre Township, was formed from Union Township's territory. On February 25, 1868, the township was dissolved and the remaining land was chartered as Gloucester City.

== Current municipalities within the bounds of Union Township ==
- Barrington Borough
- Bellmawr Borough
- Brooklawn Borough
- Gloucester City
- Haddon Heights Borough
- Lawnside Borough
- Magnolia Borough
- Mount Ephraim Borough
- Runnemede Borough
- Tavistock Borough

== See also ==
- List of historical Camden County, New Jersey municipalities
