= Township Act of 1798 =

1798 legislation enacted in the U.S. state of New Jersey

The Township Act of 1798 ("An Act incorporating the Inhabitants of Townships, designating their Powers, and regulating their Meetings", PL 1798, p. 289) is an Act passed by New Jersey Legislature on February 21, 1798, that formally incorporated 104 municipalities in 13 counties in New Jersey. It set standards on format for government of townships. The act was largely replaced by subsequent laws.

== Township government ==
The Act created townships with a direct democracy form that resembled the early New England town meeting. At the annual township meeting, people were able to vote if they met all of the following criteria

- white male
- over the age of 21
- citizens of New Jersey
- residents of the township for at least 6 months
- and for at least a year paid
  - taxes on an owned house or
  - $5 in taxes on a rented house

The Act explicitly allowed the township meetings to manage the township by improving common land, pass municipal laws and ordinances, and to maintain the roads. The people also elected officials for one year: a clerk, tax collector, at least three "freeholders", and a judge.

== Original townships and counties ==
In the following list, the 104 original incorporated townships are provided, along with the original 13 counties which they were part of in 1798. 88 of the original townships still survive. Some of the townships are now in different counties. The number in the brackets indicate the year the township was originally founded or of its earliest mention.

=== Bergen County ===
- Bergen (1661; defunct)
- Franklin (1771; defunct; now Wyckoff, New Jersey)
- Hackensack (1693; defunct)
- Harrington (1775; defunct. original township broke into pieces; succeeded by Northvale)
- New Barbadoes (1693; defunct. became modern day Hackensack, which is the county seat)
- Pompton (1797; defunct)
- Saddle River (1716)

=== Burlington County ===
- Burlington (1677; county seat)
- Chester (1688; now Maple Shade; was also known as Cropwell)
- Chesterfield (1688)
- Evesham (1688)
- Little Egg Harbour (1740; now part of Ocean County)
- Mansfield (1688)
- New Hanover (1723)
- Northampton (1688)
- Nottingham (1688)
- Springfield (1688)
- Willingborough (1688)

=== Cape May County ===
- Lower (1723)
- Middle (1723; county seat)
- Upper (1723)

=== Cumberland County ===
- Deerfield (1748)
- Downe (1772)
- Fairfield (1697)
- Greenwich (1748)
- Hopewell (1748)
- Maurice River (1748)
- Stoe Creek (1708)

=== Essex County ===
- Acquakcanonk (1693; defunct with the creation of Clifton in Passaic County)
- Caldwell (1798; now Fairfield)
- Elizabeth (1693; defunct; successor Elizabeth Township made county seat Union County)
- Newark (1693; county seat)
- Springfield (1794; now part of Union County)
- Westfield (1794; now Union County)

=== Gloucester County ===
- Deptford (1695)
- Egg-Harbour (1693; now part of Atlantic County)
- Galloway (1774; now part of Atlantic County)
- Gloucester (1695; now part of Camden County)
- Gloucestertown (1695; defunct)
- Greenwich (1695)
- Newton (1695; defunct)
- Waterford (1695)
- Weymouth (1798)
- Woolwich (1767)

=== Hunterdon County ===
- Alexandria (1765)
- Amwell (1708; defunct and split as of 1846)
- Bethlehem (1730)
- Hopewell (1700)
- Kingwood (1749)
- Lebanon (1731)
- Maidenhead (1697; now Lawrence Township in Mercer County)
- Readington (1730)
- Tewksbury (1755)
- Trenton (1719; state capitol and county seat of Mercer County)

=== Middlesex County ===
- East Windsor (1797; now part of Mercer County)
- North Brunswick (1779)
- Perth Amboy (1693)
- Piscataway (1666)
- South Amboy (1782)
- South Brunswick (1779)
- West Windsor (1797; now part of Mercer County)
- Woodbridge (1669)

=== Monmouth County ===
- Dover (1768; renamed Toms River; county seat of now Ocean County)
- Freehold (1693; split)
- Middletown (1693)
- Shrewsbury (1693)
- Stafford (1750; now part of Ocean County)
- Upper Freehold (1731)

=== Morris County ===
- Hanover (1720)
- Mendham (1749)
- Morris (1740; county seat)
- Pequanack (1720)
- Roxbury (1740)
- Washington (1798)

=== Salem County ===
- Elsinboro (1701)
- Lower Alloway's Creek (1767)
- Lower Penn's Neck (1792) (now Pennsville Township, New Jersey)
- Mannington (1701)
- Pilesgrove (1701)
- Pittsgrove (1769)
- Salem (1798; county seat)
- Upper Alloway's Creek (1767)
- Upper Penn's Neck (1721; now Carneys Point Township, New Jersey)

=== Somerset County ===
- Bedminster (1749)
- Bernards (1760)
- Bridgewater (1749)
- Franklin (1798)
- Hillsborough (1771)
- Montgomery (1798)

=== Sussex County ===
- Byram (1798)
- Frankford (1797)
- Greenwich (1738; now part of Warren County)
- Hardwick (1750; now part of Warren County)
- Hardyston (1762)
- Independence (1782; now part of Warren County)
- Knowlton (1763; now part of Warren County)
- Mansfield (1754; now part of Warren County)
- Montague (1759)
- Newton (1751)
- Oxford (1754; now part of Warren County)
- Sandyston (1762)
- Vernon (1793)
- Walpack (1731)
- Wantage (1754)

== Changes since 1798 ==
=== New counties and townships ===
Since the act was passed, eight additional counties were created: Atlantic County in 1837, Camden County in 1837, Hudson County in 1840, Mercer County in 1838, Ocean County in 1850, Passaic County 1837, Union County in 1857, and Warren County in 1824, for a total of 21 counties.

=== Laws ===
The Township Act of 1899 provided sweeping changes. The township meeting, a staple of townships for the previous 101 years, was eliminated in favor of consolidating in the hands of a greatly strengthened township committee, which were given policy-making power. The only provision left unchanged was regarding money. The people of a township keep the power to determine the direction of the power of the money, albeit through a ballot box instead of through a township meeting.

The original provisions of the Township Act of 1798 have largely been replaced by several acts in the 20th century. Most of the modern New Jersey townships are incorporated under the 1911 Walsh Act, 1923 Municipal Manager Law and the various forms offered under the 1950 Faulkner Act.
