= Tavistock, New Jersey =

Borough in Camden County, New Jersey, US

- Borough
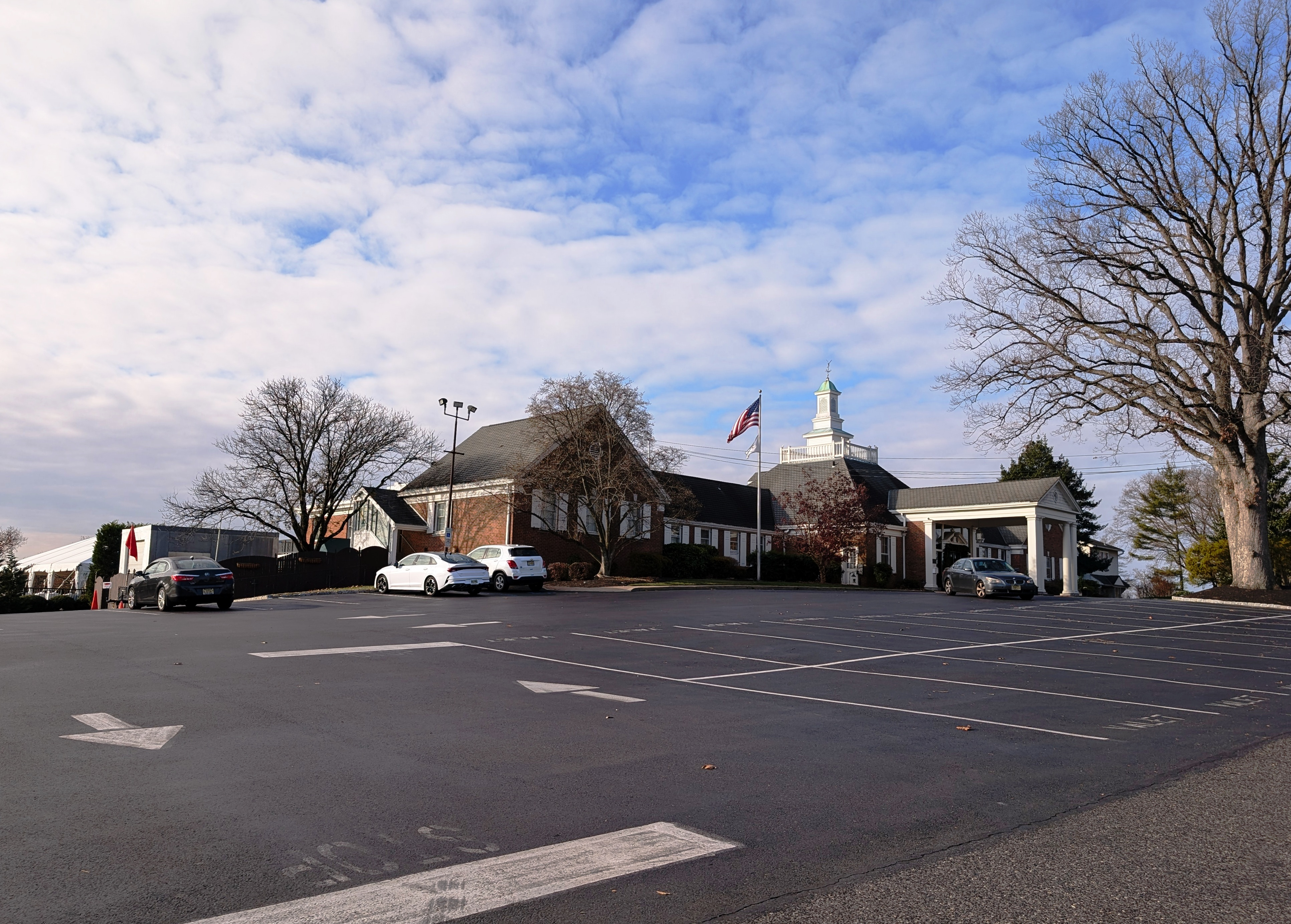
- Tavistock Country Club clubhouse

- Seal

- Tavistock highlighted in Camden County. Inset: Location of Camden County highlighted in the State of New Jersey.

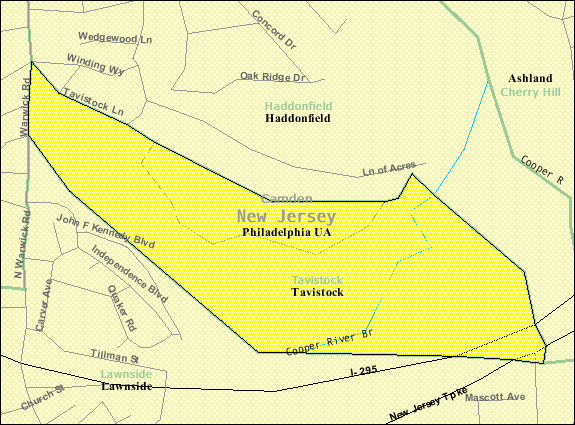
- Census Bureau map of Tavistock, New Jersey

- Location in Camden County Location in New Jersey Location in the United States
- Coordinates: 39.876265°N 75.029807°W
- Country: United States
- State: New Jersey
- County: Camden
- Incorporated: February 16, 1921

Government
  - Type: Walsh Act
  - Body: Board of Commissioners
  - Mayor: Joseph Del Duca (term ends December 31, 2025)
  - Administrator / Municipal clerk: Denise K. Moules

Area
  - Total: 0.27 sq mi (0.71 km^{2})
  - Land: 0.27 sq mi (0.71 km^{2})
  - Water: 0.0039 sq mi (0.01 km^{2}) 1.07%
  - Rank: 555th of 565 in state 34th of 37 in county
- Elevation: 46 ft (14 m)

Population (2020)
  - Total: 9
  - Estimate (2023): 7
  - Rank: 564th of 565 in state 37th of 37 in county
  - Density: 33/sq mi (13/km^{2})
  - Rank: 558th of 565 in state 36th of 37 in county
- Time zone: UTC−05:00 (Eastern (EST))
  - Summer (DST): UTC−04:00 (Eastern (EDT))
- ZIP Code: 08033 – Haddonfield
- Area code: 856
- FIPS code: 3400772240
- GNIS feature ID: 0885416
- Website: www.tavistocknj.org

Tavistock is a borough in Camden County, in the U.S. state of New Jersey. As of the 2020 United States census, the borough's population was 9, an increase of 4 (+80.0%) from the 2010 census count of 5, which in turn reflected a decline of 19 (−79.2%) from the 24 counted in the 2000 census. As of the 2020 census, Tavistock's population was the second-smallest municipal population in the state of New Jersey; Walpack Township had a population of 7.

Tavistock was incorporated as a borough by an act of the New Jersey Legislature on February 16, 1921. Its territory was drawn from portions of the now-defunct Centre Township. The name of the borough came from the estate in England of a family of early settlers.

The borough was formed in order to allow the members of Tavistock Country Club to play golf on Sundays by members of the Victor Talking Machine Company. This was prohibited at the Haddon Country Club, which was governed by a local blue law prohibiting sporting activities on Sundays. Tavistock's secession from Haddonfield, New Jersey, the original site of the club, is said to have been driven by the fact that Haddonfield was (and remains) a dry borough, though Tavistock was formed in 1921 during Prohibition when liquor would have been banned. Members of the club included State Senator Joseph Wallworth and Assembly Speaker T. Harry Rowland, who helped push the bill that created the new municipality to unanimous approval in the New Jersey Legislature.

== Geography ==
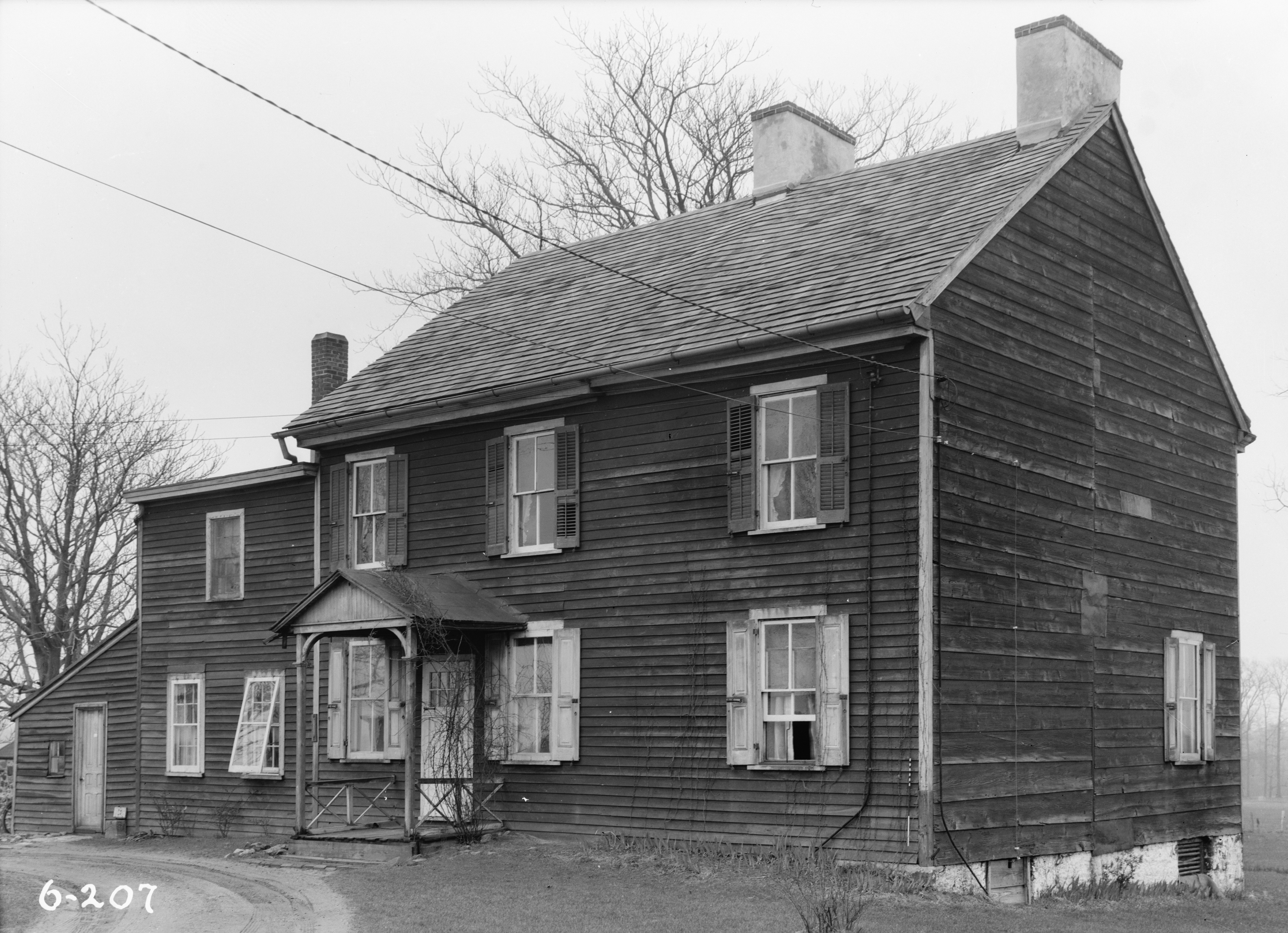
Gill Homestead in Tavistock in 1936

According to the United States Census Bureau, the borough had a total area of 0.28 square miles (0.71 km^{2}), including 0.27 square miles (0.71 km^{2}) of land and <0.01 square miles (0.01 km^{2}) of water (1.07%).

The borough borders Barrington, Haddonfield, and Lawnside.

== Transportation ==
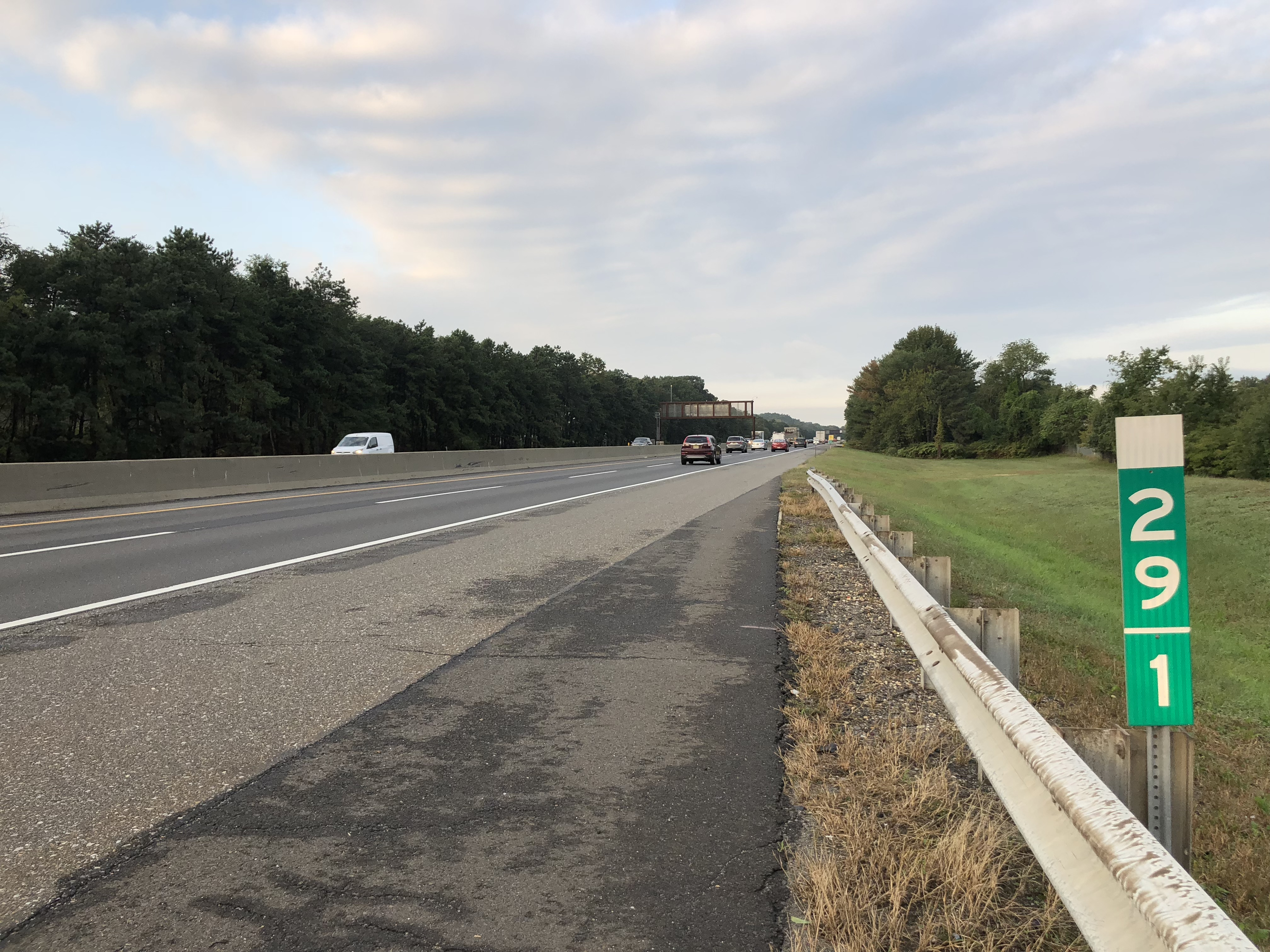
The southbound New Jersey Turnpike in Tavistock

=== Roads and highways ===
As of May 2010, the borough had a total of 0.17 miles (0.27 km) of roadways, all of which is maintained by the New Jersey Department of Transportation.

Interstate 295 passes through but the nearest interchange is immediately over the border in neighboring Haddonfield. The New Jersey Turnpike runs briefly through Tavistock, although the nearest exit is for Bellmawr and Runnemede. The road serving the borough's residences and the country club, Tavistock Lane, sits on the border of Tavistock and Haddonfield.

=== Public transportation ===
NJ Transit local bus service is available on the 451 route between Camden and the Lindenwold station.

== Demographics ==
Historical population
Census	Pop.	Note	%±
1930	20		—
1940	13		−35.0%
1950	15		15.4%
1960	10		−33.3%
1970	12		20.0%
1980	9		−25.0%
1990	35		288.9%
2000	24		−31.4%
2010	5		−79.2%
2020	9		80.0%
2023 (est.)	7	▼	−22.2%
Population sources: 1930–2000 1930; 1940–2000 2000; 2010 2020

=== 2010 census ===
The 2010 United States Census counted 5 people in 3 households. Two households consisted of married couples and the third was a male over 65 years of age living alone. The population density was 19.7 per square mile (7.6/km2). The borough contained 3 housing units at an average density of 11.8 per square mile (4.6/km2). All residents were white. Two residents were aged 25 to 44 and three were older than 65. The median age was 66.3 years.

== Government ==
=== Local government ===
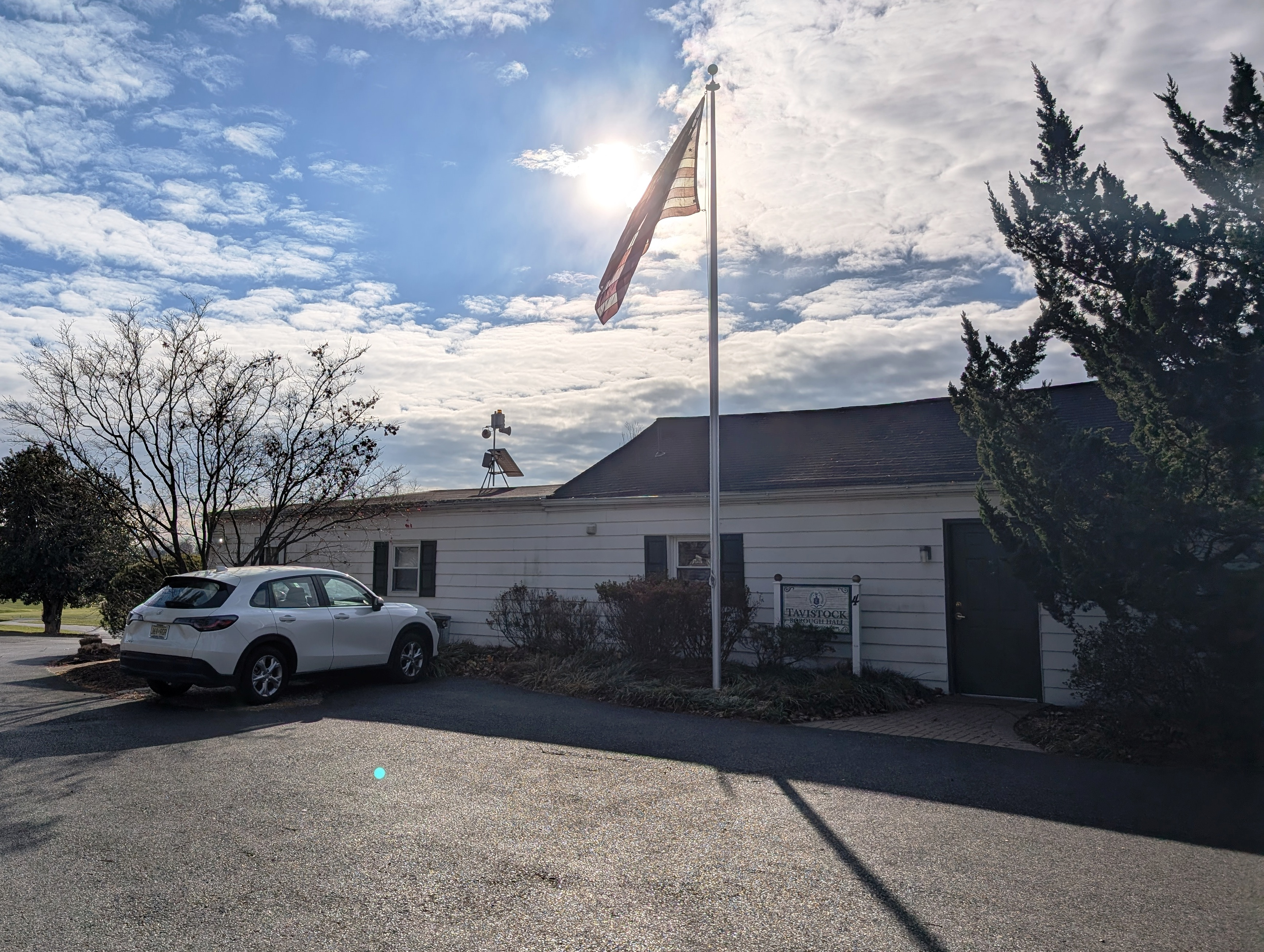
Tavistock Borough Hall inside the confines of the country club

Tavistock operates under the Walsh Act form of New Jersey municipal government. The borough is one of 30 municipalities (of the 564) statewide that use the commission form of government. The governing body is comprised of three non-partisan commissioners, who are elected at-large on a non-partisan basis to concurrent four-year terms of office as part of the May municipal election. Each commissioner is assigned a specific department to head in addition to their legislative functions and one commissioner is chosen to serve as mayor. Tavistock has been governed under the Walsh Act by a three-member commission, since 1928.

As of 2023, Tavistock's commissioners are Mayor Joseph Del Duca, Colin Mack-Allen and Mindy Del Duca, all serving concurrent terms of office ending December 31, 2025.

In 2018, the borough had an average property tax bill of $31,376, the highest in the county, compared to an average bill of $8,767 statewide and more than double the average bill of $15,182 in runner-up Haddonfield.

=== Federal, state and county representation ===
United States presidential election results for Tavistock
Year	Republican		Democratic		Third party(ies)	
Year	No.	%	No.	%	No.	%
2024	4	50.00%	4	50.00%	0	0.00%
2020	0	0.00%	5	100.00%	0	0.00%
2016	1	12.50%	5	62.50%	2	25.00%
2012	2	66.67%	1	33.33%	0	0.00%
2008	5	71.43%	2	28.57%	0	0.00%
2004	8	88.89%	1	11.11%	0	0.00%

Gubernatorial election results for Tavistock
Year	Republican		Democratic		Third party(ies)	
Year	No.	%	No.	%	No.	%
2025	4	50.00%	4	50.00%	0	0.00%
2021	2	40.00%	3	60.00%	0	0.00%
2017	3	100.00%	0	0.00%	0	0.00%
2013	1	100.00%	0	0.00%	0	0.00%
2009	5	100.00%	0	0.00%	0	0.00%
2005	5	71.43%	2	28.57%	0	0.00%

Tavistock is located in the 1st Congressional District and is part of New Jersey's 6th state legislative district.

For the 119th United States Congress, New Jersey's 1st congressional district is represented by Donald Norcross (D, Camden). New Jersey is represented in the United States Senate by Democrats Cory Booker (Newark, term ends 2027) and Andy Kim (Moorestown, term ends 2031).

For the 2026–2027 session, the 6th legislative district of the New Jersey Legislature is represented in the State Senate by James Beach (D, Voorhees Township) and in the General Assembly by Louis Greenwald (D, Voorhees Township) and Melinda Kane (D, Cherry Hill).

Camden County is governed by a Board of County Commissioners composed of seven members chosen at-large in partisan elections for three-year terms on a staggered basis by the residents of the county, with either two or three seats up for election each year as part of the November general election. At a reorganization meeting held in January after each election, the newly constituted Board of Commissioners selects one member to serve as Director and another as Deputy Director, each serving a one-year term in that role. As of 2025, Camden County's Commissioners are: Commissioner Director Louis Cappelli Jr. (D, Collingswood, 2026), Commissioner Deputy Director Edward T. McDonnell (D, Pennsauken Township, 2025), Virginia Ruiz Betteridge (D, Runnemede, 2025), Almar Dyer (D, Pennsauken Township, 2027), Melinda Kane (D, Cherry Hill, 2027), Jeffrey L. Nash (D, Winslow Township, 2027), and Jonathan L. Young Sr. (D, Berlin Township, 2026).

Camden County's constitutional officers are: Clerk Pamela Rosen Lampitt (D, Cherry Hill, 2029) Sheriff Chuck Billingham (D, Gloucester City, 2027) and Surrogate Michelle Gentek-Mayer (D, Gloucester Township, 2025).

=== Politics ===
As of March 2011, there were a total of seven registered voters in Tavistock, of which none were registered as Democrats, six (85.7%) were registered as Republicans, and one (14.3%) was registered as Unaffiliated. There were no voters registered to other parties.

United States Senate election results for Tavistock1
Year	Republican		Democratic		Third party(ies)	
Year	No.	%	No.	%	No.	%
2024	5	62.50%	3	37.50%	0	0.00%
2018	3	75.00%	1	25.00%	0	0.00%
2012	2	66.67%	1	33.33%	0	0.00%
2006	6	85.71%	1	14.29%	0	0.00%

United States Senate election results for Tavistock2
Year	Republican		Democratic		Third party(ies)	
Year	No.	%	No.	%	No.	%
2020	4	80.00%	1	20.00%	0	0.00%
2014	3	60.00%	2	40.00%	0	0.00%
2008	6	85.71%	1	14.29%	0	0.00%

No votes were cast in the 2013 United States Senate special election in New Jersey.

== Education ==
Tavistock is a non-operating school district. Public school students in Tavistock are served by the Haddonfield Public Schools in the adjoining community of Haddonfield as part of a sending/receiving relationship. As of the 2018–2019 school year, the district, comprised of five schools, had an enrollment of 2,749 students and 215.2 classroom teachers (on an FTE basis), for a student–teacher ratio of 12.8:1.

Schools in the district (with 2018–2019 enrollment data from the National Center for Education Statistics) are Central Elementary School with 419 students in grades K–5, Elizabeth Haddon Elementary School with 367 students in grades K–5, J. Fithian Tatem Elementary School with 422 students in grades Pre-K–5, Haddonfield Middle School with 659 students in grades 6–8 and Haddonfield Memorial High School with 869 students in grades 9–12.

== Notable people ==
People who were born in, residents of, or otherwise closely associated with Tavistock include:

- John Aglialoro (born 1943), businessman and film producer
- Joan Carter (born 1943), businesswoman and philanthropist
