= Centre Township, New Jersey =

Coordinates: 39°53′14″N 75°06′59″W

Historical population
Census	Pop.	Note	%±
1860	1,305		—
1870	1,718		31.6%
1880	1,538		−10.5%
1890	1,834		19.2%
1900	2,192		19.5%
1910	3,200	*	46.0%
1920	4,004	*	25.1%
Population sources:1850-1900 1850-1920 1860-1870; 1870 1880-1890; 1890-1910 1910-1930

Centre Township was a township that existed in Camden County, New Jersey from 1855 through 1926.

Centre Township was incorporated as a township by an Act of the New Jersey Legislature on March 6, 1855, from portions of the now-defunct Union Township:

"Beginning in the middle of Great Timber Creek at the mouth of the southerly branch of Little Timber Creek; thence along the middle of Little Timber Creek to a point where the old King’s Highway crossed the same; thence northerly along the highway to the southwest corner of Cedar Grove Cemetery and corner of James H. Brick’s land; thence along said line and by the lands of Aaron H. Hurley, crossing the Mt. Ephraim Road to the corner of the lands of John Brick, deceased; thence along the lands of Brick and John C. Champion and John R. Brick to Newton Creek, on the line of Newton Township; thence eastwardly by Newton Creek, on the line of Union and Newton, until it strikes the line of the townships of Union and Delaware; thence up the same to Burrough's Bridge; thence on the middle of the highway and on boundary line between the townships of Union and Gloucester to Clements Bridge, on the Great Timber Creek; thence down the middle of the said creek to the place of beginning."

Over the years, portions of Centre Township were taken to create several new municipalities:

- Haddon Heights on March 2, 1904 (also portions of Haddon Township)
- Magnolia on April 14, 1915 (also portions of Clementon)
- Barrington on March 27, 1917
- Tavistock on February 16, 1921
- Brooklawn on March 11, 1924
- Bellmawr on March 23, 1926
- Mount Ephraim on March 23, 1926
- Runnemede on March 23, 1926
- Lawnside on March 24, 1926 (also portions of Barrington)

With the creation of Lawnside, Centre Township was officially dissolved.

== See also ==
- List of historical Camden County, New Jersey municipalities
