= Stockton Township, New Jersey =

Former township of New Jersey

Coordinates: 39.9439°N 75.0764°W

Stockton Township was a township that existed in Camden County, New Jersey, United States, from 1859 until its dissolution in 1899. However, in the 1850 US Census, Stockton Township is the given enumeration district.

Stockton Township was incorporated by an Act of the New Jersey Legislature on February 23, 1859, from portions of Delaware Township (now Cherry Hill Township).

On March 3, 1874, the borough of Merchantville was formed from portions of the township. Pennsauken Township was established on February 18, 1892.

Stockton was reincorporated as a town on May 1, 1894, based on the results of a referendum held on March 22, 1894.

On March 24, 1899, the remaining portion of Stockton was annexed by the City of Camden, thereby forming "East Camden" and its constituent neighborhoods of Cramer Hill, Pavonia, Beideman, Stockton, etc. Stockton Township was dissolved.

== See also ==
- List of historical Camden County, New Jersey municipalities
