= George C. Burling =

Union Army general (1834–1885)

George Childs Burling
- Born: February 17, 1834; Burlington County, New Jersey, U.S.
- Died: December 24, 1885 (aged 51); Philadelphia, Pennsylvania, U.S.
- Burial place: Harleigh Cemetery, Camden, New Jersey
- Military career
- Allegiance: United States of America; Union
- Branch: Union Army
- Rank: Colonel; Brevet Brigadier General
- Conflicts: American Civil War; Second Battle of Bull Run (WIA); Battle of Chancellorsville (WIA); Battle of Gettysburg

George Childs Burling (February 17, 1834 – December 24, 1885) was a United States Union Army officer during the American Civil War, serving mostly as colonel and commander of the 6th New Jersey Volunteer Infantry. Burling was born in Burlington County, New Jersey, raised on his father's farm, and educated at a private school in Norristown, Pennsylvania. He was a coal merchant and a militia officer before the war. Burling's militia company was mustered into the volunteer service for a three-month term in July 1861, but it became Company F of the 6th New Jersey with a three-year enlistment on September 9, 1861. Burling became the regiment's major on March 19, 1862, and lieutenant colonel on May 7 of that year. Burling was wounded at the Second Battle of Bull Run in August 1862.

When Colonel Gershom Mott, commander of the 6th New Jersey, became a general, Burling was promoted to colonel. Burling commanded the regiment at the Battle of Chancellorsville, where he was wounded. His most notable service was as commander of his brigade (once known as the "Second New Jersey Brigade" of III Corps (ACW) but reorganized to include troops from other states) at the July 1863 Battle of Gettysburg. His brigade was in reserve at the beginning of the second day's fighting on the left flank of the Army of the Potomac, but regiments were moved about separately as higher commanders saw fit. One regiment, 6th New Jersey, fought near Devil's Den. The 8th New Jersey and 115th Pennsylvania fought in the Wheatfield. The 7th New Jersey and 2nd New Hampshire supported artillery deployed at the Peach Orchard. 5th New Jersey was on the Emmitsburg Road. The brigade entered the battle with an estimated 1,396 troops and lost, according to Burling, 513 officers and men.

Burling resigned on March 4, 1864, because of ill health. On December 18, 1867, President Andrew Johnson nominated Burling for appointment to the grade of brevet brigadier general of volunteers, to rank from March 13, 1865, for "gallant and meritorious services in the Battle of Gettysburg, Pa," and the United States Senate confirmed the appointment on February 14, 1868.

Burling married in October 1862. After the war, he and his wife lived on a farm outside Philadelphia. Burling was employed for a time by the Pennsylvania Railroad and died at his home in Philadelphia of pulmonary cancer two decades after the war ended. He was interred at Mount Vernon Cemetery in Philadelphia on December 28, 1885, and later reinterred in Harleigh Cemetery, Camden, New Jersey, in the Trinity Section, Lot 118. He is one of three Civil War Union Brevet Generals interred in the cemetery, along with Colonel William Joyce Sewell of the 5th New Jersey Volunteer Infantry and Colonel Timothy C. Moore of the 34th New Jersey Volunteer Infantry.

== See also ==
- List of American Civil War brevet generals (Union)
