= Joseph F. Wallworth =

American politician

Joseph F. Wallworth (February 24, 1876 – August 20, 1933) was an American businessman, realtor, and politician from New Jersey.

== Life ==
Wallworth was born on February 24, 1876, in Philadelphia, Pennsylvania, the son of Joseph Wallworth and Georgiana Dean. His father was an English immigrant from Manchester, England.

Wallworth attended public school in Philadelphia and Upland. When he was fifteen, he entered his father's firm, dealers in cotton and wool waste. He was a road salesman for the firm for several years, and was later admitted to the firm. In 1914, he took over the business and ran it himself. The firm was known as J. Wallworth & Sons. He resided in Haddonfield, New Jersey.

Wallworth was a member of the Camden County Republican Executive Committee. In 1918, he was elected to the New Jersey General Assembly as a Republican, serving as one of the three representatives for Camden County. He served in the Assembly in 1919 and 1920. In 1920, he was elected to the New Jersey Senate, representing Camden County. He served in the Senate in 1921, 1922, and 1923. He was chosen President of the Senate in 1923.

In 1921, Wallworth sold his firm and became a realtor, working in real estate development in Camden County. He maintained offices in Camden and Ocean City. After he finished his term in the Senate, he became chairman of the Republican County Committee. He later became chairman of the Camden County Park Commission.

Wallworth was president of the Haddonfield Republican Club and a member of the Shriners, the Elks, the Union League of Philadelphia, the Freemasons, and the Tavistock Country Club. During World War I, he was chairman of the Camden Red Cross campaign and was active in the Salvation Army drive. He was a member of the Presbyterian Church. In 1906, he married Emma W. Gerber of Wilmington, Delaware. They had one child, Josephine Ellen.

Wallworth shot himself at his home on August 20, 1933. The pallbearers at his funeral included former U.S. Senator David Baird Jr., Congressman Charles A. Wolverton, State Senator Albert S. Woodruff, Mayor Roy R. Stewart, former mayor Winfield S. Price, J. David Stern, and William T. Read. His funeral was in the Harleigh Cemetery-Mausoleum.

Political offices
Preceded by William B. Mackay Jr.	President of the New Jersey Senate; 1923	Succeeded by Firman M. Reeves
