= John Aglialoro =

American businessman and film producer

- Born: November 27, 1943 (age 82); Philadelphia, Pennsylvania, US
- Education: Temple University
- Board member of: Atlas Society; Museum of the American Revolution; Barnes Foundation
- Spouse: Joan Carter (m. 1979)

John Aglialoro (born November 27, 1943) is an American businessman and film producer. He is an entrepreneur who has owned and operated a variety of businesses, primarily in the health and fitness industries, as chairman and co-founder of UM Holdings Ltd. (formerly United Medical Corporation) of Haddonfield, New Jersey. Owner of the movie rights to Ayn Rand's Atlas Shrugged, Aglialoro is CEO of Atlas Distribution, which he founded to distribute films using the technology developed to bring Rand's novel to the screen.

== Education and career ==
Born in Philadelphia the youngest of four children, Aglialoro grew up in Collingswood, New Jersey and was the first member of his family to attend college. He graduated from Collingswood High School in 1961 and Temple University in 1965. Aglialoro served as Chairman of Cybex International, a manufacturer of commercial exercise equipment, from 1983 to 2016 when UM Holdings sold Cybex to Brunswick Corporation (NYSE: BC). He was Chairman of EHE International, a national provider of physical examinations, from 1987 to 2016 when the business was sold to Summit Partners.

== Boards and achievements ==
Aglialoro is on the Board of Trustees of The Atlas Society, an objectivist think-tank, The Museum of the American Revolution, and the Barnes Foundation, a renowned collection of impressionist art by Philadelphia art collector Albert C. Barnes (1872–1951). He serves as co-chair of the Foundation for Individual Liberty, with a mission to support free markets, limited government and individual liberty. Aglialoro is the former mayor of Tavistock a borough in Camden County, New Jersey (population 5 in 2010). Aglialoro has been profiled by Forbes and Fortune magazines and was praised in a Forbes/CNN blog post. He received the Distinguished Citizen Award from the Freedoms Foundation at Valley Forge in 2018.

== Filmography ==
During the almost two decades after acquiring the movie rights to Atlas Shrugged from the Estate of Ayn Rand, Aglialoro optioned the rights to several notable producers. In 2011, facing expiration of the rights, Aglialoro decided to finance the production and distribution himself to bring the epic novel to the screen. Since the book is more than 1200 pages separated into three parts, he and fellow producer Harmon Kaslow decided that filming each part separately would enable more of the book's message to be delivered cinematically. On April 15, 2011, Atlas Shrugged: Part I premiered and ultimately played on 700 screens in the US, earning $5M at the box office. Aglialoro shared screenplay credit for his work on the script. With the participation of additional executive producers, Aglialoro produced Atlas Shrugged: Part II, which debuted in October 2012 on 1200 screens. The third and final part of the trilogy, Atlas Shrugged Part III: Who Is John Galt?, opened on 200 screens. The movies were critically panned but Aglialoro received an award from the Ronald Reagan Presidential Foundation, and an Anthem Film Festival Award (for filmmakers who care about individuality and libertarian ideals). Aglialoro continues to consider partnering with other producers for a re-make or multi-part feature.

Using the technology tools developed for the distribution process required for Atlas Shrugged, Aglialoro formed Atlas Distribution in 2014. The company provides comprehensive services for theatrical film distribution through is proprietary Cinema CloudWorks system.

== Personal life ==
Aglialoro is a poker enthusiast, winning the US Poker Championship in 2004. He resides in Philadelphia with his wife and business partner, Joan Carter.
