= List of historical Camden County, New Jersey municipalities =

This list of historical municipalities in Camden County, New Jersey includes cities, townships, and boroughs. It also includes the years they were formed as local administrative units, and years in which existing municipalities ceded land for the formation of new ones. Some municipalities listed have either been subsumed into other municipalities, or have changed their names.

Camden County was formed in 1844 from part of Gloucester County, containing the City of Camden along with Delaware, Gloucester, Newton, Union, Waterford, and Washington Townships.

There are 37 current municipalities in Camden County, each marked with an * below:

== Cities ==
- Camden* (1844) City became the county seat.

1899: Camden annexed Stockton Town.

- Gloucester City* (1868)

== Townships ==
- Berlin Township* (1910)
- Centre Township (formed in 1855 from part of Union Township)
- Cherry Hill Township* (renamed in 1961)
- Clementon Township (1903) Township formed.

1913: Township ceded land for formation of Laurel Springs.
1925: Borough of Clementon formed from Clementon Township.
1929: Borough of Pine Hill incorporated from Clementon Township.
1941: Clementon Township was dissolved

- Delaware Township (1844) Township was incorporated.

1859: Township ceded land for formation of Stockton.

- Gloucester Township* (1844)

1845: Township ceded land for formation of Winslow.
1903: Township ceded land for formation of Clementon.

- Haddon Township* (1865)
- Monroe Township (1859 - ceded to Gloucester County upon founding)
- Newton Township (1844)

1871: Newton Township was dissolved

- Pennsauken Township* (1892) Township formed.
- Stockton Township (1859) Township was incorporated.

1874: Township ceded land for formation of the borough of Merchantville.
1892: Township ceded land for formation of Pennsauken.
1894: Stockton Township dissolved to form Stockton Town.
1899: Stockton Town was dissolved, annexed into Camden City

- Union Township (1844)
- Voorhees Township* (1899)
- Washington Township (1844)

1871: Washington Township was ceded to Gloucester County

- Waterford Township* (1844)
- Winslow Township* (1845)

== Boroughs ==
- Audubon Borough* (1905)
- Audubon Park Borough* (1947)
- Barrington Borough* (1917)
- Bellmawr Borough* (1926)
- Berlin Borough* (1927)
- Brooklawn Borough* (1924)
- Chesilhurst Borough* (1887)
- Clementon Borough* (1925)
- Collingswood Borough* (1888)
- Gibbsboro Borough* (1924)
- Haddonfield Borough* (1875)
- Haddon Heights Borough* (1904)
- Hi-Nella Borough* (1929)
- Laurel Springs Borough* (1913)
- Lawnside Borough* (1926)
- Lindenwold Borough* (1929)
- Magnolia Borough* (1915)
- Merchantville Borough* (1874) Borough formed from lands ceded by Stockton Township.
- Mount Ephraim Borough* (1926)
- Oaklyn Borough* (1905)
- Pine Hill Borough* (1929)
- Pine Valley Borough* (1929)
- Somerdale Borough* (1929)
- Stratford Borough* (1925)
- Tavistock Borough* (1921)
- Woodlynne Borough* (1901)
