= Harleigh Cemetery =

Historic site in Collingswood, New Jersey

- Location within Camden County, New Jersey
- 39°55′26″N 75°5′23″W
- Location: Camden, New Jersey and Collingswood, New Jersey

History
- Built: 1885

Site notes
- Area: 130 acres (0.53 km^{2})

Harleigh Cemetery is a historic rural cemetery located in Camden, New Jersey, and established in 1885. The Camden County Veterans Cemetery was established in it in 2007. The cemetery covers over 130 acres (0.53 km^{2}) of lush mature grounds on the Cooper River. The cemetery was listed on the New Jersey Register of Historic Places on 1995 (as ID #2829).

== Notable burials ==
- David Baird Sr. (1839–1927), United States senator from New Jersey from 1918–1919.
- David Baird Jr. (1881–1955), United States senator from New Jersey from 1929–1930.
- Henry Charlton Beck (1902–1965), journalist, folklorist, author of New Jersey history books
- Ella Reeve Bloor (1862–1951), labor organizer
- William J. Browning (1850–1920), represented New Jersey's 1st congressional district from 1911–1920.
- Albert E. Burling (1891–1960), justice of the New Jersey Supreme Court from 1947 to 1960.
- George C. Burling (1834–1885), Union Army officer during the American Civil War, serving as Colonel and commander of the 6th New Jersey Volunteer Infantry.
- Ralph W. E. Donges (1875–1974), justice of the New Jersey Supreme Court, 1930 to 1948
- Carl McIntire (1906–2002), founder of and minister in the Bible Presbyterian Church
- Harry Miller (1858–1919), Major League Baseball pitcher
- Charlie Rice (1920–2018), jazz drummer
- William Joyce Sewell (1835–1901), United States senator from New Jersey from 1881–1887 and 1895–1901.
- John F. Starr (1818–1904), United States senator from New Jersey from 1863–1867.
- Nick Virgilio (1928–1989), haiku poet
- Joseph F. Wallworth (1876–1933), president of the New Jersey Senate
- Walt Whitman (1819–1892), essayist and poet
- Charles A. Wolverton (1880–1969), represented New Jersey's 1st congressional district from 1927–1959
