= Tavistock Country Club =

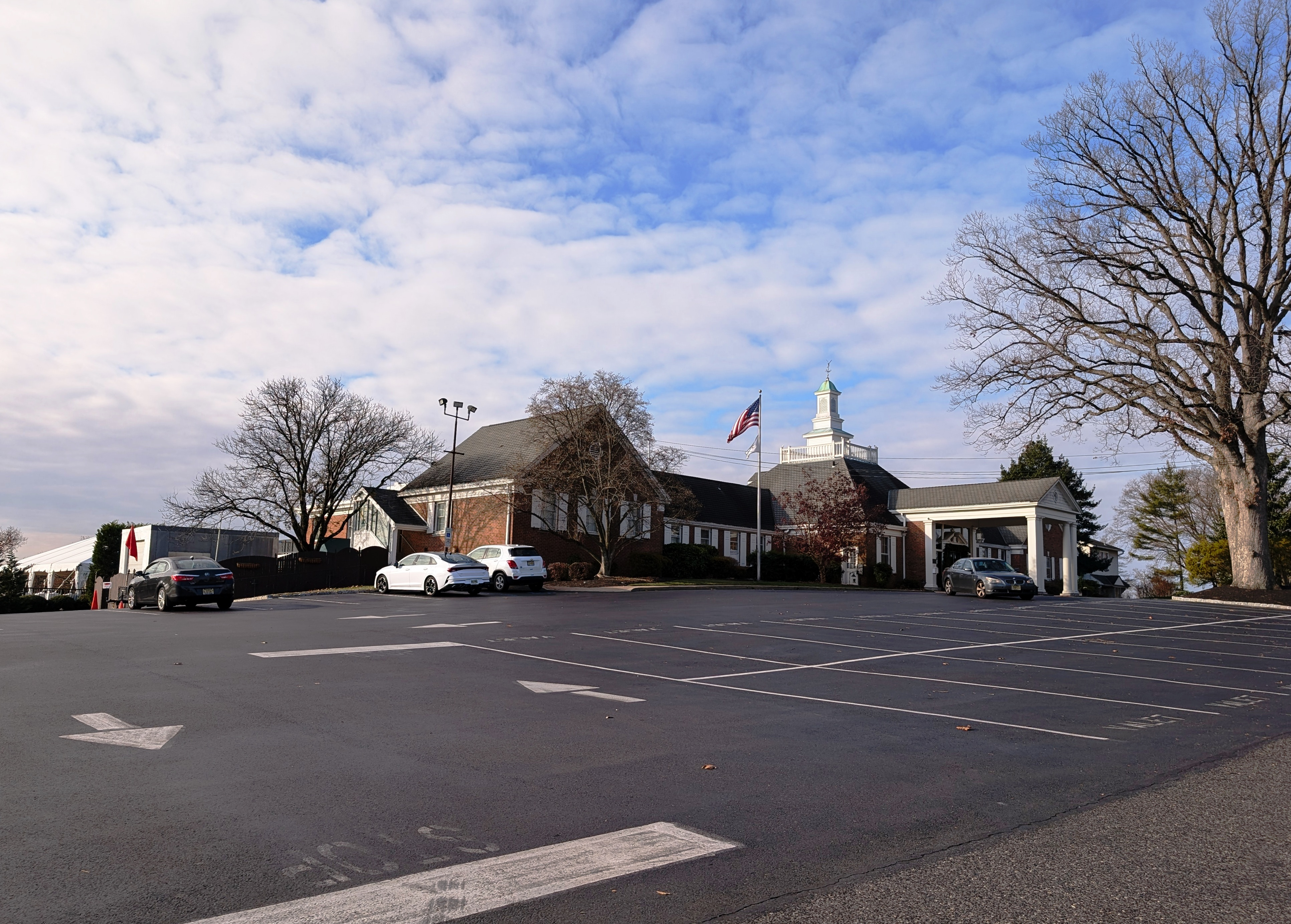
- Clubhouse
- Interactive map of Tavistock Country Club
- 39.878568°N 75.031828°W

Club information
- Location: Tavistock, New Jersey, U.S.
- Established: 1920
- Type: Private
- Tota holes: 18
- Tournaments: U.S. Open qualifier (1975)
- Website: www.tavistockcc.org
- Designed by: Alexander Findlay
- Par: 72
- Length: 6823 (men's tees)
- Course rating: 73.5
- Slope rating: 139

Tavistock Country Club is a private 18-hole golf club located in Tavistock, New Jersey. On December 14, 1920, the club was formally incorporated, and the course was ready for play on June 22, 1921. The course is nestled between Warwick Road and Interstate 295 in Camden County, New Jersey.

The club is where the modern day snowboard was created by Tom Sims.

Tavistock is part of the smallest municipality in New Jersey by population. As of 2020, Tavistock has a population of 9 along with only 3 houses in the small town. These 3 houses paid the highest property tax in New Jersey in 2024; averaging at $37,908.

The Borough of Tavistock was established in 1921 as the club's original municipality, Haddonfield, did not allow for games to be played on Sunday. Reason for the formation of Tavistock was so that members could avoid Haddonfield's no sport law and play on Sundays. Tavistock then split from Haddonfield in 1921, officially being recognized as a municipality by the state of New Jersey.
