= Gloucestertown Township, New Jersey =

Coordinates: 39.873°N 75.083°W

Gloucestertown was a township that existed within the territory of the current Camden County, New Jersey, United States, from 1685 to 1831.

Gloucestertown was formed on September 4, 1685, while the area was still part of Burlington County. On May 26, 1686, it became part of the newly created Gloucester County. It was briefly consolidated with Gloucester Township as of June 13, 1734, but regained its independence in 1739. The township was reestablished by Royal Charter on December 8, 1773.

Gloucestertown Township was incorporated as one of New Jersey's initial group of 104 townships by an Act of the New Jersey Legislature on February 21, 1798.

On November 15, 1831, Union Township was formed, incorporating portions of Gloucester Township and all of Gloucestertown Township. With the creation of Union Township, Gloucestertown Township was dissolved.
