= Joan Carter =

American businesswoman and philanthropist

- Born: Joan Pauline Carter; July 2, 1943 (age 83); Pittsburgh, Pennsylvania
- Education: College of Wooster
- Occupation: President of UM Holdings Ltd
- Board member of: Foundation for Individual Liberty; College of Wooster Emeritus; Founding Forward Emeritus
- Spouse: John Aglialoro (m. 1979)

Joan Carter (born July 2, 1943 in Pittsburgh, Pennsylvania) is an American businessperson and philanthropist. She is the President of UM Holdings Ltd. which she co-founded with John Aglialoro. Since 1973, UM Holdings has owned and operated a variety of business, primarily in the health and fitness industries. UM Holdings was the owner of Cybex International and EHE International, both of which were sold in 2016.

== Education and achievements ==
She is a graduate of The College of Wooster, and was awarded the College's 2005 Distinguished Alumni Award. In 2010, Carter was elected President of The Union League of Philadelphia, the first woman to hold that position in the League's 150 year history. She was also awarded the Temple University 2011 Musser Award, the Adam Smith Award in 2012 by Economics Pennsylvania, the IWF Women Who Make a Difference Award in 2018, in 2018 the Distinguished Citizen Award from the Valley Forge Freedoms Foundation, and was the recipient of the 2026 Union League Crystal Award.

== Boards ==
Carter is Co-Chair of The Foundation for Individual Liberty and Emeritus Trustee for the College of Wooster. and Founding Forward (formerly the Legacy Foundation). She served as Founding Chair of the Legacy Foundation and was Chair of FreedomWorks.. Additionally Carter served on the board of Lourdes Health System., the Reason Foundation, and the Philly Pops. Carter served as director for the Federal Reserve Bank of Philadelphia from 1994 to 2001 and as its chair from 1998 to 2001. She was a director for Carr America (formerly NYSE: CRE) from 2003 to 2006 when Carr was sold to the Blackstone Group. She was vice chairman of the board of Cybex International from 1997 to 2016 when Cybex was sold to Brunswick Corporation in 2016. She was a director from 2001 to 2019 for Penn Mutual Life Insurance Company and chair of that board's marketing committee.

== Personal life ==
Carter is married to John Aglialoro, producer of the Atlas Shrugged movie trilogy, on which Carter served as associate producer. She authored The History of the Atlas Shrugged Movie Trilogy and co-authored Atlas Shrugged: The Novel, the Films, the Philosophy. She has two children, and two step-children, and eight grandchildren.
