= Bellmawr, New Jersey =

Borough in Camden County, New Jersey, US

- Borough
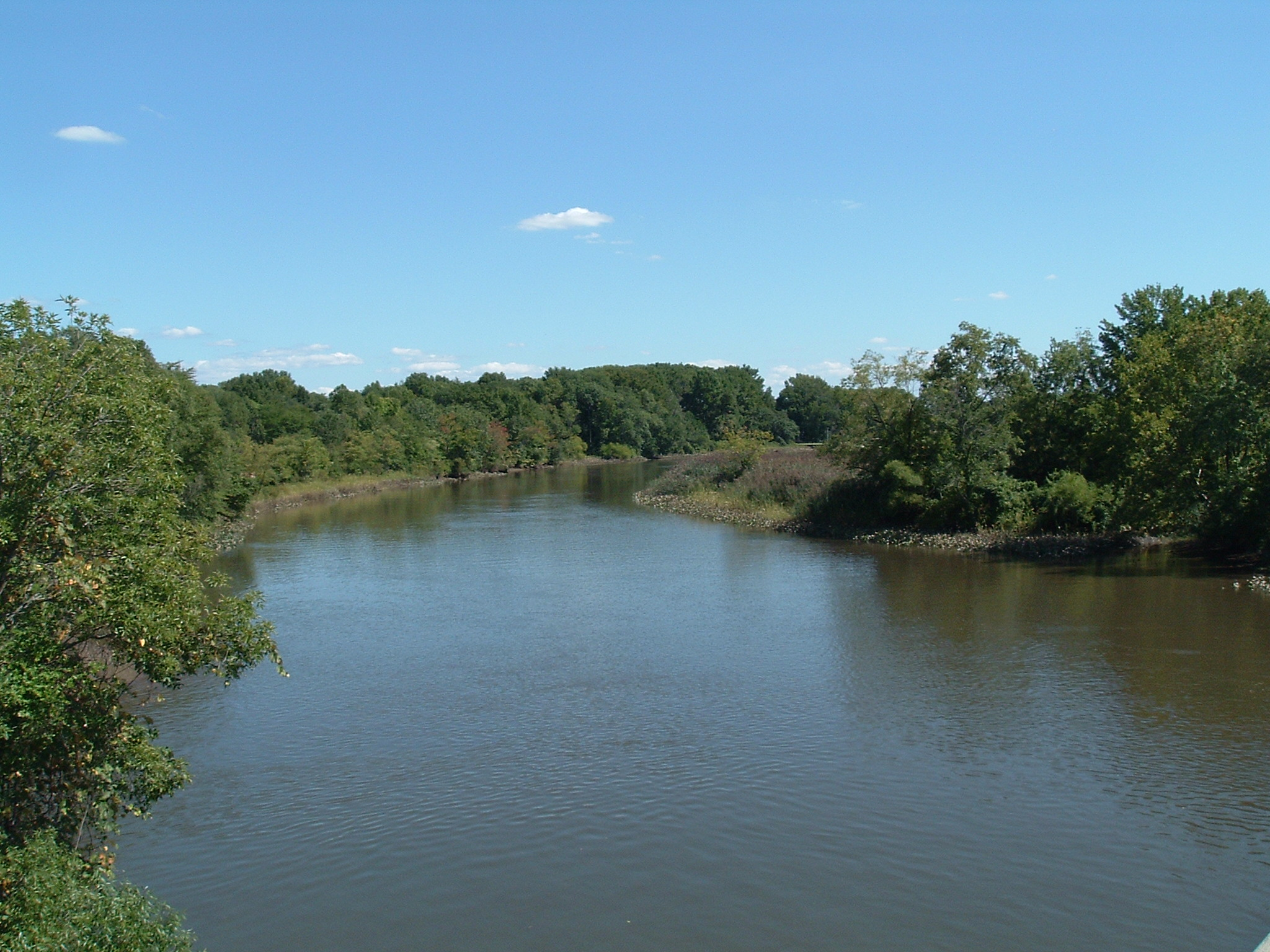
- Big Timber Creek in Bellmawr

- Seal
- Motto: Progress Never Stops
- Location of Bellmawr in Camden County highlighted in red (right). Inset map: Location of Camden County in New Jersey highlighted in orange (left).

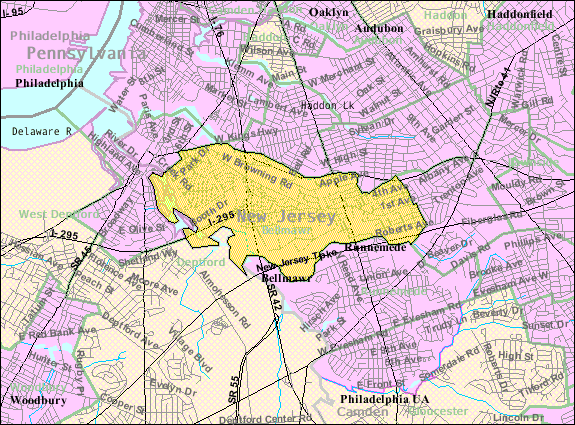
- Census Bureau map of Bellmawr, New Jersey

- Location in Camden County Location in New Jersey Location in the United States
- Coordinates: 39.866356°N 75.09467°W
- Country: United States
- State: New Jersey
- County: Camden
- Incorporated: April 21, 1926
- Named for: Ernest C. Bell

Government
  - Type: Borough
  - Body: Borough Council
  - Mayor: Charles J. "Chuck" Sauter III (D, term ends December 31, 2026)
  - Municipal clerk: Fran Wright

Area
  - Total: 3.11 sq mi (8.05 km^{2})
  - Land: 2.98 sq mi (7.73 km^{2})
  - Water: 0.12 sq mi (0.32 km^{2}) 3.92%
  - Rank: 329nd of 565 in state 12th of 37 in county
- Elevation: 66 ft (20 m)

Population (2020)
  - Total: 11,707
  - Estimate (2024): 11,846
  - Rank: 216th of 565 in state 11th of 37 in county
  - Density: 3,923.3/sq mi (1,514.8/km^{2})
  - Rank: 168th of 565 in state 21st of 37 in county
- Time zone: UTC−05:00 (Eastern (EST))
  - Summer (DST): UTC−04:00 (Eastern (EDT))
- ZIP Codes: 08031, 08099
- Area code: 856
- FIPS code: 3400704750
- GNIS feature ID: 0885154
- Website: www.bellmawr.com

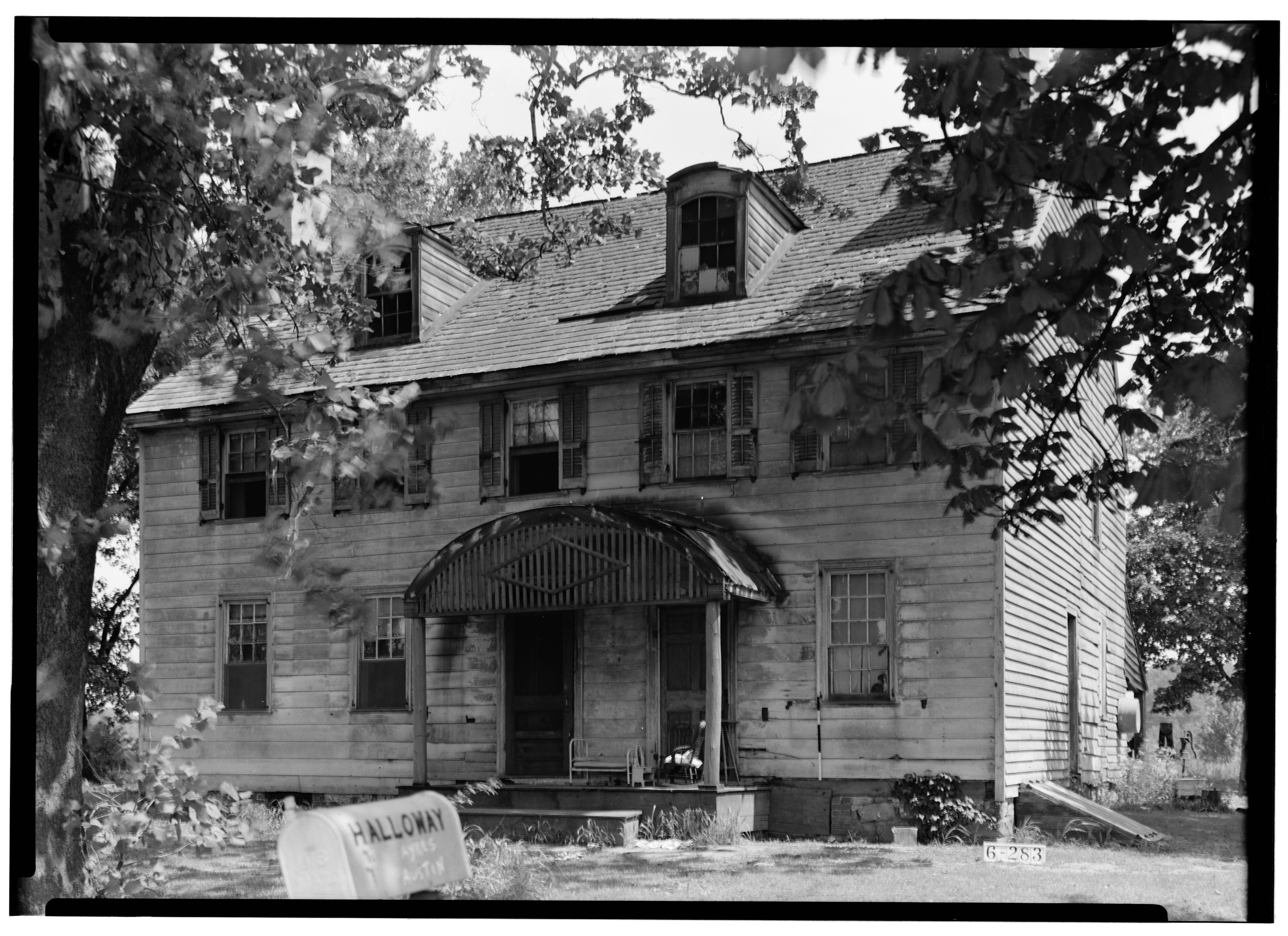
Samuel B. Lippincott House, Creek Road, 1936

Bellmawr (/ˈbɛlmɑːr/ BEL-mar) is a borough in Camden County, in the U.S. state of New Jersey. As of the 2020 United States census, the borough's population was 11,707, an increase of 124 (+1.1%) from the 2010 census count of 11,583, which in turn had reflected an increase of 321 (+2.9%) from the 11,262 counted at the 2000 census.

Bellmawr is home to the main post office for the area, one of the largest in the state of New Jersey, handling an average of 4.5 million pieces of mail daily.

== History ==
Bellmawr was authorized to incorporate as a borough on March 23, 1926, from portions of the now-defunct Centre Township, and was made independent based on the results of a referendum held on April 21, 1926. The boroughs of Mount Ephraim, Runnemede and Lawnside were also created in the same two-day period. The borough was named for Ernest C. Bell, who owned a farm in the area.

In 1966, the Bellmawr Police Department investigated several officers for ticket fixing. The officers were ordered to cooperate with internal investigators and give statements and told that they would be fired if they refused to do so; upon answering the investigators' questions, the officers were criminally charged. In 1967, the Supreme Court of the United States ruled that the officers' self-incriminating statements violated the Fifth Amendment and Fourteenth Amendment, and that it was therefore unconstitutional to use their statements in a prosecution; the officers' convictions were overturned. The case, Garrity v. New Jersey, led to the creation of the Garrity warning, which advises government employees of their rights during internal investigations.

In late October 2001, the Bellmawr post office was closed due to possible anthrax contamination in the wake of the 2001 anthrax attacks. The office was re-opened several days later, in early November, after testing negative for anthrax.

In 2017, Bellmawr joined Cranbury, Egg Harbor Township, Montclair and Woodbridge Township as one of the first five municipalities in the state that have authorized dispensaries to sell medical cannabis.

== Geography ==
According to the United States Census Bureau, the borough had a total area of 3.11 square miles (8.05 km^{2}), including 2.98 square miles (7.73 km^{2}) of land and 0.12 square miles (0.32 km^{2}) of water (3.92%).

The borough borders the municipalities of Barrington, Brooklawn, Gloucester City, Haddon Heights, Mount Ephraim, and Runnemede in Camden County; and Deptford and Westville, both in Gloucester County.

== Demographics ==
Historical population
Census	Pop.	Note	%±
1930	1,123		—
1940	1,250		11.3%
1950	5,213		317.0%
1960	11,853		127.4%
1970	15,618		31.8%
1980	13,721		−12.1%
1990	12,603		−8.1%
2000	11,262		−10.6%
2010	11,583		2.9%
2020	11,707		1.1%
2024 (est.)	11,846	▲	1.2%
Population sources:1930–2000 1930 1940–2000; 2000 2010 2020

=== 2020 census ===
As of the 2020 census, Bellmawr had a population of 11,707. The median age was 41.9 years. 19.4% of residents were under the age of 18 and 18.4% of residents were 65 years of age or older. For every 100 females there were 95.8 males, and for every 100 females age 18 and over there were 95.2 males age 18 and over.

100.0% of residents lived in urban areas, while 0.0% lived in rural areas.

There were 4,779 households in Bellmawr, of which 27.1% had children under the age of 18 living in them. Of all households, 43.2% were married-couple households, 20.6% were households with a male householder and no spouse or partner present, and 27.6% were households with a female householder and no spouse or partner present. About 29.1% of all households were made up of individuals and 12.7% had someone living alone who was 65 years of age or older.

There were 4,962 housing units, of which 3.7% were vacant. The homeowner vacancy rate was 1.9% and the rental vacancy rate was 3.1%.

Racial composition as of the 2020 census
Race	Number	Percent
White	8,811	75.3%
Black or African American	533	4.6%
American Indian and Alaska Native	43	0.4%
Asian	898	7.7%
Native Hawaiian and Other Pacific Islander	0	0.0%
Some other race	614	5.2%
Two or more races	808	6.9%
Hispanic or Latino (of any race)	1,223	10.4%

=== 2010 census ===
The 2010 United States census counted 11,583 people, 4,670 households, and 3,068 families in the borough. The population density was 3,887.7 per square mile (1,501.0/km^{2}). There were 4,883 housing units at an average density of 1,638.9 per square mile (632.8/km^{2}). The racial makeup was 86.44% (10,012) White, 2.46% (285) Black or African American, 0.15% (17) Native American, 5.86% (679) Asian, 0.06% (7) Pacific Islander, 3.38% (392) from other races, and 1.65% (191) from two or more races. Hispanic or Latino of any race were 7.68% (890) of the population.

Of the 4,670 households, 26.3% had children under the age of 18; 47.5% were married couples living together; 12.9% had a female householder with no husband present and 34.3% were non-families. Of all households, 29.4% were made up of individuals and 12.8% had someone living alone who was 65 years of age or older. The average household size was 2.48 and the average family size was 3.06.

20.3% of the population were under the age of 18, 8.2% from 18 to 24, 26.5% from 25 to 44, 27.9% from 45 to 64, and 17.0% who were 65 years of age or older. The median age was 41.3 years. For every 100 females, the population had 95.9 males. For every 100 females ages 18 and older there were 93.8 males.

The Census Bureau's 2006–2010 American Community Survey showed that (in 2010 inflation-adjusted dollars) median household income was $56,182 (with a margin of error of ± $3,809) and the median family income was $66,947 (± $3,353). Males had a median income of $47,251 (± $3,082) versus $39,932 (± $4,677) for females. The per capita income for the borough was $25,961 (± $1,460). About 7.3% of families and 9.9% of the population were below the poverty line, including 19.9% of those under age 18 and 4.0% of those age 65 or over.

=== 2000 census ===
As of the 2000 United States census there were 11,262 people, 4,446 households, and 3,134 families residing in the borough. The population density was 3,715.5 inhabitants per square mile (1,434.6/km^{2}). There were 4,561 housing units at an average density of 1,504.7 per square mile (581.0/km^{2}). The racial makeup of the borough was 92.79% White, 1.18% African American, 0.06% Native American, 3.05% Asian, 0.02% Pacific Islander, 1.54% from other races, and 1.36% from two or more races. Hispanic or Latino of any race were 3.50% of the population.

There were 4,446 households, out of which 26.9% had children under the age of 18 living with them, 52.3% were married couples living together, 12.6% had a female householder with no husband present, and 29.5% were non-families. 25.3% of all households were made up of individuals, and 11.1% had someone living alone who was 65 years of age or older. The average household size was 2.53 and the average family size was 3.02.

In the borough the population was spread out, with 20.8% under the age of 18, 8.4% from 18 to 24, 28.8% from 25 to 44, 24.6% from 45 to 64, and 17.5% who were 65 years of age or older. The median age was 40 years. For every 100 females, there were 96.5 males. For every 100 females age 18 and over, there were 94.9 males.

The median income for a household in the borough was $44,653, and the median income for a family was $53,839. Males had a median income of $38,646 versus $27,050 for females. The per capita income for the borough was $19,863. About 2.6% of families and 4.0% of the population were below the poverty line, including 3.7% of those under age 18 and 5.2% of those age 65 or over.

== Government ==
=== Local government ===
Bellmawr is governed under the borough form of New Jersey municipal government, which is used in 218 municipalities (of the 564) statewide, making it the most common form of government in New Jersey. The governing body is comprised of a mayor and a six-member borough council, with all positions elected at-large on a partisan basis as part of the November general election. A mayor is elected directly by the voters to a four-year term of office. The borough council includes six members elected to serve three-year terms on a staggered basis, with two seats coming up for election each year in a three-year cycle. The borough form of government used by Bellmawr is a "weak mayor / strong council" government in which council members act as the legislative body with the mayor presiding at meetings and voting only in the event of a tie. The mayor can veto ordinances subject to an override by a two-thirds majority vote of the council. The mayor makes committee and liaison assignments for council members, and most appointments are made by the mayor with the advice and consent of the council.

As of 2024, the mayor of the Borough of Bellmawr is Democrat Charles J. "Chuck" Sauter III, whose term of office ends December 31, 2026. The members of the Bellmawr Borough Council are Raymond Bider (D, 2025), James F. D'Angelo (D, 2026), Bill Evans (D, 2027), Johann Fina (D, 2026), Eric Hoban (D, 2028) and Craig R. Wilhelm (D, 2027).

In December 2021, the borough council selected Bill Evans to fill the seat expiring in December 2024 that had been held by Steven Hagerty until he resigned from office. In November 2022, Evans was elected to serve the balance of the term of office.

In January 2016, Ray Bider was appointed to fill the seat expiring in December 2016 that became vacant following the resignation the previous month of Joshua Tregear, who was appointed to serve as Borough Administrator.

In October 2015, David Spector was appointed to fill the seat expiring in December 2016 that had been held by David M. Duncan until his death the previous month.

In November 2012, the council selected Joshua Tregear, from among a list of three candidates recommended by the Camden County Democratic Committee, to fill the vacant seat of Regina Piontkowski, who had resigned two months earlier after serving nearly 20 years in office.

=== Federal, state and county representation ===
Bellmawr is located in the 1st Congressional District and is part of New Jersey's 5th state legislative district.

For the 119th United States Congress, New Jersey's 1st congressional district is represented by Donald Norcross (D, Camden). New Jersey is represented in the United States Senate by Democrats Cory Booker (Newark, term ends 2027) and Andy Kim (Moorestown, term ends 2031).

For the 2026–2027 session, the 5th legislative district of the New Jersey Legislature is represented in the State Senate by Nilsa Cruz-Perez (D, Barrington) and in the General Assembly by Bill Moen (D, Camden) and William Spearman (D, Camden).

Camden County is governed by a Board of County Commissioners composed of seven members chosen at-large in partisan elections for three-year terms on a staggered basis by the residents of the county, with either two or three seats up for election each year as part of the November general election. At a reorganization meeting held in January after each election, the newly constituted Board of Commissioners selects one member to serve as Director and another as Deputy Director, each serving a one-year term in that role. As of 2025, Camden County's Commissioners are: Commissioner Director Louis Cappelli Jr. (D, Collingswood, 2026), Commissioner Deputy Director Edward T. McDonnell (D, Pennsauken Township, 2025), Virginia Ruiz Betteridge (D, Runnemede, 2025), Almar Dyer (D, Pennsauken Township, 2027), Melinda Kane (D, Cherry Hill, 2027), Jeffrey L. Nash (D, Winslow Township, 2027), and Jonathan L. Young Sr. (D, Berlin Township, 2026).

Camden County's constitutional officers are: Clerk Pamela Rosen Lampitt (D, Cherry Hill, 2029) Sheriff Chuck Billingham (D, Gloucester City, 2027) and Surrogate Michelle Gentek-Mayer (D, Gloucester Township, 2025).

=== Politics ===
As of March 2011, there were a total of 7,368 registered voters in Bellmawr, of which 3,416 (46.4% vs. 31.7% countywide) were registered as Democrats, 839 (11.4% vs. 21.1%) were registered as Republicans and 3,110 (42.2% vs. 47.1%) were registered as Unaffiliated. There were 3 voters registered as Libertarians or Greens. Among the borough's 2010 Census population, 63.6% (vs. 57.1% in Camden County) were registered to vote, including 79.9% of those ages 18 and over (vs. 73.7% countywide).

Gubernatorial election results for Bellmawr
Year	Republican		Democratic		Third party(ies)	
Year	No.	%	No.	%	No.	%
2025	1,743	41.32%	2,433	57.68%	42	1.00%
2021	1,587	49.50%	1,590	49.59%	29	0.90%
2017	957	37.49%	1,498	58.68%	98	3.84%
2013	1,678	63.04%	939	35.27%	45	1.69%
2009	1,348	44.98%	1,422	47.45%	227	7.57%
2005	1,017	33.48%	1,865	61.39%	156	5.13%

In the 2012 presidential election, Democrat Barack Obama received 3,064 votes (61.5% vs. 54.8% countywide), ahead of Republican Mitt Romney with 1,788 votes (35.9% vs. 43.5%) and other candidates with 63 votes (1.3% vs. 0.9%), among the 4,983 ballots cast by the borough's 7,875 registered voters, for a turnout of 63.3% (vs. 70.4% in Camden County). In the 2008 presidential election, Democrat Barack Obama received 3,124 votes (59.2% vs. 66.2% countywide), ahead of Republican John McCain with 1,985 votes (37.6% vs. 30.7%) and other candidates with 62 votes (1.2% vs. 1.1%), among the 5,275 ballots cast by the borough's 7,654 registered voters, for a turnout of 68.9% (vs. 71.4% in Camden County). In the 2004 presidential election, Democrat John Kerry received 3,277 votes (60.8% vs. 61.7% countywide), ahead of Republican George W. Bush with 2,034 votes (37.7% vs. 36.4%) and other candidates with 36 votes (0.7% vs. 0.8%), among the 5,389 ballots cast by the borough's 7,307 registered voters, for a turnout of 73.8% (vs. 71.3% in the whole county).

United States presidential election results for Bellmawr
Year	Republican		Democratic		Third party(ies)	
Year	No.	%	No.	%	No.	%
2024	2,796	49.21%	2,802	49.31%	84	1.48%
2020	2,851	46.43%	3,187	51.91%	102	1.66%
2016	2,337	46.27%	2,555	50.58%	159	3.15%
2012	1,788	36.38%	3,064	62.34%	63	1.28%
2008	1,985	38.39%	3,124	60.41%	62	1.20%
2004	2,034	38.05%	3,277	61.31%	34	0.64%

In the 2013 gubernatorial election, Republican Chris Christie received 63.0% of the vote (1,678 cast), ahead of Democrat Barbara Buono with 35.3% (939 votes), and other candidates with 1.7% (45 votes), among the 2,759 ballots cast by the borough's 7,921 registered voters (97 ballots were spoiled), for a turnout of 34.8%. In the 2009 gubernatorial election, Democrat Jon Corzine received 1,422 ballots cast (46.4% vs. 53.8% countywide), ahead of Republican Chris Christie with 1,348 votes (44.0% vs. 38.5%), Independent Chris Daggett with 170 votes (5.5% vs. 4.5%) and other candidates with 57 votes (1.9% vs. 1.1%), among the 3,066 ballots cast by the borough's 7,349 registered voters, yielding a 41.7% turnout (vs. 40.8% in the county).

United States Senate election results for Bellmawr1
Year	Republican		Democratic		Third party(ies)	
Year	No.	%	No.	%	No.	%
2024	2,398	44.31%	2,935	54.23%	79	1.46%
2018	1,864	43.47%	1,930	45.01%	494	11.52%
2012	1,607	34.34%	3,006	64.23%	67	1.43%
2006	1,159	36.08%	1,977	61.55%	76	2.37%

United States Senate election results for Bellmawr2
Year	Republican		Democratic		Third party(ies)	
Year	No.	%	No.	%	No.	%
2020	2,624	44.06%	3,243	54.46%	88	1.48%
2014	1,051	35.32%	1,825	61.32%	100	3.36%
2013	670	43.62%	831	54.10%	35	2.28%
2008	1,608	34.09%	3,037	64.38%	72	1.53%

== Education ==
The Bellmawr School District serves public school students from pre-kindergarten through eighth grade. As of the 2023–24 school year, the district, comprised of three schools, had an enrollment of 1,183 students and 104.0 classroom teachers (on an FTE basis), for a student–teacher ratio of 11.4:1. Schools in the district (with 2023–24 enrollment data from the National Center for Education Statistics) are Bellmawr Park Elementary School with 483 students in grades PreK–4, Ethel M. Burke Elementary School with 233 students in grades K–4 and Bell Oaks Upper Elementary School with 454 students in grades 5–8.

For ninth through twelfth grades, public-school students attend Triton Regional High School in neighboring Runnemede, one of three high schools that are part of the Black Horse Pike Regional School District. The other communities in the district are Gloucester Township and Runnemede. As of the 2023–24 school year, the high school had an enrollment of 1,114 students and 100.0 classroom teachers (on an FTE basis), for a student–teacher ratio of 11.1:1. The two other schools in the district are Highland Regional High School and Timber Creek Regional High School, which serve students from Gloucester Township, based on their address. The district is governed by a nine-member board of education that oversees the operation of the district; seats on the board are allocated to the constituent municipalities based on population, with one seat allocated to Bellmawr.

Students from Bellmawr, and from all of Camden County, are eligible to attend the Camden County Technical Schools, a countywide public school district that serves the vocational and technical education needs of students at the high school and post-secondary level at Gloucester Township Technical High School in the Sicklerville section of Gloucester Township or Pennsauken Technical High School in Pennsauken. Students are accepted based on district admission standards and costs of attendance and transportation are covered by the home district of each student.

Our Lady of the Sacred Heart Regional School in Barrington was formed in September 2008 through a merger of Bellmawr's Annunciation Regional School and Barrington's St. Francis de Sales Regional School. With an enrollment of about 150 students, the Roman Catholic Diocese of Camden announced in June 2009 that the newly combined school would be closed.

== Transportation ==
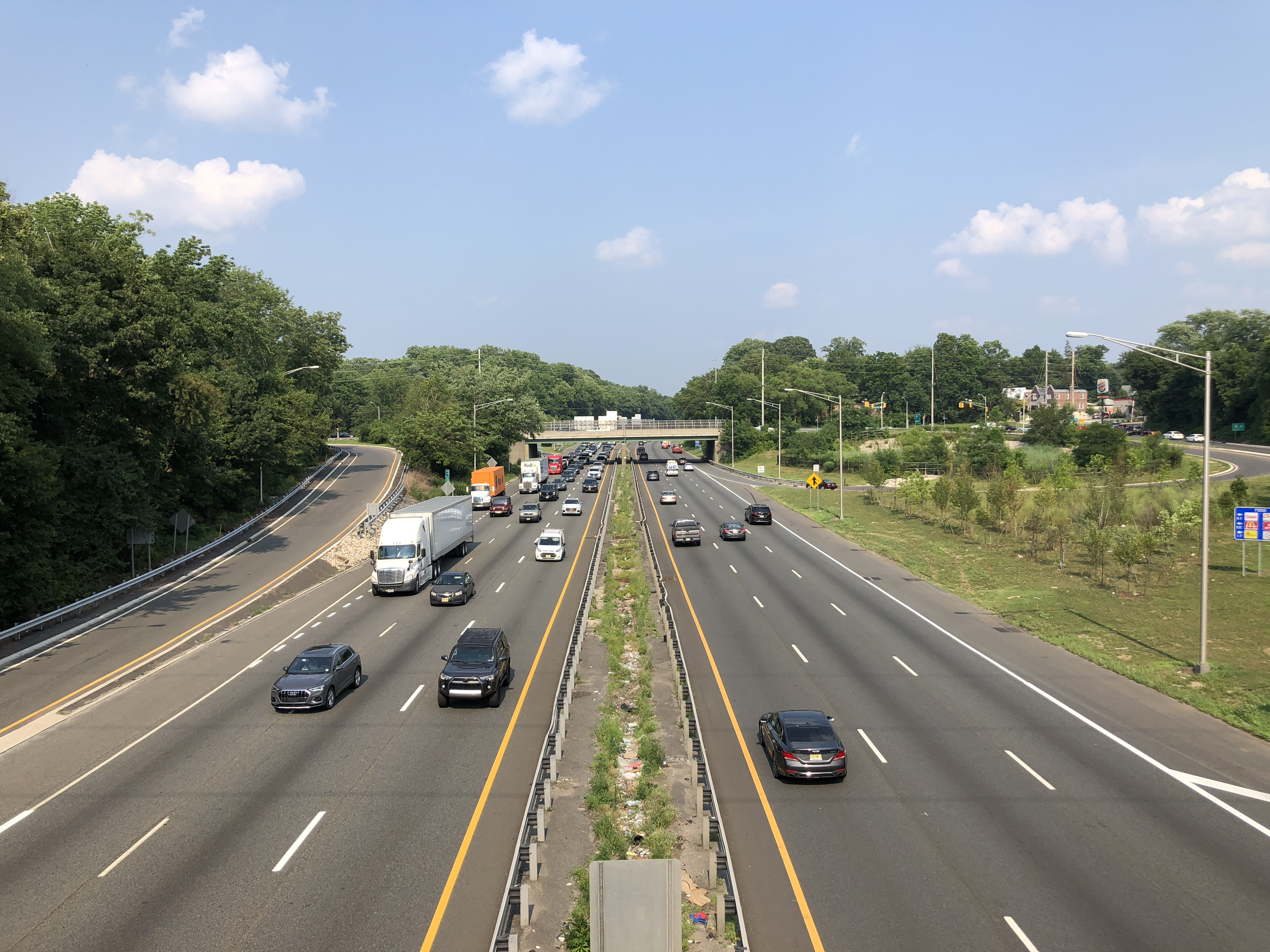
Interstate 295 northbound in Bellmawr

=== Roads and highways ===
As of May 2010, the borough had a total of 45.98 miles (74.00 km) of roadways, of which 34.87 miles (56.12 km) were maintained by the municipality, 5.62 miles (9.04 km) by Camden County, 4.57 miles (7.35 km) by the New Jersey Department of Transportation and 0.92 miles (1.48 km) by the New Jersey Turnpike Authority.

The New Jersey Turnpike is the most prominent highway passing through Bellmawr. It crosses the southern part of the borough, and part of Interchange 3 is located within Bellmawr. Both the interchange and the toll gate (which features six lanes at the gate) runs along the border with Runnemede. Bellmawr also hosts the interchange between the "North-South Freeway" (Route 42 / I-76) and I-295. Additional significant roads that pass through Bellmawr include Route 168 and a very small portion of US 130. The only major county road that passes through Bellmawr is CR 551 Spur in the western part of the borough.

=== Public transportation ===
NJ Transit bus service is available in the borough on the 400 route between Sicklerville and Philadelphia.

== Notable people ==
People who were born in, residents of, or otherwise closely associated with Bellmawr include:

- Rob Andrews (born 1957), congressman who served for 24 years as the U.S. representative for New Jersey's 1st congressional district
- Mary Jane Barker (1953–1957), 4-year-old girl who went missing along with her playmate's dog. Despite the initial suspicion of foul play, the death was ruled an accident; a case of starvation and exposure as Barker was unable to escape the closet.
- Walter Rand (1919–1995), politician who served in both the New Jersey General Assembly and New Jersey Senate who focused on transportation issues
- Joseph J. Roberts (born 1952), politician who served in the New Jersey General Assembly from 1987 to 2010, and was Speaker of the Assembly from 2006 to 2010
- Buddy Robinson (born 1991), professional ice hockey player who played in the NHL for the Calgary Flames
- Eric Robinson (born 1995), ice hockey winger for the Buffalo Sabres of the National Hockey League
- Jim Ryan (born 1957), former linebackers coach who played linebacker in the NFL for the Denver Broncos
