= Barrington, New Jersey =

Borough in Camden County, New Jersey, US

- Borough
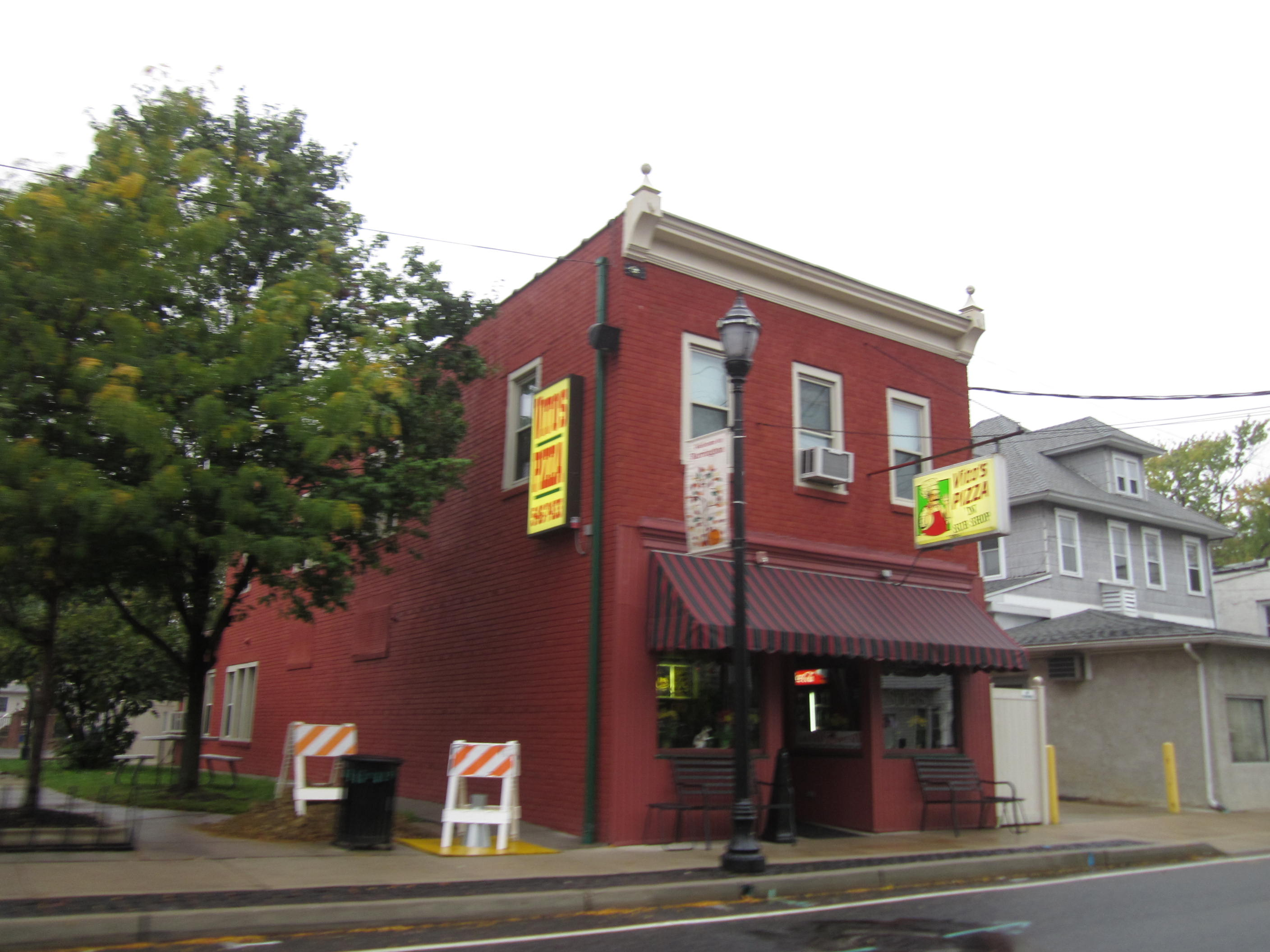
- Clements Bridge Road

- Seal

- Location of Barrington in Camden County highlighted in red (right). Inset map: Location of Camden County in New Jersey highlighted in orange (left).

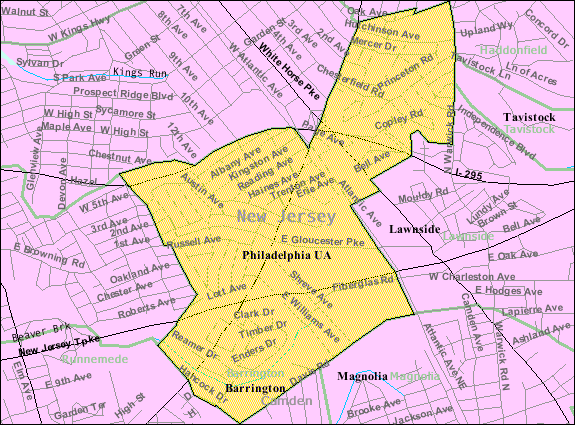
- Census Bureau map of Barrington, New Jersey

- Location in Camden County Location in New Jersey Location in the United States
- Coordinates: 39.868935°N 75.051362°W
- Country: United States
- State: New Jersey
- County: Camden
- Incorporated: April 17, 1917
- Named after: Great Barrington, Massachusetts

Government
  - Type: Borough
  - Body: Borough Council
  - Mayor: Kyle Hanson (D, term ends December 31, 2027)
  - Municipal clerk: Terry Shannon

Area
  - Total: 1.58 sq mi (4.10 km^{2})
  - Land: 1.58 sq mi (4.10 km^{2})
  - Water: 0 sq mi (0.00 km^{2}) 0.00%
  - Rank: 443rd of 565 in state 21st of 37 in county
- Elevation: 79 ft (24 m)

Population (2020)
  - Total: 7,075
  - Estimate (2023): 7,069
  - Rank: 316th of 565 in state 19th of 37 in county
  - Density: 4,475/sq mi (1,728/km^{2})
  - Rank: 135th of 565 in state 14th of 37 in county
- Time zone: UTC−05:00 (Eastern (EST))
  - Summer (DST): UTC−04:00 (Eastern (EDT))
- ZIP Code: 08007
- Area code: 856
- FIPS code: 3400703250
- GNIS feature ID: 0885149
- Website: www.barringtonboro.com

Barrington is a borough in Camden County, in the U.S. state of New Jersey. As of the 2020 United States census, the borough's population was 7,075, an increase of 92 (+1.3%) from the 2010 census count of 6,983, which in turn reflected a decline of 101 (-1.4%) from the 7,084 counted in the 2000 census.

The area became known as "Barrington" in the 1880s, when William Simpson, one of the partners that developed the area, chose the name from his home in Great Barrington, Massachusetts.

Barrington was incorporated as a borough on March 27, 1917, from portions of the now-defunct Centre Township, based on the results of a referendum held on April 17, 1917. Portions of the borough were taken on March 24, 1926, to form Lawnside.

The borough had the 30th-highest property tax rate in New Jersey, with an equalized rate of 4.069% in 2020, compared to 3.470% in the county as a whole and a statewide average of 2.279%.

== Geography ==
According to the United States Census Bureau, The borough had a total area of 1.58 square miles (4.10 km^{2}), all of which was land.

The borough borders the Camden County municipalities of Bellmawr, Haddon Heights, Haddonfield, Lawnside, Magnolia, Runnemede and Tavistock.

== Demographics ==
Historical population
Census	Pop.	Note	%±
1920	1,333		—
1930	2,252	*	68.9%
1940	2,329		3.4%
1950	2,651		13.8%
1960	7,943		199.6%
1970	8,409		5.9%
1980	7,418		−11.8%
1990	6,774		−8.7%
2000	7,050		4.1%
2010	6,983		−1.0%
2020	7,075		1.3%
2023 (est.)	7,069	▼	−0.1%
Population sources: 1920–2000; 1920 1920–1930 1940–2000; 2000 2010 2020 * = Lost territory in previous decade.

=== 2020 census ===
As of the 2020 census, Barrington had a population of 7,075. The median age was 40.5 years. 19.2% of residents were under the age of 18 and 18.9% of residents were 65 years of age or older. For every 100 females there were 93.1 males, and for every 100 females age 18 and older there were 88.7 males age 18 and older.

100.0% of residents lived in urban areas, while 0.0% lived in rural areas.

There were 3,197 households in Barrington, of which 23.4% had children under the age of 18 living in them. Of all households, 38.4% were married-couple households, 21.1% were households with a male householder and no spouse or partner present, and 33.2% were households with a female householder and no spouse or partner present. About 38.1% of all households were made up of individuals and 15.9% had someone living alone who was 65 years of age or older.

There were 3,415 housing units, of which 6.4% were vacant. The homeowner vacancy rate was 2.0% and the rental vacancy rate was 6.9%.

Racial composition as of the 2020 census
Race	Number	Percent
White	5,797	81.9%
Black or African American	468	6.6%
American Indian and Alaska Native	20	0.3%
Asian	164	2.3%
Native Hawaiian and Other Pacific Islander	1	0.0%
Some other race	202	2.9%
Two or more races	423	6.0%
Hispanic or Latino (of any race)	461	6.5%

=== 2010 census ===
The 2010 United States census counted 6,983 people, 2,988 households, and 1,805 families in the borough. The population density was 4,346.0 per square mile (1,678.0/km^{2}). There were 3,158 housing units at an average density of 1,965.4 per square mile (758.8/km^{2}). The racial makeup was 89.56% (6,254) White, 5.13% (358) Black or African American, 0.23% (16) Native American, 1.69% (118) Asian, 0.00% (0) Pacific Islander, 1.46% (102) from other races, and 1.93% (135) from two or more races. Hispanic or Latino of any race were 5.44% (380) of the population.

Of the 2,988 households, 25.8% had children under the age of 18; 44.2% were married couples living together; 11.6% had a female householder with no husband present and 39.6% were non-families. Of all households, 33.3% were made up of individuals and 13.4% had someone living alone who was 65 years of age or older. The average household size was 2.34 and the average family size was 3.01.

20.8% of the population were under the age of 18, 7.6% from 18 to 24, 27.8% from 25 to 44, 28.0% from 45 to 64, and 15.8% who were 65 years of age or older. The median age was 40.7 years. For every 100 females, the population had 94.1 males. For every 100 females ages 18 and older there were 89.7 males.

The Census Bureau's 2006–2010 American Community Survey showed that (in 2010 inflation-adjusted dollars) median household income was $56,681 (with a margin of error of +/− $6,097) and the median family income was $81,398 (+/− $9,410). Males had a median income of $48,028 (+/− $7,016) versus $41,534 (+/− $5,225) for females. The per capita income for the borough was $29,987 (+/− $2,091). About 2.0% of families and 3.3% of the population were below the poverty line, including 5.3% of those under age 18 and 7.1% of those age 65 or over.

=== 2000 census ===
As of the 2000 United States census there were 7,084 people, 3,028 households, and 1,831 families residing in the borough. The population density was 4,411.4 inhabitants per square mile (1,703.3/km^{2}). There were 3,164 housing units at an average density of 1,970.3 per square mile (760.7/km^{2}). The racial makeup of the borough was 91.61% White, 4.16% African American, 0.24% Native American, 1.44% Asian, 0.04% Pacific Islander, 1.07% from other races, and 1.43% from two or more races. Hispanic or Latino of any race were 2.84% of the population.

There were 3,028 households, out of which 25.9% had children under the age of 18 living with them, 46.9% were married couples living together, 10.4% had a female householder with no husband present, and 39.5% were non-families. 33.6% of all households were made up of individuals, and 15.2% had someone living alone who was 65 years of age or older. The average household size was 2.34 and the average family size was 3.04.

In the borough the population was spread out, with 21.1% under the age of 18, 7.6% from 18 to 24, 32.2% from 25 to 44, 21.4% from 45 to 64, and 17.6% who were 65 years of age or older. The median age was 38 years. For every 100 females, there were 91.0 males. For every 100 females age 18 and over, there were 87.0 males.

The median income for a household in the borough was $45,148, and the median income for a family was $59,706. Males had a median income of $41,211 versus $31,927 for females. The per capita income for the borough was $24,434. About 0.4% of families and 1.9% of the population were below the poverty line, including 0.8% of those under age 18 and 2.2% of those age 65 or over.

== Economy ==
Edmund Scientific Corporation had been based in the borough since 1942. The company store opened in 1952 and closed in 2001 when the consumer business was sold off and relocated to Tonawanda, New York.

Barrington is also home to an International Paper box manufacturing facility.

== Government ==
=== Local government ===
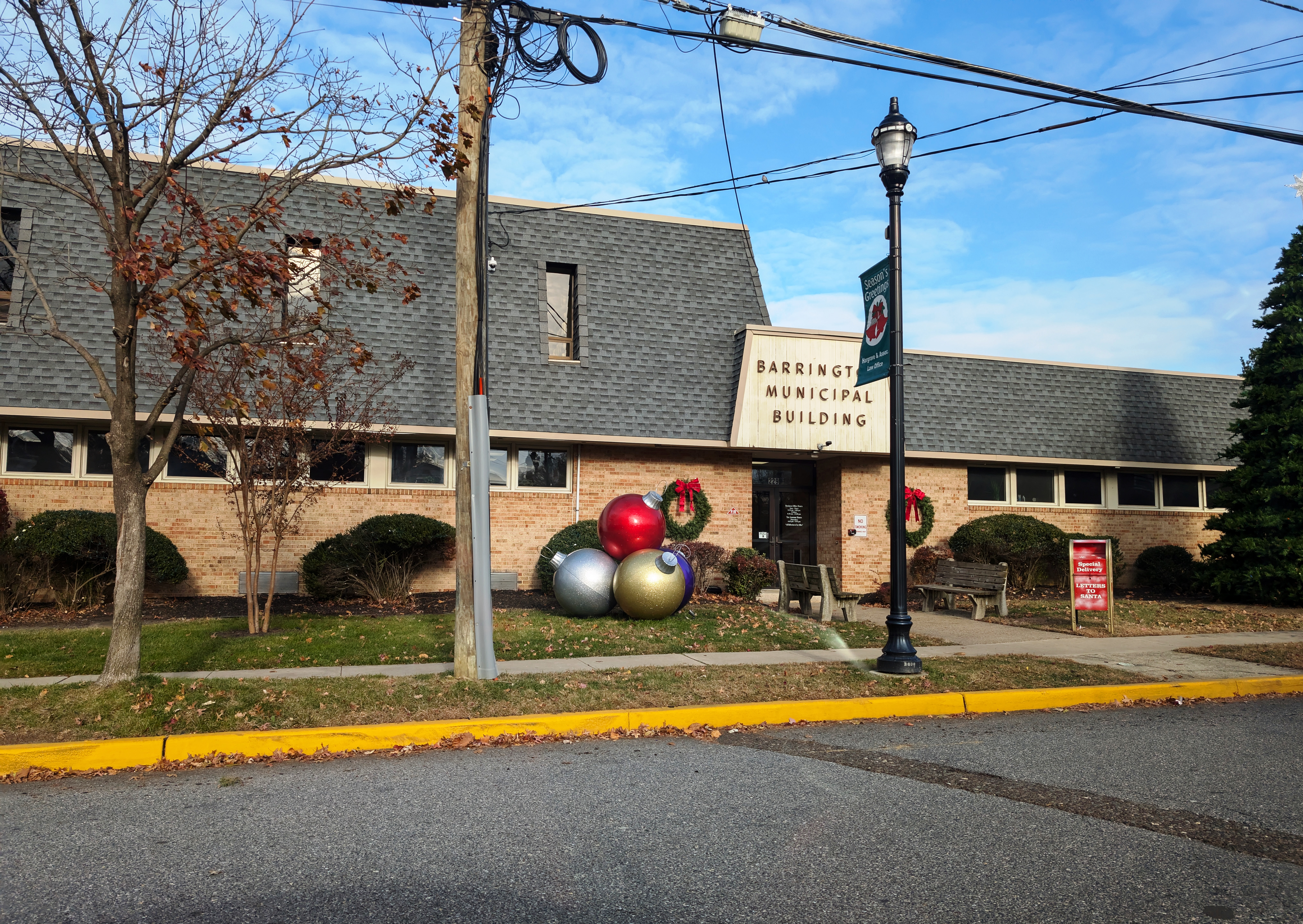
Barrington Municipal Building

Barrington is governed under the borough form of New Jersey municipal government, which is used in 218 municipalities (of the 564) statewide, making it the most common form of government in New Jersey. The governing body is comprised of a mayor and a borough council, with all positions elected at-large on a partisan basis as part of the November general election. A mayor is elected directly by the voters to a four-year term of office. The borough council includes six members elected to serve three-year terms on a staggered basis, with two seats coming up for election each year in a three-year cycle. The borough form of government used by Barrington is a "weak mayor / strong council" government in which council members act as the legislative body with the mayor presiding at meetings and voting only in the event of a tie. The mayor can veto ordinances subject to an override by a two-thirds majority vote of the council. The mayor makes committee and liaison assignments for council members, and most appointments are made by the mayor with the advice and consent of the council.

As of 2026, the mayor of the Borough of Barrington is Democrat Kyle Hanson, whose term of office ends December 31, 2027. Members of the Borough Council are Council President Michael L. Beach (D, 2028), Vincent Cerrito (D, 2026), Michael Drumm (D, 2024), Shawn Ludwig (D, 2024), Melanie Mercado-Miller (D, 2026) and Alisha VanBernum (D, 2028).

Wayne Robenolt was elected to fill the vacant seat of Harry Vincent, who died in January 2012.

=== Federal, state and county representation ===
Barrington is located in the 1st Congressional district and is part of New Jersey's 5th state legislative district.

For the 119th United States Congress, New Jersey's 1st congressional district is represented by Donald Norcross (D, Camden). New Jersey is represented in the United States Senate by Democrats Cory Booker (Newark, term ends 2027) and Andy Kim (Moorestown, term ends 2031).

For the 2026–2027 session, the 5th legislative district of the New Jersey Legislature is represented in the State Senate by Nilsa Cruz-Perez (D, Barrington) and in the General Assembly by Bill Moen (D, Camden) and William Spearman (D, Camden).

Camden County is governed by a Board of County Commissioners composed of seven members chosen at-large in partisan elections for three-year terms on a staggered basis by the residents of the county, with either two or three seats up for election each year as part of the November general election. At a reorganization meeting held in January after each election, the newly constituted Board of Commissioners selects one member to serve as Director and another as Deputy Director, each serving a one-year term in that role. As of 2025, Camden County's Commissioners are: Commissioner Director Louis Cappelli Jr. (D, Collingswood, 2026), Commissioner Deputy Director Edward T. McDonnell (D, Pennsauken Township, 2025), Virginia Ruiz Betteridge (D, Runnemede, 2025), Almar Dyer (D, Pennsauken Township, 2027), Melinda Kane (D, Cherry Hill, 2027), Jeffrey L. Nash (D, Winslow Township, 2027), and Jonathan L. Young Sr. (D, Berlin Township, 2026).

Camden County's constitutional officers are: Clerk Pamela Rosen Lampitt (D, Cherry Hill, 2029) Sheriff Chuck Billingham (D, Gloucester City, 2027) and Surrogate Michelle Gentek-Mayer (D, Gloucester Township, 2025).

=== Politics ===
As of March 2011, there were a total of 4,823 registered voters in Barrington, of which 1,826 (37.9% vs. 31.7% countywide) were registered as Democrats, 860 (17.8% vs. 21.1%) were registered as Republicans and 2,132 (44.2% vs. 47.1%) were registered as Unaffiliated. There were 5 voters registered as Libertarians or Greens. Among the borough's 2010 Census population, 69.1% (vs. 57.1% in Camden County) were registered to vote, including 87.2% of those ages 18 and over (vs. 73.7% countywide).

Gubernatorial election results for Barrington
Year	Republican		Democratic		Third party(ies)	
Year	No.	%	No.	%	No.	%
2025	1,133	37.23%	1,887	62.01%	23	0.76%
2021	1,074	43.82%	1,356	55.32%	21	0.86%
2017	957	37.83%	1,498	59.21%	75	2.96%
2013	1,147	62.17%	653	35.39%	45	2.44%
2009	998	47.71%	929	44.41%	165	7.89%
2005	902	42.33%	1,109	52.04%	120	5.63%

In the 2012 presidential election, Democrat Barack Obama received 2,015 votes (59.3% vs. 54.8% countywide), ahead of Republican Mitt Romney with 1,310 votes (38.6% vs. 43.5%) and other candidates with 42 votes (1.2% vs. 0.9%), among the 3,398 ballots cast by the borough's 5,155 registered voters, for a turnout of 65.9% (vs. 70.4% in Camden County). In the 2008 presidential election, Democrat Barack Obama received 2,079 votes (57.8% vs. 66.2% countywide), ahead of Republican John McCain with 1,396 votes (38.8% vs. 30.7%) and other candidates with 60 votes (1.7% vs. 1.1%), among the 3,599 ballots cast by the borough's 4,936 registered voters, for a turnout of 72.9% (vs. 71.4% in Camden County). In the 2004 presidential election, Democrat John Kerry received 2,036 votes (56.8% vs. 61.7% countywide), ahead of Republican George W. Bush with 1,503 votes (42.0% vs. 36.4%) and other candidates with 27 votes (0.8% vs. 0.8%), among the 3,582 ballots cast by the borough's 4,679 registered voters, for a turnout of 76.6% (vs. 71.3% in the whole county).

United States presidential election results for Barrington
Year	Republican		Democratic		Third party(ies)	
Year	No.	%	No.	%	No.	%
2024	1,556	40.64%	2,220	57.98%	53	1.38%
2020	1,522	37.91%	2,419	60.25%	74	1.84%
2016	1,342	40.01%	1,842	54.92%	170	5.07%
2012	1,310	38.91%	2,015	59.85%	42	1.25%
2008	1,396	39.49%	2,079	58.81%	60	1.70%
2004	1,503	42.15%	2,036	57.09%	27	0.76%

In the 2013 gubernatorial election, Republican Chris Christie received 62.2% of the vote (1,147 cast), ahead of Democrat Barbara Buono with 35.4% (653 votes), and other candidates with 2.4% (45 votes), among the 1,904 ballots cast by the borough's 5,094 registered voters (59 ballots were spoiled), for a turnout of 37.4%. In the 2009 gubernatorial election, Republican Chris Christie received 998 votes (47.1% vs. 38.5% countywide), ahead of Democrat Jon Corzine with 929 votes (43.8% vs. 53.8%), Independent Chris Daggett with 130 votes (6.1% vs. 4.5%) and other candidates with 35 votes (1.7% vs. 1.1%), among the 2,119 ballots cast by the borough's 4,703 registered voters, yielding a 45.1% turnout (vs. 40.8% in the county).

United States Senate election results for Barrington1
Year	Republican		Democratic		Third party(ies)	
Year	No.	%	No.	%	No.	%
2024	1,435	38.04%	2,286	60.60%	51	1.35%
2018	1,155	42.75%	1,374	50.85%	173	6.40%
2012	1,228	37.80%	1,972	60.70%	49	1.51%
2006	956	45.03%	1,100	51.81%	67	3.16%

United States Senate election results for Barrington2
Year	Republican		Democratic		Third party(ies)	
Year	No.	%	No.	%	No.	%
2020	1,539	38.89%	2,370	59.89%	48	1.21%
2014	727	42.44%	957	55.87%	29	1.69%
2013	486	46.37%	542	51.72%	20	1.91%
2008	1,386	42.26%	1,846	56.28%	48	1.46%

== Education ==
The Barrington Public Schools serve public school students in kindergarten through eighth grade. As of the 2020–21 school year, the district, comprised of two schools, had an enrollment of 567 students and 60.8 classroom teachers (on an FTE basis), for a student–teacher ratio of 9.3:1. Schools in the district (with 2020–21 enrollment data from the National Center for Education Statistics) are Avon Elementary School with 312 students in grades PreK-4 Woodland Middle School with 251 students in grades 5 through 8.

For ninth through twelfth grades, public school students attend Haddon Heights Junior/Senior High School, which serves Haddon Heights, and students from Barrington, Lawnside and Merchantville who attend the high school as part of sending/receiving relationships with the Haddon Heights School District. The Haddon Heights district approved a contract in September 2013 with the Merchantville School District that would add about 80 students a year from Merchantville to the high school, in addition to the average of more than 260 students from Barrington and 120 from Lawnside that are sent to Haddon Heights each year. As of the 2020–21 school year, the high school had an enrollment of 997 students and 82.0 classroom teachers (on an FTE basis), for a student–teacher ratio of 12.2:1.

Students from Barrington, and from all of Camden County, are eligible to attend the Camden County Technical Schools, a countywide public school district that serves the vocational and technical education needs of students at the high school and post-secondary level at Gloucester Township Technical High School in the Sicklerville section of Gloucester Township or Pennsauken Technical High School in Pennsauken Township. Students are accepted based on district admission standards and costs of attendance and transportation are covered by the home district of each student.

St. Francis De Sales Regional School was an elementary school that operated under the auspices of the Roman Catholic Diocese of Camden. The school closed after the 2008–2009 school year in the face of declining enrollment and rising costs. Annunciation School in Bellmawr had been closed by the diocese at the end of the 2007–2008 school year and merged into the Barrington school.

== Transportation ==
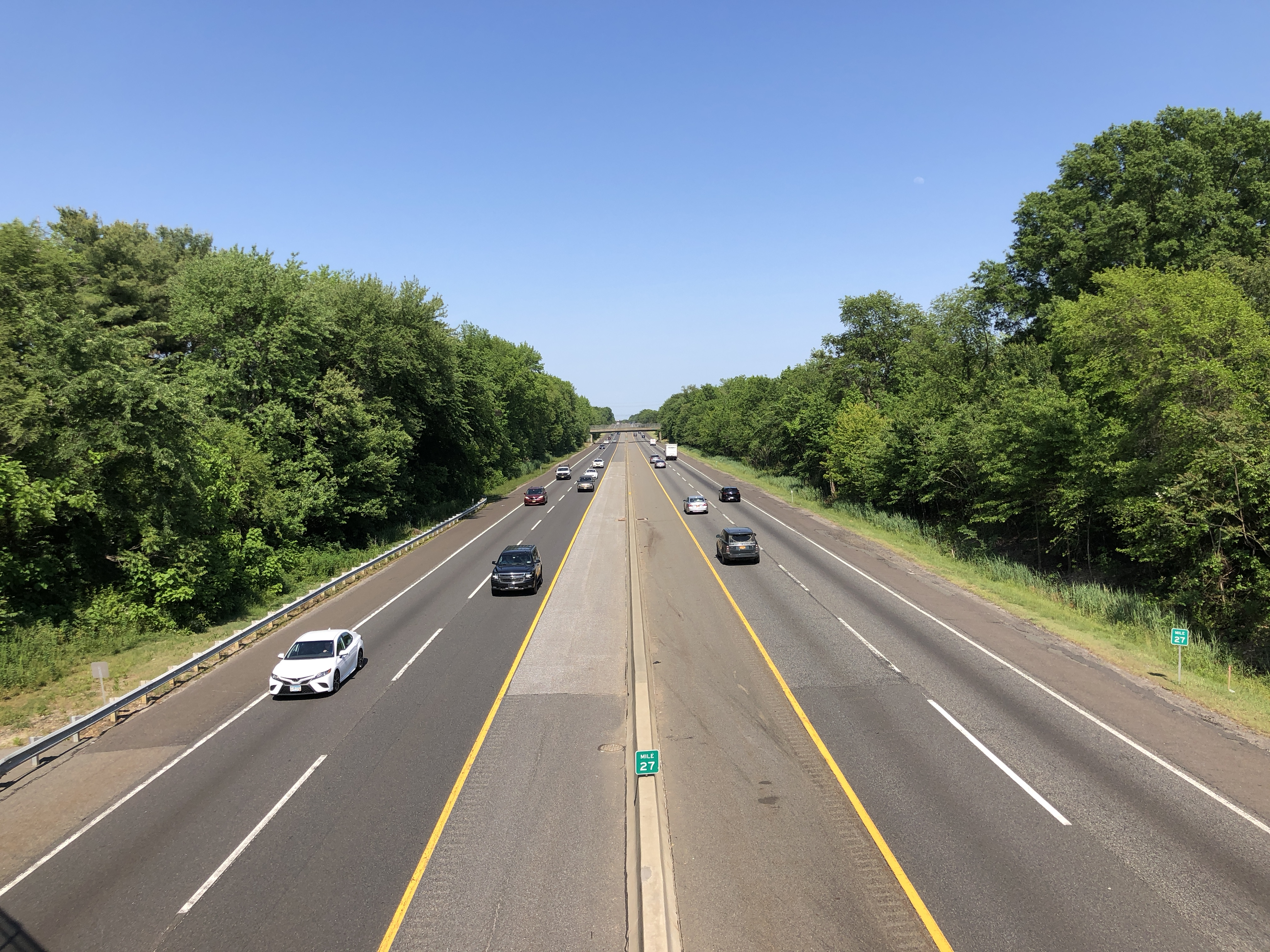
The northbound New Jersey Turnpike in Barrington

=== Roads and highways ===
As of May 2010, the borough had a total of 25.57 miles (41.15 km) of roadways, of which 17.95 miles (28.89 km) were maintained by the municipality, 5.22 miles (8.40 km) by Camden County, 1.39 miles (2.24 km) by the New Jersey Department of Transportation and 1.01 miles (1.63 km) by the New Jersey Turnpike Authority.

The New Jersey Turnpike is the most prominent highway traversing Barrington. It passes through for 1.0 mile (1.6 km), connecting Bellmawr on the west with Lawnside in the east. The closest exit is Interchange 3 in neighboring Bellmawr / Runnemede.

Other major roads that pass through the borough include Interstate 295, which passes through briefly, with Exit 29 connecting the expressway with U.S. Route 30 and Route 41.

=== Public transportation ===
NJ Transit bus service is available in the borough on routes 403 (between Turnersville and Camden) and 455 (between the Cherry Hill Mall and Paulsboro).

PATCO Speedline is a commuter rail system linking Philadelphia and Lindenwold. The stations closest to Barrington are Haddonfield and Woodcrest.

== Notable people ==
People who were born in, residents of, or otherwise closely associated with Barrington include:

- Nilsa Cruz-Perez (born 1961), politician who has represented the 5th Legislative District in the New Jersey Senate since 2014
- Sarah Elfreth (born 1988), politician who serves in the Maryland Senate, representing the 30th district
- Nick Foles (born 1989), quarterback who has played for the Philadelphia Eagles and Jacksonville Jaguars
- Patricia Egan Jones, politician who represented the 5th Legislative District in the New Jersey General Assembly from 2015 to 2020
- Al Kenders (1937–2013), catcher who played for the Philadelphia Phillies in 1961
- Bill Manlove (born 1933), football head coach who had a career record of 212–110–1 at Widener University, Delaware Valley College and La Salle University
- Charlie Manuel (born 1944), baseball executive for the Philadelphia Phillies, and a former professional baseball outfielder, coach, and manager in Major League Baseball
- Ernest F. Schuck (1929–2009), politician who served for seven years as mayor of Barrington and eight years in the New Jersey General Assembly, from 1974 to 1982, where he represented the 5th Legislative District
- Bo Wood (born 1945), former American football player and high school coach, who played in the NFL for the Atlanta Falcons.
