= Newton Township, Camden County, New Jersey =

Township in Camden County, New Jersey

Coordinates: 39.9043°N 75.0915°W

Newton Township was a township in New Jersey that existed initially within Gloucester County from its creation in 1695, and became part of Camden County when that county was formed in 1844, where it existed until its dissolution in 1871.

Newton Township was incorporated as a township by Royal Charter on June 1, 1695, within Gloucester County. The township was incorporated by an Act of the New Jersey Legislature on February 21, 1798.

On February 13, 1828, the city of Camden was formed within the township.

Newton Township became one of the original townships of the newly formed Camden County, on March 13, 1844.

On February 23, 1865, portions of the township were taken to create Haddon Township. On March 7, 1871, as a result of the “Act to revise and amend the charter of the city of Camden”, which had been approved February 14, 1871. This Act extinguished the old township of Newton by annexing all of its remaining territory to the City of Camden., and Newton Township was dissolved. Current municipalities included in the area that was formerly part of Newton Township include Haddon Township, Camden, Collingswood, Audubon, Haddonfield and Pennsauken Township.

== See also ==
- List of historical Camden County, New Jersey municipalities

== Sources ==
Span Of A Century 1828-1928 100 Years In The History Of Camden As A City, Compiled From Notes And Data Collected By Charles S. Boyer President Camden County Historical Society. Published By Centennial Anniversary Committee Of Camden, New Jersey
