= Runnemede, New Jersey =

Borough in Camden County, New Jersey, US

- Borough
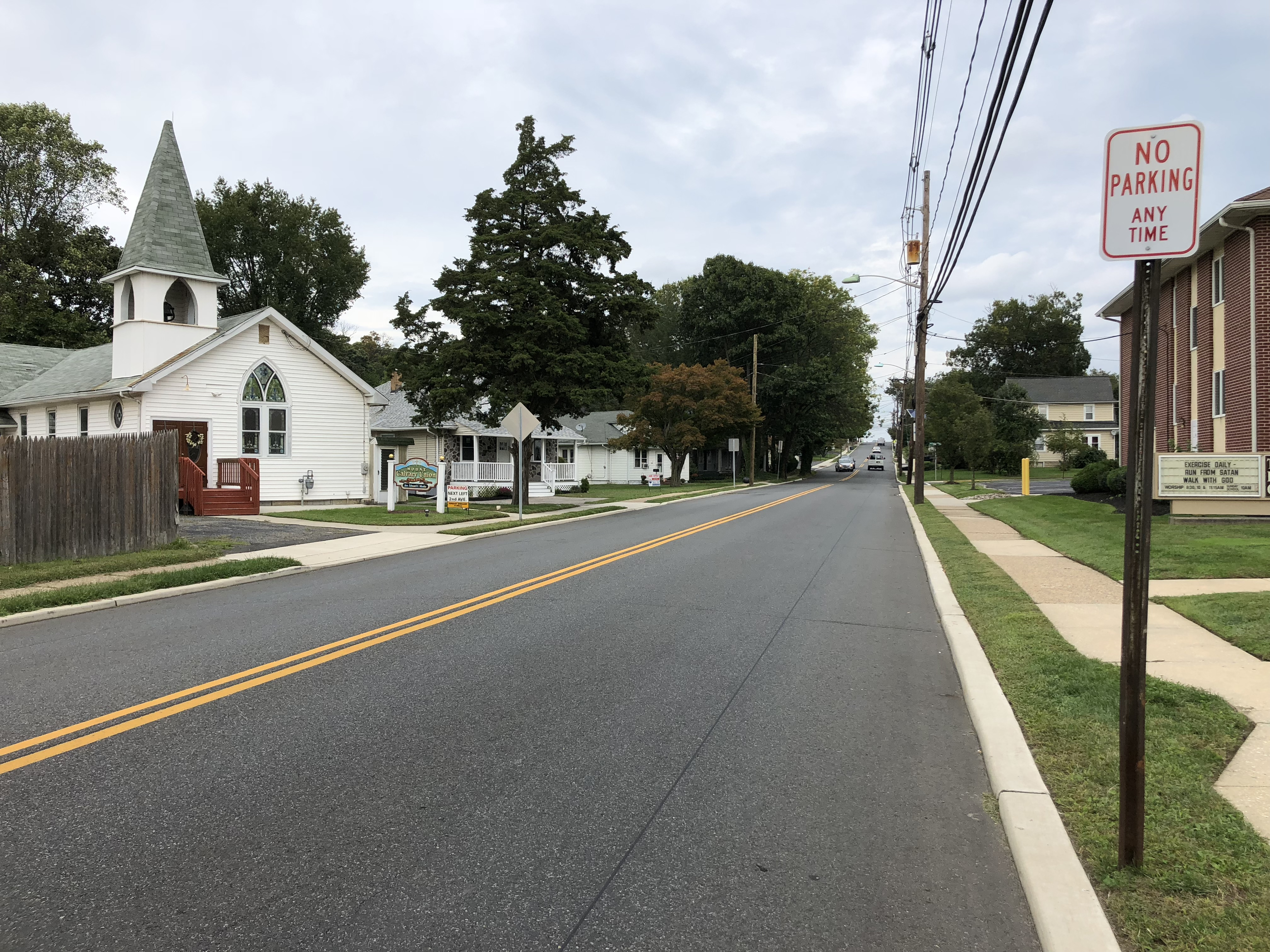
- Street in Runnemede, October 2018

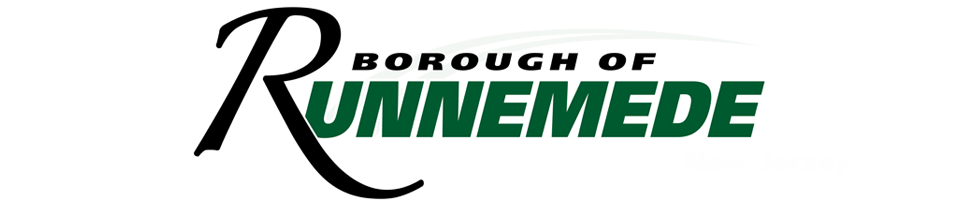
- wordmark

- Runnemede highlighted in Camden County. Inset: Location of Camden County highlighted in the State of New Jersey.

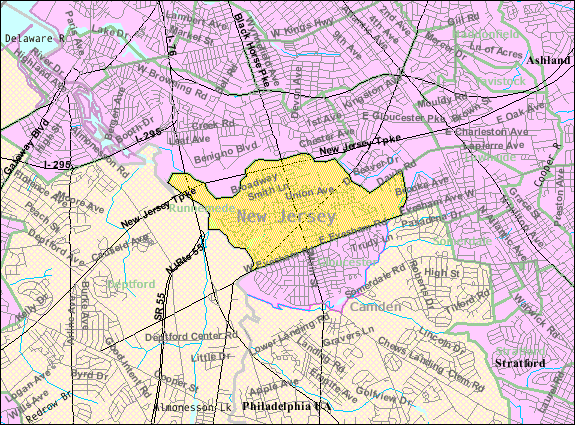
- Census Bureau map of Runnemede, New Jersey.

- Location in Camden County Location in New Jersey Location in the United States
- Coordinates: 39.853411°N 75.075502°W
- Country: United States
- State: New Jersey
- County: Camden
- European settlement: 1626
- Incorporated: April 24, 1926
- Named for: Runnymede, England

Government
  - Type: Borough
  - Body: Borough Council
  - Mayor: Nick Kappatos (D, term ends December 31, 2026)
  - Municipal clerk: Joyce Pinto

Area
  - Total: 2.10 sq mi (5.45 km^{2})
  - Land: 2.05 sq mi (5.31 km^{2})
  - Water: 0.054 sq mi (0.14 km^{2}) 2.56%
  - Rank: 402nd of 565 in state 17th of 37 in county
- Elevation: 69 ft (21 m)

Population (2020)
  - Total: 8,324
  - Estimate (2023): 8,338
  - Rank: 285th of 565 in state 16th of 37 in county
  - Density: 4,058.5/sq mi (1,567.0/km^{2})
  - Rank: 155th of 565 in state 19th of 37 in county
- Time zone: UTC−05:00 (Eastern (EST))
  - Summer (DST): UTC−04:00 (Eastern (EDT))
- ZIP Code: 08078
- Area code: 856 exchanges: 312, 931, 933, 939
- FIPS code: 3400765160
- GNIS feature ID: 0885382
- Website: www.runnemedenj.org

Runnemede is a borough in Camden County, in the U.S. state of New Jersey. As of the 2020 United States census, the borough's population was 8,324, a decrease of 144 (−1.7%) from the 2010 census count of 8,468, which in turn reflected a decline of 65 (−0.8%) from the 8,533 counted in the 2000 census.

Runnemede was authorized to incorporate as a borough by an act of the New Jersey Legislature on March 23, 1926, from portions of the now-defunct Centre Township, and was then made independent based on the results of a referendum held on April 24, 1926. Acts enabling creation of the boroughs of Bellmawr, Mount Ephraim, and Lawnside were passed during the same two-day period. The derivation of the borough's name is uncertain, though claims that it derives from a Native American term for "running water" have been refuted and connections to General George Meade or to "rum we need" for a nearby tavern are probably apocryphal. Sources have cited the name as coming from Runnymede, England.

== Geography ==
According to the United States Census Bureau, the borough had a total area of 2.11 square miles (5.45 km^{2}), including 2.05 square miles (5.31 km^{2}) of land and 0.05 square miles (0.14 km^{2}) of water (2.56%).

Unincorporated communities, localities and place names located partially or completely within the borough include Glendora.

The borough borders Barrington, Bellmawr, Gloucester Township and Magnolia in Camden County. Runnemede also borders Deptford Township in Gloucester County.

== Demographics ==
Historical population
Census	Pop.	Note	%±
1930	2,436		—
1940	2,835		16.4%
1950	4,217		48.7%
1960	8,396		99.1%
1970	10,475		24.8%
1980	9,461		−9.7%
1990	9,042		−4.4%
2000	8,533		−5.6%
2010	8,648		1.3%
2020	8,324		−3.7%
2023 (est.)	8,338	▲	0.2%
Population sources: 1930–2000 1930 1940–2000; 2000 2010 2020

=== 2020 census ===
As of the 2020 census, Runnemede had a population of 8,324. The median age was 39.5 years. 20.1% of residents were under the age of 18 and 16.6% of residents were 65 years of age or older. For every 100 females there were 95.2 males, and for every 100 females age 18 and over there were 90.7 males age 18 and over.

100.0% of residents lived in urban areas, while 0.0% lived in rural areas.

There were 3,374 households in Runnemede, of which 28.2% had children under the age of 18 living in them. Of all households, 41.7% were married-couple households, 19.4% were households with a male householder and no spouse or partner present, and 29.3% were households with a female householder and no spouse or partner present. About 29.6% of all households were made up of individuals and 12.5% had someone living alone who was 65 years of age or older.

There were 3,540 housing units, of which 4.7% were vacant. The homeowner vacancy rate was 1.5% and the rental vacancy rate was 4.8%.

Racial composition as of the 2020 census
Race	Number	Percent
White	6,738	80.9%
Black or African American	452	5.4%
American Indian and Alaska Native	41	0.5%
Asian	313	3.8%
Native Hawaiian and Other Pacific Islander	0	0.0%
Some other race	276	3.3%
Two or more races	504	6.1%
Hispanic or Latino (of any race)	752	9.0%

=== 2010 census ===
The 2010 United States census counted 8,468 people, 3,370 households, and 2,214 families in the borough. The population density was 4,117.2 per square mile (1,589.7/km^{2}). There were 3,548 housing units at an average density of 1,725.1 per square mile (666.1/km^{2}). The racial makeup was 88.52% (7,496) White, 4.72% (400) Black or African American, 0.30% (25) Native American, 2.63% (223) Asian, 0.00% (0) Pacific Islander, 2.18% (185) from other races, and 1.64% (139) from two or more races. Hispanic or Latino of any race were 6.09% (516) of the population.

Of the 3,370 households, 26.7% had children under the age of 18; 46.5% were married couples living together; 13.2% had a female householder with no husband present and 34.3% were non-families. Of all households, 28.8% were made up of individuals and 12.4% had someone living alone who was 65 years of age or older. The average household size was 2.51 and the average family size was 3.11.

20.9% of the population were under the age of 18, 8.9% from 18 to 24, 27.1% from 25 to 44, 28.4% from 45 to 64, and 14.7% who were 65 years of age or older. The median age was 40.1 years. For every 100 females, the population had 92.6 males. For every 100 females ages 18 and older there were 89.5 males.

The Census Bureau's 2006–2010 American Community Survey showed that (in 2010 inflation-adjusted dollars) median household income was $53,454 (with a margin of error of +/− $4,014) and the median family income was $62,899 (+/− $4,849). Males had a median income of $43,016 (+/− $1,759) versus $38,854 (+/− $5,740) for females. The per capita income for the borough was $26,260 (+/− $1,884). About 6.9% of families and 7.6% of the population were below the poverty line, including 6.7% of those under age 18 and 11.4% of those age 65 or over.

=== 2000 census ===
As of the 2000 United States census there were 8,533 people, 3,376 households, and 2,275 families residing in the borough. The population density was 4,084.2 inhabitants per square mile (1,576.9/km^{2}). There were 3,510 housing units at an average density of 1,680.0 per square mile (648.7/km^{2}). The racial makeup of the borough was 91.77% White, 3.76% African American, 0.11% Native American, 1.55% Asian, 0.01% Pacific Islander, 1.22% from other races, and 1.58% from two or more races. Hispanic or Latino of any race were 3.59% of the population.

There were 3,376 households, out of which 30.3% had children under the age of 18 living with them, 47.6% were married couples living together, 14.2% had a female householder with no husband present, and 32.6% were non-families. 27.8% of all households were made up of individuals, and 11.8% had someone living alone who was 65 years of age or older. The average household size was 2.52 and the average family size was 3.08.

In the borough the population was spread out, with 23.2% under the age of 18, 8.5% from 18 to 24, 30.5% from 25 to 44, 22.2% from 45 to 64, and 15.6% who were 65 years of age or older. The median age was 38 years. For every 100 females, there were 92.6 males. For every 100 females age 18 and over, there were 88.3 males.

The median income for a household in the borough was $41,126, and the median income for a family was $50,127. Males had a median income of $37,705 versus $28,062 for females. The per capita income for the borough was $19,143. About 3.1% of families and 5.6% of the population were below the poverty line, including 5.1% of those under age 18 and 6.4% of those age 65 or over.

== Economy ==
Mister Softee, an ice cream truck franchiser with about 350 franchisees operating 625 trucks in 18 states, has been headquartered in Runnemede since 1958.

== Government ==
=== Local government ===
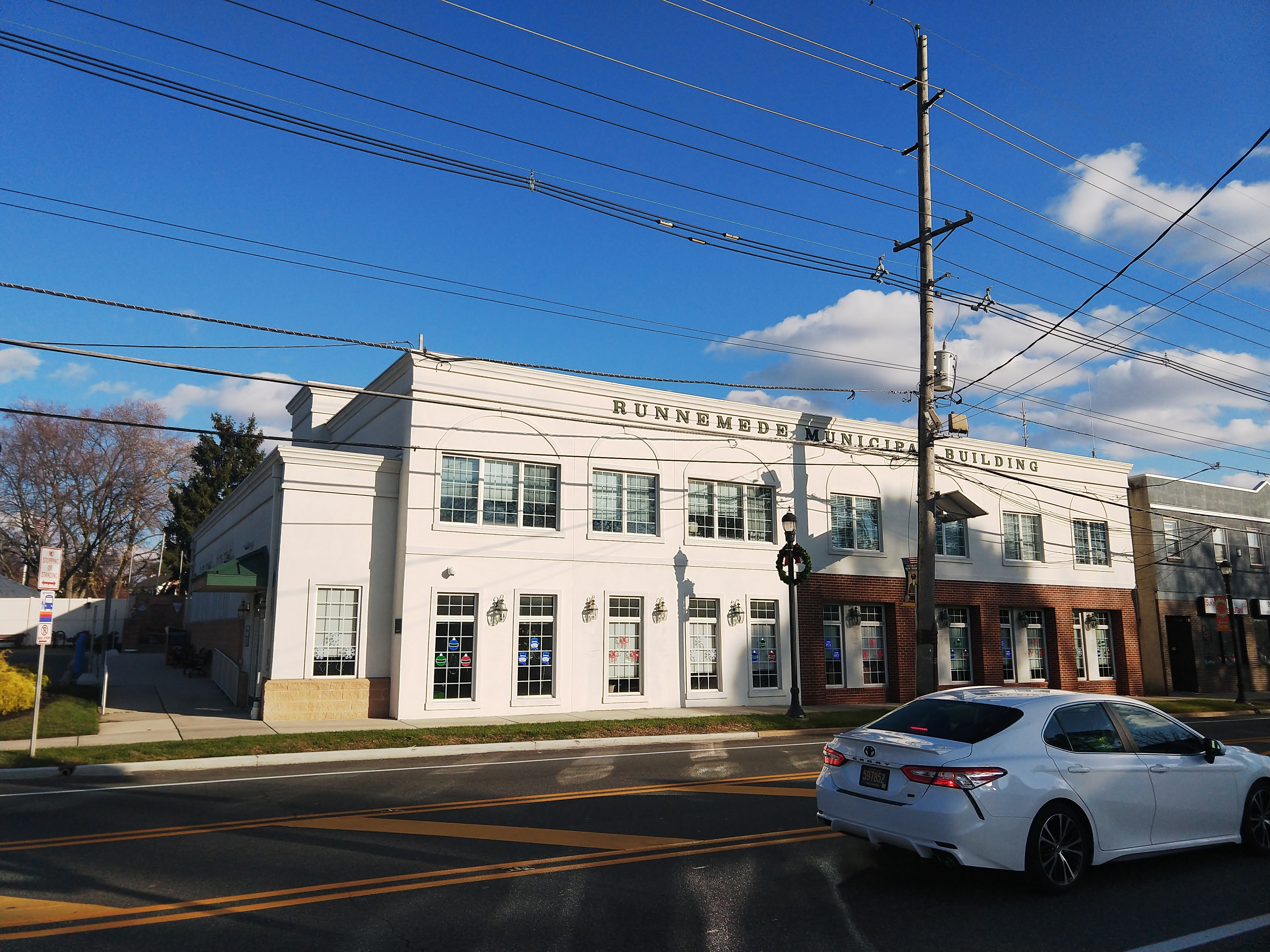
Runnemede Municipal Building

Runnemede is governed under the borough form of New Jersey municipal government, which is used in 218 municipalities (of the 564) statewide, making it the most common form of government in New Jersey. The governing body is comprised of a mayor and a borough council, with all positions elected at-large on a partisan basis as part of the November general election. A mayor is elected directly by the voters to a four-year term of office. The borough council includes six members elected to serve three-year terms on a staggered basis, with two seats coming up for election each year in a three-year cycle. The borough form of government used by Runnemede is a "weak mayor / strong council" government in which council members act as the legislative body with the mayor presiding at meetings and voting only in the event of a tie. The mayor can veto ordinances subject to an override by a two-thirds majority vote of the council. The mayor makes committee and liaison assignments for council members, and most appointments are made by the mayor with the advice and consent of the council.

As of 2023, the mayor of Runnemede is Democrat Nick Kappatos, whose term of office ends December 31, 2026. Members of the Borough Council are Council President Patricia Tartaglia Passio (D, 2023), Luis "Rich" Cepero (D, 2025), Robert Farrell (D, 2025), Eleanor M. Kelly (D, 2024), Craig Laubenstein (D, 2024) and John Ranieri (D, 2023).

=== Federal, state and county representation ===
Runnemede is located in the 1st Congressional District and is part of New Jersey's 5th state legislative district.

For the 119th United States Congress, New Jersey's 1st congressional district is represented by Donald Norcross (D, Camden). New Jersey is represented in the United States Senate by Democrats Cory Booker (Newark, term ends 2027) and Andy Kim (Moorestown, term ends 2031).

For the 2026–2027 session, the 5th legislative district of the New Jersey Legislature is represented in the State Senate by Nilsa Cruz-Perez (D, Barrington) and in the General Assembly by Bill Moen (D, Camden) and William Spearman (D, Camden).

Camden County is governed by a Board of County Commissioners composed of seven members chosen at-large in partisan elections for three-year terms on a staggered basis by the residents of the county, with either two or three seats up for election each year as part of the November general election. At a reorganization meeting held in January after each election, the newly constituted Board of Commissioners selects one member to serve as Director and another as Deputy Director, each serving a one-year term in that role. As of 2025, Camden County's Commissioners are: Commissioner Director Louis Cappelli Jr. (D, Collingswood, 2026), Commissioner Deputy Director Edward T. McDonnell (D, Pennsauken Township, 2025), Virginia Ruiz Betteridge (D, Runnemede, 2025), Almar Dyer (D, Pennsauken Township, 2027), Melinda Kane (D, Cherry Hill, 2027), Jeffrey L. Nash (D, Winslow Township, 2027), and Jonathan L. Young Sr. (D, Berlin Township, 2026).

Camden County's constitutional officers are: Clerk Pamela Rosen Lampitt (D, Cherry Hill, 2029) Sheriff Chuck Billingham (D, Gloucester City, 2027) and Surrogate Michelle Gentek-Mayer (D, Gloucester Township, 2025).

=== Politics ===
As of March 2011, there were a total of 5,547 registered voters in Runnemede, of which 2,902 (52.3%) were registered as Democrats, 572 (10.3%) were registered as Republicans and 2,070 (37.3%) were registered as Unaffiliated. There were 3 voters registered as Libertarians or Greens.

Gubernatorial election results for Runnemede
Year	Republican		Democratic		Third party(ies)	
Year	No.	%	No.	%	No.	%
2025	1,263	39.72%	1,901	59.78%	16	0.50%
2021	1,186	46.95%	1,311	51.90%	29	1.15%
2017	654	36.48%	1,096	61.13%	43	2.40%
2013	1,202	61.67%	719	36.89%	28	1.44%
2009	933	41.65%	1,096	48.93%	211	9.42%
2005	767	35.07%	1,291	59.03%	129	5.90%

In the 2012 presidential election, Democrat Barack Obama received 64.2% of the vote (2,348 cast), ahead of Republican Mitt Romney with 34.9% (1,275 votes), and other candidates with 0.9% (32 votes), among the 3,694 ballots cast by the borough's 5,918 registered voters (39 ballots were spoiled), for a turnout of 62.4%. In the 2008 presidential election, Democrat Barack Obama received 59.4% of the vote (2,388 cast), ahead of Republican John McCain, who received around 37.0% (1,486 votes), with 4,021 ballots cast among the borough's 5,609 registered voters, for a turnout of 71.7%. In the 2004 presidential election, Democrat John Kerry received 59.4% of the vote (2,407 ballots cast), outpolling Republican George W. Bush, who received around 42.9% (1,738 votes), with 4,050 ballots cast among the borough's 5,673 registered voters, for a turnout percentage of 71.4.

United States presidential election results for Runnemede
Year	Republican		Democratic		Third party(ies)	
Year	No.	%	No.	%	No.	%
2024	1,992	47.55%	2,135	50.97%	62	1.48%
2020	2,048	44.61%	2,479	54.00%	64	1.39%
2016	1,649	44.57%	1,917	51.81%	134	3.62%
2012	1,275	34.88%	2,348	64.24%	32	0.88%
2008	1,486	36.96%	2,388	59.39%	147	3.66%
2004	1,738	40.99%	2,407	56.77%	95	2.24%

In the 2013 gubernatorial election, Republican Chris Christie received 61.7% of the vote (1,202 cast), ahead of Democrat Barbara Buono with 36.9% (719 votes), and other candidates with 1.4% (28 votes), among the 2,057 ballots cast by the borough's 5,835 registered voters (108 ballots were spoiled), for a turnout of 35.3%. In the 2009 gubernatorial election, Democrat Jon Corzine received 48.9% of the vote (1,096 ballots cast), ahead of both Republican Chris Christie with 41.7% (933 votes) and Independent Chris Daggett with 5.8% (131 votes), with 2,240 ballots cast among the borough's 5,584 registered voters, yielding a 40.1% turnout.

United States Senate election results for Runnemede1
Year	Republican		Democratic		Third party(ies)	
Year	No.	%	No.	%	No.	%
2024	1,721	42.41%	2,270	55.94%	67	1.65%
2018	1,201	42.27%	1,410	49.63%	230	8.10%
2012	1,084	31.61%	2,298	67.02%	47	1.37%
2006	911	38.39%	1,389	58.53%	73	3.08%

United States Senate election results for Runnemede2
Year	Republican		Democratic		Third party(ies)	
Year	No.	%	No.	%	No.	%
2020	1,909	42.68%	2,507	56.05%	57	1.27%
2014	582	36.06%	1,000	61.96%	32	1.98%
2013	412	42.74%	538	55.81%	14	1.45%
2008	1,309	35.98%	2,272	62.45%	57	1.57%

== Education ==
The Runnemede Public School District serves students in pre-kindergarten through eighth grade. As of the 2018–19 school year, the district, comprised of three schools, had an enrollment of 814 students and 68.5 classroom teachers (on an FTE basis), for a student–teacher ratio of 11.9:1. Schools in the district (with 2018–19 enrollment data from the National Center for Education Statistics) are Aline Bingham Elementary School with 174 students in grades K–3, Grace Downing Elementary School with 167 students in grades K–3 and Mary E. Volz Elementary and Middle School with 469 students in grades 4–8.

For ninth through twelfth grades, public school students attend Triton Regional High School, one of three high schools that are part of the Black Horse Pike Regional School District, which also serves students from Bellmawr Borough and Gloucester Township. As of the 2018–19 school year, the high school had an enrollment of 1,159 students and 95.5 classroom teachers (on an FTE basis), for a student–teacher ratio of 12.1:1. The two other schools in the district are Highland Regional High School and Timber Creek Regional High School, which serve students from Gloucester Township, based on their address. The district is governed by a nine-member board of education that oversees the operation of the district; seats on the board are allocated to the constituent municipalities based on population, with one seat allocated to Runnemede.

St. Teresa Regional School is a Pre-K–8 elementary school, that was once attended by Olympic Gold Medal-winning figure skater Tara Lipinski, and operates under the auspices of the Roman Catholic Diocese of Camden.

== Transportation ==
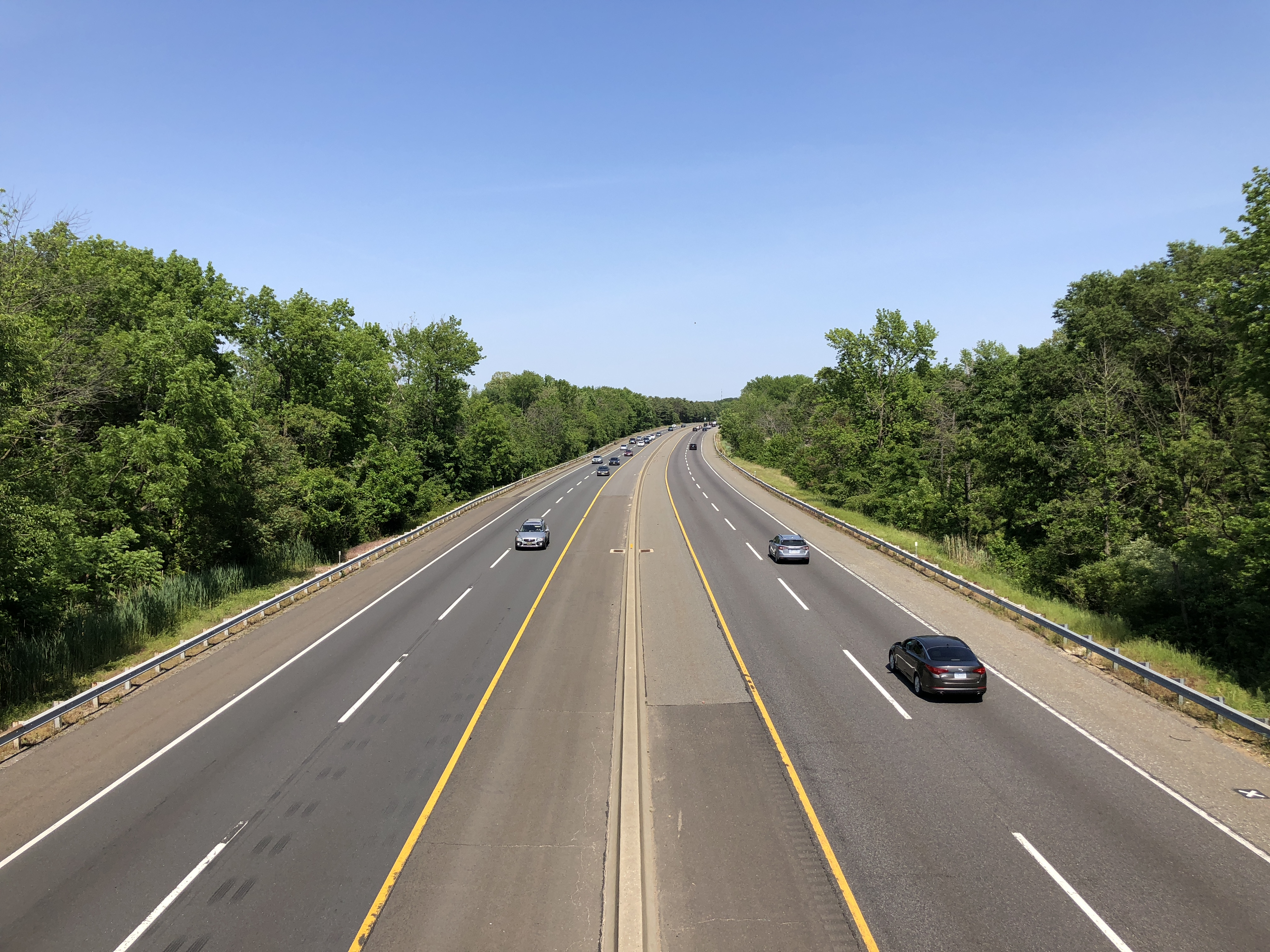
The northbound New Jersey Turnpike in Runnemede

=== Roads and highways ===
As of May 2010, the borough had a total of 31.16 miles (50.15 km) of roadways, of which 25.32 miles (40.75 km) were maintained by the municipality, 2.34 miles (3.77 km) by Camden County and 1.17 miles (1.88 km) by the New Jersey Department of Transportation and 2.33 miles (3.75 km) by the New Jersey Turnpike Authority.

The New Jersey Turnpike is the most prominent highway which passes through Runnemede. The turnpike crosses through the northern part of the borough, and part of an interchange, Exit 3, is located within Runnemede. The interchange and toll gate are located near the boundary with Bellmawr, with a total of six lanes at the gate.

Several state highways pass through Runnemede, including Route 168 and Route 41, which intersect in the borough. The North-South Freeway (Route 42) passes through the northwest briefly, but without any connections between the freeway and the borough.

Major county roads include CR 544 which runs along the southern border.

=== Public transportation ===
NJ Transit bus service between the borough and Philadelphia is available on the 400 route, with local service available on the 455 route.

== Notable people ==
People who were born in, residents of, or otherwise closely associated with Runnemede include:

- Brigid Callahan Harrison (born 1965), Professor of Political Science and Law at Montclair State University
- Michael Iaconelli (born 1972), 2006 Bassmaster Angler of the Year
- Bill Moen (born 1986), politician who has represented the 5th Legislative District in the New Jersey Assembly since January 14, 2020
- Jack O'Halloran (born 1943), Heavyweight boxer and actor who appeared in King Kong, Superman and Superman II
- Tim Tetrick (born 1981), harness racing driver
- Theresa Anne Tull (born 1936), diplomat who served as the United States Ambassador to Guyana (1987–1990) and Brunei from 1993 until 1996
