= Lower Camden County Regional School District =

School district in New Jersey, United States

The Lower Camden County Regional School District was a regional public school district serving students in seventh through twelfth grades in Camden County, in the U.S. state of New Jersey. The district served the constituent communities of Berlin Township, Chesilhurst, Clementon, Lindenwold, Pine Hill, Waterford Township and Winslow Township. In a referendum held in May 1998, voters approved the dissolution of the district.

Schools in the district included:

- Edgewood Junior High School and Edgewood Regional High School in Winslow Township, serving Chesilhurst, Waterford Township and Winslow Township
- Overbrook Junior High School in Lindenwold, serving Berlin Township, Clementon, Lindenwold, Pine Hill and Winslow Township
- Lower Camden County Regional High School / Overbrook Senior High School in Pine Hill, serving Berlin Township, Clementon, Lindenwold and Pine Hill

== History ==
The school district was established in 1938, after a referendum in which Chesilhurst, Clementon, Lindenwold, Pine Hill and Winslow Township voted to join and both Berlin Township and Waterford Township opted out. Lower Camden County Regional High School opened in October 1939, four months earlier than expected, with an enrollment of 700 students, after having been constructed at a cost of $575,000 (equivalent to $13 million in 2024), of which $258,000 was covered by a grant from the Public Works Administration. Prior to the school's opening, about a third of students had attended Hammonton High School. It served students from up to ten municipalities at one point. The population soon began to grow, however, and Edgewood Regional High School (now Winslow Township High School) was founded in Winslow Township. The original school took the name Overbrook Regional Senior High School in the 1950s, and joined its sister school Edgewood as part of the district.

After further expansion of the school district, in 1969 the building was renamed Overbrook Regional Junior High School. Following the dissolution of the district, students from Waterford Township began attending Hammonton High School as part of a sending/receiving relationship with the Hammonton Public Schools. Overbrook High School, part of the Pine Hill Schools, serves students from Pine Hill, with Berlin Township and Clementon participating in sending / receiving relationships. Lindenwold High School opened in September 2001 to serve students from the borough
