= Berlin Township Public Schools =

School district in Camden County, New Jersey, US

Address
- 225 Grove Avenue West Berlin, Camden County, New Jersey, 08091; United States
- Coordinates: 39.80527°N 74.931445°W

District information
- Grades: PreK-8
- Superintendent: Edythe Austermuhl
- Business administrator: Megan Stoddart
- Schools: 2

Students and staff
- Enrollment: 609 (as of 2020–21)
- Faculty: 55.1 FTEs
- Student–teacher ratio: 11.1:1

Other information
- District Factor Group: CD
- Website: www.btwpschools.org
| Ind. | Per pupil | District spending | Rank (*) | K-8 average | %± vs. average |
|---|---|---|---|---|---|
| 1A | Total Spending | $19,171 | 40 | $18,891 | 1.5% |
| 1 | Budgetary Cost | 12,222 | 12 | 14,159 | −13.7% |
| 2 | Classroom Instruction | 7,484 | 8 | 8,659 | −13.6% |
| 6 | Support Services | 2,123 | 28 | 2,167 | −2.0% |
| 8 | Administrative Cost | 1,253 | 5 | 1,547 | −19.0% |
| 10 | Operations & Maintenance | 1,167 | 12 | 1,612 | −27.6% |
| 13 | Extracurricular Activities | 54 | 13 | 104 | −48.1% |
| 16 | Median Teacher Salary | 59,746 | 33 | 61,136 |
Data from NJDoE 2014 Taxpayers' Guide to Education Spending. *Of K-8 districts with 401-750 students. Lowest spending=1; Highest=64

The Berlin Township Public Schools are a community public school district that serves students in pre-kindergarten through eighth grade from Berlin Township, in Camden County, in the U.S. state of New Jersey.

As of the 2020–21 school year, the district, comprised of two schools, had an enrollment of 609 students and 55.1 classroom teachers (on an FTE basis), for a student–teacher ratio of 11.1:1.

The district participates in the Interdistrict Public School Choice Program, which allows non-resident students to attend school in the district at no cost to their parents, with tuition covered by the resident district. Available slots are announced annually by grade.

The district had been classified by the New Jersey Department of Education as being in District Factor Group "CD", the sixth-highest of eight groupings. District Factor Groups organize districts statewide to allow comparison by common socioeconomic characteristics of the local districts. From lowest socioeconomic status to highest, the categories are A, B, CD, DE, FG, GH, I and J.

Public school students in ninth through twelfth grades from Berlin Township and Clementon attend Overbrook High School in Pine Hill as part of a sending/receiving relationship with the Pine Hill Schools. A representative from Berlin Township serves on the board of education of the Pine Hill Schools. As of the 2022–23 school year, the high school had an enrollment of 792 students and 60.9 classroom teachers (on an FTE basis), for a student–teacher ratio of 13.0:1.

== History ==
The Huster Building, formerly used as a kindergarten and now used for administration, is named for Robert R. Huster, a Berlin Township resident who was killed in action on April 8, 1967, during the Vietnam War.

== Schools ==
Schools in the district (with 2020–21 enrollment data from the National Center for Education Statistics) are:

Elementary school

- John F. Kennedy Elementary School with 279 students in PreK through 3rd grade
  - Melissa Carey, principal

Middle school

- Dwight D. Eisenhower Middle School with 325 students in grades 4–8
  - Marilyn Bright, principal

== Administration ==
Core members of the district's administration are:

- Adam Lee, superintendent
- Megan Stoddart, business administrator and board secretary

== Board of education ==
The district's board of education is comprised of nine members who set policy and oversee the fiscal and educational operation of the district through its administration. As a Type II school district, the board's trustees are elected directly by voters to serve three-year terms of office on a staggered basis, with three seats up for election each year held (since 2012) as part of the November general election. The board appoints a superintendent to oversee the district's day-to-day operations and a business administrator to supervise the business functions of the district.
