= Lower Camden County Regional High School =

High school in New Jersey, United States

Coordinates: 39.776712°N 74.965858°W

Lower Camden County Regional High School was founded in 1939 in Pine Hill, in Camden County, in the U.S. state of New Jersey, as part of the Lower Camden County Regional School District. As the school district grew, Edgewood Regional High School was built in 1958 and Lower Camden County Regional was renamed Overbrook Regional High School.

== History ==
After the school district was established in 1938, the high school opened as Lower Camden County Regional High School in October 1939 with an enrollment of 700 students from Chesilhurst, Clementon, Lindenwold, Pine Hill and Winslow Township, after having been constructed at a cost of $575,000 (equivalent to $13.3 million in 2025), of which $258,000 was covered by a grant from the Public Works Administration. Prior to the school's opening, about a third of students had attended Hammonton High School. It served students from up to ten municipalities at one point. The population soon began to grow, however, and Edgewood Regional High School (now Winslow Township High School) was founded in Winslow Township. The school took the name Overbrook Regional Senior High School in the 1950s, and joined its sister school Edgewood as part of the district.

After further expansion of the school district, in 1969 the building was renamed Overbrook Regional Junior High School.

In 1999, each of the individual school boards voted to dissolve LCCRHSD. As part of the breakup, Overbrook was taken over by the Pine Hill Schools, which became a K-12 district.
