= Lindenwold (disambiguation) =

Lindenwold may refer to:

- Lindenwold, New Jersey
- Lindenwold High School
- Lindenwold Public Schools
- Lindenwold station
- Lindenwold estate
- Lindenwold (Morristown, New Jersey), listed on the NRHP in Morris County, New Jersey
