= Damien Covington =

American football player (1972–2002)

No. 57
- Position: Linebacker

Personal information
- Born: December 4, 1972; Berlin Township, New Jersey, U.S.
- Died: November 29, 2002 (aged 29); Lindenwold, New Jersey, U.S.
- Listed height: 5 ft 11 in (1.80 m)
- Listed weight: 236 lb (107 kg)

Career information
- High school: Overbrook (Pine Hill, New Jersey)
- College: NC State
- NFL draft: 1995: 3rd round, 5th overall pick

Career history
- Buffalo Bills (1995–1997)

Awards and highlights
- 2× First-team All-ACC (1993, 1994)

Career NFL statistics
- Tackles: 103
- Sacks: 0.5
- Interceptions: 1
- Stats at Pro Football Reference

Damien Emere Covington (December 4, 1972 – November 29, 2002) was an American professional football linebacker in the National Football League (NFL). He was a third round selection in the 1995 NFL draft by the Buffalo Bills out of North Carolina State University. He played for the Bills for three seasons (1995–1997). He was killed in an attempted robbery while at a friend's apartment.

Raised in Berlin Township, New Jersey, Covington attended Edgewood Regional High School for his first three years and then transferred to Overbrook High School in Pine Hill, New Jersey.
