= Edgewood Regional High School =

Defunct high school in Camden County, New Jersey, US

Location
- 10 Coopers Folly Road; Winslow Township, Camden County, New Jersey; United States
- 39.7458°N 74.9076°W

Information
- Type: Public high school
- Opened: 1958
- Closed: 2001
- School district: Lower Camden County Regional School District
- Grades: 9th-12th
- Colors: Kelly Green; White
- Nickname: Eagles
- Rival: Overbrook High School
- Newspaper: Aquila
- Yearbook: Pearl & Ivy

Edgewood Regional High School is the original name of Winslow Township High School that opened in 1958. Though the mailing address of the school was Atco, the site actually resided in the Tansboro section of Winslow Township, in Camden County, in the U.S. state of New Jersey. The school's name changed in 2001 due to the breakup of the Lower Camden County Regional School District (L.C.C.R.H.S.) which consisted of Edgewood and Overbrook Regional High School. The buildings were turned over to the Winslow Township School District and became Winslow Township High School. Likewise Overbrook dropped the "regional" part of its name and became Overbrook High School (part of the Pine Hill Schools). At the time of the district dissolution, Edgewood was receiving students from Winslow Township, Waterford Township and Chesilhurst. Waterford Township reached an agreement with Hammonton to send its students to Hammonton High School rather than the newly renamed Winslow Township High School.

== History ==
Students from Berlin attended the district's high school as part of a sending/receiving relationship with the Berlin Borough School District until Eastern Regional High School opened in September 1965.

== Notable achievements ==
- The boys track team won the Group III indoor track championship in 1960 and in Group IV in 1985 (as co-champion). The girls team won the Group IV title in 1984.
- The boys track team won the Group II spring / outdoor track state championship in 1965 and won the Group IV title in 1983-1985.
- The Edgewood Eagles varsity baseball team won the New Jersey State Interscholastic Athletic Association (NJSIAA) New Jersey state Group III title in 1978 (vs. Parsippany High School) and 1979 (vs. Pascack Hills High School), which at that time made Edgewood only the second public school to win back-to-back championships. The team also won the Group III state title in 1989 (vs. Paramus High School) and won South Jersey Group III state sectional titles in 1963 and 1965. The 1978 team finished the season with a record of 19-5 after winning the Group III title with a 2-0 win against Parsippany in the championship game at Mercer County Park. The 1979 team repeated as winner in Group III after defeating Pascack Hills by a score of 3-2 in the finals. An 11-1 win in the playoff finals against Paramus gave the team the 1989 Group III state championship and a 17-5 season record.
- The 1980 girls basketball team finished the season with a 21-6 record after winning the Group III state championship game by a score of 52-51 against a Pascack Valley High School team that came into the finals of the tournament undefeated and had been ahead by eight points with two minutes remaining in the game.
- In 1979, Edgewood varsity sports won five (5) South Jersey Group III titles in boys soccer, boys basketball, baseball, girls and boys track.
- The boys track team won the indoor relay championship in Group IV in 1985 and 1986 (as co-champion)
- The Edgewood Eagles marching band won the Tournament of Bands Chapter I, Group I Championships in 1990 and went on to place 3rd on the Atlantic Coast.
- The Edgewood Eagles Varsity Golf Team won the Olympic Conference Championship in 1994. The team was coached by Harvey Miller and Tom Miller. It was the first and only golf championship that has ever been won by the Eagles.

== Notable alumni ==
- Eugene Chojnacki, class of 1963, Commander of the New Jersey Air National Guard from 2004–2006, retiring at the rank of Major General
- Damien Covington (1972–2002), linebacker who played for three seasons for the Buffalo Bills
- Lee DeRamus (born 1972, class of 1989), wide receiver who played for two seasons in the NFL for the New Orleans Saints
- Ed Forchion (born 1964, class of 1982), cannabis decriminalization advocate (known as NJWeedman, political activist and perennial political candidate
- Dennis Mitchell (born 1966, class of 1984), track and field athlete, winner of the gold medal in the 4 × 100 m relay at the 1992 Summer Olympics
- James Rolfe (born 1980, class of 1999), filmmaker and creator of the Angry Video Game Nerd character
