= Long-a-Coming Depot =

Berlin
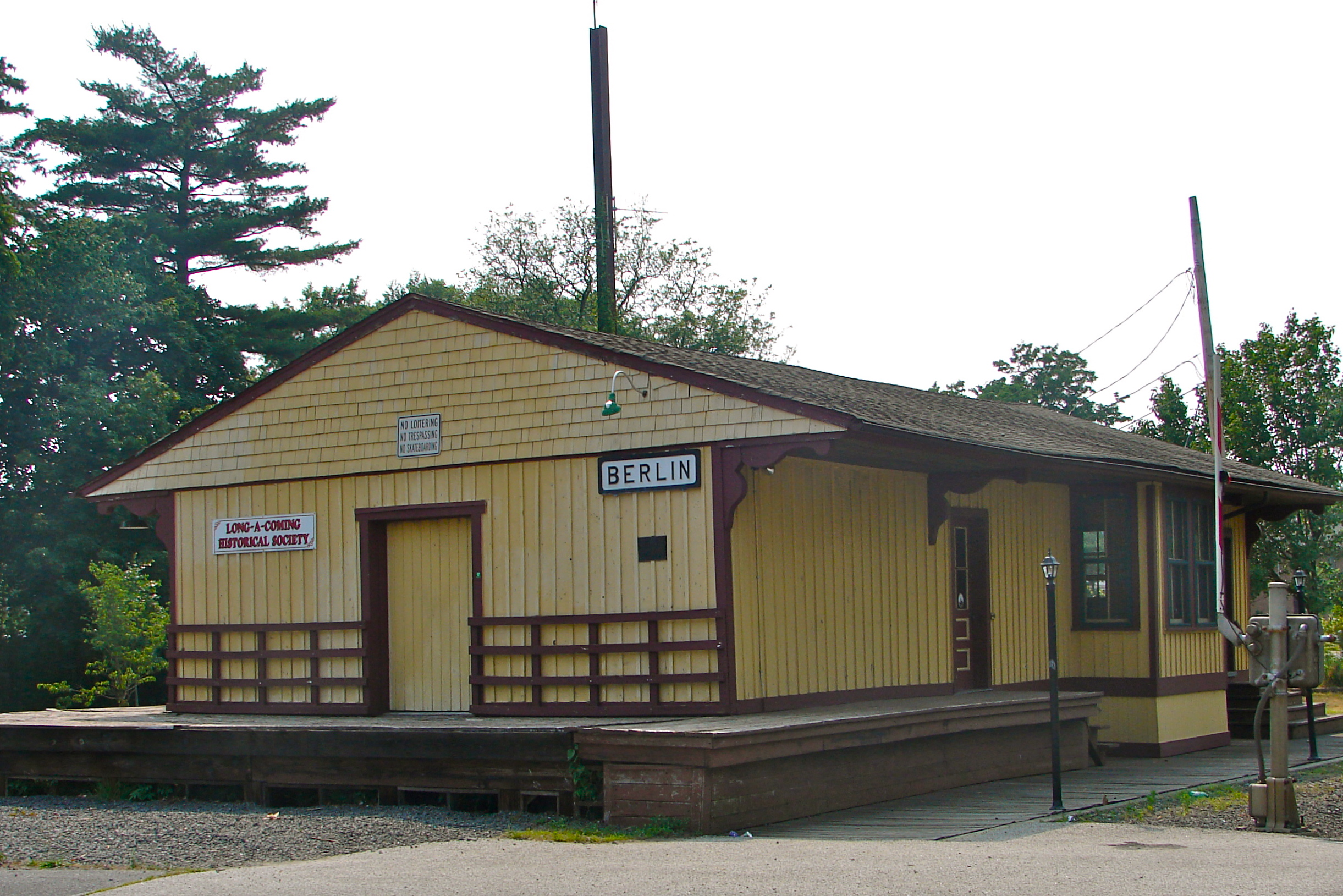
- The Longacoming depot, signed as Berlin, in June 2011.

General information
- Location: 65 Washington Avenue, Berlin, New Jersey
- Coordinates: 39°47′38″N 74°55′34″W

History
- Opened: November 21, 1853
- Closed: 1960s
- Rebuilt: 1856
- Former names: Longacoming (November 21, 1853–June 21, 1867)

Former services
Preceding station	Pennsylvania-Reading Seashore Lines	Following station
Reed Crossing toward Camden	WJ&S Main Line	Bishops Bridge toward Atlantic City
- Long-a-Coming Depot
- U.S. National Register of Historic Places
- New Jersey Register of Historic Places
- Interactive map of Long-a-Coming Depot
- Area: 4.6 acres (1.9 ha)
- Built: 1856
- Architectural style: Italianate
- NRHP reference No.: 97000063
- NJRHP No.: 3017

Significant dates
- Added to NRHP: February 14, 1997
- Designated NJRHP: December 30, 1996
Location

Berlin, also known as the Long-a-Coming Depot, is located in Berlin, Camden County, New Jersey, United States, between East Taunton and Washington Avenues, abutting the New Jersey Transit Atlantic City Line tracks. The station was built in 1856 and added to the National Register of Historic Places on February 14, 1997 for its significance in transportation.

== History ==
The Camden and Atlantic Railroad built a rail line in 1853 that ran parallel to the main road between Philadelphia, Pennsylvania and Atlantic City, New Jersey. The station was built along the rail line in 1856. In 1867, the station name was changed to Berlin. The station was closed in the 1960s due to declining passenger numbers. The Pennsylvania-Reading Seashore Lines (PRSL) railway company attempted to demolish the station in 1968, but was unsuccessful.

The station was restored in 1994 by the Long-a-Coming Historical Society. The station now serves as the meeting place for the historical society and several other area organizations.

== See also ==
- List of the oldest buildings in New Jersey
- National Register of Historic Places listings in Camden County, New Jersey
