= Overbrook High School (New Jersey) =

High school in Camden County, New Jersey, US

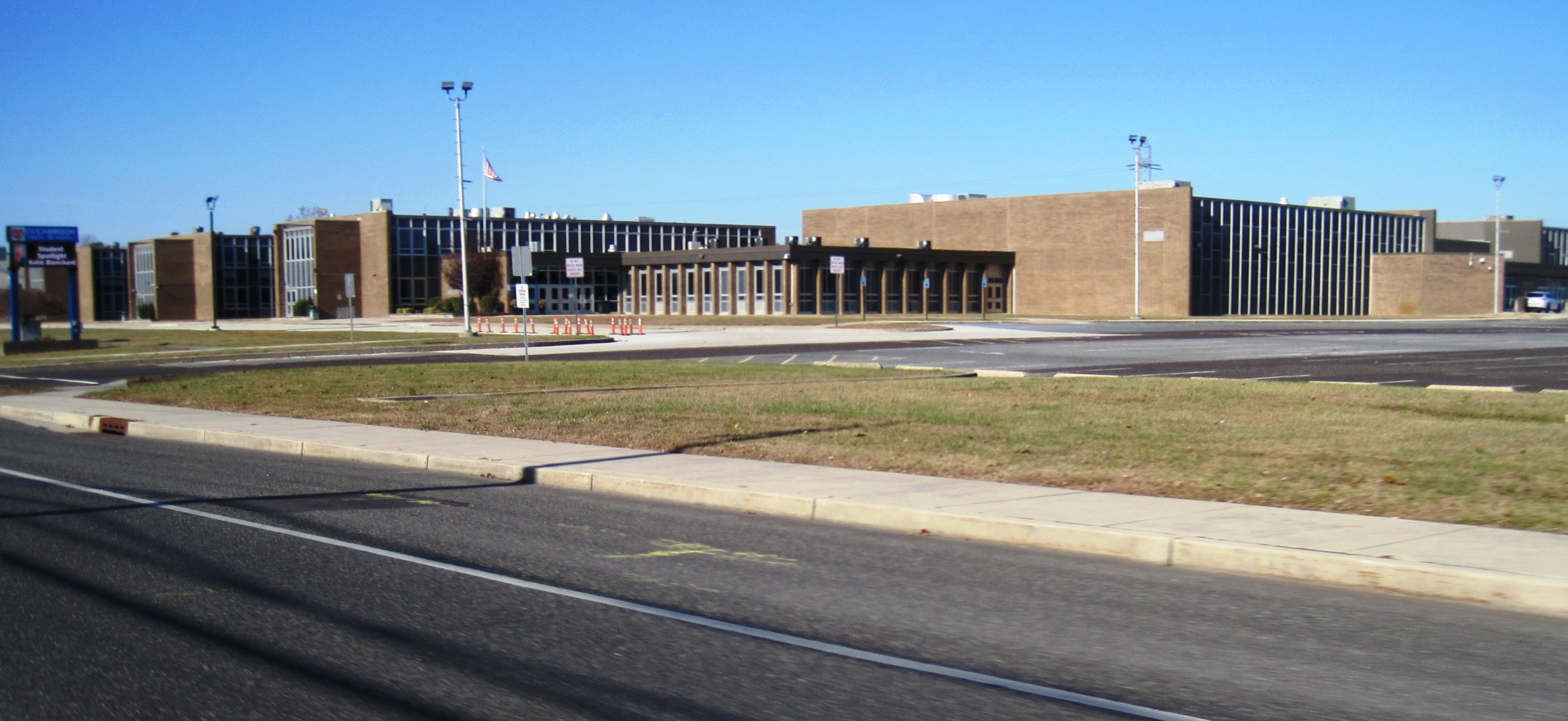

Location
- 1200 Turnersville Road; Pine Hill, Camden County, New Jersey 08021; United States; 39.7777°N 74.9661°W

Information
- Type: Public high school
- School district: Pine Hill Schools
- NCES School ID: 341299000432
- Principal: John Carullo
- Faculty: 64.9 FTEs
- Grades: 9-12
- Enrollment: 860 (as of 2024–25)
- Student to teacher ratio: 13.3:1
- Colors: Orange and Blue
- Athletics conference: Tri-County Conference (general); West Jersey Football League (football)
- Team name: Rams
- Rival: Lindenwold High School
- Website: ohs.pinehillschools.org

Overbrook High School is a comprehensive community four-year public high school serving students in ninth through twelfth grades from Pine Hill, in Camden County, in the U.S. state of New Jersey, operating as the lone secondary school of the Pine Hill Schools. The high school also serves the communities of Berlin Township and Clementon through sending/receiving relationships with their respective school districts. School colors are orange and blue.

As of the 2024–25 school year, the school had an enrollment of 860 students and 64.9 classroom teachers (on an FTE basis), for a student–teacher ratio of 13.3:1. There were 494 students (57.4% of enrollment) eligible for free lunch and 100 (11.6% of students) eligible for reduced-cost lunch.

== History ==
The school opened as Lower Camden County Regional High School in October 1939 in Lindenwold with an enrollment of 700 students, having been constructed at a cost of $575,000 (equivalent to $13.3 million in 2025). It served students from up to ten municipalities at one point. The population soon began to grow, however, and Edgewood Regional High School (now Winslow Township High School) was founded in Winslow Township. The school took the name Overbrook Regional Senior High School in the 1950s, and joined its sister school Edgewood as part of the Lower Camden County Regional School District.

Soon, the student population became too large for the now 60+ year old building to handle, and the current building was erected in 1969 in Pine Hill. The former building became known as Overbrook Regional Junior High School.

Overcrowding again became an issue in the late 90s, as Overbrook Junior High School was serving Berlin Township, Clementon, Lindenwold, Pine Hill, and portions of Winslow Township.

In 1999, each of the individual school boards voted to dissolve LCCRHSD. Lindenwold would build its own high school and take over the old junior high building to make it the district's middle school. Edgewood Regional Junior High became Winslow Township Middle School, and Edgewood Senior High became Winslow Township High School. Pine Hill would build Pine Hill Middle School in the forested area next to the school.

Over the next decade, the population at Overbrook slowly faded from a high of over 1700 students to a new low of just under 800 students.

After 28 years at Overbrook, Paul J. Harmelin retired as principal following the 2012–13 school year. His replacement starting in the 2013–14 school year was Don Borden. Adam Lee was hired as the Principal in July 2015. Lee was a social studies teacher and then an Assistant Principal before being named the Principal.

== Awards, recognition and rankings ==
The school was the 282nd-ranked public high school in New Jersey out of 339 schools statewide in New Jersey Monthly magazine's September 2014 cover story on the state's "Top Public High Schools", using a new ranking methodology. The school had been ranked 253rd in the state of 328 schools in 2012, after being ranked 300th in 2010 out of 322 schools listed. The magazine ranked the school 276th in 2008 out of 316 schools. The school was ranked 278th in the magazine's September 2006 issue, which surveyed 316 schools across the state. The school was later ranked 237th in the magazine's 2016 issue out of 337.

== Athletics ==
The Overbrook High School Rams compete as one of the member schools in the Tri-County Conference, which is comprised of public and private high schools located in Camden, Cape May, Cumberland, Gloucester and Salem counties. The conference is overseen by the New Jersey State Interscholastic Athletic Association (NJSIAA). From 2008 to 2020, the school had been a member of the Colonial Conference. With 471 students in grades 10–12, the school was classified by the NJSIAA for the 2019–20 school year as Group I for most athletic competition purposes, which included schools with an enrollment of 75 to 476 students in that grade range. The football team competes in the Colonial Division of the 94-team West Jersey Football League superconference and was classified by the NJSIAA as Group II South for football for 2024–2026, which included schools with 514 to 685 students.

The school offers fall, winter, and spring season sports. For fall, the school offers boys'/girls' cross country, girls' tennis, boys'/girls' soccer, girls' cheerleading, girls' field hockey and boys' football. Winter sports are boys'/girls' basketball, boys'/girls' bowling, girls' dance, boys'/girls' indoor track, and boys' wrestling. For spring, there are boys'/girls' track, girls' softball, boys'/girls' golf, boys' tennis and boys' baseball. In the 2017–2018 school year, Overbrook High School introduced a program called Unified Sports which is offered in all three seasons.

The boys cross country running team won the Group II state championship in 1966-1968 and the Group III title in 1972.

The boys' soccer team won the Group III state title in 1977 as co-champion with Summit High School.

The boys' wrestling team won the South Jersey Group III sectional championship in 1980 and 1981. Overbrook has had four state wrestling champions in the school's history: Erik Saunders (who won in 1989 in the 135 lb. weight class), Damien Covington (1991 at 189 lb.), Kip Covington (1992 at 145 lb.) and Mark Peiffer (2005 at 171 lbs.). In 2020, Alexis Rosano (143 lb.) became Overbrook's first ever female wrestling state champion.

The football team won the South Jersey Group III title in 1990 and the South Jersey Group IV title in 1998. The 1990 team won the South Jersey Group III state sectional title with a 22–19 win against Brick Memorial High School in the championship game. The Rams were undefeated 1998, winning the NJSIAA South Jersey Group IV title, defeating Shawnee High School by a score of 21–14 in a game played at Rutgers Stadium and ending the season with a perfect 12–0 record. The win marked the program's first state sectional title since they won in Group III in 1990.

In September 2006, Overbrook High School's varsity football field was renamed as the Larry Mauriello Varsity Football Complex.

Overbrook and crosstown rival Lindenwold High School play a traditional Thanksgiving Day football game each year.

In December 2016, before the finals of the Overbrook Wrestling Holiday Christmas Tournament, the Overbrook High School Athletics Department dedicated to name their first ever wrestling room after respected and former wrestling coach Paul Mauriello, in his honor, naming it the "Coach Paul E. Mauriello Wrestling Room".

== Extracurricular activities ==
The clubs offered at Overbrook are African American Culture Club, Multicultural Club, Book Club, Band (including Concert Band, Lab Jazz Band, Jazz Band, and Marching Band) Choir (including Coding Club, Concert Choir, Chambers Singers, Overtones Honors Choir and After-School Choir), Stage Crew, Sports (see above), Academic Challenge, Interact Club, Leo Club, National Honor Society, Science League, Student Government, Yearbook Committee, and Model United Nations (MUN).

== Performing arts ==
The Performing Arts at Overbrook High School is a program consisting of band, choir and theatre. All 3 programs combined make up about 1/3 of the entire school's population. Some recent achievements include...

- The Overbrook Jazz Band has won the NJIAJE state championship in 1988, 1991, 1992, 1994, 1996, 1997, 1999, and 2004.
- The Overbrook Jazz Band has been accepted into the NJIAJE State Finals for nearly all of the past 24 years.
- The Overbrook Jazz Band won their division in the Berklee College of Music High School Jazz Festival in 1996, 1999, 2004, 2005, 2008 and was one of the top high school jazz bands nationally in 1996.
- The Overbrook Marching Band Percussion Group Won the Tri-State Title of Best Percussion in the season 2004–05 with a score of 19.4/20.0, and won the State Best Percussion Title October 28, 2006 with a score of 19.4/20.0
- The Overbrook Marching Band Percussion Group and Color Guard won the Tri-State title of Best Percussion and Best Color Guard in the season of 2013–2014.
- The Overbrook Marching Band Percussion Group also achieved an undefeated season for the season of 2013–2014.
- The Overbrook Overtones Honors Choir performed the National Anthem at a Philadelphia Phillies game in June 2011, 2013, and 2019.
- The Overbrook Overtones Honors Choir placed third in the B101 Christmas Choir Contest in December 2011.
- The Overbrook Overtones Honors Choir was invited to and performed at the Kimmel Center with Christopher B. Thomas and Rowan University's Concert Choir in 2012.
- For the years 2010–2019, the Overbrook Choir has had at least 15 students audition and several participate in the NJ All-State Choir.

Recent Fall plays include You Can't Take It with You (2009), Murder's in the Heir (2010), Noises Off! (2011), Romeo and Juliet (2012), and A Midsummer Night's Dream (2013), 12 Angry Jurors (2014), It's a Wonderful Life (2015), A Christmas Carol (2016), Getting Sara Married (2017), The Crucible (2018), Almost, Maine (2019), Play On (2021), and Elephant's Graveyard (2022).

Recent Spring musicals include Little Shop of Horrors (2007), Guys and Dolls (2008), The Pirates of Penzance (2009), Once on This Island (2010), Les Misérables (2011), Pippin (2012), Beauty and the Beast (2013), How to Succeed in Business Without Really Trying (2014), The Addams Family (2015), Into the Woods (2016), Seussical (2017), Once Upon a Mattress (2018), The Wedding Singer (2019), Sister Act (2020 - canceled for COVID shutdown), Working (2021), Footloose (2022), and Annie (2023).

The Performing Arts Program has helped Overbrook to become a "Choice School" for the Performing Arts for the 2013–14 school year.

== Administration ==
The school's principal is John Carullo. His administration team includes two assistant principals, head of guidance and athletic director.

== Notable alumni ==
- Damien Covington (1972–2002), linebacker who played for three seasons for the Buffalo Bills.
- Ron Dayne (born 1978; class of 1996), Division I all-time rushing yards leader (6,397) and 1999 Heisman Trophy winner, who played in the NFL for the New York Giants, Denver Broncos and Houston Texans as a running back.
- LaMarr Greer (born 1976) former professional basketball player who transferred from Overbrook after his sophomore year.
- Jermaine Jones (born 1986), who competed on the eleventh season of American Idol.
- Tim Lenahan (born 1959, class of 1977), retired head men's soccer coach at Northwestern University and member of the South Jersey Soccer Hall of Fame.
- Eric Lewis (born 1973), jazz piano player, who has worked with artists including Wynton Marsalis.
