= Berlin Township, New Jersey =

Township in Camden County, New Jersey, US

- Township
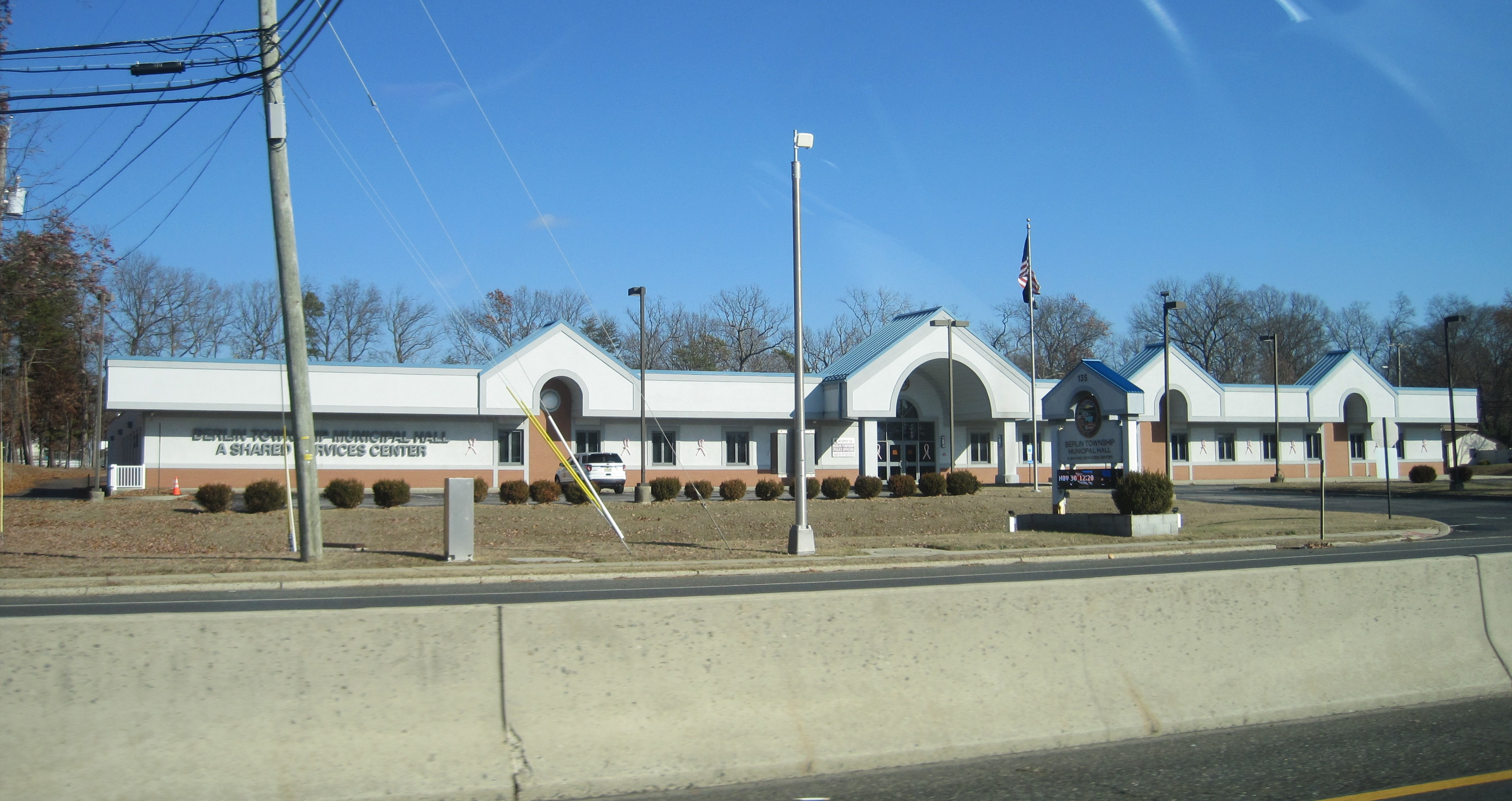
- Berlin Township Municipal Hall

- Seal

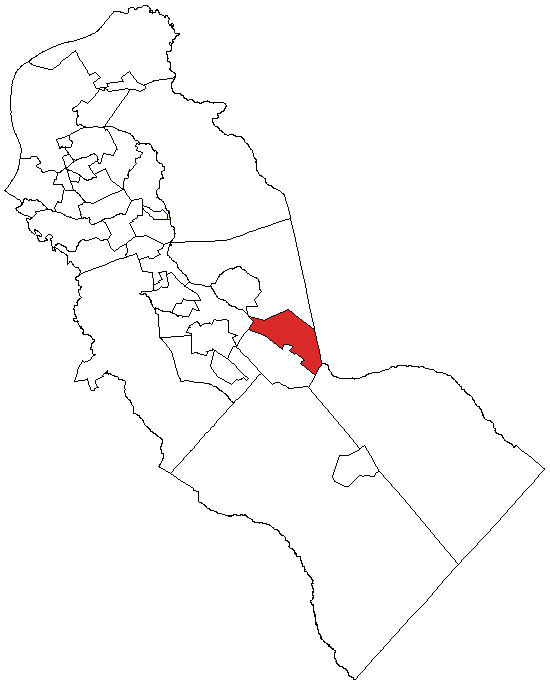
- Location of Berlin Township in Camden County highlighted in red

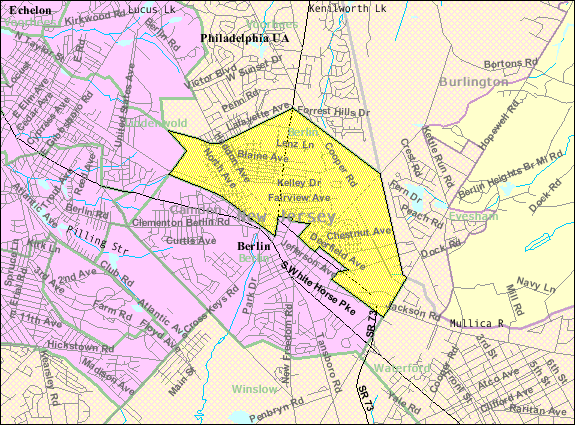
- Census Bureau map of Berlin Township, New Jersey

- Location in Camden County Location in New Jersey Location in the United States
- Coordinates: 39.807116°N 74.924178°W
- Country: United States
- State: New Jersey
- County: Camden
- Incorporated: April 11, 1910
- Named for: Berlin, Germany

Government
  - Type: Faulkner Act (small municipality)
  - Body: Township Council
  - Mayor: Phyllis A. Magazzu (D, term ends December 31, 2029)
  - Municipal clerk: Catherine Underwood

Area
  - Total: 3.35 sq mi (8.67 km^{2})
  - Land: 3.34 sq mi (8.66 km^{2})
  - Water: 0.0077 sq mi (0.02 km^{2}) 0.18%
  - Rank: 320th of 565 in state 11th of 37 in county
- Elevation: 167 ft (51 m)

Population (2020)
  - Total: 5,867
  - Estimate (2023): 5,972
  - Rank: 355th of 565 in state 21st of 37 in county
  - Density: 1,755.5/sq mi (677.8/km^{2})
  - Rank: 313th of 565 in state 31st of 37 in county
- Time zone: UTC−05:00 (Eastern (EST))
  - Summer (DST): UTC−04:00 (Eastern (EDT))
- ZIP Code: 08091
- Area code: 856
- FIPS code: 3400705470
- GNIS feature ID: 0882152
- Website: www.berlintwp.com

Berlin Township is a township in Camden County, in the U.S. state of New Jersey. As of the 2020 United States census, the township's population was 5,867, an increase of 510 (+9.5%) from the 2010 census count of 5,357, which in turn reflected an increase of 67 (+1.3%) from the 5,290 counted in the 2000 census.

== History ==
Berlin was incorporated as a township on April 11, 1910, from portions of Waterford Township. Portions of the township were taken on March 29, 1927, to form Berlin Borough, based on the results of a referendum held on April 26, 1927. The township was named for the city of Berlin, Germany.

After a majority of residents supported the change, the township voted to assign all Berlin Township residents the common ZIP code of 08091 for West Berlin starting in February 1995, ending a system in which some township residents had been served by post offices in Atco and Berlin.

== Geography ==
According to the United States Census Bureau, the township had a total area of 3.35 square miles (8.67 km^{2}), including 3.34 square miles (8.66 km^{2}) of land and 0.01 square miles (0.02 km^{2}) of water (0.18%).

The township borders the municipalities of Berlin Borough, Lindenwold, Voorhees Township, and Waterford Township in Camden County; and Evesham Township in Burlington County.

Crow Foot, Reed Crossing and West Berlin are unincorporated communities located within the township.

The township is one of 56 South Jersey municipalities that are included within the New Jersey Pinelands National Reserve, a protected natural area of unique ecology covering 1,100,000 acres (450,000 ha), that has been classified as a United States Biosphere Reserve and established by Congress in 1978 as the nation's first National Reserve. Part of the borough is included in the state-designated Pinelands Area, which includes portions of Camden County, along with areas in Atlantic, Burlington, Cape May, Cumberland, Gloucester and Ocean counties.

== Demographics ==
Historical population
Census	Pop.	Note	%±
1910	1,611		—
1920	2,093		29.9%
1930	1,537	*	−26.6%
1940	1,771		15.2%
1950	2,013		13.7%
1960	3,363		67.1%
1970	5,692		69.3%
1980	5,348		−6.0%
1990	5,466		2.2%
2000	5,290		−3.2%
2010	5,357		1.3%
2020	5,867		9.5%
2023 (est.)	5,972		1.8%
Population sources: 1910–2000; 1910–1920 1910 1910–1930; 1940–2000 2000; 2010 2020 * = Lost territory in previous decade.

=== 2010 census ===
The 2010 United States census counted 5,357 people, 1,975 households, and 1,363 families in the township. The population density was 1,657.5 per square mile (640.0/km^{2}). There were 2,069 housing units at an average density of 640.2 per square mile (247.2/km^{2}). The racial makeup was 77.19% (4,135) White, 11.57% (620) Black or African American, 0.19% (10) Native American, 5.13% (275) Asian, 0.00% (0) Pacific Islander, 3.79% (203) from other races, and 2.13% (114) from two or more races. Hispanic or Latino of any race were 8.29% (444) of the population.

Of the 1,975 households, 28.6% had children under the age of 18; 50.3% were married couples living together; 12.7% had a female householder with no husband present and 31.0% were non-families. Of all households, 25.1% were made up of individuals and 10.9% had someone living alone who was 65 years of age or older. The average household size was 2.71 and the average family size was 3.25.

22.3% of the population were under the age of 18, 9.5% from 18 to 24, 26.4% from 25 to 44, 27.7% from 45 to 64, and 14.1% who were 65 years of age or older. The median age was 39.3 years. For every 100 females, the population had 99.2 males. For every 100 females ages 18 and older there were 97.4 males.

The Census Bureau's 2006–2010 American Community Survey showed that (in 2010 inflation-adjusted dollars) median household income was $61,029 (with a margin of error of +/− $8,347) and the median family income was $70,777 (+/− $6,678). Males had a median income of $50,286 (+/− $4,262) versus $41,250 (+/− $8,550) for females. The per capita income for the borough was $26,184 (+/− $2,541). About 4.6% of families and 5.6% of the population were below the poverty line, including 8.0% of those under age 18 and 1.3% of those age 65 or over.

=== 2000 census 2000 ===
As of the 2000 United States census there were 5,290 people, 1,893 households, and 1,368 families residing in the township. The population density was 1,628.9 inhabitants per square mile (628.9/km^{2}). There were 2,009 housing units at an average density of 618.6 per square mile (238.8/km^{2}). The racial makeup of the township was 82.46% White, 11.87% African American, 0.17% Native American, 2.70% Asian, 0.08% Pacific Islander, 1.21% from other races, and 1.51% from two or more races. Hispanic or Latino of any race were 4.80% of the population.

There were 1,893 households, out of which 34.5% had children under the age of 18 living with them, 55.1% were married couples living together, 12.3% had a female householder with no husband present, and 27.7% were non-families. 22.6% of all households were made up of individuals, and 11.0% had someone living alone who was 65 years of age or older. The average household size was 2.78 and the average family size was 3.28.

In the township the population was spread out, with 25.8% under the age of 18, 8.5% from 18 to 24, 30.3% from 25 to 44, 22.9% from 45 to 64, and 12.5% who were 65 years of age or older. The median age was 36 years. For every 100 females, there were 99.0 males. For every 100 females age 18 and over, there were 95.3 males.

The median income for a household in the township was $54,448, and the median income for a family was $61,042. Males had a median income of $37,240 versus $28,703 for females. The per capita income for the township was $22,178. About 4.8% of families and 5.9% of the population were below the poverty line, including 5.6% of those under age 18 and 6.7% of those age 65 or over.

== Government ==
=== Local government ===
In 1973, Berlin Township changed its form of government from the Township form to a Faulkner Act Small Municipality form, and now operates under plan 3 of the Small Municipality form, as implemented on January 1, 1988, by direct petition. The township is one of 18 municipalities (of the 564) statewide that use this form of government, which is available only to municipalities with fewer than 12,000 residents at the time of adoption. The governing body is comprised of four Council members and the Mayor, all elected at-large. The mayor serves a four-year term of office and the councilmembers serve a three-year term, with two council seats coming up for election each year for two years and no council seats up for vote in the third year of the cycle. The candidates run in partisan elections at regular primary and are elected at the November general election. Independent candidates, having declared their intentions at primary time, run only in the general election.

This type of government is a strong mayor form in which the Mayor, as chief executive, is responsible for all administrative functions. The Mayor presides at Council meetings, voting and participating as a member of Council. The Mayor appoints, with Council's approval, the following: Tax Assessor, Tax Collector, Clerk, Treasurer, Zoning Officer, Construction Official, Court Administrator, Attorney and Engineer. The Mayor is responsible for the budget; enforcing the charter (State law) and all ordinances (local laws), and the preparation of an annual report for the Council and residents. The Council has legislative and policy-making power. It elects a Council President annually to preside in the Mayor's absence. The Mayor appoints Council members to serve as liaisons to the Recreation Committee, Finance Committee, Athletic Association, Public Works, Special Events, School Board, Public Safety and Senior Citizens. The Mayor and one council member are members of the Planning and Zoning Board.

As of 2026, the Mayor of Berlin Township is Democrat Phyllis A. Jeffries Magazzu, whose term of office ends December 31, 2029. Members of the Township Council are Frank Epifanio (D, 2027), Francis A. McHenry (D, 2028), Kimberly E. Reed (R, 2028) and Mark Reid (D, 2027).

In February 2022, the Township Council selected Francis McHenry from a list of three candidates nominated by the Democratic municipal committee to fill the seat expiring in December 2022 that had been held by Christopher Morris until he resigned from office earlier that month.

=== Federal, state and county representation ===
Berlin Township is located in the 1st Congressional District and is part of New Jersey's 6th state legislative district.

For the 119th United States Congress, New Jersey's 1st congressional district is represented by Donald Norcross (D, Camden). New Jersey is represented in the United States Senate by Democrats Cory Booker (Newark, term ends 2027) and Andy Kim (Moorestown, term ends 2031).

For the 2026–2027 session, the 6th legislative district of the New Jersey Legislature is represented in the State Senate by James Beach (D, Voorhees Township) and in the General Assembly by Louis Greenwald (D, Voorhees Township) and Melinda Kane (D, Cherry Hill).

Camden County is governed by a Board of County Commissioners composed of seven members chosen at-large in partisan elections for three-year terms on a staggered basis by the residents of the county, with either two or three seats up for election each year as part of the November general election. At a reorganization meeting held in January after each election, the newly constituted Board of Commissioners selects one member to serve as Director and another as Deputy Director, each serving a one-year term in that role. As of 2025, Camden County's Commissioners are: Commissioner Director Louis Cappelli Jr. (D, Collingswood, 2026), Commissioner Deputy Director Edward T. McDonnell (D, Pennsauken Township, 2025), Virginia Ruiz Betteridge (D, Runnemede, 2025), Almar Dyer (D, Pennsauken Township, 2027), Melinda Kane (D, Cherry Hill, 2027), Jeffrey L. Nash (D, Winslow Township, 2027), and Jonathan L. Young Sr. (D, Berlin Township, 2026).

Camden County's constitutional officers are: Clerk Pamela Rosen Lampitt (D, Cherry Hill, 2029) Sheriff Chuck Billingham (D, Gloucester City, 2027) and Surrogate Michelle Gentek-Mayer (D, Gloucester Township, 2025).

=== Politics ===
As of March 2011, there were a total of 3,449 registered voters in Berlin Township, of which 1,552 (45.0% vs. 31.7% countywide) were registered as Democrats, 370 (10.7% vs. 21.1%) were registered as Republicans and 1,524 (44.2% vs. 47.1%) were registered as Unaffiliated. There were 3 voters registered as Libertarians or Greens. Among the township's 2010 Census population, 64.4% (vs. 57.1% in Camden County) were registered to vote, including 82.9% of those ages 18 and over (vs. 73.7% countywide).

Gubernatorial election results for Berlin Township
Year	Republican		Democratic		Third party(ies)	
Year	No.	%	No.	%	No.	%
2025	1,146	44.09%	1,435	55.21%	18	0.69%
2021	889	45.52%	1,045	53.51%	19	0.97%
2017	495	38.08%	760	58.46%	45	3.46%
2013	848	64.54%	454	34.55%	12	0.91%
2009	650	40.40%	857	53.26%	102	6.34%
2005	474	36.92%	738	57.48%	72	5.61%

In the 2012 presidential election, Democrat Barack Obama received 1,502 votes (63.9% vs. 54.8% countywide), ahead of Republican Mitt Romney with 814 votes (34.6% vs. 43.5%) and other candidates with 19 votes (0.8% vs. 0.9%), among the 2,351 ballots cast by the township's 3,686 registered voters, for a turnout of 63.8% (vs. 70.4% in Camden County). In the 2008 presidential election, Democrat Barack Obama received 1,519 votes (62.4% vs. 66.2% countywide), ahead of Republican John McCain with 829 votes (34.1% vs. 30.7%) and other candidates with 32 votes (1.3% vs. 1.1%), among the 2,434 ballots cast by the township's 3,478 registered voters, for a turnout of 70.0% (vs. 71.4% in Camden County). In the 2004 presidential election, Democrat John Kerry received 1,305 votes (56.6% vs. 61.7% countywide), ahead of Republican George W. Bush with 876 votes (38.0% vs. 36.4%) and other candidates with 23 votes (1.0% vs. 0.8%), among the 2,304 ballots cast by the township's 3,123 registered voters, for a turnout of 73.8% (vs. 71.3% in the whole county).

United States presidential election results for Berlin Township
Year	Republican		Democratic		Third party(ies)	
Year	No.	%	No.	%	No.	%
2024	1,466	48.35%	1,519	50.10%	47	1.55%
2020	1,453	43.83%	1,817	54.81%	45	1.36%
2016	1,101	44.65%	1,295	52.51%	70	2.84%
2012	814	34.86%	1,502	64.33%	19	0.81%
2008	829	34.83%	1,519	63.82%	32	1.34%
2004	876	39.75%	1,305	59.21%	23	1.04%

In the 2013 gubernatorial election, Republican Chris Christie received 60.0% of the vote (848 cast), ahead of Democrat Barbara Buono with 39.2% (554 votes), and other candidates with 0.8% (12 votes), among the 1,515 ballots cast by the township's 3,752 registered voters (101 ballots were spoiled), for a turnout of 40.4%. In the 2009 gubernatorial election, Democrat Jon Corzine received 857 ballots cast (51.0% vs. 53.8% countywide), ahead of Republican Chris Christie with 650 votes (38.7% vs. 38.5%), Independent Chris Daggett with 73 votes (4.3% vs. 4.5%) and other candidates with 29 votes (1.7% vs. 1.1%), among the 1,681 ballots cast by the township's 3,428 registered voters, yielding a 49.0% turnout (vs. 40.8% in the county).

United States Senate election results for Berlin Township1
Year	Republican		Democratic		Third party(ies)	
Year	No.	%	No.	%	No.	%
2024	1,334	45.31%	1,571	53.36%	39	1.32%
2018	888	43.61%	1,041	51.13%	107	5.26%
2012	696	32.06%	1,448	66.70%	27	1.24%
2006	483	38.33%	737	58.49%	40	3.17%

United States Senate election results for Berlin Township2
Year	Republican		Democratic		Third party(ies)	
Year	No.	%	No.	%	No.	%
2020	1,376	42.11%	1,856	56.79%	36	1.10%
2014	419	37.68%	678	60.97%	15	1.35%
2013	282	39.11%	428	59.36%	11	1.53%
2008	753	33.83%	1,447	65.00%	26	1.17%

== Education ==
The Berlin Township Public Schools serve students in pre-kindergarten through eighth grade. As of the 2020–21 school year, the district, comprised of two schools, had an enrollment of 609 students and 55.1 classroom teachers (on an FTE basis), for a student–teacher ratio of 11.1:1. Schools in the district (with 2020–21 enrollment data from the National Center for Education Statistics) are John F. Kennedy Elementary School with 279 students in Pre-K through 3rd grade and Dwight D. Eisenhower Middle School with 325 students in grades 4–8. The Huster Building, formerly used as a kindergarten and now used for administration, is named after Robert R. Huster, a Berlin Township resident who was killed in action on April 8, 1967, during the Vietnam War.

Public school students in ninth through twelfth grades from Berlin Township and Clementon attend Overbrook High School in Pine Hill as part of a sending/receiving relationship with the Pine Hill Schools. A representative from Berlin Township serves on the board of education of the Pine Hill Schools. As of the 2020–21 school year, the high school had an enrollment of 657 students and 61.6 classroom teachers (on an FTE basis), for a student–teacher ratio of 10.7:1.

Students from Berlin Township, and from all of Camden County, are eligible to attend the Camden County Technical Schools, a countywide public school district that serves the vocational and technical education needs of students at the high school and post-secondary level at the Gloucester Township Campus in the Sicklerville section of Gloucester Township or the Pennsauken Campus in Pennsauken Township. Students are accepted based on district admission standards and costs of attendance and transportation are covered by the home district of each student.

== Transportation ==
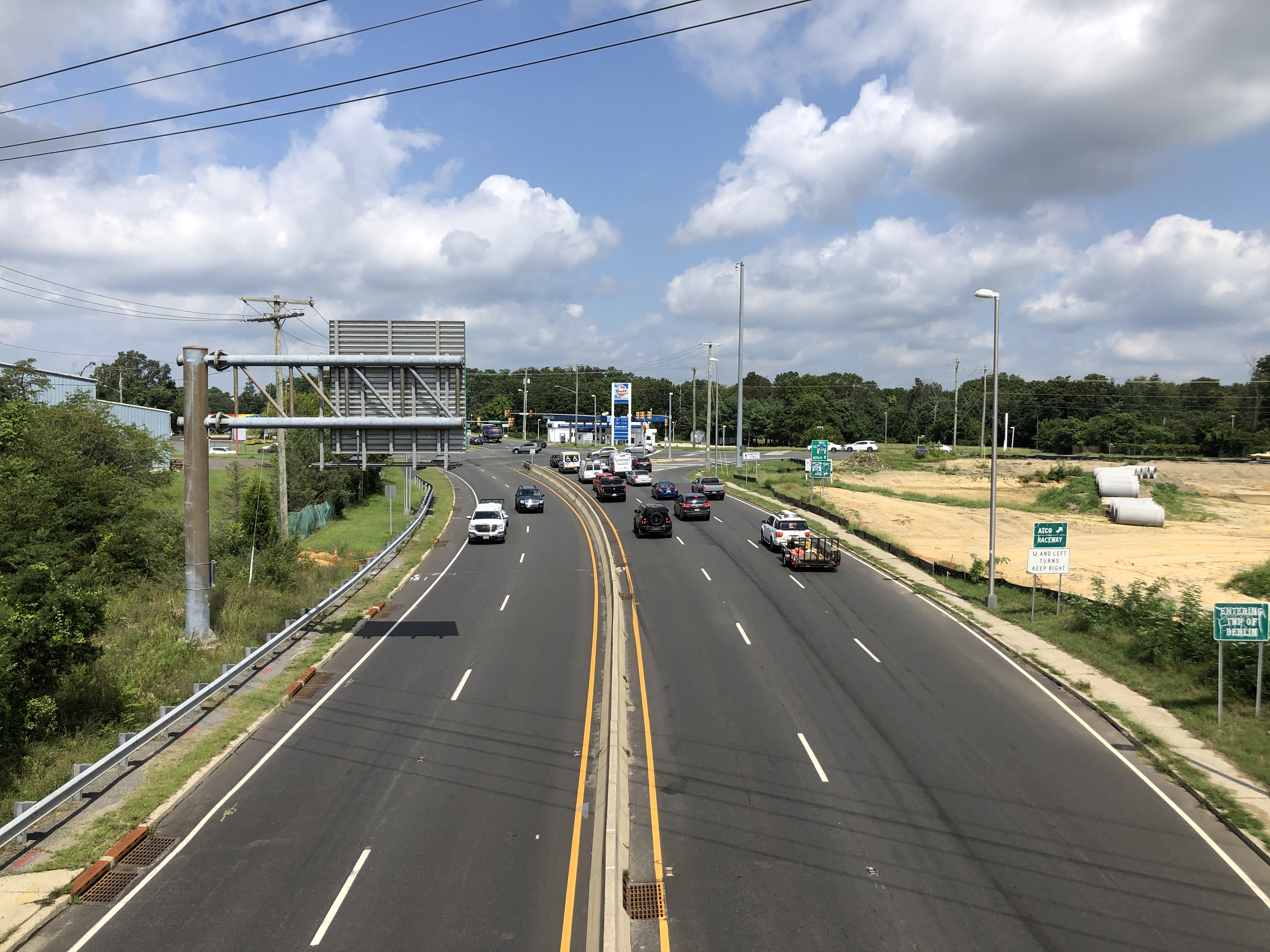
Route 73 northbound in Berlin Township

=== Roads and highways ===
As of May 2010, the township had a total of 36.12 miles (58.13 km) of roadways, of which 27.40 miles (44.10 km) were maintained by the municipality, 6.51 miles (10.48 km) by Camden County and 2.21 miles (3.56 km) by the New Jersey Department of Transportation.

Route 73 is the main highway serving Berlin Township. County Route 534 and County Route 561 also pass through the township. Berlin Township formerly contained the Berlin Circle.

=== Public transportation ===
NJ Transit bus service is available in the borough on the 406 route, which operates between Berlin Township and Philadelphia.

== Notable people ==
People who were born in, residents of, or otherwise closely associated with Berlin Township include:

- Damien Covington (1972–2002), linebacker who played for three seasons in the NFL for the Buffalo Bills
- Sarah Dawson (born 1992), field hockey forward / midfielder who represented the United States at the 2012 Summer Olympics in Beijing
- Ron Dayne (born 1978), running back for the Houston Texans
- Steven Ferrari (born 1962), retired United States Army major general
