= Berlin, New Jersey =

Borough in Camden County, New Jersey, US

- Borough
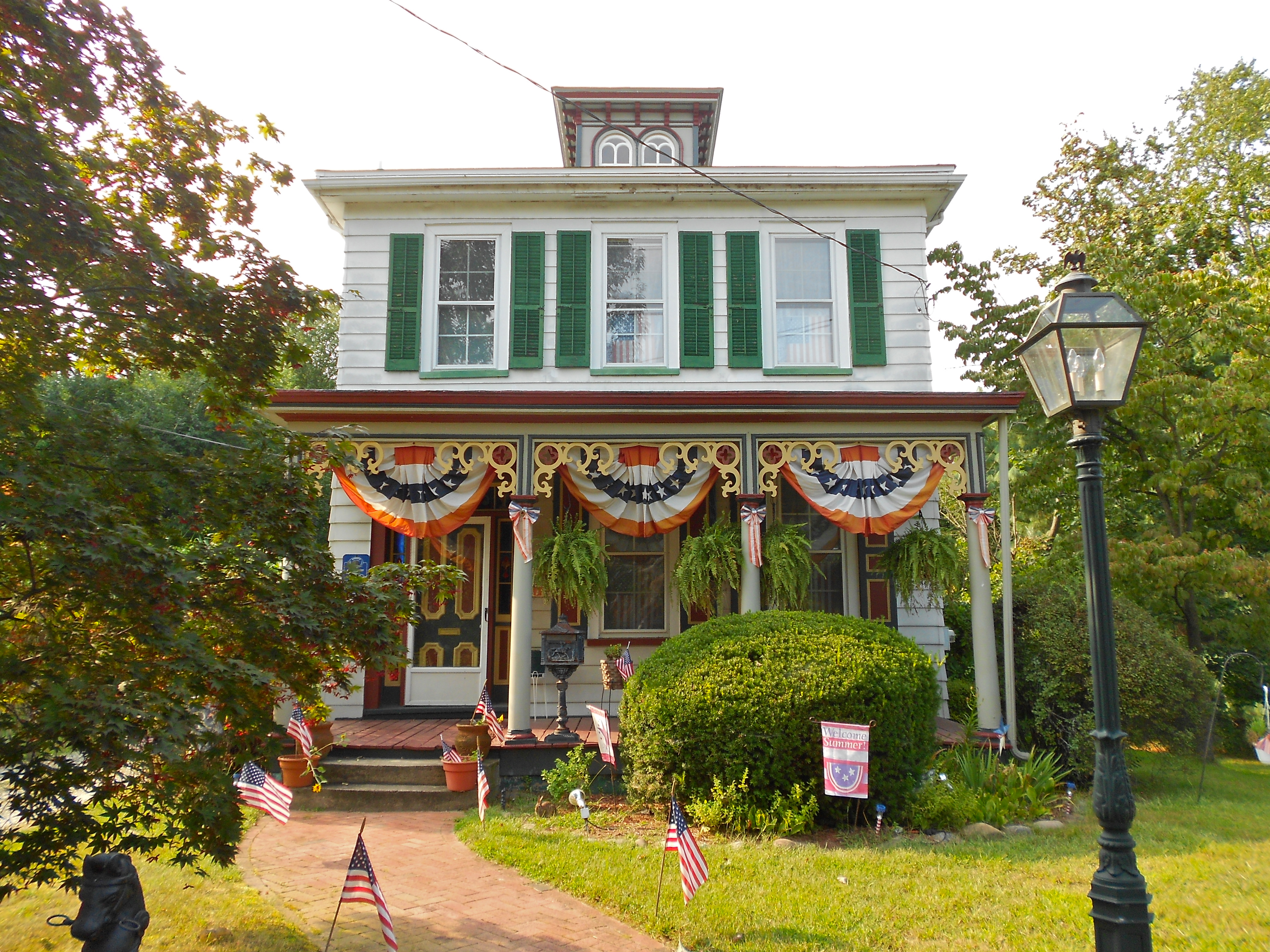
- John Wescott House

- Seal
- Nickname: "Long-A-Coming"
- Location of Berlin in Camden County highlighted in red (right). Inset map: Location of Camden County in New Jersey highlighted in orange (left).

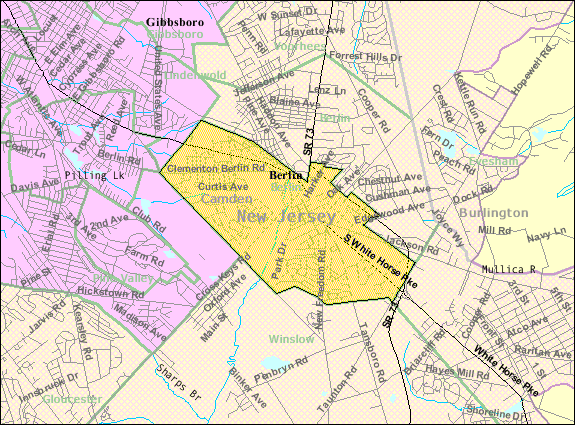
- Census Bureau map of Berlin, New Jersey

- Location in Camden County Location in New Jersey Location in the United States
- Coordinates: 39.792059°N 74.936986°W
- Country: United States
- State: New Jersey
- County: Camden
- Royal charter: June 1, 1695 (as part of Waterford Township)
- Incorporated: April 26, 1927
- Named after: Berlin, Germany

Government
  - Type: Borough
  - Body: Borough Council
  - Mayor: Rick Miller (I, term ends December 31, 2027)
  - Administrator: Anne Marie Miller
  - Municipal clerk: Rachel Von der Tann

Area
  - Total: 3.61 sq mi (9.34 km^{2})
  - Land: 3.59 sq mi (9.31 km^{2})
  - Water: 0.015 sq mi (0.04 km^{2}) 0.39%
  - Rank: 311th of 565 in state 10th of 37 in county
- Elevation: 141 ft (43 m)

Population (2020)
  - Total: 7,489
  - Estimate (2023): 7,534
  - Rank: 307th of 565 in state 18th of 37 in county
  - Density: 2,083.8/sq mi (804.6/km^{2})
  - Rank: 288th of 565 in state 29th of 37 in county
- Time zone: UTC−05:00 (Eastern (EST))
  - Summer (DST): UTC−04:00 (Eastern (EDT))
- ZIP Code: 08009
- Area code: 856
- FIPS code: 3400705440
- GNIS feature ID: 885158
- Website: www.berlinnj.org

Berlin is a borough in Camden County, in the U.S. state of New Jersey. As of the 2020 United States census, the borough's population was 7,489, a decrease of 99 (−1.3%) from the 2010 census count of 7,588, which in turn reflected an increase of 1,439 (+23.4%) from the 6,149 counted in the 2000 census.

Berlin was incorporated as a borough on March 29, 1927, from portions of Berlin Township, based on the results of a referendum held on April 26, 1927.

== History ==
What is now Berlin was known in earlier times as "Longacoming." The Lenape Native Americans used Lonaconing Trail to describe the travel route that ran through the area, connecting the Jersey Shore to the Delaware River. Another tradition cites early European visitors who found a stream at the head of the Great Egg Harbor River and appreciated the respite as being "long a coming".

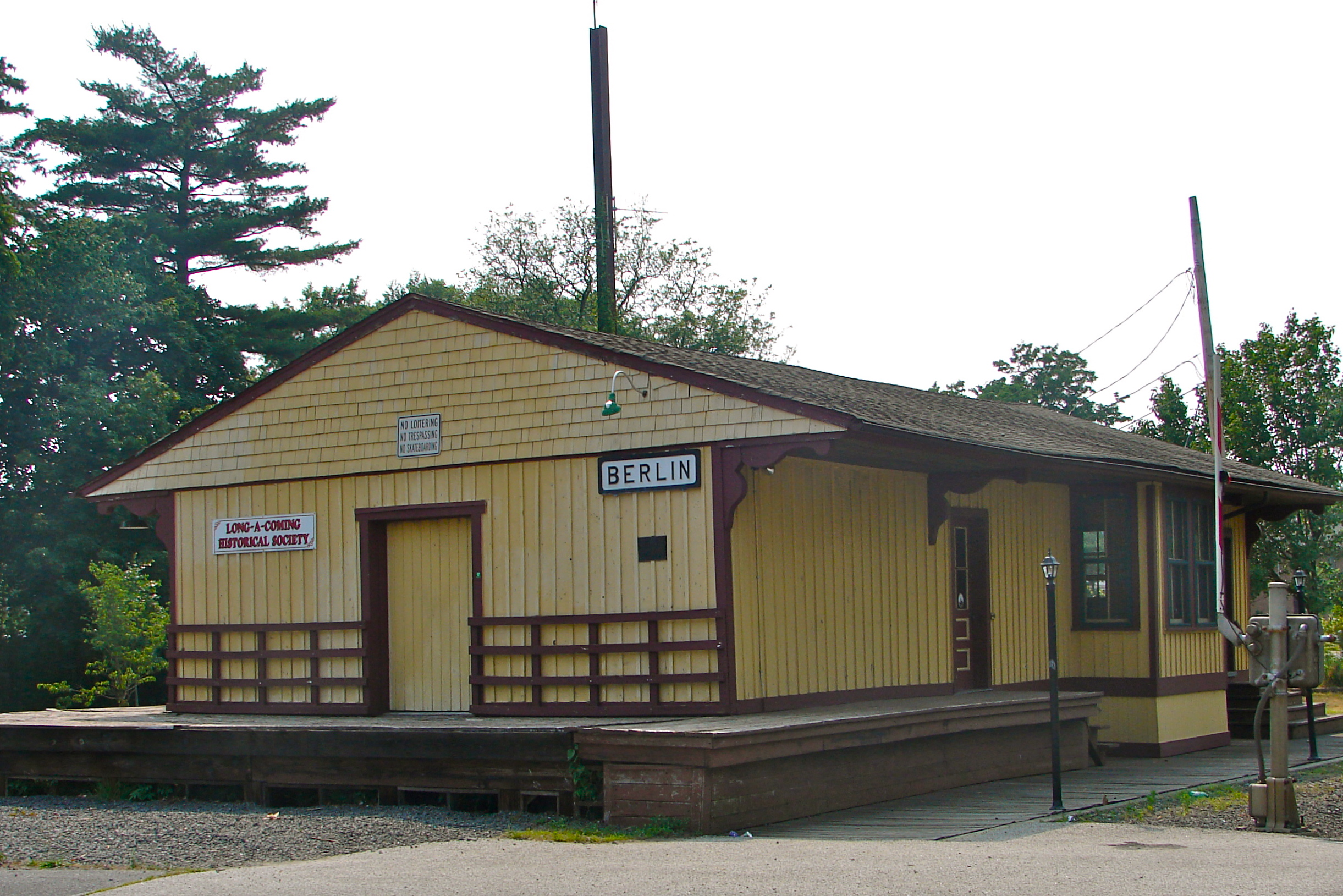
Long-a-Coming Depot, built in 1856 and believed to be the oldest surviving railroad station in New Jersey

Long-a-Coming became a stopping point for stagecoaches located at the halfway point between Philadelphia and Atlantic City. Upon the creation of Camden County in 1844, it was briefly named the county seat (while the area was still a part of Waterford Township), until 1848 when the seat moved to the city of Camden. A rail line was laid in 1853. Three years later, the Long-a-Coming railroad station was built. In February 1867, the station was renamed "Magnolia". This caused confusion because there was a community called Magnolia nearby. Three months later, the station's name changed to Berlin. The name "Berlin" may have been chosen as a reference to the city of Berlin in Germany, though the derivation is uncertain.

== Geography ==
According to the United States Census Bureau, the borough had a total area of 3.61 square miles (9.34 km^{2}), including 3.59 square miles (9.31 km^{2}) of land and 0.01 square miles (0.04 km^{2}) of water (0.39%).

The borough borders the Camden County municipalities of Berlin Township, Clementon, Lindenwold, Pine Hill, Waterford Township and Winslow Township.

The borough is one of 56 South Jersey municipalities that are included within the New Jersey Pinelands National Reserve, a protected natural area of unique ecology covering 1,100,000 acres (450,000 ha), that has been classified as a United States Biosphere Reserve and established by Congress in 1978 as the nation's first National Reserve. Part of the borough is included in the state-designated Pinelands Area, which includes portions of Camden County, along with areas in Atlantic, Burlington, Cape May, Cumberland, Gloucester and Ocean counties.

== Demographics ==
Historical population
Census	Pop.	Note	%±
1930	1,955		—
1940	1,753		−10.3%
1950	2,339		33.4%
1960	3,578		53.0%
1970	4,997		39.7%
1980	5,786		15.8%
1990	5,672		−2.0%
2000	6,149		8.4%
2010	7,588		23.4%
2020	7,489		−1.3%
2023 (est.)	7,534	▲	0.6%
Population sources: 1930–2000 1930; 1940–2000; 2010 2020

=== 2020 census ===
As of the 2020 census, Berlin had a population of 7,489. The median age was 42.9 years. 21.2% of residents were under the age of 18 and 18.1% of residents were 65 years of age or older. For every 100 females there were 91.6 males, and for every 100 females age 18 and over there were 87.2 males age 18 and over.

100.0% of residents lived in urban areas, while 0.0% lived in rural areas.

There were 2,858 households in Berlin, of which 31.6% had children under the age of 18 living in them. Of all households, 52.7% were married-couple households, 13.7% were households with a male householder and no spouse or partner present, and 27.4% were households with a female householder and no spouse or partner present. About 25.5% of all households were made up of individuals and 13.4% had someone living alone who was 65 years of age or older.

There were 2,981 housing units, of which 4.1% were vacant. The homeowner vacancy rate was 0.9% and the rental vacancy rate was 6.8%.

Racial composition as of the 2020 census
Race	Number	Percent
White	6,205	82.9%
Black or African American	365	4.9%
American Indian and Alaska Native	9	0.1%
Asian	265	3.5%
Native Hawaiian and Other Pacific Islander	6	0.1%
Some other race	185	2.5%
Two or more races	454	6.1%
Hispanic or Latino (of any race)	422	5.6%

=== 2010 census ===
The 2010 United States census counted 7,588 people, 2,806 households, and 1,967 families in the borough. The population density was 2,114.9 per square mile (816.6/km^{2}). There were 2,949 housing units at an average density of 821.9 per square mile (317.3/km^{2}). The racial makeup was 90.47% (6,865) White, 4.19% (318) Black or African American, 0.09% (7) Native American, 2.78% (211) Asian, 0.04% (3) Pacific Islander, 0.88% (67) from other races, and 1.54% (117) from two or more races. Hispanic or Latino of any race were 3.12% (237) of the population.

Of the 2,806 households, 30.9% had children under the age of 18; 52.9% were married couples living together; 12.4% had a female householder with no husband present and 29.9% were non-families. Of all households, 25.7% were made up of individuals and 12.7% had someone living alone who was 65 years of age or older. The average household size was 2.65 and the average family size was 3.22.

22.8% of the population were under the age of 18, 8.3% from 18 to 24, 24.6% from 25 to 44, 27.5% from 45 to 64, and 16.9% who were 65 years of age or older. The median age was 41.1 years. For every 100 females, the population had 90.9 males. For every 100 females ages 18 and older there were 86.3 males.

The Census Bureau's 2006–2010 American Community Survey showed that (in 2010 inflation-adjusted dollars) median household income was $65,771 (with a margin of error of +/− $8,475) and the median family income was $79,347 (+/− $13,820). Males had a median income of $53,102 (+/− $7,153) versus $47,292 (+/− $13,458) for females. The per capita income for the borough was $33,672 (+/− $5,917). About 4.4% of families and 6.6% of the population were below the poverty line, including 9.2% of those under age 18 and 3.9% of those age 65 or over.

=== 2000 census ===
As of the 2000 United States census there were 6,149 people, 2,205 households, and 1,660 families residing in the borough. The population density was 1,718.6 inhabitants per square mile (663.6/km^{2}). There were 2,275 housing units at an average density of 635.8 per square mile (245.5/km^{2}). The racial makeup of the borough was 94.06% White, 2.18% African American, 0.21% Native American, 1.69% Asian, 0.07% Pacific Islander, 0.49% from other races, and 1.30% from two or more races. Hispanic or Latino of any race were 2.11% of the population.

There were 2,205 households, out of which 33.6% had children under the age of 18 living with them, 60.3% were married couples living together, 11.4% had a female householder with no husband present, and 24.7% were non-families. 19.6% of all households were made up of individuals, and 7.9% had someone living alone who was 65 years of age or older. The average household size was 2.76 and the average family size was 3.19.

In the borough the population was spread out, with 24.6% under the age of 18, 6.7% from 18 to 24, 30.3% from 25 to 44, 24.7% from 45 to 64, and 13.6% who were 65 years of age or older. The median age was 38 years. For every 100 females, there were 98.1 males. For every 100 females age 18 and over, there were 93.0 males.

The median income for a household in the borough was $60,286, and the median income for a family was $68,704. Males had a median income of $44,211 versus $31,980 for females. The per capita income for the borough was $24,675. About 1.9% of families and 3.5% of the population were below the poverty line, including 2.7% of those under age 18 and 5.7% of those age 65 or over.

== Government ==
=== Local government ===
Berlin is governed under the borough form of New Jersey municipal government, which is used in 218 (of the 565) municipalities statewide, making it the most common form of government in New Jersey. The governing body is comprised of a mayor and a borough council, with all positions elected at-large on a partisan basis as part of the November general election. A mayor is elected directly by the voters to a four-year term of office. The borough council includes six members elected to serve three-year terms on a staggered basis, with two seats coming up for election each year in a three-year cycle. The borough form of government used by Berlin is a "weak mayor / strong council" government in which council members act as the legislative body with the mayor presiding at meetings and voting only in the event of a tie. The mayor can veto ordinances subject to an override by a two-thirds majority vote of the council. The mayor makes committee and liaison assignments for council members, and most appointments are made by the mayor with the advice and consent of the council.

As of 2026, the mayor of Berlin Borough is Independent Rick Miller, whose term of office ends December 31, 2027. Members of the Borough Council are Council President Jacob "Jake" Miller (R, 2024), Leonard Badolato (I, 2026), Patricia Cummings (R, 2024), Keith Hohing (R, 2026), Carlos Mascarenhas (R, 2028) And Millard V. Wilkinson (R, 2028).

In January 2020, the borough council appointed Patricia Cummings to fill the seat expiring in December 2021 that had been held by Ron Rocco until he resigned from office and also appointed Jake Miller to fill the seat expiring in December 2020 that had been held by Rick Miller until he stepped down to take office as a mayor.

In September 2019, Keith Hohing was appointed to serve the term expiring in December 2021 that had been held by Mike Buchanan until he resigned after purchasing a home outside of Berlin Borough.

In May 2019, the borough council selected Andy Simone to fill the seat expiring in December 2019 that had been vacated by Daniel MacDonell until he resigned from office the previous month.

=== Federal, state and county representation ===
Berlin Borough is located in the 1st Congressional District and is part of New Jersey's 8th state legislative district. Prior to the 2011 reapportionment following the 2010 census, Berlin Borough had been in the 6th state legislative district.

For the 119th United States Congress, New Jersey's 1st congressional district is represented by Donald Norcross (D, Camden). New Jersey is represented in the United States Senate by Democrats Cory Booker (Newark, term ends 2027) and Andy Kim (Moorestown, term ends 2031).

For the 2026–2027 session, the 8th legislative district of the New Jersey Legislature is represented in the New Jersey Senate by Latham Tiver (R, Southampton Township) and in the General Assembly by Anthony Angelozzi (D, Hammonton) and Andrea Katz (D, Chesterfield Township).

Camden County is governed by a Board of County Commissioners composed of seven members chosen at-large in partisan elections for three-year terms on a staggered basis by the residents of the county, with either two or three seats up for election each year as part of the November general election. At a reorganization meeting held in January after each election, the newly constituted Board of Commissioners selects one member to serve as Director and another as Deputy Director, each serving a one-year term in that role. As of 2025, Camden County's Commissioners are: Commissioner Director Louis Cappelli Jr. (D, Collingswood, 2026), Commissioner Deputy Director Edward T. McDonnell (D, Pennsauken Township, 2025), Virginia Ruiz Betteridge (D, Runnemede, 2025), Almar Dyer (D, Pennsauken Township, 2027), Melinda Kane (D, Cherry Hill, 2027), Jeffrey L. Nash (D, Winslow Township, 2027), and Jonathan L. Young Sr. (D, Berlin Township, 2026).

Camden County's constitutional officers are: Clerk Pamela Rosen Lampitt (D, Cherry Hill, 2029) Sheriff Chuck Billingham (D, Gloucester City, 2027) and Surrogate Michelle Gentek-Mayer (D, Gloucester Township, 2025).

=== Politics ===
As of March 2011, there were a total of 5,225 registered voters in Berlin, of which 1,731 (33.1% vs. 31.7% countywide) were registered as Democrats, 1,044 (20.0% vs. 21.1%) were registered as Republicans and 2,450 (46.9% vs. 47.1%) were registered as Unaffiliated. There were no voters registered to other parties. Among the borough's 2010 Census population, 68.9% (vs. 57.1% in Camden County) were registered to vote, including 89.2% of those ages 18 and over (vs. 73.7% countywide).

Gubernatorial election results for Berlin
Year	Republican		Democratic		Third party(ies)	
Year	No.	%	No.	%	No.	%
2025	1,599	45.95%	1,855	53.30%	26	0.75%
2021	1,653	56.63%	1,240	42.48%	26	0.89%
2017	935	44.87%	1,052	50.48%	97	4.65%
2013	1,255	65.06%	645	33.44%	29	1.50%
2009	1,261	52.85%	989	41.45%	136	5.70%
2005	1,002	44.97%	1,106	49.64%	120	5.39%

In the 2012 presidential election, Democrat Barack Obama received 1,851 votes (50.9% vs. 54.8% countywide), ahead of Republican Mitt Romney with 1,720 votes (47.3% vs. 43.5%) and other candidates with 44 votes (1.2% vs. 0.9%), among the 3,635 ballots cast by the borough's 5,478 registered voters, for a turnout of 66.4% (vs. 70.4% in Camden County). In the 2008 presidential election, Democrat Barack Obama received 1,993 votes (52.2% vs. 66.2% countywide), ahead of Republican John McCain with 1,724 votes (45.2% vs. 30.7%) and other candidates with 45 votes (1.2% vs. 1.1%), among the 3,817 ballots cast by the borough's 5,281 registered voters, for a turnout of 72.3% (vs. 71.4% in Camden County). In the 2004 presidential election, Democrat John Kerry received 1,842 votes (50.2% vs. 61.7% countywide), ahead of Republican George W. Bush with 1,766 votes (48.2% vs. 36.4%) and other candidates with 38 votes (1.0% vs. 0.8%), among the 3,667 ballots cast by the borough's 4,790 registered voters, for a turnout of 76.6% (vs. 71.3% in the whole county).

United States presidential election results for Berlin
Year	Republican		Democratic		Third party(ies)	
Year	No.	%	No.	%	No.	%
2024	2,354	50.95%	2,191	47.42%	75	1.62%
2020	2,214	48.56%	2,270	49.79%	75	1.65%
2016	1,853	49.87%	1,715	46.15%	148	3.98%
2012	1,720	47.58%	1,851	51.20%	44	1.22%
2008	1,724	45.83%	1,993	52.98%	45	1.20%
2004	1,766	48.44%	1,842	50.52%	38	1.04%

In the 2013 gubernatorial election, Republican Chris Christie received 65.1% of the vote (1,255 cast), ahead of Democrat Barbara Buono with 33.4% (645 votes), and other candidates with 1.5% (29 votes), among the 1,975 ballots cast by the borough's 5,487 registered voters (46 ballots were spoiled), for a turnout of 36.0%. In the 2009 gubernatorial election, Republican Chris Christie received 1,261 votes (52.0% vs. 38.5% countywide), ahead of Democrat Jon Corzine with 989 votes (40.8% vs. 53.8%), Independent Chris Daggett with 120 votes (5.0% vs. 4.5%) and other candidates with 16 votes (0.7% vs. 1.1%), among the 2,423 ballots cast by the borough's 5,126 registered voters, yielding a 47.3% turnout (vs. 40.8% in the county).

United States Senate election results for Berlin1
Year	Republican		Democratic		Third party(ies)	
Year	No.	%	No.	%	No.	%
2024	2,198	48.79%	2,245	49.83%	62	1.38%
2018	1,478	51.73%	1,216	42.56%	163	5.71%
2012	1,585	46.00%	1,815	52.67%	46	1.33%
2006	1,151	48.92%	1,145	48.66%	57	2.42%

United States Senate election results for Berlin2
Year	Republican		Democratic		Third party(ies)	
Year	No.	%	No.	%	No.	%
2020	2,195	49.27%	2,212	49.65%	48	1.08%
2014	1,007	51.56%	903	46.24%	43	2.20%
2013	575	53.39%	481	44.66%	21	1.95%
2008	1,608	45.32%	1,911	53.86%	29	0.82%

== Historic district ==
- Berlin Historic District
- U.S. National Register of Historic Places
- U.S. Historic district
- New Jersey Register of Historic Places
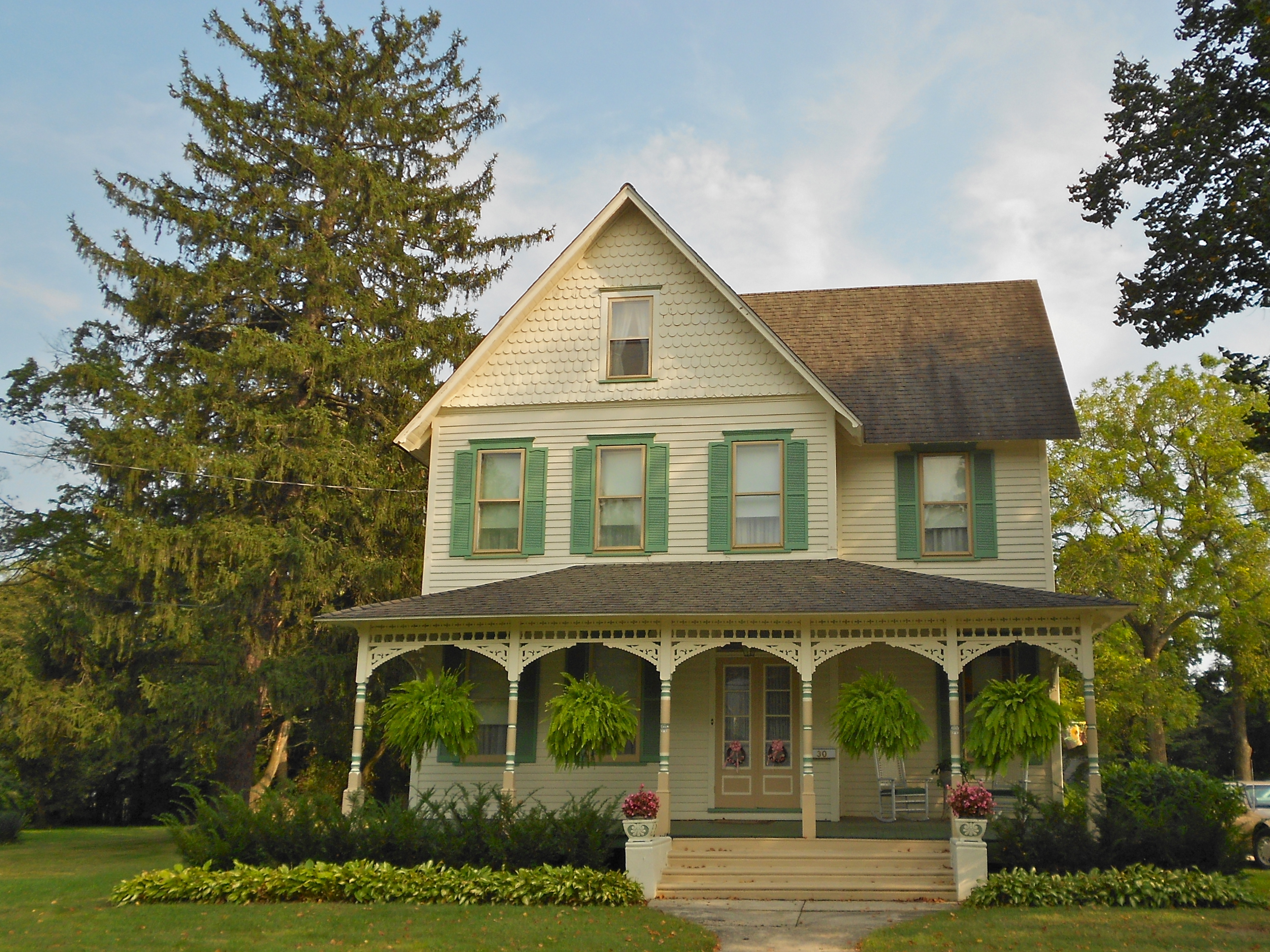
- William C. Raughley House
- Location: Washington, East Taunton, and Haines avenues and parts of South White Horse Pike, Jackson Road, and Jefferson Avenue
- Area: 28 acres (11 ha)
- Architectural style: Italianate, Second Empire, Bungalow/craftsman
- NRHP reference No.: 95000408
- NJRHP No.: 2812

Significant dates
- Added to NRHP: April 14, 1995
- Designated NJRHP: March 3, 1995

The Berlin Historic District is a 28-acre (11 ha) national historic district along Washington, East Taunton, and Haines avenues and parts of South White Horse Pike, Jackson Road, and Jefferson Avenue in the community. It was added to the National Register of Historic Places on April 14, 1995, for its significance in architecture and community development. The district includes 65 contributing buildings.

The Victorian-style John Westcott House on Washington Avenue was built in the 1860s and features a cupola. The Dr. William C. Raughley House was built 1888–1889 with Queen Anne style and is a key contributing property. The Victorian house at 18 Washington Avenue was built in 1865. The Victorian Joseph N. Ross House was built in 1870 and features a scalloped vergeboard and spindlework.

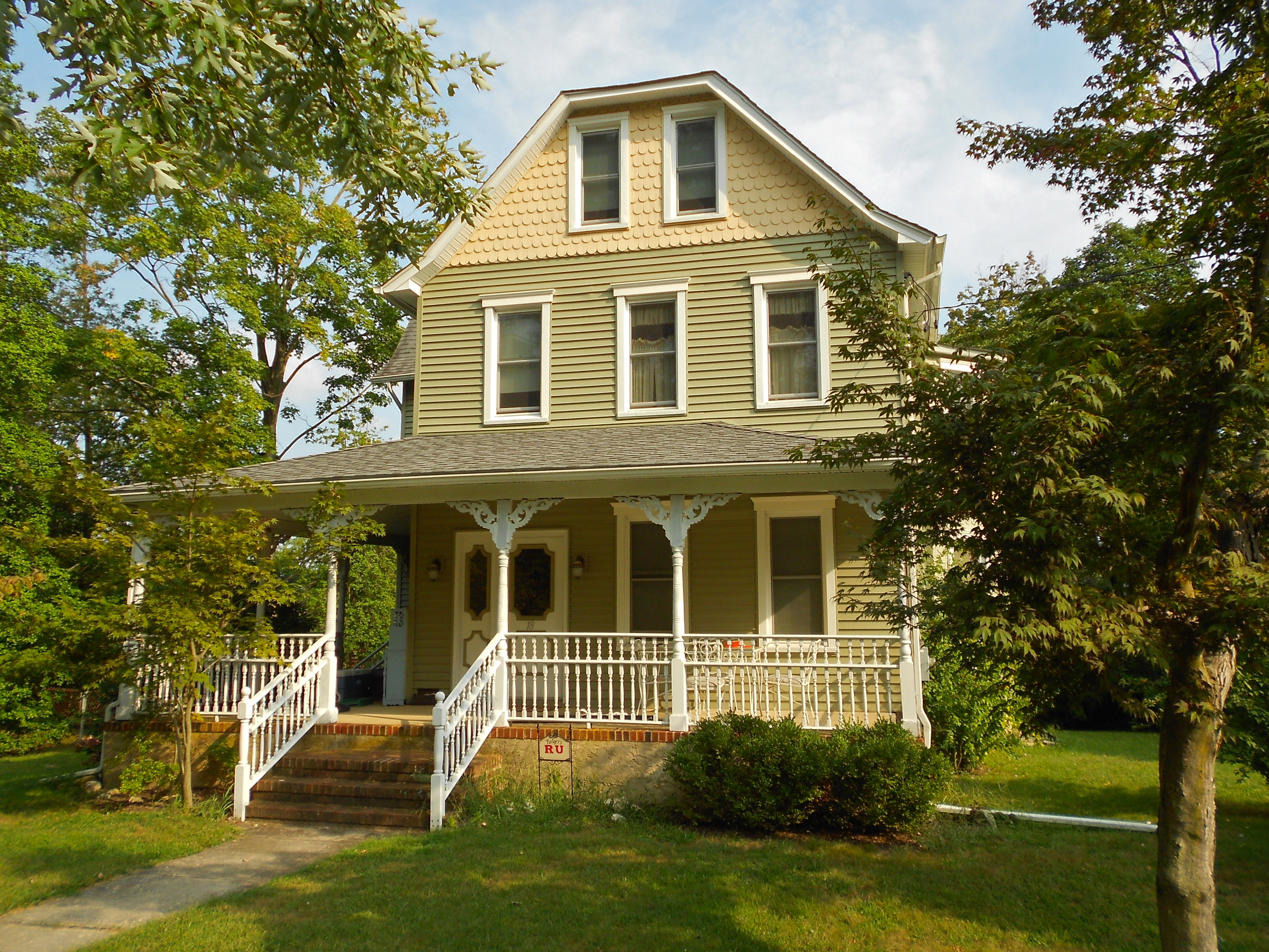
18 Washington Avenue

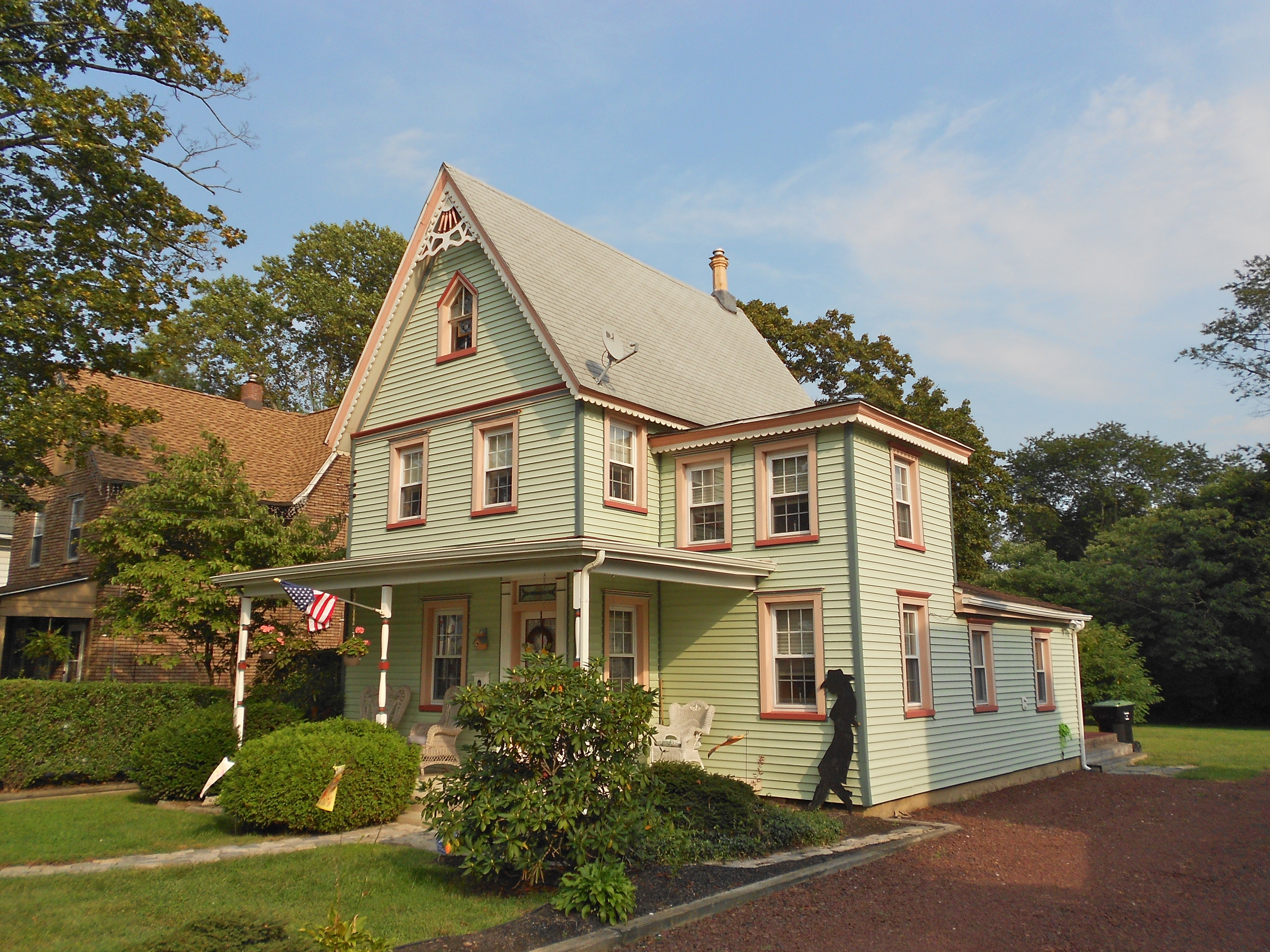
Joseph N. Ross House

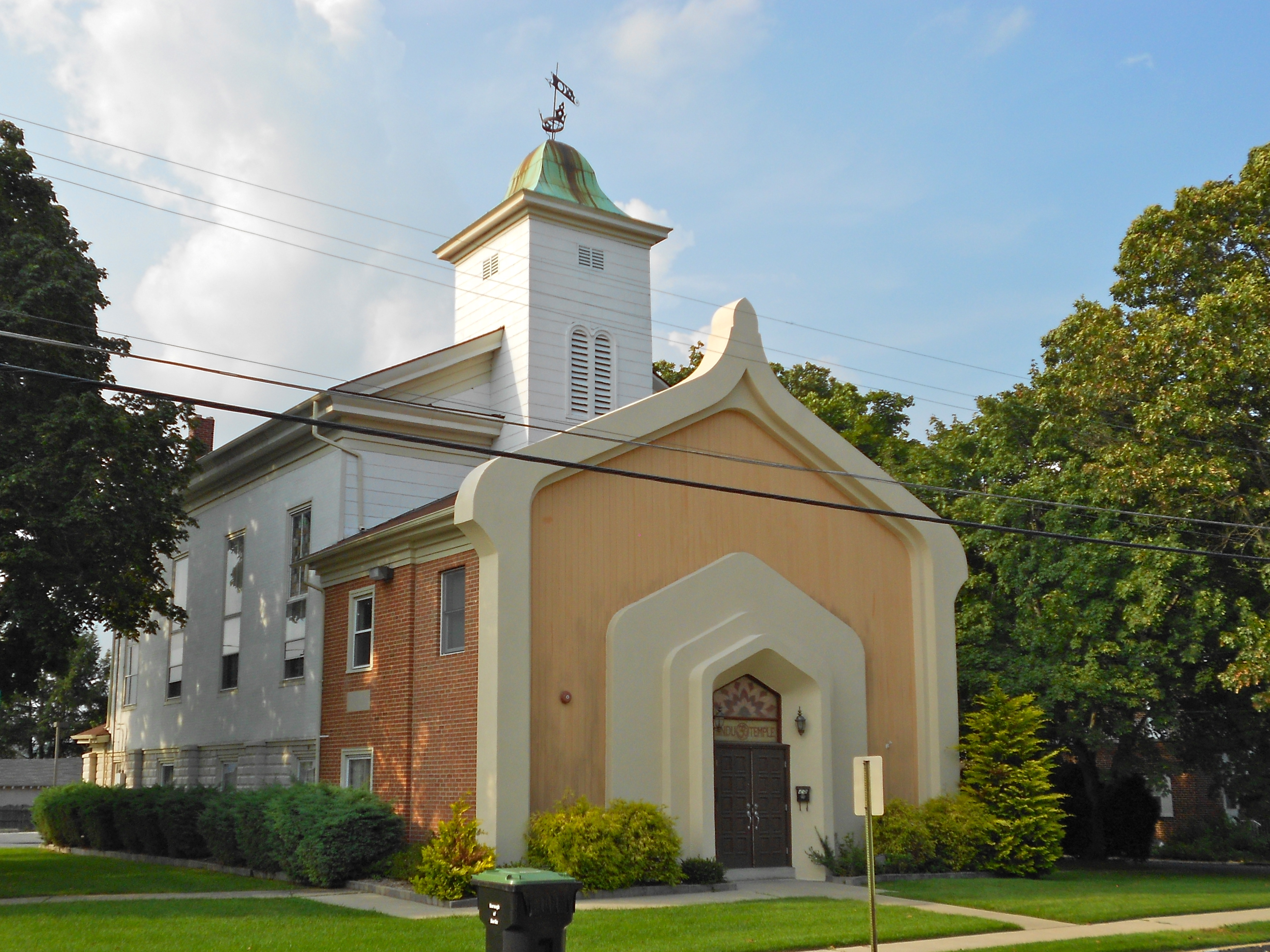
Hindu temple on Taunton Street

== Education ==
The Berlin Borough School District serves public school students in pre-kindergarten through eighth grade at Berlin Community School. As of the 2021–22 school year, the district, comprised of one school, had an enrollment of 802 students and 73.6 classroom teachers (on an FTE basis), for a student–teacher ratio of 10.9:1. Many Community Education and Recreation (CER) programs are held at Berlin Community School, including preschool and after school programs.

Public school students in ninth through twelfth grades attend the Eastern Camden County Regional High School District, a limited-purpose, public regional school district that serves students at Eastern Regional High School from the constituent communities of Berlin Borough, Gibbsboro and Voorhees Township. As of the 2021–22 school year, the high school had an enrollment of 1,998 students and 137.0 classroom teachers (on an FTE basis), for a student–teacher ratio of 14.6:1. Seats on the nine-member board of education are allocated based on population, with Berlin Borough assigned two seats on the board.

Students from Berlin Borough, and from all of Camden County, are eligible to attend the Camden County Technical Schools, a countywide public school district that serves the vocational and technical education needs of students at the high school and post-secondary level at the Gloucester Township Campus in the Sicklerville section of Gloucester Township or the Pennsauken Camps in Pennsauken Township. Students are accepted based on district admission standards and costs of attendance and transportation are covered by the home district of each student.

Our Lady of Mount Carmel Regional School, founded in 1956, is an elementary school that operates under the auspices of the Roman Catholic Diocese of Camden serving students in grades PreK-8.

== Transportation ==
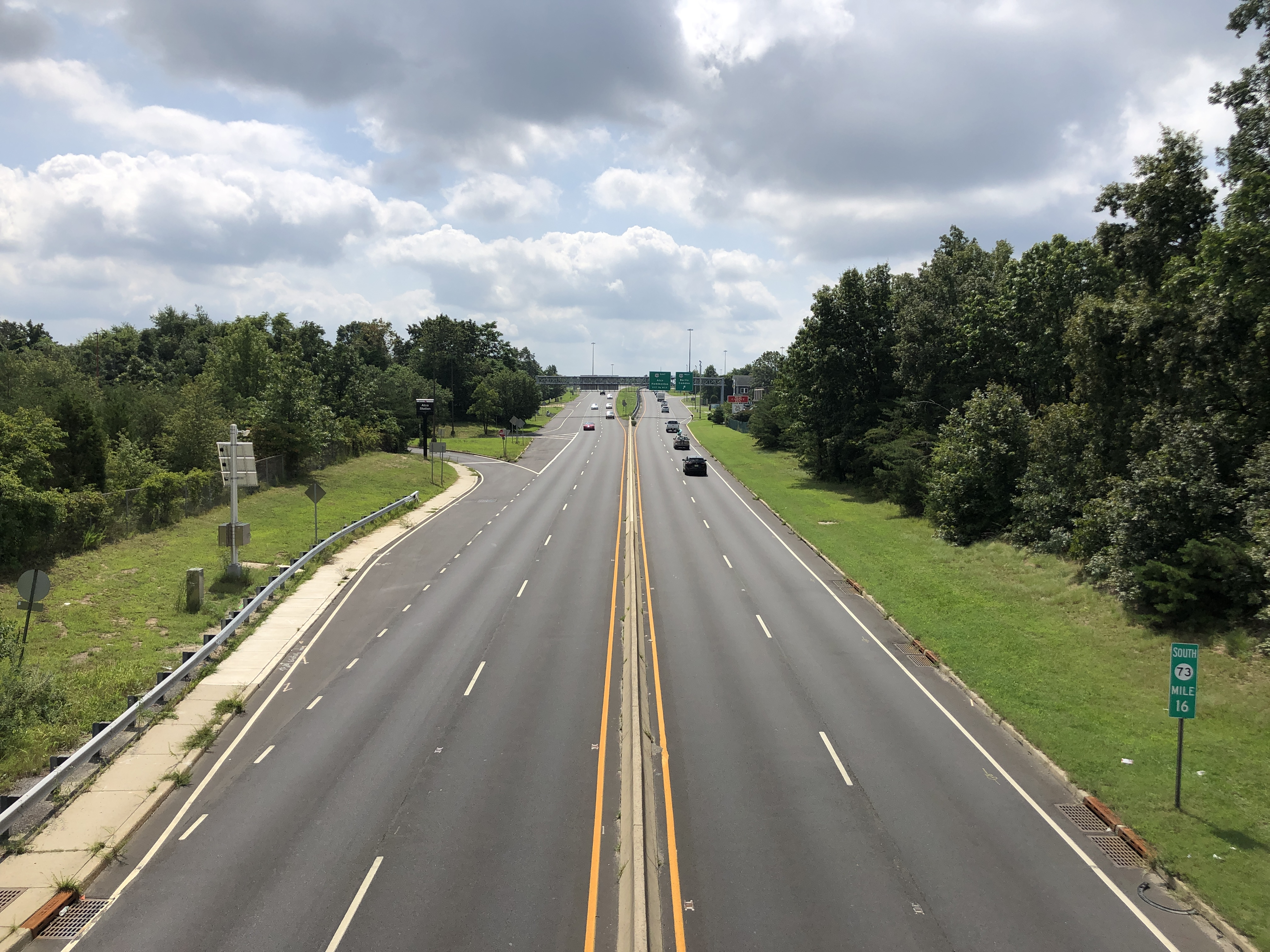
Route 73 on the east edge of Berlin

=== Roads and highways ===
As of May 2010, the borough had a total of 41.51 miles (66.80 km) of roadways, of which 27.66 miles (44.51 km) were maintained by the municipality, 9.52 miles (15.32 km) by Camden County and 4.33 miles (6.97 km) by the New Jersey Department of Transportation.

U.S. Route 30 is the main highway serving Berlin. New Jersey Route 73 also brushes the east side of the borough.

=== Public transportation ===
NJ Transit bus service is available in the borough on the 554 route, which operates between the Lindenwold train station and Atlantic City. This service is also available on the 406 route, which operates between Berlin and Philadelphia.

Camden County Airport is located one mile southwest of the central business district.

Berlin was formerly served by the Berlin Railroad Station.

== Notable people ==
People who were born in, residents of, or otherwise closely associated with Berlin include:

- Rachel Dawson (born 1985), field hockey midfielder
- Sarah Dawson (born 1982), field hockey forward / midfielder
- Ron Dayne (born 1978), former NFL running back.
- Kyle Maack (born 1992), R&B and soul singer
- Walter E. Pedersen (1911–1998), union leader and politician who served as Mayor of Clementon and a two-year term in the New Jersey General Assembly
- Kelly Ripa (born 1970), host of Live with Kelly and Mark and soap opera actress
- Logan Ryan (born 1991), cornerback who plays in the NFL for the New York Giants
- Davis Schneider (born 1999), professional baseball infielder and outfielder for the Toronto Blue Jays
