= Lindenwold Public Schools =

School district in Camden County, New Jersey, US

Address
- 801 Egg Harbor Road Lindenwold, Camden County, New Jersey, 08021; United States
- Coordinates: 39.808877°N 75.003091°W

District information
- Grades: PreK-12
- Superintendent: Kristin O'Neil
- Business administrator: Kathleen Huder
- Schools: 5

Students and staff
- Enrollment: 3,100 (as of 2022–23)
- Faculty: 255.5 FTEs
- Student–teacher ratio: 12.1:1

Other information
- District Factor Group: B
- Website: www.lindenwold.k12.nj.us
Ind.	Per pupil	District spending	Rank (*)	K-12 average	%± vs. average
1A	Total Spending	$17,836	33	$18,891	−5.6%
1	Budgetary Cost	12,780	17	14,783	−13.5%
2	Classroom Instruction	7,318	12	8,763	−16.5%
6	Support Services	1,932	24	2,392	−19.2%
8	Administrative Cost	1,660	50	1,485	11.8%
10	Operations & Maintenance	1,513	26	1,783	−15.1%
13	Extracurricular Activities	357	25	268	33.2%
16	Median Teacher Salary	56,502	11	64,043
Data from NJDoE 2014 Taxpayers' Guide to Education Spending. *Of K-12 districts with 1,800-3,500 students. Lowest spending=1; Highest=68

The Lindenwold Public Schools are a comprehensive community public school district that serves students in pre-kindergarten through twelfth grade from Lindenwold, in Camden County, in the U.S. state of New Jersey.

As of the 2022–23 school year, the district, comprised of five schools, had an enrollment of 3,100 students and 255.5 classroom teachers (on an FTE basis), for a student–teacher ratio of 12.1:1.

The district is classified by the New Jersey Department of Education as being in District Factor Group "B", the second lowest of eight groupings. District Factor Groups organize districts statewide to allow comparison by common socioeconomic characteristics of the local districts. From lowest socioeconomic status to highest, the categories are A, B, CD, DE, FG, GH, I and J.

== Schools ==
Schools in the district (with 2022–23 enrollment data from the National Center for Education Statistics) are:

Elementary schools

- Lindenwold Preschool with 171 students in PreK
- Lindenwold School 4 with 593 students in grades K-4
  - Dana Lawrence, principal
- Lindenwold School 5 with 656 students in grades K-4
  - Sandra Martinez-Preyor, principal

Middle school

- Lindenwold Middle School with 911 students in grades 5-8
  - Joe Tabasco, principal

High school

- Lindenwold High School with 727 students in grades 9-12
  - Fred Geardino, principal

== Administration ==
Core members of the district's administration are:

- Kristin O'Neil, superintendent
- Kathleen Huder, business administrator and board secretary

== Board of education ==
The district's board of education, comprised of nine members, sets policy and oversees the fiscal and educational operation of the district through its administration. As a Type II school district, the board's trustees are elected directly by voters to serve three-year terms of office on a staggered basis, with three seats up for election each year held (since 2012) as part of the November general election. The board appoints a superintendent to oversee the district's day-to-day operations and a business administrator to supervise the business functions of the district.
