= Lindenwold High School =

High school in Camden County, New Jersey, US

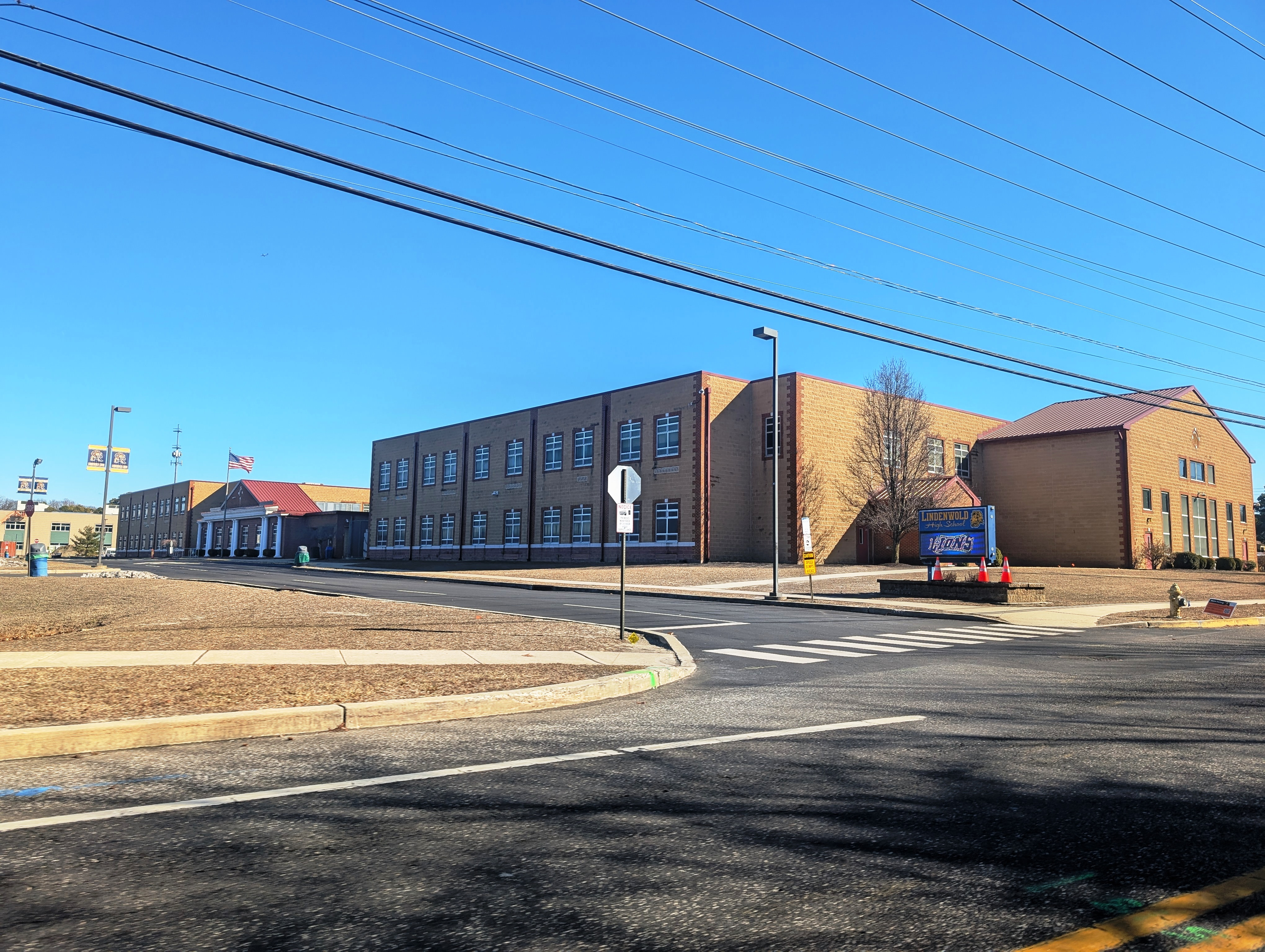

Location
- 801 Egg Harbor Road; Lindenwold, Camden County, New Jersey 08021; United States
- 39.820853°N 74.97752°W

Information
- Type: Public high school
- Established: 2001
- School board: Lindenwold Board of Education
- School district: Lindenwold Public Schools
- NCES School ID: 340864000429
- Principal: Fred Geardino
- Faculty: 61.0 FTEs
- Grades: 9-12
- Enrollment: 802 (as of 2024–25)
- Student to teacher ratio: 13.2:1
- Colors: Navy blue Gold
- Athletics conference: Colonial Conference (general); West Jersey Football League (football)
- Team name: Lions
- Website: lhs.lindenwold.k12.nj.us

Lindenwold High School is a four-year comprehensive public high school that serves students in ninth through twelfth grades from Lindenwold, in Camden County, in the U.S. state of New Jersey, operating as the lone secondary school of the Lindenwold Public Schools.

As of the 2024–25 school year, the school had an enrollment of 802 students and 61.0 classroom teachers (on an FTE basis), for a student–teacher ratio of 13.2:1. There were 606 students (75.6% of enrollment) eligible for free lunch and 54 (6.7% of students) eligible for reduced-cost lunch.

== History ==
Constructed at a cost of $17 million (equivalent to $30.9 million in 2025), the new high school opened in September 2001 with 630 students in grades 9-12, having been created following the dissolution of the Lower Camden County Regional School District.

== Awards, recognition, and rankings ==
The school was the 283rd-ranked public high school in New Jersey out of 339 schools statewide in New Jersey Monthly magazine's September 2014 cover story on the state's "Top Public High Schools," using a new ranking methodology. The school had been ranked 196th in the state of 328 schools in 2012, after being ranked 254th in 2010 out of 322 schools listed. The magazine ranked the school 256th in 2008 out of 316 schools. The school was ranked 267th in the magazine's September 2006 issue, which surveyed 316 schools across the state.

Lindenwold High School is a member of the Success Practice's Network, an organization of schools run by the International Center for Leadership in Education. LHS' Freshmen Seminar Program is recognized as a model "best practice" by the network. Freshmen Seminar is a year-long, character education and literacy mentor program required of all incoming 9th graders.

Princeton University recognized Lindenwold High School's Ann Ryan as one of four outstanding New Jersey secondary school teachers at its commencement ceremonies on June 6, 2006. Ryan was selected for the award from among 68 nominations from public and private schools statewide.

== Extracurricular activities ==
Staff and students produce a variety of plays and concerts that entertain the entire Lindenwold community. The high school also sponsors many other clubs that serve the community such as Interact Club, LEO Club, and Student Government Services. And, the theater program is not too shabby.

- Cheerleading (girls)
- Track and Field (boys and girls)
- Field Hockey (girls)
- Girls' Soccer
- Boys' Soccer
- Archery (boys and girls)
- Tennis (boys and girls)
- Iron Chef
- Girls' Cross Country
- Boys' Cross Country
- Boys' Hop Scotch
- Marching Band
- Theater

=== Athletics ===
Lindenwold High School Lions compete as a member school in the Colonial Conference, which is comprised of small schools whose enrollments generally do not exceed between 750-800 students for grades 9-12 and operates under the supervision of the New Jersey State Interscholastic Athletic Association (NJSIAA). With 556 students in grades 10-12, the school was classified by the NJSIAA for the 2022–24 school years as Group II South for most athletic competition purposes. The football team competes in the Horizon Division of the 94-team West Jersey Football League superconference and was classified by the NJSIAA as Group II South for football for 2024–2026, which included schools with 514 to 685 students.

During 2004-05 the Lindenwold High School boys' bowling team captured their third straight Olympic Conference championship and their first South Jersey state crown. The boys' bowling team won a fourth conference title during the 2006-07 season, and yet another in the 2008-09 season.

During the 2008-09 season the Lindenwold High School boys' track and field team captured their first Colonial Conference championship in school history. In 2009-10, the boys repeated as champions.

== Administration ==
The school's interim principal is Fred Geardino. His administration team includes two assistant principals and the athletic supervisor.
