= Pine Hill Schools =

School district in Camden County, New Jersey, US

Address
- 1003 Turnersville Road Pine Hill, Camden County, New Jersey, 08021; United States
- Coordinates: 39.808877°N 75.003091°W

District information
- Grades: PreK-12
- Superintendent: Kenneth Koczur
- Business administrator: Deborah Piccirillo
- Schools: 4

Students and staff
- Enrollment: 1,899 (as of 2018–19)
- Faculty: 168.6 FTEs
- Student–teacher ratio: 11.3:1

Other information
- District Factor Group: B
- Website: www.pinehill.k12.nj.us
Ind.	Per pupil	District spending	Rank (*)	K-12 average	%± vs. average
1A	Total Spending	$20,146	57	$18,891	6.6%
1	Budgetary Cost	15,393	55	14,783	4.1%
2	Classroom Instruction	9,102	58	8,763	3.9%
6	Support Services	2,099	38	2,392	−12.2%
8	Administrative Cost	1,452	25	1,485	−2.2%
10	Operations & Maintenance	2,242	64	1,783	25.7%
13	Extracurricular Activities	406	42	268	51.5%
16	Median Teacher Salary	58,321	16	64,043
Data from NJDoE 2014 Taxpayers' Guide to Education Spending. *Of K-12 districts with 1,800-3,500 students. Lowest spending=1; Highest=68

The Pine Hill Schools are a comprehensive community public school district that serves students in pre-kindergarten through twelfth grade from Pine Hill, in Camden County, in the U.S. state of New Jersey.

As of the 2018–19 school year, the district, comprised of four schools, had an enrollment of 1,899 students and 168.6 classroom teachers (on an FTE basis), for a student–teacher ratio of 11.3:1.

The district is classified by the New Jersey Department of Education as being in District Factor Group "B", the second lowest of eight groupings. District Factor Groups organize districts statewide to allow comparison by common socioeconomic characteristics of the local districts. From lowest socioeconomic status to highest, the categories are A, B, CD, DE, FG, GH, I and J.

Following the dissolution of the Lower Camden County Regional School District, Overbrook High School became part of the Pine Hill district as of September 2001, with students from Berlin Township and Clementon attending the school as part of sending/receiving relationships.

== Schools ==
Schools in the district (with 2018–19 enrollment data from the National Center for Education Statistics) are:

Elementary schools

- Albert Bean Elementary School with 370 students in grades PreK-5
  - Dan Schuster, principal
- John H. Glenn Elementary School with 453 students in grades PreK-5
  - Fawn Mutschler, principal

Middle school

- Pine Hill Middle School with 377 students in grades 6-8
  - Pia Garbutt, principal

High school

- Overbrook High School with 656 students in grades 9-12
  - John Carullo, principal

== Administration ==
Core members of the district's administration are:

- Kenneth Koczur, superintendent
- Deborah Piccirillo, business administrator and board secretary

== Board of education ==
The district's board of education, comprised of nine members, sets policy and oversees the fiscal and educational operation of the district through its administration. As a Type II school district, the board's trustees are elected directly by voters to serve three-year terms of office on a staggered basis, with three seats up for election each year held (since 2012) as part of the November general election. The board appoints a superintendent to oversee the district's day-to-day operations and a business administrator to supervise the business functions of the district. Berlin Township and Clementon are represented on the board by members appointed by the sending district.
