= Pine Hill, New Jersey =

Borough in Camden County, New Jersey, US

- Borough
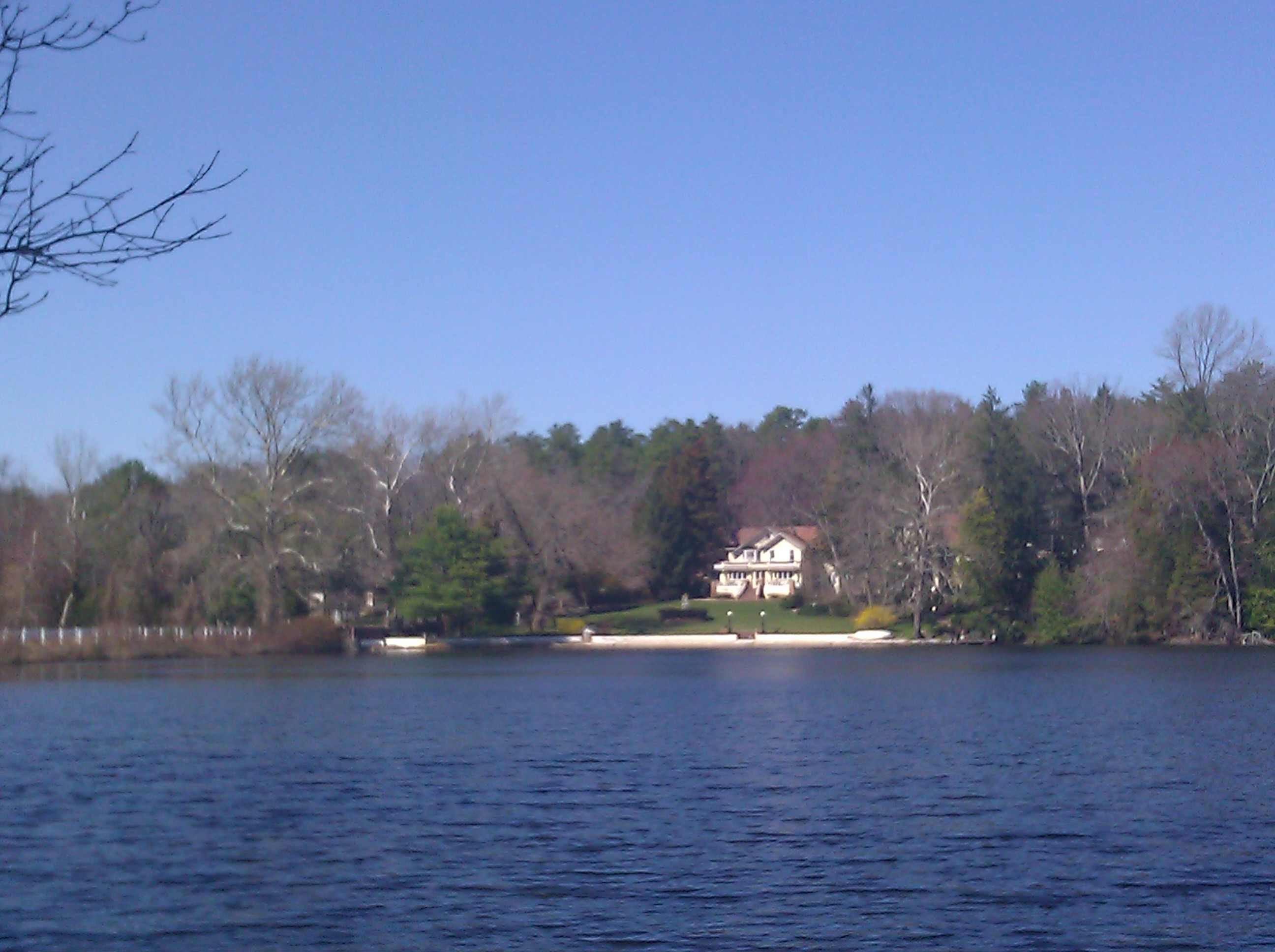
- House believed to have been owned by Al Capone

- Seal
- Motto: "Home for a Lifetime"
- Location of Pine Hill in Camden County highlighted in red (right). Inset map: Location of Camden County in New Jersey highlighted in orange (left).

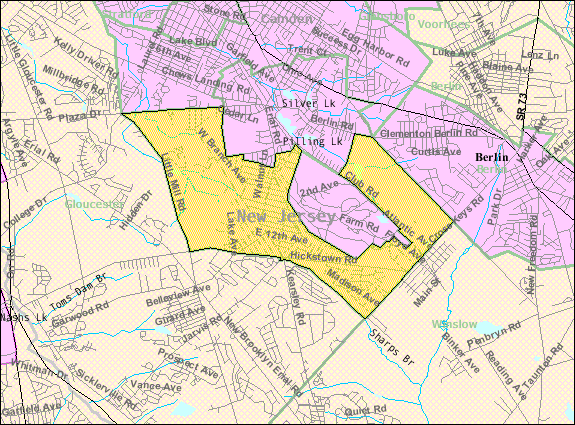
- Census Bureau map of Pine Hill, New Jersey

- Location in Camden County Location in New Jersey Location in the United States
- Coordinates: 39.788974°N 74.986884°W
- Country: United States
- State: New Jersey
- County: Camden
- Incorporated: April 23, 1929

Government
  - Type: Borough
  - Body: Borough Council
  - Mayor: Christopher Green (D, term ends December 31, 2023)
  - Administrator: John F. Greer
  - Municipal clerk: Patricia Hendricks

Area
  - Total: 4.92 sq mi (12.75 km^{2})
  - Land: 4.86 sq mi (12.60 km^{2})
  - Water: 0.058 sq mi (0.15 km^{2}) 1.06%
  - Rank: 299th of 565 in state 8th of 37 in county
- Elevation: 174 ft (53 m)

Population (2020)
  - Total: 10,743
  - Estimate (2023): 10,783
  - Rank: 234th of 565 in state 13th of 37 in county
  - Density: 2,746.9/sq mi (1,060.6/km^{2})
  - Rank: 235th of 565 in state 27th of 37 in county
- Time zone: UTC−05:00 (Eastern (EST))
  - Summer (DST): UTC−04:00 (Eastern (EDT))
- ZIP Code: 08021
- Area code: 856
- FIPS code: 3400758770
- GNIS feature ID: 0885352
- Website: www.pinehillboronj.com

Pine Hill is a borough in Camden County, in the U.S. state of New Jersey. As of the 2020 United States census, the borough's population was 10,743, an increase of 510 (+5.0%) from the 2010 census count of 10,233, which in turn reflected a decline of 647 (−5.9%) from the 10,880 counted in the 2000 census.

Pine Hill was created on April 23, 1929, from Clementon Township, one of seven municipalities created from the now-defunct township, and one of five new municipalities, including Hi-Nella Borough, Lindenwold Borough, Pine Valley Borough, and Somerdale Borough, created on that same date. Earlier known as Mont Ararat or Clementon Heights, the name "Pine Hill" was chosen to reflect the trees and terrain of the area.

The borough of Pine Valley agreed to be absorbed into Pine Hill in 2021. The merger took effect on January 1, 2022, adding $20 million in taxable property and the famed golf course into Pine Hill. The merger of the two municipalities was the first in the state since Princeton was formed in 2011 from the former Princeton Borough and Princeton Township, New Jersey.

The borough had the 16th-highest property tax rate in New Jersey, with an equalized rate of 4.520% in 2020, compared to 3.470% in the county as a whole and a statewide average of 2.279%.

== Geography ==
According to the U.S. Census Bureau, the borough had a total area of 3.95 square miles (10.24 km^{2}), including 3.91 square miles (10.13 km^{2}) of land and 0.04 square miles (0.11 km^{2}) of water (1.06%). The borough borders Berlin Borough, Clementon Borough, Gloucester Township, Lindenwold, and Winslow Township.

== Demographics ==
Historical population
Census	Pop.	Note	%±
1930	1,392		—
1940	1,537		10.4%
1950	2,546		65.6%
1960	3,939		54.7%
1970	5,132		30.3%
1980	8,684		69.2%
1990	9,854		13.5%
2000	10,880		10.4%
2010	10,233		−5.9%
2020	10,743		5.0%
2023 (est.)	10,783	▲	0.4%
Population sources:1930–2000 1930 1940–2000; 2000 2010 2020

=== 2020 census ===
As of the 2020 census, Pine Hill had a population of 10,743. The median age was 37.7 years. 22.2% of residents were under the age of 18 and 13.7% of residents were 65 years of age or older. For every 100 females there were 86.2 males, and for every 100 females age 18 and over there were 82.2 males age 18 and over.

100.0% of residents lived in urban areas, while 0.0% lived in rural areas.

There were 4,399 households in Pine Hill, of which 30.7% had children under the age of 18 living in them. Of all households, 34.3% were married-couple households, 18.2% were households with a male householder and no spouse or partner present, and 37.6% were households with a female householder and no spouse or partner present. About 31.4% of all households were made up of individuals and 9.9% had someone living alone who was 65 years of age or older.

There were 4,637 housing units, of which 5.1% were vacant. The homeowner vacancy rate was 2.2% and the rental vacancy rate was 3.9%.

Racial composition as of the 2020 census
Race	Number	Percent
White	5,826	54.2%
Black or African American	3,065	28.5%
American Indian and Alaska Native	48	0.4%
Asian	294	2.7%
Native Hawaiian and Other Pacific Islander	0	0.0%
Some other race	592	5.5%
Two or more races	918	8.5%
Hispanic or Latino (of any race)	1,263	11.8%

=== 2010 census ===
The 2010 United States census counted 10,233 people, 4,086 households, and 2,603 families in the borough. The population density was 2,643.4 per square mile (1,020.6/km^{2}). There were 4,357 housing units at an average density of 1,125.5 per square mile (434.6/km^{2}). The racial makeup was 67.47% (6,904) White, 24.07% (2,463) Black or African American, 0.26% (27) Native American, 2.12% (217) Asian, 0.05% (5) Pacific Islander, 2.40% (246) from other races, and 3.63% (371) from two or more races. Hispanic or Latino of any race were 6.74% (690) of the population.

Of the 4,086 households, 30.2% had children under the age of 18; 38.6% were married couples living together; 18.8% had a female householder with no husband present and 36.3% were non-families. Of all households, 29.1% were made up of individuals and 7.2% had someone living alone who was 65 years of age or older. The average household size was 2.50 and the average family size was 3.10.

23.9% of the population were under the age of 18, 9.8% from 18 to 24, 30.0% from 25 to 44, 27.5% from 45 to 64, and 8.7% who were 65 years of age or older. The median age was 35.1 years. For every 100 females, the population had 88.7 males. For every 100 females ages 18 and older there were 84.2 males.

The Census Bureau's 2006–2010 American Community Survey showed that, in 2010 inflation-adjusted dollars, median household income was $53,236 with a margin of error of +/− $3,808, and the median family income was $71,789 (+/− $4,439). Males had a median income of $47,094 (+/− $3,168) versus $41,711 (+/− $3,474) for females. The per capita income for the borough was $24,610 (+/− $1,792). About 11.0% of families and 13.8% of the population were below the poverty line, including 19.1% of those under age 18 and 10.3% of those age 65 or over.

=== 2000 census ===
As of the 2000 United States census, there were 10,880 people, 4,214 households, and 2,743 families residing in the borough. The population density was 2,768.4 inhabitants per square mile (1,068.9/km^{2}). There were 4,444 housing units at an average density of 1,130.8 per square mile (436.6/km^{2}). The racial makeup of the borough was 76.79% White, 18.35% African American, 0.28% Native American, 1.41% Asian, 0.02% Pacific Islander, 1.21% from other races, and 1.95% from two or more races. Hispanic or Latino of any race were 3.64% of the population.

There were 4,214 households, out of which 35.5% had children under the age of 18 living with them, 42.9% were married couples living together, 16.9% had a female householder with no husband present, and 34.9% were non-families. 27.8% of all households were made up of individuals, and 7.8% had someone living alone who was 65 years of age or older. The average household size was 2.58 and the average family size was 3.18.

In the borough, the population was spread out, with 27.2% under the age of 18, 9.2% from 18 to 24, 34.9% from 25 to 44, 20.2% from 45 to 64, and 8.5% who were 65 years of age or older. The median age was 33 years. For every 100 females, there were 90.2 males. For every 100 females age 18 and over, there were 85.8 males.

The median income for a household in the borough was $42,035, and the median income for a family was $50,040. Males had a median income of $36,277 versus $29,826 for females. The per capita income for the borough was $18,613. About 5.9% of families and 7.1% of the population were below the poverty line, including 8.9% of those under age 18 and 6.7% of those age 65 or over.

== Government ==
=== Local government ===
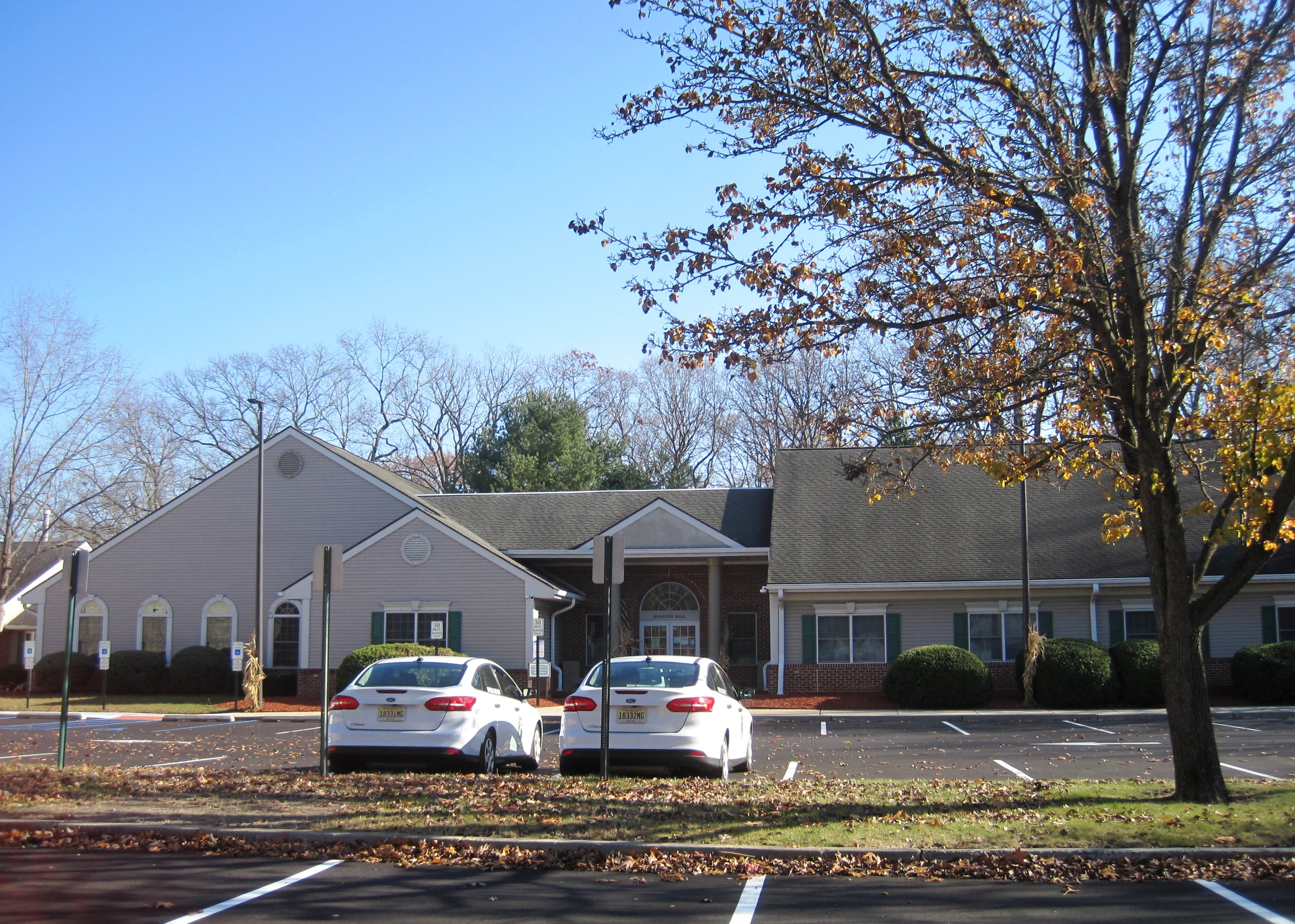
Pine Hill Borough Hall

Pine Hill is governed under the borough form of New Jersey municipal government, which is used in 218 municipalities (of the 564) statewide, making it the most common form of government in New Jersey. The governing body is comprised of a mayor and a borough council, with all positions elected at-large on a partisan basis as part of the November general election. A mayor is elected directly by the voters to a four-year term of office. The borough council includes six members elected to serve three-year terms on a staggered basis, with two seats coming up for election each year in a three-year cycle. The borough form of government used by Pine Hill is a "weak mayor / strong council" government in which council members act as the legislative body with the mayor presiding at meetings and voting only in the event of a tie. The mayor can veto ordinances subject to an override by a two-thirds majority vote of the council. The mayor makes committee and liaison assignments for council members, and most appointments are made by the mayor with the advice and consent of the council.

As of 2023, the mayor of Pine Hill Borough is Democrat Christopher Green, whose term of office ends December 31, 2023. Members of the Pine Hill Borough Council are Terence G. "Terry" Burke (D, 2025), Patricia L. Corry-Gaft (D, 2023), Thomas B. Knott (D, 2024), John J. Robb (D, 2024), Erica Wakeley (D, 2023; elected to serve an unexpired term) and Charles E. Warrington Jr. (D, 2025).

In July 2022, Erica Wakely was appointed to fill the seat expiring in December 2023 that had been held by Charles Jaxel until he resigned from office Wakely served on an interim basis until the November 2022 general election when he was elected to serve the balance of the term of office.

=== Federal, state, and county representation ===
Pine Hill is located in the 1st Congressional District and is part of New Jersey's 6th state legislative district.

For the 119th United States Congress, New Jersey's 1st congressional district is represented by Donald Norcross (D, Camden). New Jersey is represented in the United States Senate by Democrats Cory Booker (Newark, term ends 2027) and Andy Kim (Moorestown, term ends 2031).

For the 2026–2027 session, the 6th legislative district of the New Jersey Legislature is represented in the State Senate by James Beach (D, Voorhees Township) and in the General Assembly by Louis Greenwald (D, Voorhees Township) and Melinda Kane (D, Cherry Hill).

Camden County is governed by a Board of County Commissioners composed of seven members chosen at-large in partisan elections for three-year terms on a staggered basis by the residents of the county, with either two or three seats up for election each year as part of the November general election. At a reorganization meeting held in January after each election, the newly constituted Board of Commissioners selects one member to serve as Director and another as Deputy Director, each serving a one-year term in that role. As of 2025, Camden County's Commissioners are: Commissioner Director Louis Cappelli Jr. (D, Collingswood, 2026), Commissioner Deputy Director Edward T. McDonnell (D, Pennsauken Township, 2025), Virginia Ruiz Betteridge (D, Runnemede, 2025), Almar Dyer (D, Pennsauken Township, 2027), Melinda Kane (D, Cherry Hill, 2027), Jeffrey L. Nash (D, Winslow Township, 2027), and Jonathan L. Young Sr. (D, Berlin Township, 2026).

Camden County's constitutional officers are: Clerk Pamela Rosen Lampitt (D, Cherry Hill, 2029) Sheriff Chuck Billingham (D, Gloucester City, 2027) and Surrogate Michelle Gentek-Mayer (D, Gloucester Township, 2025).

=== Politics ===
As of March 2011, there were a total of 6,425 registered voters in Pine Hill, of which 2,586 (40.2%) were registered as Democrats, 634 (9.9%) were registered as Republicans and 3,201 (49.8%) were registered as Unaffiliated. There were 4 voters registered as Libertarians or Greens.

Gubernatorial election results for Pine Hill
Year	Republican		Democratic		Third party(ies)	
Year	No.	%	No.	%	No.	%
2025	1,042	30.81%	2,318	68.54%	22	0.65%
2021	946	37.05%	1,589	62.24%	18	0.71%
2017	561	27.86%	1,392	69.12%	61	3.03%
2013	988	51.35%	903	46.93%	33	1.72%
2009	769	36.57%	1,165	55.40%	169	8.04%
2005	668	33.28%	1,239	61.73%	100	4.98%

In the 2012 presidential election, Democrat Barack Obama received 74.8% of the vote (3,087 cast), ahead of Republican Mitt Romney with 23.9% (987 votes), and other candidates with 1.3% (52 votes), among the 4,162 ballots cast by the borough's 6,965 registered voters (36 ballots were spoiled), for a turnout of 59.8%. In the 2008 presidential election, Democrat Barack Obama received 70.4% of the vote (3,029 cast), ahead of Republican John McCain, who received around 26.2% (1,127 votes), with 4,304 ballots cast among the borough's 6,203 registered voters, for a turnout of 69.4%. In the 2004 presidential election, Democrat John Kerry received 65.5% of the vote (2,578 ballots cast), outpolling Republican George W. Bush, who received around 32.9% (1,294 votes), with 3,936 ballots cast among the borough's 5,912 registered voters, for a turnout percentage of 66.6.

United States presidential election results for Pine Hill
Year	Republican		Democratic		Third party(ies)	
Year	No.	%	No.	%	No.	%
2024	1,691	36.83%	2,841	61.88%	59	1.29%
2020	1,659	32.87%	3,326	65.90%	62	1.23%
2016	1,377	33.12%	2,635	63.39%	145	3.49%
2012	987	23.92%	3,087	74.82%	52	1.26%
2008	1,127	26.18%	3,029	70.38%	148	3.44%
2004	1,294	32.88%	2,578	65.50%	64	1.63%

In the 2013 gubernatorial election, Republican Chris Christie received 51.4% of the vote (988 cast), ahead of Democrat Barbara Buono with 46.9% (903 votes), and other candidates with 1.7% (33 votes), among the 1,966 ballots cast by the borough's 7,046 registered voters (42 ballots were spoiled), for a turnout of 27.9%. In the 2009 gubernatorial election, Democrat Jon Corzine received 55.4% of the vote (1,165 ballots cast), ahead of both Republican Chris Christie with 36.6% (769 votes) and Independent Chris Daggett with 4.9% (102 votes), with 2,103 ballots cast among the borough's 6,369 registered voters, yielding a 33.0% turnout.

United States Senate election results for Pine Hill1
Year	Republican		Democratic		Third party(ies)	
Year	No.	%	No.	%	No.	%
2024	1,492	33.85%	2,861	64.90%	55	1.25%
2018	993	31.59%	1,959	62.33%	191	6.08%
2012	890	22.72%	2,973	75.88%	55	1.40%
2006	579	29.38%	1,316	66.77%	76	3.86%

United States Senate election results for Pine Hill2
Year	Republican		Democratic		Third party(ies)	
Year	No.	%	No.	%	No.	%
2020	1,574	31.56%	3,349	67.15%	64	1.28%
2014	496	26.26%	1,363	72.15%	30	1.59%
2013	335	28.66%	820	70.15%	14	1.20%
2008	1,042	26.78%	2,784	71.55%	65	1.67%

== Education ==
The Pine Hill Schools serve public school students in pre-kindergarten through twelfth grade. As of the 2018–19 school year, the district, comprised of four schools, had an enrollment of 1,899 students and 168.6 classroom teachers (on an FTE basis), for a student–teacher ratio of 11.3:1. Schools in the district (with 2018–19 enrollment data from the National Center for Education Statistics) are Dr. Albert Bean Elementary School with 370 students in grades Pre-K–5, John H. Glenn Elementary School with 453 students in grades Pre-K–5, Pine Hill Middle School with 377 students in grades 6–8, and Overbrook High School with 656 students in grades 9–12.

Following the dissolution of the Lower Camden County Regional School District, Overbrook High School became part of the Pine Hill district as of September 2001, with students from Berlin Township and Clementon attending the school as part of sending/receiving relationships.

== Transportation ==
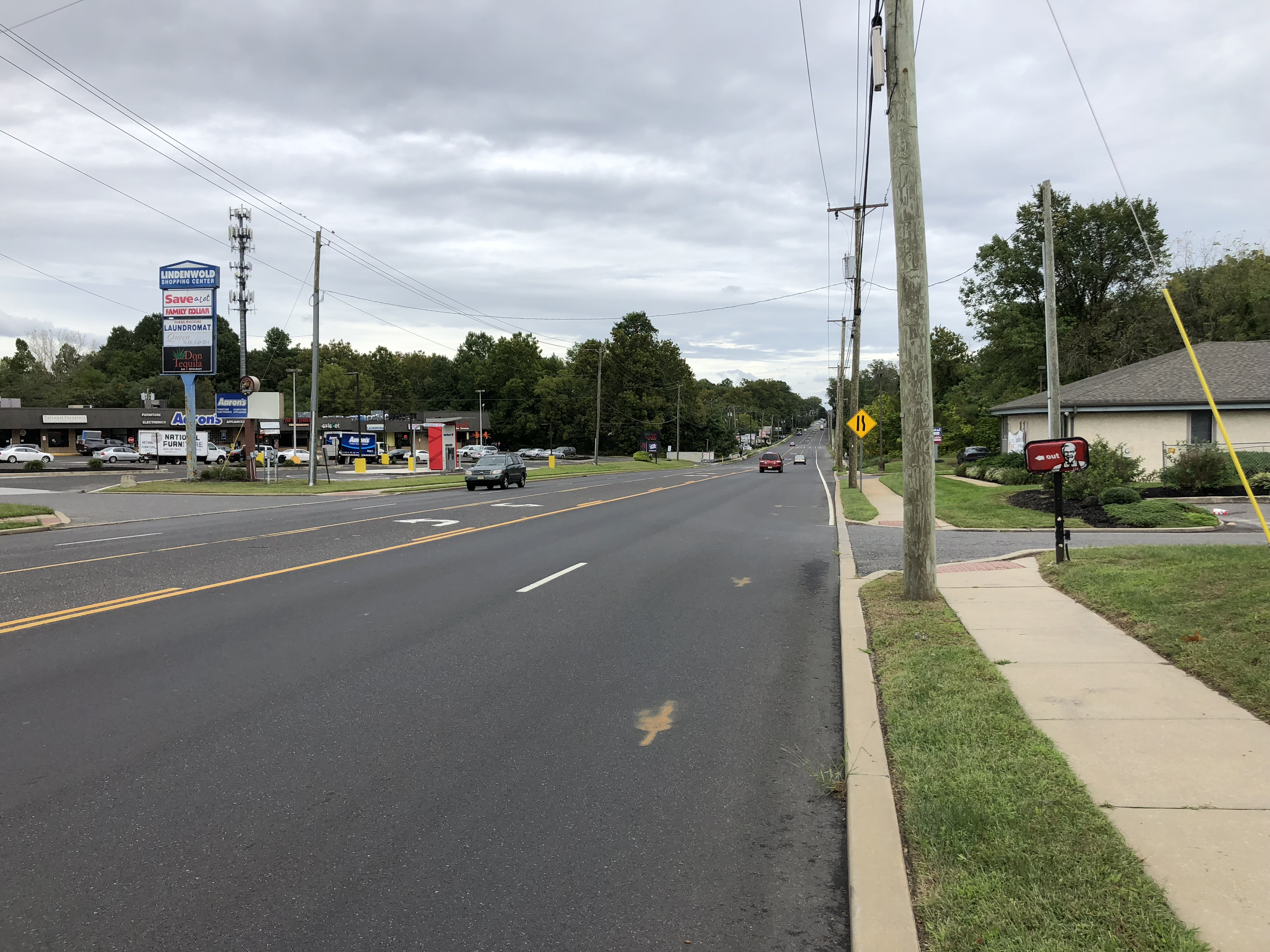
County Road 534 eastbound on the north edge of Pine Hill

=== Roads and highways ===
As of May 2010, the borough had a total of 32.13 miles (51.71 km) of roadways, of which 24.15 miles (38.87 km) were maintained by the municipality and 7.98 miles (12.84 km) by Camden County.

County Route 534 is the only significant roadway serving Pine Hill directly, running 1.2 miles (1.9 km) through the borough.

=== Public transportation ===
NJ Transit bus service between Turnersville and Camden is available on the 403 route.

== Notable people ==
People who were born in, residents of, or otherwise closely associated with Pine Hill include:

- Ron Dayne (born 1978), former NFL running back who won the 1999 Heisman Trophy
- Peter DeMarco (1932–2005), a physician who specialized in regenerative medicine
- Lucinda Florio (1947–2022), teacher and advocate for education and literacy, who, as the wife of former New Jersey Governor James Florio, served as the First Lady of New Jersey
- Jermaine Jones (born 1986), who competed on the eleventh season of American Idol
- Tim Lenahan (born 1959), retired soccer coach known for his 20-year tenure as the head men's soccer coach at Northwestern University
- John Vukovich (1947–2007), professional baseball utility infielder, manager and coach
- Nick Walker (born 1994), professional bodybuilder
