= Gloucester Township Public Schools =

School district in Camden County, New Jersey, US

Address
- 17 Erial Road Blackwood, Camden County, New Jersey, 08012; United States
- Coordinates: 39.809931°N 75.065921°W

District information
- Grades: PreK-8
- Superintendent: John D. Bilodeau
- Business administrator: Janice Grassia
- Schools: 11

Students and staff
- Enrollment: 6,481 (as of 2020–21)
- Faculty: 534.3 FTEs
- Student–teacher ratio: 12.1:1

Other information
- District Factor Group: DE
- Website: www.gloucestertownshipschools.org
Ind.	Per pupil	District spending	Rank (*)	K-8 average	%± vs. average
1A	Total Spending	$15,649	16	$18,891	−17.2%
1	Budgetary Cost	11,851	12	14,159	−16.3%
2	Classroom Instruction	7,816	23	8,659	−9.7%
6	Support Services	1,494	8	2,167	−31.1%
8	Administrative Cost	1,143	3	1,547	−26.1%
10	Operations & Maintenance	1,244	16	1,612	−22.8%
13	Extracurricular Activities	119	64	104	14.4%
16	Median Teacher Salary	64,155	62	61,136
Data from NJDoE 2014 Taxpayers' Guide to Education Spending. *Of K-8 districts with more than 750 students. Lowest spending=1; Highest=84

The Gloucester Township Public Schools is a community public school district serving students in pre-kindergarten through eighth grade from Gloucester Township, in Camden County, in the U.S. state of New Jersey. The district operates eight PreK/K-5 elementary schools and three grade 6-8 middle schools, including the Ann A. Mullen Middle School, dedicated in September 1996 and named in honor of former mayor Ann A. Mullen. The district describes itself as the state's largest elementary school district.

As of the 2020–21 school year, the district, comprising 11 schools, had an enrollment of 6,481 students and 534.3 classroom teachers (on an FTE basis), for a student–teacher ratio of 12.1:1.

The district is classified by the New Jersey Department of Education as being in District Factor Group "DE", the fifth-highest of eight groupings. District Factor Groups organize districts statewide to allow comparison by common socioeconomic characteristics of the local districts. From lowest socioeconomic status to highest, the categories are A, B, CD, DE, FG, GH, I and J.

Students in public school for ninth through twelfth grades attend one of the three high schools that are part of the Black Horse Pike Regional School District. The schools in the district (with 2020–21 enrollment data from the National Center for Education Statistics) are Highland Regional High School (1,188 students; located in Blackwood), Timber Creek Regional High School (1,187; Erial) or Triton Regional High School (1,103; Runnemede). Students from Gloucester Township attend one of the three schools based on their residence address; students from Bellmawr and Runnemede, the other two communities in the district, all attend Triton High School.

== Awards and recognition ==
In 2022, the United States Department of Education announced that Glendora Elementary School was named as a National Blue Ribbon School, along with eight other schools in the state and 297 schools nationwide.

== Schools ==
Schools in the district (with 2020–21 enrollment data from the National Center for Education Statistics) are:

Elementary schools

- Blackwood Elementary School (581 students; in grades PreK-5)
  - Alexander Ferrante, principal
- Chews Elementary School (662; PreK-5)
  - LaWayne Williams, principal
- Erial Elementary School (650; PreK-5)
  - Maria McKeown, principal
- Glendora Elementary School (232; K-5)
  - Patrick McCarthy, principal
- Gloucester Township Elementary School (252; K-5)
  - Joseph Gentile, principal
- James W. Lilley Jr. Elementary School (494; K-5)
  - Theodore Otten, principal
- Loring-Flemming Elementary School (651; K-5)
  - Aaron J. Rose, principal
- Union Valley Elementary School (476; K-5)
  - Tracy J. Elwell, principal

Middle schools

- Glen Landing Middle School (657; 6-8)
  - Takisha Jones, principal
- Charles W. Lewis Middle School (657; 6-8)
  - Theodore Otten, principal
- Ann A. Mullen Middle School (919; 6-8)
  - Angela Rose-Bounds, principal

== Administration ==
Core members of the district's administration are:

- John D. Bilodeau, superintendent
- Janice Grassia, business administrator and board secretary

== Board of education ==
The district's board of education, comprised of nine members, sets policy and oversees the fiscal and educational operation of the district through its administration. As a Type II school district, the board's trustees are elected directly by voters to serve three-year terms of office on a staggered basis, with three seats up for election each year held (since 2012) as part of the November general election. The board appoints a superintendent to oversee the district's day-to-day operations and a business administrator to supervise the business functions of the district.
