= Runnemede Public School District =

School district in Camden County, New Jersey, US

Address
- 505 West Third Avenue Runnemede, Camden County, New Jersey, 08078; United States
- Coordinates: 39.850751°N 75.082162°W

District information
- Grades: PreK-8
- Superintendent: Mark Iannucci
- Business administrator: Sean R. McCarron
- Schools: 3

Students and staff
- Enrollment: 814 (as of 2018–19)
- Faculty: 68.5 FTEs
- Student–teacher ratio: 11.9:1

Other information
- District Factor Group: B
- Website: Official website
Ind.	Per pupil	District spending	Rank (*)	K-8 average	%± vs. average
1A	Total Spending	$14,420	8	$18,891	−23.7%
1	Budgetary Cost	12,885	24	14,159	−9.0%
2	Classroom Instruction	7,861	25	8,659	−9.2%
6	Support Services	2,180	51	2,167	0.6%
8	Administrative Cost	1,490	31	1,547	−3.7%
10	Operations & Maintenance	1,235	14	1,612	−23.4%
13	Extracurricular Activities	91	42	104	−12.5%
16	Median Teacher Salary	51,468	3	61,136
Data from NJDoE 2014 Taxpayers' Guide to Education Spending. *Of K-8 districts with more than 750 students. Lowest spending=1; Highest=84

The Runnemede Public School District is a community public school district that serves students in pre-kindergarten through eighth grade from Runnemede, in Camden County, in the U.S. state of New Jersey.

As of the 2018–19 school year, the district, comprising three schools, had an enrollment of 814 students and 68.5 classroom teachers (on an FTE basis), for a student–teacher ratio of 11.9:1.

The district is classified by the New Jersey Department of Education as being in District Factor Group "B", the second-lowest of eight groupings. District Factor Groups organize districts statewide to allow comparison by common socioeconomic characteristics of the local districts. From lowest socioeconomic status to highest, the categories are A, B, CD, DE, FG, GH, I and J.

For ninth through twelfth grades, public school students attend Triton Regional High School, which also serves students from Bellmawr Borough and Gloucester Township, as one of three high schools that are part of the Black Horse Pike Regional School District. As of the 2018–19 school year, the high school had an enrollment of 1,159 students and 95.5 classroom teachers (on an FTE basis), for a student–teacher ratio of 12.1:1. The two other schools in the district are Highland Regional High School and Timber Creek Regional High School, which serve students from Gloucester Township, based on their address.

== Schools ==
Schools in the district (with 2018–19 enrollment data from the National Center for Education Statistics) are:

Elementary schools

- Aline Bingham Elementary School with 174 students in grades K-3
  - Jade Yezzi, principal
- Grace Downing Elementary School with 167 students in grades K-3
  - Jade Yezzi, principal

Middle school

- Mary E. Volz School with 469 students in grades 4-8
  - Steve Pili, principal

== Administration ==
Core members of the district's administration are:

- Mark Iannucci, superintendent
- Sean R. McCarron, business administrator and board secretary

== Board of education ==
The district's board of education, comprised of nine members, sets policy and oversees the fiscal and educational operation of the district through its administration. As a Type II school district, the board's trustees are elected directly by voters to serve three-year terms of office on a staggered basis, with three seats up for election each year held (since 2012) as part of the November general election. The board appoints a superintendent to oversee the district's day-to-day operations and a business administrator to supervise the business functions of the district.
