= Bellmawr School District =

School district in Camden County, New Jersey, US

Address
- 256 Anderson Avenue Bellmawr, Camden County, New Jersey, 08031; United States
- Coordinates: 39.870561°N 75.090391°W

District information
- Grades: PreK-8
- Superintendent: Danielle Sochor
- Business administrator: Patrick Doyle
- Schools: 3

Students and staff
- Enrollment: 1,183 (as of 2023–24)
- Faculty: 104.0 FTEs
- Student–teacher ratio: 11.4:1

Other information
- District Factor Group: B
- Website: www.bellmawrschools.org
Ind.	Per pupil	District spending	Rank (*)	K-8 average	%± vs. average
1A	Total Spending	$14,126	5	$18,891	−25.2%
1	Budgetary Cost	11,508	10	14,159	−18.7%
2	Classroom Instruction	7,355	10	8,659	−15.1%
6	Support Services	1,899	29	2,167	−12.4%
8	Administrative Cost	1,123	2	1,547	−27.4%
10	Operations & Maintenance	1,044	5	1,612	−35.2%
13	Extracurricular Activities	88	40	104	−15.4%
16	Median Teacher Salary	59,746	30	61,136
Data from NJDoE 2014 Taxpayers' Guide to Education Spending. *Of K-8 districts with more than 750 students. Lowest spending=1; Highest=84

The Bellmawr School District is a community public school district that serves students in pre-kindergarten through eighth grade from Bellmawr, in Camden County, in the U.S. state of New Jersey.

As of the 2023–24 school year, the district, comprised of three schools, had an enrollment of 1,183 students and 104.0 classroom teachers (on an FTE basis), for a student–teacher ratio of 11.4:1.

The district participates in the Interdistrict Public School Choice Program, which allows non-resident students to attend school in the district at no cost to their parents, with tuition covered by the resident district. Available slots are announced annually by grade.

The district had been classified by the New Jersey Department of Education as being in District Factor Group "B", the second lowest of eight groupings. District Factor Groups organize districts statewide to allow comparison by common socioeconomic characteristics of the local districts. From lowest socioeconomic status to highest, the categories are A, B, CD, DE, FG, GH, I and J.

For ninth through twelfth grades, public-school students attend Triton Regional High School in neighboring Runnemede, one of three high schools that are part of the Black Horse Pike Regional School District. The other communities in the district are Gloucester Township and Runnemede. As of the 2023–24 school year, the high school had an enrollment of 1,114 students and 100.0 classroom teachers (on an FTE basis), for a student–teacher ratio of 11.1:1. The two other schools in the district are Highland Regional High School and Timber Creek Regional High School, which serve students from Gloucester Township, based on their address.

== Schools ==
Schools in the district (with 2023–24 enrollment data from the National Center for Education Statistics) are:

Elementary schools

- Bellmawr Park Elementary School with 483 students in grades PreK–4
  - Gina Heller, principal
- Ethel M. Burke Elementary School with 233 students in grades K–4
  - Matthew Maguire, principal

Middle school

- Bell Oaks Middle School with 454 students in grades 5–8
  - Anthony Farinelli, principal

== Administration ==
Core members of the district's administration are:

- Danielle Sochor, superintendent
- Patrick Doyle, business administrator and board secretary

== Board of education ==
The district's board of education is comprised of seven members who set policy and oversee the fiscal and educational operation of the district through its administration. As a Type II school district, the board's trustees are elected directly by voters to serve three-year terms of office on a staggered basis, with either two three seats up for election each year held (since 2012) as part of the November general election. The board appoints a superintendent to oversee the district's day-to-day operations and a business administrator to supervise the business functions of the district.
