= Lawnside School District =

School district in Camden County, New Jersey, US

Address
- 426 Charleston Avenue Lawnside, Camden County, New Jersey, 08045; United States
- Coordinates: 39.86449°N 75.020465°W

District information
- Grades: Pre-K to 8
- Superintendent: Ronn H. Johnson
- Business administrator: Dawn Leary
- Schools: 1

Students and staff
- Enrollment: 347 (as of 2023–24)
- Faculty: 36.0 FTEs
- Student–teacher ratio: 9.6:1

Other information
- District Factor Group: B
- Website: www.lawnside.k12.nj.us
Ind.	Per pupil	District spending	Rank (*)	K-8 average	%± vs. average
1A	Total Spending	$21,619	51	$18,891	14.4%
1	Budgetary Cost	16,354	46	14,159	15.5%
2	Classroom Instruction	9,365	40	8,659	8.2%
6	Support Services	3,400	54	2,167	56.9%
8	Administrative Cost	1,602	33	1,547	3.6%
10	Operations & Maintenance	1,972	47	1,612	22.3%
13	Extracurricular Activities	15	6	104	−85.6%
16	Median Teacher Salary	56,860	30	61,136
Data from NJDoE 2014 Taxpayers' Guide to Education Spending. *Of K-8 districts with up to 400 students. Lowest spending=1; Highest=71

The Lawnside School District is a community public school district that serves students in pre-kindergarten through eighth grade from Lawnside, in Camden County, in the U.S. state of New Jersey.

As of the 2023–24 school year, the district, comprised of one school, had an enrollment of 347 students and 36.0 classroom teachers (on an FTE basis), for a student–teacher ratio of 9.6:1.

The district had been classified by the New Jersey Department of Education as being in District Factor Group "B", the second-lowest of eight groupings. District Factor Groups organize districts statewide to allow comparison by common socioeconomic characteristics of the local districts. From lowest socioeconomic status to highest, the categories are A, B, CD, DE, FG, GH, I and J.

For ninth through twelfth grades, public school students attend Haddon Heights High School, which serves Haddon Heights, and students from the neighboring communities of Barrington, Lawnside and Merchantville, who attend the high school as part of sending/receiving relationships with the Haddon Heights School District. As of the 2023–24 school year, the high school had an enrollment of 942 students and 80.0 classroom teachers (on an FTE basis), for a student–teacher ratio of 11.8:1.

== School ==
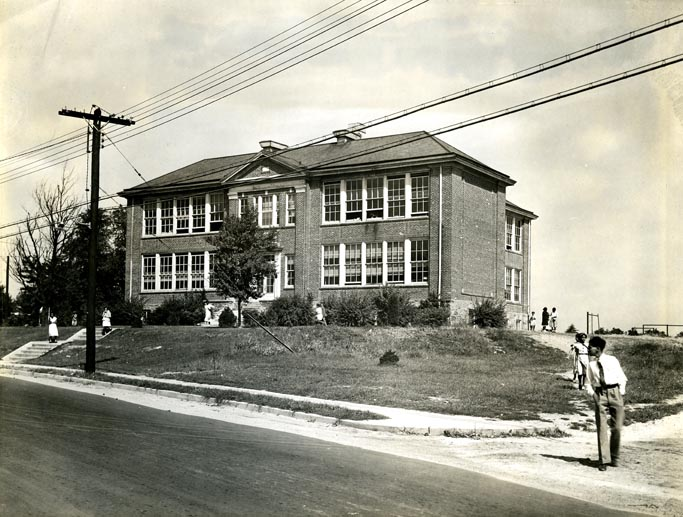
Lawnside schoolhouse c.1940

Lawnside Public School served an enrollment of 342 students in the 2023–24 school year.

== Administration ==
Core members of the district's administration are:

- Ronn H. Johnson, superintendent
- Dawn Leary, business administrator and board secretary

== Board of education ==
The district's board of education, comprised of nine members, sets policy and oversees the fiscal and educational operation of the district through its administration. As a Type II school district, the board's trustees are elected directly by voters to serve three-year terms of office on a staggered basis, with three seats up for election each year held (since 2012) as part of the November general election. The board appoints a superintendent to oversee the district's day-to-day operations and a business administrator to supervise the business functions of the district.
