= Magnolia School District =

Magnolia School District may refer to:

- Magnolia School District (Arkansas)
- Magnolia School District (California)
- Magnolia School District (New Jersey)
