= Eastern Intermediate High School =

Location
- Laurel Oak Road; Voorhees Township, Camden County, New Jersey 08043; 39.8497°N 74.9667°W

Information
- Type: Public high school
- Established: 1992
- Closed: 2012
- Principal: James Talarico
- Faculty: 61 (on FTE basis)
- Grades: 9-10
- Enrollment: 1,093 (as of 2009-10)
- Student to teacher ratio: 17.92:1
- Athletics conference: Olympic Conference

Eastern Intermediate High School was a public high school that served students in grades nine to ten from three communities in Camden County, New Jersey, United States, as part of the Eastern Camden County Regional High School District. The school served students from Berlin Borough, Gibbsboro and Voorhees Township. The high school was located in Voorhees Township. In the past students that finished tenth grade moved on to Eastern High School, (now renamed Eastern Regional High School) for eleventh and twelfth grades. The district was established in 1965, with 35 professional staff and 495 students, and Eastern Intermediate High School was completed in 1992.

As of the 2009-10 school year, the school had an enrollment of 1,063 students and 61 classroom teachers (on an FTE basis), for a student–teacher ratio of 17.92:1. Eastern has a multi-cultural and diverse population with 68.5% White, 14.5% Asian, 9.8% African-American and 4.0% Latino. As a comprehensive secondary school, Eastern was accredited by the New Jersey Department of Education.

The average academic class size was 24. Daily student attendance averaged more than 92.5% and the annual dropout rate was less than 2%.

== Awards, recognition and rankings ==
The school was the 86th-ranked public high school in New Jersey out of 322 schools statewide, in New Jersey Monthly magazine's September 2010 cover story on the state's "Top Public High Schools", after being ranked 79th in 2008 out of 316 schools. The school was ranked 58th in the magazine's September 2006 issue, which included 316 schools across the state. In the September 2008 issue of Philadelphia magazine, Eastern was ranked 32nd among The Top Fifty Public School Districts.

== Administration ==
- Principal - James Talarico

== Noted alumni ==
- Kelly Ripa, co-host of Live! with Kelly and Michael and co-star with Faith Ford, in Hope & Faith
