= Laurel Springs School District =

School district in Camden County, New Jersey, US

Coordinates: 39.822735°N 75.003407°W

- 623 Grand Avenue Laurel Springs, Camden County, New Jersey, 08021

District information
- Grades: PreK-6
- Superintendent: Ryan Mahlman
- Business administrator: Erin Kearney
- Schools: 1

Students and staff
- Enrollment: 188 (as of 2022–23)
- Faculty: 15.8 FTEs
- Student–teacher ratio: 11.9:1

Other information
- District Factor Group: DE
- Website: www.laurelspringschool.org
Ind.	Per pupil	District spending	Rank (*)	K-6 average	%± vs. average
1A	Total Spending	$14,963	6	$18,891	−20.8%
1	Budgetary Cost	13,705	23	13,649	0.4%
2	Classroom Instruction	8,528	24	8,366	1.9%
6	Support Services	2,008	23	2,161	−7.1%
8	Administrative Cost	1,630	31	1,467	11.1%
10	Operations & Maintenance	1,499	25	1,552	−3.4%
13	Extracurricular Activities	18	15	39	−53.8%
16	Median Teacher Salary	57,136	29	57,437
Data from NJDoE 2014 Taxpayers' Guide to Education Spending. *Of K-6 districts with any number of students. Lowest spending=1; Highest=59

The Laurel Springs School District is a community public school district that serves students in pre-kindergarten through sixth grade from Laurel Springs in Camden County, in the U.S. state of New Jersey.

As of the 2022–23 school year, the district, comprising one school, had an enrollment of 188 students and 15.8 classroom teachers (on an FTE basis), for a student–teacher ratio of 11.9:1.

The district is classified by the New Jersey Department of Education as being in District Factor Group "DE", the fifth-highest of eight groupings. District Factor Groups organize districts statewide to allow comparison by common socioeconomic characteristics of the local districts. From lowest socioeconomic status to highest, the categories are A, B, CD, DE, FG, GH, I and J.

For seventh and eighth grades, students from Laurel Springs attend Samuel S. Yellin Elementary School in Stratford as part of a sending/receiving relationship with the Stratford School District. As of the 2021–22 school year, Yellin School had an enrollment of 484 students and 41.5 classroom teachers (on an FTE basis), for a student–teacher ratio of 11.7:1.

For ninth grade through twelfth grade, public school students attend Sterling High School, a regional high school district that also serves students from Magnolia, Somerdale and Stratford, along with the sending districts of Hi-Nella and Laurel Springs. As of the 2021–22 school year, the high school had an enrollment of 897 students and 70.0 classroom teachers (on an FTE basis), for a student–teacher ratio of 12.8:1.

== School ==
- Laurel Spring School had 176 students as of the 2021–22 school year.
  - Ryan Mahlman, principal

== Administration ==
Core members of the district's administration are:

- Ryan Mahlman, superintendent
- Erin Kearney, business administrator and board secretary

== Board of education ==
The district's board of education, comprised of nine members, sets policy and oversees the fiscal and educational operation of the district through its administration. As a Type II school district, the board's trustees are elected directly by voters to serve three-year terms of office on a staggered basis, with three seats up for election each year held (since 2012) as part of the November general election. The board appoints a superintendent to oversee the district's day-to-day operations and a business administrator to supervise the business functions of the district.
