= Gibbsboro School District =

School district in Camden County, New Jersey, US

Address
- 37 Kirkwood Road Gibbsboro, Camden County, New Jersey, 08026; United States
- Coordinates: 39.837517°N 74.968054°W

District information
- Grades: PreK - 8
- Superintendent: Jack Marcellus
- Business administrator: Jim Cordery
- Schools: 1

Students and staff
- Enrollment: 264 (as of 2026–27)
- Faculty: 36.7 FTEs
- Student–teacher ratio: 7.19:1

Other information
- District Factor Group: FG
- Website: www.gibbsboroschool.org
Ind.	Per pupil	District spending	Rank (*)	K-8 average	%± vs. average
1A	Total Spending	$24,341	63	$18,891	28.8%
1	Budgetary Cost	14,648	30	14,159	3.5%
2	Classroom Instruction	9,295	37	8,659	7.3%
6	Support Services	2,289	30	2,167	5.6%
8	Administrative Cost	1,335	7	1,547	−13.7%
10	Operations & Maintenance	1,345	14	1,612	−16.6%
13	Extracurricular Activities	384	62	104	269.2%
16	Median Teacher Salary	55,825	22	61,136
Data from NJDoE 2014 Taxpayers' Guide to Education Spending. *Of K-8 districts with up to 400 students. Lowest spending=1; Highest=71

The Gibbsboro School District is a community public school district that serves students in pre-kindergarten through eighth grade from Gibbsboro, in Camden County, in the U.S. state of New Jersey.

As of the 2026-27 school year, the district (comprised of one school) had an enrollment of 264 students and 36.7 classroom teachers (on an FTE basis), for a student–teacher ratio of 7.19:1.

The district had been classified by the New Jersey Department of Education as being in District Factor Group "FG", the fourth-highest of eight groupings. District Factor Groups organize districts statewide to allow comparison by common socioeconomic characteristics of the local districts. From lowest socioeconomic status to highest, the categories are A, B, CD, DE, FG, GH, I and J.

Public school students in ninth through twelfth grades attend Eastern Regional High School, part of the Eastern Camden County Regional High School District, a limited-purpose, public regional school district that also serves students from the constituent communities of Berlin Borough and Voorhees Township. As of the 2023–24 school year, the high school had an enrollment of 1,898 students and 144.8 classroom teachers (on an FTE basis), for a student–teacher ratio of 13.1:1.

== Awards and recognition ==
The New Jersey Alliance for Social, Emotional and Character Development recognized the Gibbsboro School as 2013 New Jersey School of Character, one of 11 schools in the state to earn the honor. The school was recognized as a National School of Character Finalist in March 2014.

== School ==
The Gibbsboro Public School served a total of 280 students in the 2023–24 school year.

- Jim Cordery, principal

== Administration ==
Core members of the school's administration are:

- Jack Marcellus, superintendent
- Jim Cordery, business administrator

== Board of education ==
The district's board of education is comprised of nine members who set policy and oversee the fiscal and educational operation of the district through its administration. As a Type II school district, the board's trustees are elected directly by voters to serve three-year terms of office on a staggered basis, with three seats up for election each year held (since 2012) as part of the November general election. The board appoints a superintendent to oversee the district's day-to-day operations and a business administrator to supervise the business functions of the district.
