= Berlin Borough School District =

School district in Camden County, New Jersey, US

Address
- 215 South Franklin Avenue Berlin, Camden County, New Jersey, 08009; United States
- Coordinates: 39.797062°N 74.949046°W

District information
- Grades: PreK-8
- Superintendent: Brenda Harring (interim)
- Business administrator: Donna DiLapo
- Schools: 1

Students and staff
- Enrollment: 848 (as of 2023–24)
- Faculty: 77.0 FTEs
- Student–teacher ratio: 11.0:1

Other information
- District Factor Group: DE
- Website: www.bcsberlin.org
| Ind. | Per pupil | District spending | Rank (*) | K-8 average | %± vs. average |
|---|---|---|---|---|---|
| 1A | Total Spending | $13,682 | 3 | $18,891 | −27.6% |
| 1 | Budgetary Cost | 10,400 | 3 | 14,159 | −26.5% |
| 2 | Classroom Instruction | 6,961 | 5 | 8,659 | −19.6% |
| 6 | Support Services | 1,263 | 2 | 2,167 | −41.7% |
| 8 | Administrative Cost | 1,255 | 13 | 1,547 | −18.9% |
| 10 | Operations & Maintenance | 815 | 1 | 1,612 | −49.4% |
| 13 | Extracurricular Activities | 105 | 52 | 104 | 1.0% |
| 16 | Median Teacher Salary | 57,415 | 19 | 61,136 |
Data from NJDoE 2014 Taxpayers' Guide to Education Spending. *Of K-8 districts with more than 750 students. Lowest spending=1; Highest=84

The Berlin Borough School District is a community public school district that serves students in pre-kindergarten through eighth grade from Berlin Borough, in Camden County, in the U.S. state of New Jersey.

As of the 2023–24 school year, the district, comprised of one school, had an enrollment of 848 students and 77.0 classroom teachers (on an FTE basis), for a student–teacher ratio of 11.0:1.

The district had been classified by the New Jersey Department of Education as being in District Factor Group "DE", the fifth-highest of eight groupings. District Factor Groups organize districts statewide to allow comparison by common socioeconomic characteristics of the local districts. From lowest socioeconomic status to highest, the categories are A, B, CD, DE, FG, GH, I and J.

Public school students in ninth through twelfth grades attend the Eastern Camden County Regional High School District, a limited-purpose, public regional school district that serves students at Eastern Regional High School from the constituent communities of Berlin Borough, Gibbsboro and Voorhees Township. As of the 2023–24 school year, the high school had an enrollment of 1,898 students and 144.8 classroom teachers (on an FTE basis), for a student–teacher ratio of 13.1:1.

== History ==
In 1948, during de jure educational segregation in the United States, the district had a school for black children with an outdoor pump and restrooms and two indoor rooms. Noma Jensen of The Journal of Negro Education described the school as being "in bad physical conditions".

== Awards and recognition ==
The New Jersey Alliance for Social, Emotional and Character Development (NJASECD) recognized Berlin Community School as 2012 New Jersey School of Character (NJSOC) - honorable mention.

The district was selected as one of the top "100 Best Communities for Music Education in America 2005" by the American Music Conference.

== Schools ==
Berlin Community School serves grades PreK-8 and had a total of 840 students in grades PreK-8 as of the 2023–24 school year.

- Lindsay Hickman, elementary school principal
- Therese Bonmati, middle school principal

== Administration ==
Core members of the district's administration are:

- Brenda Harring, interim superintendent
- Donna DiLapo, business administrator and board secretary

== Board of education ==
The district's board of education is comprised of nine members who set policy and oversee the fiscal and educational operation of the district through its administration. As a Type II school district, the board's trustees are elected directly by voters to serve three-year terms of office on a staggered basis, with three seats up for election each year held (since 2012) as part of the November general election. The board appoints a superintendent to oversee the district's day-to-day operations and a business administrator to supervise the business functions of the district.
