= Amalthea Cellars =

Winery in Camden County, New Jersey

Coordinates: 39.738343°N 74.886403°W

- Location: 209 Vineyard Road, Atco, NJ, USA
- Coordinates: 39.738343 N, 74.886403 W
- Appellation: Outer Coastal Plain AVA
- First vines planted: 1976
- Opened to the public: 1982
- Key people: Louis Caracciolo (owner)
- Area cultivated: 6
- Cases/yr: 5,000 (2013)
- Other attractions: Picnicking permitted, pet-friendly
- Distribution: On-site, wine festivals, NJ liquor stores, NJ restaurants, home shipment
- Tasting: Tastings Friday to Sunday
- Website: http://amaltheacellars.com

Amalthea Cellars (/ˈæməlˈθiːə/ AM-əl-THEE-ə) is a winery in the West Atco section of Winslow in Camden County, New Jersey, United States. The vineyard was first planted in 1976, and opened to the public in 1981. Amalthea has 10 acres of grapes under cultivation, and produces 5,000 cases of wine per year. The winery is named after Amalthea, a moon of Jupiter, reflecting the owner's scientific background and love of mythology.

== Wines ==
Amalthea Cellars is in the Outer Coastal Plain AVA, and produces wine from Cabernet Franc, Cabernet Sauvignon, Chancellor, Chardonnay, Dolcetto, Merlot, Pinot gris, Rayon d'Or, Riesling, Rkatsiteli, Sauvignon blanc, Syrah, Traminette, Villard blanc, and Viognier grapes. Amalthea also makes fruit wines from blueberries and peaches. It is the only winery in New Jersey that produces wine from Rayon d'Or, which is a white hybrid grape developed in France in the early twentieth century. Amalthea was a participant at the Judgment of Princeton, a wine tasting organized by the American Association of Wine Economists that compared New Jersey wines to premium French vintages.

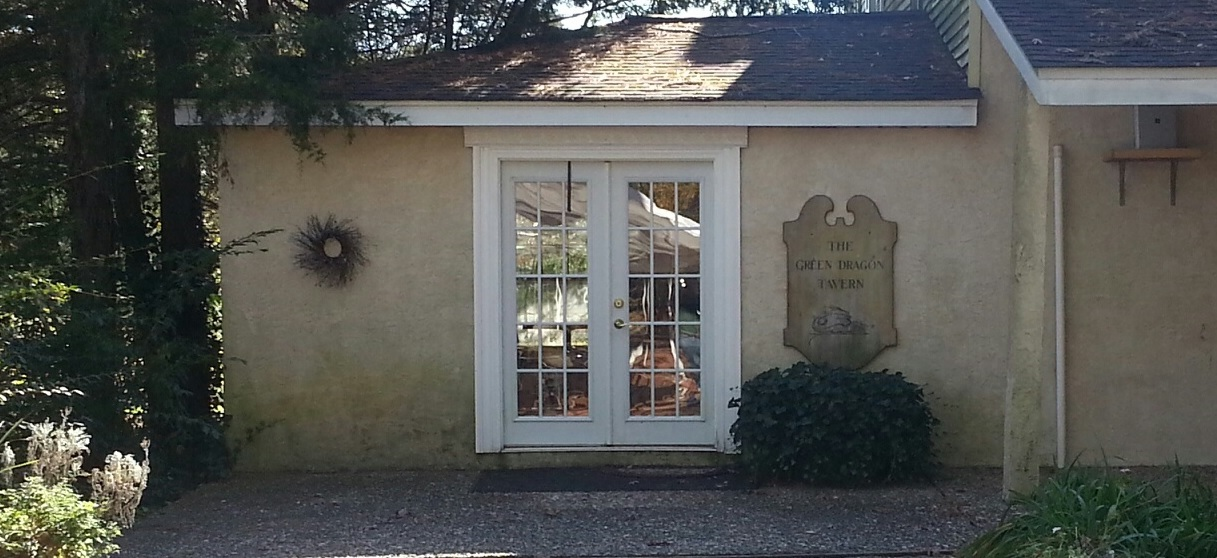
Amalthea's Green Dragon Tavern was named after a historic Boston bar, and is now used for special events.

== Advocacy, licensing, and associations ==
The winery advocates traditional winemaking techniques, and uses egg whites, sulfur, and oak barrels to produce its wine. Amalthea has a plenary winery license from the New Jersey Division of Alcoholic Beverage Control, which allows it to produce an unrestricted amount of wine, operate up to 15 off-premises sales rooms, and ship up to 12 cases per year to consumers in-state or out-of-state. Amalthea is a member of the Garden State Wine Growers Association and the Outer Coastal Plain Vineyard Association.

== See also ==
- Alcohol laws of New Jersey
- American wine
- Judgment of Princeton
- List of wineries, breweries, and distilleries in New Jersey
- New Jersey Farm Winery Act
- New Jersey Wine Industry Advisory Council
- New Jersey wine
