= Greentree, New Jersey =

Populated place in Camden County, New Jersey, US

- Census-designated place
- Map of Greentree CDP in Camden County. Inset: Location of Camden County within New Jersey.

- Location in Camden County Location in New Jersey Location in the United States
- Coordinates: 39.898668°N 74.96168°W
- Country: United States
- State: New Jersey
- County: Camden
- Township: Cherry Hill

Area
  - Total: 4.66 sq mi (12.07 km^{2})
  - Land: 4.65 sq mi (12.05 km^{2})
  - Water: 0.0077 sq mi (0.02 km^{2}) 0.16%
- Elevation: 89 ft (27 m)

Population (2020)
  - Total: 12,012
  - Density: 2,582.7/sq mi (997.17/km^{2})
- Time zone: UTC−05:00 (Eastern (EST))
  - Summer (DST): UTC−04:00 (EDT)
- Area code: 856
- FIPS code: 34-27995
- GNIS feature ID: 02389878

Greentree is an unincorporated community and census-designated place (CDP) located within Cherry Hill Township, in Camden County, in the U.S. state of New Jersey. As of the 2020 census, Greentree had a population of 12,012.

== Geography ==
According to the United States Census Bureau, the Greentree CDP had a total area of 4.666 square miles (12.08 km^{2}), including 4.659 square miles (12.07 km^{2}) of land and 0.007 square miles (0.018 km^{2}) of water (0.16%).

== Demographics ==
Historical population
Census	Pop.	Note	%±
2000	11,536		—
2010	11,367		−1.5%
2020	12,012		5.7%
Population sources: 2000; 2010 2020

Greentree first appeared as a census designated place in the 2000 U.S. census created from part of the deleted Cherry Hill CDP.

=== Racial and ethnic composition ===
Greentree CDP, New Jersey – Racial and ethnic composition Note: the US Census treats Hispanic/Latino as an ethnic category. This table excludes Latinos from the racial categories and assigns them to a separate category. Hispanics/Latinos may be of any race.
Race / Ethnicity (NH = Non-Hispanic)	Pop 2000	Pop 2010	Pop 2020	% 2000	% 2010	% 2020
White alone (NH)	8,806	8,139	7,577	76.33%	71.60%	63.08%
Black or African American alone (NH)	675	721	792	5.85%	6.34%	6.59%
Native American or Alaska Native alone (NH)	6	8	4	0.05%	0.07%	0.03%
Asian alone (NH)	1,703	1,960	2,552	14.76%	17.24%	21.25%
Native Hawaiian or Pacific Islander alone (NH)	2	0	8	0.02%	0.00%	0.07%
Other race alone (NH)	6	16	62	0.05%	0.14%	0.52%
Mixed race or Multiracial (NH)	102	178	383	0.88%	1.57%	3.19%
Hispanic or Latino (any race)	236	345	634	2.05%	3.04%	5.28%
Total	11,536	11,367	12,012	100.00%	100.00%	100.00%

=== 2020 census ===
As of the 2020 census, Greentree had a population of 12,012. The median age was 42.5 years. 23.2% of residents were under the age of 18 and 18.6% of residents were 65 years of age or older. For every 100 females there were 93.1 males, and for every 100 females age 18 and over there were 90.8 males age 18 and over.

100.0% of residents lived in urban areas, while 0.0% lived in rural areas.

There were 4,333 households in Greentree, of which 36.0% had children under the age of 18 living in them. Of all households, 61.9% were married-couple households, 12.6% were households with a male householder and no spouse or partner present, and 22.1% were households with a female householder and no spouse or partner present. About 20.2% of all households were made up of individuals and 9.6% had someone living alone who was 65 years of age or older.

There were 4,529 housing units, of which 4.3% were vacant. The homeowner vacancy rate was 0.8% and the rental vacancy rate was 9.0%.

=== 2010 census ===
The 2010 United States census counted 11,367 people, 4,007 households, and 3,218 families in the CDP. The population density was 2,439.8 people per square mile (942.0 people/km^{2}). There were 4,134 housing units at an average density of 887.3 units per square mile (342.6 units/km^{2}). The racial makeup was 73.52% (8,357) White, 6.54% (743) Black or African American, 0.08% (9) Native American, 17.34% (1,971) Asian, 0.00% (0) Pacific Islander, 0.65% (74) from other races, and 1.87% (213) from two or more races. Hispanic or Latino of any race were 3.04% (345) of the population.

Of the 4,007 households, 37.8% had children under the age of 18; 67.0% were married couples living together; 10.0% had a female householder with no husband present and 19.7% were non-families. Of all households, 17.2% were made up of individuals and 8.0% had someone living alone who was 65 years of age or older. The average household size was 2.83 and the average family size was 3.21.

25.9% of the population were under the age of 18, 6.4% from 18 to 24, 21.8% from 25 to 44, 31.3% from 45 to 64, and 14.5% who were 65 years of age or older. The median age was 42.2 years. For every 100 females, the population had 93.2 males. For every 100 females ages 18 and older there were 91.1 males.

=== 2000 census ===
As of the 2000 United States census there were 11,536 people, 3,883 households, and 3,253 families living in the CDP. The population density was 953.8 people/km^{2} (2,470 people/mi^{2}). There were 4,009 housing units at an average density of 331.5 units/km^{2} (859 units/mi^{2}). The racial makeup of the CDP was 77.51% White, 6.05% African American, 0.07% Native American, 14.82% Asian, 0.02% Pacific Islander, 0.55% from other races, and 0.98% from two or more races. Hispanic or Latino of any race were 2.05% of the population.

There were 3,883 households, out of which 41.3% had children under the age of 18 living with them, 73.6% were married couples living together, 8.0% had a female householder with no husband present, and 16.2% were non-families. 13.8% of all households were made up of individuals, and 5.6% had someone living alone who was 65 years of age or older. The average household size was 2.94 and the average family size was 3.25.

In the CDP the population was spread out, with 27.4% under the age of 18, 5.8% from 18 to 24, 26.2% from 25 to 44, 29.7% from 45 to 64, and 10.9% who were 65 years of age or older. The median age was 40 years. For every 100 females there were 94.6 males. For every 100 females age 18 and over, there were 90.6 males.

The median income for a household in the CDP was $85,816, and the median income for a family was $94,635. Males had a median income of $67,738 versus $39,896 for females. The per capita income for the CDP was $34,371. About 1.0% of families and 2.2% of the population were below the poverty line, including 1.7% of those under age 18 and 2.4% of those age 65 or over.
