= Haddonfield Public Schools =

School district in Camden County, New Jersey, US

Address
- One Lincoln Avenue Haddonfield, Camden County, New Jersey, 08033; United States
- Coordinates: 39.89579°N 75.039509°W

District information
- Grades: PreK-12
- Superintendent: Chuck Klaus
- Business administrator: Michael Catalano
- Schools: 5

Students and staff
- Enrollment: 2,766 (as of 2022–23)
- Faculty: 209.5 FTEs
- Student–teacher ratio: 13.2:1

Other information
- District Factor Group: J
- Website: haddonfieldschools.org
| Ind. | Per pupil | District spending | Rank (*) | K-12 average | %± vs. average |
|---|---|---|---|---|---|
| 1A | Total Spending | $15,344 | 7 | $18,891 | −18.8% |
| 1 | Budgetary Cost | 12,281 | 11 | 14,783 | −16.9% |
| 2 | Classroom Instruction | 7,572 | 18 | 8,763 | −13.6% |
| 6 | Support Services | 1,560 | 3 | 2,392 | −34.8% |
| 8 | Administrative Cost | 1,205 | 4 | 1,485 | −18.9% |
| 10 | Operations & Maintenance | 1,430 | 21 | 1,783 | −19.8% |
| 13 | Extracurricular Activities | 474 | 52 | 268 | 76.9% |
| 16 | Median Teacher Salary | 56,762 | 12 | 64,043 |
Data from NJDoE 2014 Taxpayers' Guide to Education Spending. *Of K-12 districts with 1,800-3,500 students. Lowest spending=1; Highest=68

The Haddonfield Public Schools is a comprehensive community public school district serving students in pre-kindergarten through twelfth grade in Haddonfield, in Camden County, in the U.S. state of New Jersey.

As of the 2022–23 school year, the district, comprising five schools, had an enrollment of 2,766 students and 209.5 classroom teachers (on an FTE basis), for a student–teacher ratio of 13.2:1.

The district is classified by the New Jersey Department of Education as being in District Factor Group "J", the highest of eight groupings. District Factor Groups organize districts statewide to allow comparison by common socioeconomic characteristics of the local districts. From lowest socioeconomic status to highest, the categories are A, B, CD, DE, FG, GH, I and J.

The district serves students from the Borough of Haddonfield, along with those from Tavistock who attend the district's schools as part of sending/receiving relationships. The schools are funded through local property taxes. While most students are residents, a small number of students are enrolled on a tuition or voucher basis.

Each elementary school has approximately three sections in each grade; most students walk to school. The middle school serves grades 6–8. Several world language courses are offered in German, French and Spanish, while some students take supplemental reading classes. Over 20 co- and extra-curricular programs including our GSA, Diplomats for Diversity, or Technology Club are offered.

== History ==
In 1948, during de jure educational segregation in the United States, children of all races attended the same school, but white and black children were put in separate classes for grades 1–4.

== Awards, recognition and rankings ==
In 2023, J. Fithian Tatem Elementary School was one of nine schools in New Jersey that was recognized as a National Blue Ribbon School by the United States Department of Education.

In 2015, Elizabeth Haddon School was one of 15 schools in New Jersey, and one of nine public schools, recognized as a National Blue Ribbon School in the exemplary high performing category.

During the 2004–05 school year, Haddonfield Memorial High School was awarded the National Blue Ribbon School Award of Excellence by the United States Department of Education, the highest award an American school can receive.

== Schools ==
Schools in the district (with 2022–23 enrollment data from the National Center for Education Statistics) are:

Elementary schools

- Central Elementary School with 437 students in grades PreK-5
  - Shannon Simkus, principal
- Elizabeth Haddon Elementary School with 376 students in grades PreK-5
  - Gerry Bissinger, principal
- J. Fithian Tatem Elementary School with 432 students in grades PreK-5
  - Donnetta Beatty, principal

Middle school

- Haddonfield Middle School with 647 students in grades 6–8
  - Mike McHale, principal

High school

- Haddonfield Memorial High School with 866 students in grades 9–12
  - Tammy McHale, principal

== Administration ==
Core members of the district's administration are:

- Chuck Klaus, superintendent
- Michael Catalano, business administrator / board secretary

== Board of education ==
The district's board of education, comprised of nine members, sets policy and oversees the fiscal and educational operation of the district through its administration. As a Type II school district, the board's trustees are elected directly by voters to serve three-year terms of office on a staggered basis, with three seats up for election each year held (since 2012) as part of the November general election. The board appoints a superintendent to oversee the district's day-to-day operations and a business administrator to supervise the business functions of the district. In addition to their work on the board as a whole, each board member chairs a three-member committee which meets throughout the year to discuss specific issues. Major board committees include finance, student life, buildings and grounds, and communications.
