= Springdale, New Jersey =

Populated place in Camden County, New Jersey, US

- Census-designated place
- Map of Springdale highlighted within Camden County. Right: Location of Camden County in New Jersey.

- Location in Camden County Location in New Jersey Location in the United States
- Coordinates: 39.876188°N 74.972145°W
- Country: United States
- State: New Jersey
- County: Camden
- Township: Cherry Hill

Area
  - Total: 5.35 sq mi (13.86 km^{2})
  - Land: 5.35 sq mi (13.85 km^{2})
  - Water: 0.0039 sq mi (0.01 km^{2}) 0.08%
- Elevation: 59 ft (18 m)

Population (2020)
  - Total: 14,811
  - Density: 2,769.1/sq mi (1,069.14/km^{2})
- Time zone: UTC−05:00 (Eastern (EST))
  - Summer (DST): UTC−04:00 (EDT)
- Area code: 856
- FIPS code: 34-69900
- GNIS feature ID: 02390337

Springdale is an unincorporated community and census-designated place (CDP) located within Cherry Hill Township, in Camden County, in the U.S. state of New Jersey. As of the 2020 census, Springdale had a population of 14,811.

== Geography ==
According to the United States Census Bureau, the CDP had a total area of 5.353 square miles (13.86 km^{2}), including 5.349 square miles (13.85 km^{2}) of land and 0.004 square miles (0.010 km^{2}) of water (0.08%).

== Demographics ==
Historical population
Census	Pop.	Note	%±
2000	14,409		—
2010	14,518		0.8%
2020	14,811		2.0%
Population sources: 1950 1960 1970; 1980 1990 2000; 2010

Springdale first appeared as a census designated place in the 2000 U.S. census created from part of the deleted Cherry Hill CDP.

=== Racial and ethnic composition ===
Springdale CDP, New Jersey – Racial and ethnic composition Note: the US Census treats Hispanic/Latino as an ethnic category. This table excludes Latinos from the racial categories and assigns them to a separate category. Hispanics/Latinos may be of any race.
Race / Ethnicity (NH = Non-Hispanic)	Pop 2000	Pop 2010	Pop 2020	% 2000	% 2010	% 2020
White alone (NH)	12,492	11,779	10,513	86.70%	81.13%	70.98%
Black or African American alone (NH)	345	494	695	2.39%	3.40%	4.69%
Native American or Alaska Native alone (NH)	7	10	1	0.05%	0.07%	0.01%
Asian alone (NH)	1,299	1,659	2,216	9.02%	11.43%	14.96%
Native Hawaiian or Pacific Islander alone (NH)	1	2	0	0.01%	0.01%	0.00%
Other race alone (NH)	5	12	69	0.03%	0.08%	0.47%
Mixed race or Multiracial (NH)	84	225	474	0.58%	1.55%	3.20%
Hispanic or Latino (any race)	176	337	843	1.22%	2.32%	5.69%
Total	14,409	14,518	14,811	100.00%	100.00%	100.00%

=== 2020 census ===
As of the 2020 census, Springdale had a population of 14,811. The median age was 45.7 years. 22.6% of residents were under the age of 18 and 22.7% of residents were 65 years of age or older. For every 100 females there were 93.7 males, and for every 100 females age 18 and over there were 90.0 males age 18 and over.

100.0% of residents lived in urban areas, while 0.0% lived in rural areas.

There were 5,343 households in Springdale, of which 34.5% had children under the age of 18 living in them. Of all households, 65.5% were married-couple households, 10.4% were households with a male householder and no spouse or partner present, and 20.9% were households with a female householder and no spouse or partner present. About 20.3% of all households were made up of individuals and 12.4% had someone living alone who was 65 years of age or older.

There were 5,565 housing units, of which 4.0% were vacant. The homeowner vacancy rate was 1.2% and the rental vacancy rate was 7.1%.

=== 2010 census ===
The 2010 United States census counted 14,518 people, 5,230 households, and 4,121 families in the CDP. The population density was 2,714.3 people per square mile (1,048.0 people/km^{2}). There were 5,434 housing units at an average density of 1,015.9 units per square mile (392.2 units/km^{2}). The racial makeup was 82.80% (12,021) White, 3.51% (509) Black or African American, 0.07% (10) Native American, 11.45% (1,662) Asian, 0.01% (2) Pacific Islander, 0.44% (64) from other races, and 1.72% (250) from two or more races. Hispanic or Latino of any race were 2.32% (337) of the population.

Of the 5,230 households, 35.3% had children under the age of 18; 69.8% were married couples living together; 6.7% had a female householder with no husband present and 21.2% were non-families. Of all households, 18.8% were made up of individuals and 10.9% had someone living alone who was 65 years of age or older. The average household size was 2.70 and the average family size was 3.09.

24.5% of the population were under the age of 18, 5.4% from 18 to 24, 19.2% from 25 to 44, 31.8% from 45 to 64, and 19.0% who were 65 years of age or older. The median age was 45.5 years. For every 100 females, the population had 92.4 males. For every 100 females ages 18 and older there were 88.3 males.

=== 2000 census ===
As of the 2000 United States census there were 14,409 people, 5,186 households, and 4,138 families living in the CDP. The population density was 1,032.2 people/km^{2} (2,673 people/mi^{2}). There were 5,318 housing units at an average density of 380.9 units/km^{2} (987 units/mi^{2}). The racial makeup of the CDP was 87.72% White, 2.40% African American, 0.05% Native American, 9.04% Asian, 0.01% Pacific Islander, 0.11% from other races, and 0.68% from two or more races. Hispanic or Latino of any race were 1.22% of the population.

There were 5,186 households, out of which 35.9% had children under the age of 18 living with them, 72.0% were married couples living together, 5.8% had a female householder with no husband present, and 20.2% were non-families. 17.7% of all households were made up of individuals, and 8.7% had someone living alone who was 65 years of age or older. The average household size was 2.69 and the average family size was 3.06.

In the CDP the population was spread out, with 24.4% under the age of 18, 4.7% from 18 to 24, 23.2% from 25 to 44, 32.2% from 45 to 64, and 15.5% who were 65 years of age or older. The median age was 44 years. For every 100 females there were 91.8 males. For every 100 females age 18 and over, there were 86.9 males.

The median income for a household in the CDP was $96,412, and the median income for a family was $107,496. Males had a median income of $71,638 versus $42,247 for females. The per capita income for the CDP was $43,752. About 1.8% of families and 3.6% of the population were below the poverty line, including 2.7% of those under age 18 and 9.4% of those age 65 or over.
