= Dave Miller (baseball) =

David Robert Miller (born August 25, 1966) is the former bullpen coach for the Cleveland Indians of Major League Baseball.

Miller was born in Woodbury, New Jersey and grew up in Gloucester Township, New Jersey, where he attended Highland Regional High School. He attended Camden County College where he was recognized as a Junior College All American in 1986. He was drafted by the Baltimore Orioles as a pitcher in the 1st round (3rd overall) of the 1986 MLB January Draft-Secondary Phase. He played in the Orioles organization until he retired after the 1992 season. He joined the Indians organization in 1993, serving as a minor league pitching coach for seven seasons, amateur scout for two years in NC-SC-VA, advance scout and spent 10 years working as the Indians minor league pitching coordinator prior to being hired as the Indians bullpen coach following the 2011 season. Miller currently holds the position of player acquisition scout for the Cleveland Guardians.
