= Golden Triangle, New Jersey =

Populated place in Camden County, New Jersey, US

- Census-designated place
- Map of Golden Triangle CDP in Camden County. Inset: Location of Camden County within New Jersey.

- Location in Camden County Location in New Jersey Location in the United States
- Coordinates: 39.93289°N 75.03975°W
- Country: United States
- State: New Jersey
- County: Camden
- Township: Cherry Hill

Area
  - Total: 2.91 sq mi (7.54 km^{2})
  - Land: 2.83 sq mi (7.32 km^{2})
  - Water: 0.089 sq mi (0.23 km^{2}) 3.79%
- Elevation: 26 ft (8 m)

Population (2020)
  - Total: 4,769
  - Density: 1,687.7/sq mi (651.64/km^{2})
- Time zone: UTC−05:00 (Eastern (EST))
  - Summer (DST): UTC−04:00 (EDT)
- Area code: 856
- FIPS code: 3426902
- GNIS feature ID: 02389860

Golden Triangle is an unincorporated community and census-designated place (CDP) located within Cherry Hill, in Camden, in the U.S. state of New Jersey. As of the 2020 census, Golden Triangle had a population of 4,769.

Golden Triangle is roughly bordered by Chapel Avenue, Cuthbert Boulevard, Cooper Landing Road, and Route 70/Marlton Pike.

== Geography ==
According to the United States Census Bureau, the CDP had a total area of 2.949 square miles (7.64 km^{2}), including 2.837 square miles (7.35 km^{2}) of land and 0.112 square miles (0.29 km^{2}) of water (3.79%).

== Demographics ==
Historical population
Census	Pop.	Note	%±
2000	3,511		—
2010	4,145		18.1%
2020	4,769		15.1%
Population sources: 2000; 2010 2020

Golden Triangle first appeared as a census designated place in the 2000 U.S. census created from part of the deleted Cherry Hill CDP.

=== Racial and ethnic composition ===
Golden Triangle CDP, New Jersey – Racial and ethnic composition Note: the US Census treats Hispanic/Latino as an ethnic category. This table excludes Latinos from the racial categories and assigns them to a separate category. Hispanics/Latinos may be of any race.
Race / Ethnicity (NH = Non-Hispanic)	Pop 2000	Pop 2010	Pop 2020	% 2000	% 2010	% 2020
White alone (NH)	2,759	2,764	2,802	78.58%	66.68%	58.75%
Black or African American alone (NH)	308	417	497	8.77%	10.06%	10.42%
Native American or Alaska Native alone (NH)	5	10	0	0.14%	0.24%	0.00%
Asian alone (NH)	180	394	630	5.13%	9.51%	13.21%
Native Hawaiian or Pacific Islander alone (NH)	0	5	0	0.00%	0.12%	0.00%
Other race alone (NH)	0	5	23	0.00%	0.12%	0.48%
Mixed race or Multiracial (NH)	66	74	187	1.88%	1.79%	3.92%
Hispanic or Latino (any race)	193	476	630	5.50%	11.48%	13.21%
Total	3,511	4,145	4,769	100.00%	100.00%	100.00%

=== 2020 census ===
As of the 2020 census, Golden Triangle had a population of 4,769. The median age was 43.7 years. 17.6% of residents were under the age of 18 and 22.6% of residents were 65 years of age or older. For every 100 females there were 87.0 males, and for every 100 females age 18 and over there were 86.0 males age 18 and over.

100.0% of residents lived in urban areas, while 0.0% lived in rural areas.

There were 2,005 households in Golden Triangle, of which 25.0% had children under the age of 18 living in them. Of all households, 42.5% were married-couple households, 20.1% were households with a male householder and no spouse or partner present, and 31.0% were households with a female householder and no spouse or partner present. About 34.0% of all households were made up of individuals and 15.3% had someone living alone who was 65 years of age or older.

There were 2,243 housing units, of which 10.6% were vacant. The homeowner vacancy rate was 1.7% and the rental vacancy rate was 14.2%.

=== 2010 census ===
The 2010 United States census counted 4,145 people, 1,665 households, and 1,002 families in the CDP. The population density was 1,461.2 people per square mile (564.2 people/km^{2}). There were 1,826 housing units at an average density of 643.7 units per square mile (248.5 units/km^{2}). The racial makeup was 71.34% (2,957) White, 10.59% (439) Black or African American, 0.24% (10) Native American, 9.53% (395) Asian, 0.12% (5) Pacific Islander, 5.31% (220) from other races, and 2.87% (119) from two or more races. Hispanic or Latino of any race were 11.48% (476) of the population.

Of the 1,665 households, 24.0% had children under the age of 18; 43.5% were married couples living together; 11.5% had a female householder with no husband present and 39.8% were non-families. Of all households, 34.2% were made up of individuals and 13.4% had someone living alone who was 65 years of age or older. The average household size was 2.43 and the average family size was 3.19.

20.6% of the population were under the age of 18, 7.1% from 18 to 24, 26.9% from 25 to 44, 27.3% from 45 to 64, and 18.1% who were 65 years of age or older. The median age was 41.3 years. For every 100 females, the population had 91.9 males. For every 100 females ages 18 and older there were 87.5 males.

=== 2000 census ===
As of the 2000 United States census there were 3,511 people, 1,358 households, and 862 families living in the CDP. The population density was 474.0 people/km^{2} (1,228 people/mi^{2}). There were 1,457 housing units at an average density of 196.7 units/km^{2} (509 units/mi^{2}). The racial makeup of the CDP was 80.75% White, 9.40% African American, 0.14% Native American, 5.16% Asian, 2.08% from other races, and 2.48% from two or more races. Hispanic or Latino of any race were 5.50% of the population.

There were 1,358 households, out of which 24.0% had children under the age of 18 living with them, 47.2% were married couples living together, 11.5% had a female householder with no husband present, and 36.5% were non-families. 30.8% of all households were made up of individuals, and 12.7% had someone living alone who was 65 years of age or older. The average household size was 2.43 and the average family size was 3.09.

In the CDP the population was spread out, with 19.3% under the age of 18, 6.4% from 18 to 24, 31.2% from 25 to 44, 22.4% from 45 to 64, and 20.8% who were 65 years of age or older. The median age was 41 years. For every 100 females there were 96.3 males. For every 100 females age 18 and over, there were 92.2 males.

The median income for a household in the CDP was $46,266, and the median income for a family was $57,583. Males had a median income of $34,726 versus $31,563 for females. The per capita income for the CDP was $22,423. About 4.6% of families and 7.7% of the population were below the poverty line, including 6.6% of those under age 18 and 5.7% of those age 65 or over.
