= Somerdale School District =

School district in Camden County, New Jersey, US

Address
- 301 Grace Street Somerdale, Camden County, New Jersey, 08083; United States
- Coordinates: 39°50′31″N 75°01′36″W

District information
- Grades: PreK-8
- Superintendent: Rob Ford
- Business administrator: Bruno Berenato
- Schools: 1

Students and staff
- Enrollment: 447 (as of 2022–23)
- Faculty: 43.5 FTEs
- Student–teacher ratio: 10.3:1

Other information
- District Factor Group: CD
- Website: www.somerdale-park.org
Ind.	Per pupil	District spending	Rank (*)	K-8 average	%± vs. average
1A	Total Spending	$15,472	6	$18,891	−18.1%
1	Budgetary Cost	12,326	13	14,159	−12.9%
2	Classroom Instruction	8,229	25	8,659	−5.0%
6	Support Services	1,532	11	2,167	−29.3%
8	Administrative Cost	1,392	10	1,547	−10.0%
10	Operations & Maintenance	1,100	9	1,612	−31.8%
13	Extracurricular Activities	72	17	104	−30.8%
16	Median Teacher Salary	53,394	10	61,136
Data from NJDoE 2014 Taxpayers' Guide to Education Spending. *Of K-8 districts with 401-750 students. Lowest spending=1; Highest=64

The Somerdale School District is a community public school district that serves students in pre-kindergarten through eighth grade from Somerdale, in Camden County, in the U.S. state of New Jersey.

As of the 2022–23 school year, the district, comprised of one school, had an enrollment of 447 students and 43.5 classroom teachers (on an FTE basis), for a student–teacher ratio of 10.3:1.

The district is classified by the New Jersey Department of Education as being in District Factor Group "CD", the sixth-highest of eight groupings. District Factor Groups organize districts statewide to allow comparison by common socioeconomic characteristics of the local districts. From lowest socioeconomic status to highest, the categories are A, B, CD, DE, FG, GH, I and J.

For ninth grade through twelfth grade, public school students attend Sterling High School. This regional high school district that also serves students from Magnolia and Stratford, along with the sending districts of Hi-Nella and Laurel Springs, who attend as part of sending/receiving relationships. The high school is located in Somerdale. As of the 2022–23 school year, the high school had an enrollment of 894 students and 70.0 classroom teachers (on an FTE basis), for a student–teacher ratio of 12.8:1.

== School ==
Somerdale Park School served an enrollment of 445 students (based on 2022–23 enrollment data from the National Center for Education Statistics).

== Administration ==
Core members of the district's administration are:

- Rob Ford, superintendent
- Bruno Berenato, business administrator and board secretary

== Board of education ==
The district's board of education is comprised of nine members who set policy and oversee the fiscal and educational operation of the district through its administration. As a Type II school district, the board's trustees are elected directly by voters to serve three-year terms of office on a staggered basis, with three seats up for election each year held (since 2012) as part of the November general election. The board appoints a superintendent to oversee the district's day-to-day operations and a business administrator to supervise the business functions of the district.

- Marc Ritz, President
- Barbara Boyle, Vice President
