= Magnolia School District (New Jersey) =

School district in Camden County, New Jersey, US

Address
- 420 North Warwick Road Magnolia, Camden County, New Jersey, 08049
- Coordinates: 39.857985°N 75.03332°W

District information
- Grades: PreK to 8
- Superintendent: Warren Pross
- Business administrator: Greg Gontowski
- Schools: 1

Students and staff
- Enrollment: 399 (as of 2022–23)
- Faculty: 40.1 FTEs
- Student–teacher ratio: 9.9:1

Other information
- District Factor Group: CD
- Website: www.magnoliaschools.org
Ind.	Per pupil	District spending	Rank (*)	K-8 average	%± vs. average
1A	Total Spending	$16,100	8	$18,891	−14.8%
1	Budgetary Cost	15,470	41	14,159	9.3%
2	Classroom Instruction	9,885	49	8,659	14.2%
6	Support Services	2,065	23	2,167	−4.7%
8	Administrative Cost	1,788	48	1,547	15.6%
10	Operations & Maintenance	1,570	24	1,612	−2.6%
13	Extracurricular Activities	163	39	104	56.7%
16	Median Teacher Salary	66,507	62	61,136
Data from NJDoE 2014 Taxpayers' Guide to Education Spending. *Of K-8 districts with up to 400 students. Lowest spending=1; Highest=71

The Magnolia School District is a community public school district that serves students in pre-kindergarten through eighth grade in Magnolia, in Camden County, in the U.S. state of New Jersey.

As of the 2022–23 school year, the district, comprising one school, had an enrollment of 399 students and 40.1 classroom teachers (on an FTE basis), for a student–teacher ratio of 9.9:1.

The district is classified by the New Jersey Department of Education as being in District Factor Group "CD", the sixth-highest of eight groupings. District Factor Groups organize districts statewide to allow comparison by common socioeconomic characteristics of the local districts. From lowest socioeconomic status to highest, the categories are A, B, CD, DE, FG, GH, I and J.

For ninth grade through twelfth grade, public school students attend Sterling High School, a regional high school district that also serves students from Somerdale and Stratford, along with the sending districts of Hi-Nella and Laurel Springs. The high school is located in Somerdale. As of the 2018–19 school year, the high school had an enrollment of 958 students and 69.8 classroom teachers (on an FTE basis), for a student–teacher ratio of 13.7:1.

== School ==
The Magnolia School had an enrollment of 419 students in the 2017-18 school year.

- Paul Sorrentino, principal

== Administration ==
Core members of the district's administration are:

- Karen Macpherson, superintendent
- Greg Gontowski, board secretary / School Business Administrator

== Board of education ==
The district's board of education, composed of nine members, sets policy and oversees the fiscal and educational operation of the district through its administration. As a Type II school district, the board's trustees are elected directly by voters to serve three-year terms of office on a staggered basis, with either one or two seats up for election each year held (since 2012) as part of the November general election. The board appoints a superintendent to oversee the district's day-to-day operations and a business administrator to supervise the business functions of the district.
