= Stratford School District =

School district in Camden County, New Jersey, US

Address
- 111 Warwick Road Stratford, Camden County, New Jersey, 08084; United States
- Coordinates: 39.830521°N 75.013857°W

District information
- Grades: PreK-8
- Superintendent: Renee D. Egan
- Business administrator: Debra Trasatti
- Schools: 2

Students and staff
- Enrollment: 901 (as of 2022–23)
- Faculty: 78.0 FTEs
- Student–teacher ratio: 11.6:1

Other information
- District Factor Group: DE
- Website: www.stratford.k12.nj.us
Ind.	Per pupil	District spending	Rank (*)	K-8 average	%± vs. average
1A	Total Spending	$16,324	25	$18,891	−13.6%
1	Budgetary Cost	12,855	22	14,159	−9.2%
2	Classroom Instruction	7,697	20	8,659	−11.1%
6	Support Services	1,831	23	2,167	−15.5%
8	Administrative Cost	1,641	50	1,547	6.1%
10	Operations & Maintenance	1,443	35	1,612	−10.5%
13	Extracurricular Activities	124	69	104	19.2%
16	Median Teacher Salary	57,417	20	61,136
Data from NJDoE 2014 Taxpayers' Guide to Education Spending. *Of K-8 districts with more than 750 students. Lowest spending=1; Highest=84

The Stratford School District is a community public school district that serves students in pre-kindergarten through eighth grade from Stratford in Camden County, in the U.S. state of New Jersey. Students from Laurel Springs attend the district's schools for grades 7 and 8 as part of a sending/receiving relationship. Students from Hi-Nella attend the district for PreK-8 as part of a sending/receiving relationship, under a five-year transition that started in 2012-13, bringing in an additional 100 students to the district.

As of the 2022–23 school year, the district, comprised of two schools, had an enrollment of 901 students and 78.0 classroom teachers (on an FTE basis), for a student–teacher ratio of 11.6:1.

The district is classified by the New Jersey Department of Education as being in District Factor Group "DE", the fifth-highest of eight groupings. District Factor Groups organize districts statewide to allow comparison by common socioeconomic characteristics of the local districts. From lowest socioeconomic status to highest, the categories are A, B, CD, DE, FG, GH, I and J.

For ninth grade through twelfth grade, public school students attend Sterling High School, a regional high school district that also serves students from Magnolia and Somerdale, along with the sending districts of Hi-Nella and Laurel Springs. The high school is located in Somerdale. As of the 2022–23 school year, the high school had an enrollment of 894 students and 70.0 classroom teachers (on an FTE basis), for a student–teacher ratio of 12.8:1.

== Awards and recognition ==
Samuel S. Yellin School was recognized by Governor Jim McGreevey in 2003 as one of 25 schools selected statewide for the First Annual Governor's School of Excellence award.

== Schools ==
Schools in the district (with 2022–23 enrollment data from the National Center for Education Statistics) are:

Elementary school

- Parkview Elementary School with 384 students in pre-kindergarten through third grade
  - Brian Blumenstein, principal

Middle school

- Samuel S. Yellin School with 507 students in grades 4 through 8
  - Caitlin Holloway, principal

== Administration ==
Core members of the district's administration are:

- Renee D. Egan, superintendent
- Debra Trasatti, business administrator and board secretary

== Board of education ==
The district's board of education, comprised of nine members, sets policy and oversees the fiscal and educational operation of the district through its administration. As a Type II school district, the board's trustees are elected directly by voters to serve three-year terms of office on a staggered basis, with three seats up for election each year held (since 2012) as part of the November general election. The board appoints a superintendent to oversee the district's day-to-day operations and a business administrator to supervise the business functions of the district. The board includes additional trustees from the sending districts, with one from Hi-Nella and one from Laurel Springs.
