= West Atco, New Jersey =

Populated place in Camden County, New Jersey, US

- Unincorporated community
- Location in Camden County (Inset: Camden County in New Jersey) West Atco (New Jersey) West Atco (the United States)
- Coordinates: 39°44′45″N 74°53′28″W
- Country: United States
- State: New Jersey
- County: Camden
- Township: Winslow
- Elevation: 180 ft (55 m)
- GNIS feature ID: 881672

West Atco is an unincorporated community located within Winslow Township in Camden County, in the U.S. state of New Jersey. One of Winslow Township's many parks is West Atco Park, a 1-acre (4,000 m^{2}) public park located in the community that includes a playground, baseball field and basketball court.

== See also ==
- Atco, New Jersey
