= Haddon Heights School District =

School district in Camden County, New Jersey, US

Address
- 301 Second Avenue Haddon Heights, Camden County, New Jersey, 08035; United States
- Coordinates: 39.878132°N 75.056843°W

District information
- Grades: K-12
- Superintendent: Carla Bittner
- Business administrator: Donna Phillips
- Schools: 4

Students and staff
- Enrollment: 1,556 (as of 2024–25)
- Faculty: 135.5 FTEs
- Student–teacher ratio: 11.5:1

Other information
- District Factor Group: GH
- Website: www.gogarnets.com
Ind.	Per pupil	District spending	Rank (*)	K-12 average	%± vs. average
1A	Total Spending	$17,249	17	$18,891	−8.7%
1	Budgetary Cost	13,222	16	14,783	−10.6%
2	Classroom Instruction	8,197	24	8,763	−6.5%
6	Support Services	1,688	7	2,392	−29.4%
8	Administrative Cost	1,352	3	1,485	−9.0%
10	Operations & Maintenance	1,416	14	1,783	−20.6%
13	Extracurricular Activities	560	37	268	109.0%
16	Median Teacher Salary	60,863	25	64,043
Data from NJDoE 2014 Taxpayers' Guide to Education Spending. *Of K-12 districts with up to 1,800 students. Lowest spending=1; Highest=49

The Haddon Heights School District is a comprehensive community public school district that serves students in pre-kindergarten through twelfth grade from Haddon Heights, in Camden County, in the U.S. state of New Jersey.

As of the 2024–25 school year, the district, comprised of four schools, had an enrollment of 1,556 students and 135.5 classroom teachers (on an FTE basis), for a student–teacher ratio of 11.5:1.

The district participates in the Interdistrict Public School Choice Program, which allows non-resident students to attend school in the district at no cost to their parents, with tuition covered by the resident district. Available slots are announced annually by grade.

The district's high school also serves students from the neighboring communities of Barrington, Lawnside and Merchantville, who attend the high school for grades 9–12 as part of sending/receiving relationships.

== History ==
The Haddon Heights district approved an agreement with the Merchantville School District in September 2013 that would add nearly 80 students a year from Merchantville to the high school, in addition to the average of more than 260 students from Barrington and 120 from Lawnside that are being sent to Haddon Heights each year. The plan was approved by the commissioner of the New Jersey Department of Education, and students from Merchantville began attending the school in September 2015. Students from Merchantville already in high school before 2015 continued to attend Pennsauken High School until their graduation, as part of a longstanding sending/receiving relationship with the Pennsauken Public Schools in Pennsauken Township.

The district had been classified by the New Jersey Department of Education as being in District Factor Group "GH", the third-highest of eight groupings. District Factor Groups organize districts statewide to allow comparison by common socioeconomic characteristics of the local districts. From lowest socioeconomic status to highest, the categories are A, B, CD, DE, FG, GH, I and J.

== Schools ==
Schools in the district (with 2024–25 enrollment data from the National Center for Education Statistics) are:

Elementary schools

- Atlantic Avenue Elementary School with 125 students in grades PreK–2
  - Christopher Ormsby, principal
- Glenview Elementary School with 261 students in grades K–6
  - Eric Rosen, principal
- Seventh Avenue Elementary School with 145 students in grades 3–6
  - Christopher Ormsby, principal

Junior/senior high school

- Haddon Heights Junior/Senior High School with 926 students in grades 7–12
  - Warren Danenza, principal

== Administration ==
Core members of the school administration are:

- Carla Bittner, superintendent
- Donna Phillips, business administrator and board secretary

== Board of education ==
The district's board of education, comprised of nine elected members, sets policy and oversees the fiscal and educational operation of the district through its administration. As a Type II school district, the board's trustees are elected directly by voters to serve three-year terms of office on a staggered basis, with three seats up for election each year held (since 2013) as part of the November general election. The board appoints a superintendent to oversee the district's day-to-day operations and a business administrator to supervise the business functions of the district. Barrington, Lawnside and Merchantville each have appointed representatives to represent the interests of their respective districts on the Haddon Heights school board.
