= Eastern Camden County Regional High School District =

School district in Camden County, New Jersey, US

Address
- 1401 Laurel Oak Road Voorhees Township, Camden County, New Jersey, 08043; United States
- Coordinates: 39.846284°N 74.98674°W

District information
- Grades: 9-12
- Superintendent: Sarah Bilotti
- Business administrator: Kenneth Verrill
- Schools: 1

Students and staff
- Enrollment: 1,866 (as of 2024–25)
- Faculty: 141.8 FTEs
- Student–teacher ratio: 13.2:1

Other information
- District Factor Group: GH
- Website: www.eccrsd.us
Ind.	Per pupil	District spending	Rank (*)	9-12 average	%± vs. average
1A	Total Spending	$17,690	6	$18,891	−6.4%
1	Budgetary Cost	14,747	17	15,592	−5.4%
2	Classroom Instruction	7,868	10	8,807	−10.7%
6	Support Services	2,329	23	2,294	1.5%
8	Administrative Cost	1,603	20	1,592	0.7%
10	Operations & Maintenance	2,140	32	1,954	9.5%
13	Extracurricular Activities	721	14	873	−17.4%
16	Median Teacher Salary	73,851	35	71,726
Data from NJDoE 2014 Taxpayers' Guide to Education Spending. *Of 9-12 districts with any number of students. Lowest spending=1; Highest=47

The Eastern Camden County Regional High School District is a limited-purpose, regional public school district for students in ninth through twelfth grades from Berlin Borough, Gibbsboro and Voorhees Township, three communities in Camden County, in the U.S. state of New Jersey.

As of the 2024–25 school year, the district, comprised of one school, had an enrollment of 1,866 students and 141.8 classroom teachers (on an FTE basis), for a student–teacher ratio of 13.2:1.

The school district has a certified network of 500-plus Apple Macintosh computer workstations. Eastern has a professional staff of more than 200. As a comprehensive secondary school, Eastern is accredited by the New Jersey Department of Education. The average academic class size is 24. Daily student attendance averages more than 92.5% and the annual dropout rate is less than 2%.

== History ==
The origin of the district dates to 1964, when voters in all three sending communities approved a referendum to fund the construction of a high school..

The original school building with 18 classrooms was constructed on a site covering 50 acres (20 ha) at a cost of $1.7 million (equivalent to $28.7 million in 2025). Prior to opening, students from Berlin Borough attended Edgewood Regional High School, while those from Gibbsboro and Voorhees Township were sent to either Collingswood High School or Haddonfield Memorial High School.

The school opened in 1965, with 35 professional staff and 525 students in grades 9–11 in a building designed to accommodate enrollment of 850. The school was originally divided into schools on the same site: Eastern Intermediate High School (for grades 9–10), completed in 1992, and Eastern Senior High School (for grades 11–12), with more than 1,000 students enrolled at Eastern Senior High School and 1,150 students enrolled at Eastern Intermediate High School. In September 2012, the schools merged into one unit with the retirement of James Talarico in June 2012 and was renamed "Eastern Regional High School" with Robert Tull serving as the principal of the merged school. The oldest parts of the school, which were constructed in 1965, 1970, and 1975 are now the "11-12 Building", and the 1992 addition is referred to as the "9-10 Building".

The district had been classified by the New Jersey Department of Education as being in District Factor Group "GH", the third-highest of eight groupings. District Factor Groups organize districts statewide to allow comparison by common socioeconomic characteristics of the local districts. From lowest socioeconomic status to highest, the categories are A, B, CD, DE, FG, GH, I and J.

== Schools ==
- Eastern Regional High School is the district's lone school, serving grades 9–12. As of the 2023–24 school year, the school had an enrollment of 1,898 students.
  - Steve Lee, principal

== Administration ==
Core members of the district's administration are:

- Sarah Bilotti, superintendent
- Kenneth Verrill, business administrator and board secretary

== Board of education ==
The district's board of education is comprised of nine members who set policy and oversee the fiscal and educational operation of the district through its administration. As a Type II school district, the board's trustees are elected directly by voters to serve three-year terms of office on a staggered basis, with three seats up for election each year held (since 2012) as part of the November general election. The board appoints a superintendent to oversee the district's day-to-day operations and a business administrator to supervise the business functions of the district. Representation on the board of education is determined by the population of each of the three sending districts, with six seats allocated to Voorhees Township, two to Berlin Borough and one to Gibbsboro.
