= Timber Creek Regional High School =

High school in Camden County, New Jersey, US

Location
- 501 Jarvis Road; Gloucester Township, Camden County, New Jersey 08081; United States; 39.760518°N 75.013455°W

Information
- Type: Public high school
- Established: 2001
- School district: Black Horse Pike Regional School District
- NCES School ID: 340177000425
- Principal: Kelly A. McKenzie
- Faculty: 89.7 FTEs
- Enrollment: 1,137 (as of 2023–24)
- Student to teacher ratio: 12.7:1
- Colors: Navy blue and silver
- Athletics conference: Tri-County Conference (general); West Jersey Football League (football)
- Team name: Chargers
- Website: tchs.bhprsd.org

Timber Creek Regional High School is a four-year comprehensive community public high school for students in ninth through twelfth grades located in the Erial section of Gloucester Township in Camden County, in the U.S. state of New Jersey, operating as one of the three secondary schools of the Black Horse Pike Regional School District. When the school opened on September 12, 2001, attendance zones were realigned to relieve overcrowding conditions at Highland and Triton high schools. Timber Creek serves students from the southern portion of Gloucester Township.

Timber Creek High School sits on 278,000 square feet (25,800 m^{2}) and includes 32 academic classrooms, 12 laboratory classrooms, a music suite, two art classrooms, an industrial technology lab and a design-drafting classroom. In the high school itself there is an auditorium which seats 1,000 people, a cafeteria, and a library-media center which contains a television studio. The building is fully air-conditioned.

As of the 2023–24 school year, the school had an enrollment of 1,137 students and 89.7 classroom teachers (on an FTE basis), for a student–teacher ratio of 12.7:1. There were 315 students (27.7% of enrollment) eligible for free lunch and 59 (5.2% of students) eligible for reduced-cost lunch.

== History ==
With enrollment at the two existing high schools rising from 2,800 in 1990 to almost 3,500 in 2000, the district planned a third facility. With construction underway in February 2000, the school was constructed on a 68-acre (28 ha) site at a cost of $41.2 million (equivalent to $74.9 million in 2025). The school opened the day after 9/11 with 850 students, with 1,200 students expected the following school year. The school holds a 9/11 anniversary event to mark the anniversary of its opening every year and on the 20th anniversary, unveiled a 9/11 memorial.

== Awards, recognition and rankings ==
The school was the 182nd-ranked public high school in New Jersey out of 339 schools statewide in New Jersey Monthly magazine's September 2014 cover story on the state's "Top Public High Schools", using a new ranking methodology. The school had been ranked 246th in the state of 328 schools in 2012, after being ranked 219th in 2010 out of 322 schools listed. The magazine ranked the school 240th in 2008 out of 316 schools. The school was ranked 250th in the magazine's September 2006 issue, which surveyed 316 schools across the state. Schooldigger.com ranked the school as 244th out of 376 public high schools statewide in its 2010 rankings (a decrease of 9 positions from the 2009 rank) which were based on the combined percentage of students classified as proficient or above proficient on the language arts literacy and mathematics components of the High School Proficiency Assessment (HSPA).

== Athletics ==
The Timber Creek Regional High School Chargers compete as one of the member schools in the Tri-County Conference, which includes public and private high schools located in Camden, Cape May, Cumberland, Gloucester and Salem counties. The conference is overseen by the New Jersey State Interscholastic Athletic Association (NJSIAA). The school announced in 2018 that they would leave the Olympic Conference and join the Tri-County Conference for the 2020–21 school year, which would have the benefit of having all three schools in the Black Horse Pike District competing in the same athletic conference. With 886 students in grades 10–12, the school was classified by the NJSIAA for the 2019–20 school year as Group III for most athletic competition purposes, which included schools with an enrollment of 761 to 1,058 students in that grade range. The football team competes in the Memorial Division of the 94-team West Jersey Football League superconference and was classified by the NJSIAA as Group III South for football for 2024–2026, which included schools with 695 to 882 students.

The baseball team won its first South Jersey Group III title in 2008, defeating Clearview Regional High School by a score of 9–3 to take the title game.

The boys spring track team won the Group III state championship in 2008–2011, 2013 and 2014. The team won Olympic Conference, South Jersey Group III championships and New Jersey Group III state championships every year from 2008 to 2011. In the 2008-09 winter track season the 4x4 relay team of Derrick Henry, Allen Jackson, Saliym Starkey and Damiere Byrd ran an indoor record with the time of 3:21. In the 55, Damiere Byrd was named the fastest in Group III, ran the fastest time in the state, the fastest for a sophomore and a time that ranked eighth nationally, and he won the Group II titles in the 100, 200 and 400 meters in 2010.

The boys' wrestling team won the South Jersey Group III state sectional championship in 2008, 2010, 2011 and 2012. The team won their first sectional title in 2008, defeating second-seeded Hammonton High School in a close battle coming down to the last match, making it 30–29.

The football team won the South Jersey Group III state sectional title in 2011 and won the South Jersey Group IV title in 2012 and 2016. The team finished 12–0 in 2011 after winning the South Jersey Group III championship game at Rowan University with a 33–7 win against Hammonton High School. In 2016, the football team finished the season 12–0, winning the South Jersey Group IV state sectional championship by a score of 31–10 against Lenape High School in the tournament final.

The boys track team won the winter / indoor Group III state title in 2013 and 2014. The girls team won in Group III in 2017.

The boys track team won the Group III indoor relay championship in 2016 and 2018 (as co-champion); the girls team won the 2017 Group III championship.

With the group finals cancelled in 2020 due to COVID-19, the boys basketball team was declared as South III regional champion. The team won their first South Jersey, Group III title in 2008, defeating the top-seeded Hammonton High School by a score of 58–50 in the tournament final.

== Extracurricular activities ==
Timber Creek's Choir and Chorale and Voices of Jazz Vocal Groups have been invited and volunteered to sing for many occasions to service the community.

The drama program has shown play productions like Les Misérables, The Remarkable Incident at Carson Corners High School, The Cinderella Complex, A Midsummer Night's Dream, and Rebel Without a Cause as well as its musicals, a revue, Once Upon a Mattress, Little Shop of Horrors, Joseph and the Amazing Technicolor Dreamcoat, The Wiz, Damn Yankees, How to Succeed in Business Without Really Trying, "Grease" and the most recent performance of Hairspray for the 2010–11 school year.

The Timber Creek Chargers Marching Band were Top 10 Atlantic Coast Championship finalists in 2006. The band finished in second place at the 2007 United States Scholastic Band Association National Championships, competing as a Group I band at M&T Bank Stadium in Baltimore, Maryland on November 16, 2007, with a score of 94.225. In 2011, they won first place in Group 2A at the Tournament of Bands South Jersey Chapter Championships with a score of 93.05 at Clearview Regional High School.

The Timber Creek Indoor Percussion Ensemble has been finalists in the Winter Guard International World Championships in 2009 and 2011. In 2010, the ensemble performed in the Percussion Scholastic A Class, winning Scholastic A Class Finals with a score of 96.713.

The Theatre Arts classes also perform at various school-orientated performances for their fellow students. As of June 2007, Timber Creek has a National Art Honor Society chapter.

Timber Creek also provides numerous opportunities for students to get involved with after school. These include the French Club, Spanish Club, Cooking, Band, in addition to numerous other activities.

Timber Creek has a chapter of the National Honor Society to recognize students at the school, inducting juniors and seniors who meet the Honor Society ideals of character, scholarship, leadership, and service.

== Administration ==
The school's principal is Kelly A. McKenzie. Her core administration team includes five vice principals, one for each class and one who serves as athletic director.

== Other district high schools ==
Including Triton, there are three high schools in the Black Horse Pike Regional School District. Students attend one of the three based upon their residence. The other two schools (with 2023–24 enrollment from the National Center for Education Statistics) are:

- Highland Regional High School is located in Blackwood; Highland opened in 1967 and served 1,175 students from Gloucester Township
- Triton Regional High School is located in Runnemede; Established in 1957, the school served 1,114 students from Bellmawr, Gloucester Township and Runnemede

== Notable alumni ==
- Damiere Byrd (born 1993; class of 2011), former wide receiver for the Carolina Panthers
- Jihaad Campbell (born 2004), American football linebacker for the Philadelphia Eagles
- Kyle Hines (born 1986; class of 2004), former professional basketball player for Olimpia Milano of the Italian Lega Basket Serie A, Player Development Assistant for the Brooklyn Nets
- Tyler Hines (born 1990; class of 2008), former professional basketball player and brother of Kyle Hines.
- Devin Leary (born 1999), American football quarterback for the Baltimore Ravens
- Tyreek Maddox-Williams (born 1997), former American football linebacker for the Arizona Cardinals
- Tarheeb Still (born 2002), NFL cornerback for the Los Angeles Chargers
