= Highland Regional High School =

High school in New Jersey, United States

Location
- 450 Erial Road; Gloucester Township, Camden County, New Jersey 08012; United States
- 39.80201°N 75.05027°W

Information
- Type: Public high school
- School district: Black Horse Pike Regional School District
- NCES School ID: 340177001336
- Principal: Ryan C. Varga
- Faculty: 91.9 FTEs
- Enrollment: 1,150 (as of 2024–25)
- Student to teacher ratio: 12.5:1
- Colors: Columbia Blue and Navy
- Athletics conference: Tri-County Conference (general); West Jersey Football League (football)
- Mascot: Scotty the Tartan
- Team name: Tartans
- Website: hhs.bhprsd.org

Highland Regional High School is a four-year comprehensive public high school serving students in ninth through twelfth grades from Gloucester Township in Camden County, in the U.S. state of New Jersey. The school is located in the Blackwood section of Gloucester Township and is one of the three secondary schools of the Black Horse Pike Regional School District, which also includes Timber Creek Regional High School and Triton Regional High School (which serves students from Bellmawr and Runnemede). The school is accredited by the New Jersey Department of Education.

As of the 2024–25 school year, the school had an enrollment of 1,150 students and 91.9 classroom teachers (on an FTE basis), for a student–teacher ratio of 12.5:1. There were 354 students (30.8% of enrollment) eligible for free lunch and 210 (18.3% of students) eligible for reduced-cost lunch.

== History ==
Ground was broken in June 1966 for construction of a building that would be the district's second school facility, which would have a capacity of 1,200 students and be built at a cost of $2.7 million (equivalent to $26.8 million in 2025) on a site 33 acres (13 ha). The school opened in 1967, allowing split sessions at Triton High School to end.

In 1993, Highland Regional High School students voted to allow a prayer before their graduation ceremony. The school district was quickly sued by a graduating senior with the support of the American Civil Liberties Union of New Jersey over separation of church and state. The case was heard by the United States Court of Appeals for the Third Circuit, which ruled against the school district in a 9-4 decision.

== Awards, recognition and rankings ==
The school was the 254th-ranked public high school in New Jersey out of 339 schools statewide in New Jersey Monthly magazine's September 2014 cover story on the state's "Top Public High Schools", using a new ranking methodology. The school had been ranked 284th in the state of 328 schools in 2012, after being ranked 252nd in 2010 out of 322 schools listed. The magazine ranked the school 269th in 2008 out of 316 schools. The school was ranked 224th in the magazine's September 2006 issue, which surveyed 316 schools across the state.

== Athletics ==
The Highland Regional High School Tartans compete as one of the member schools in the Tri-County Conference, which is comprised of public and private high schools located in Camden, Cape May, Cumberland, Gloucester and Salem counties. The conference is overseen by the New Jersey State Interscholastic Athletic Association (NJSIAA). With 958 students in grades 10-12, the school was classified by the NJSIAA for the 2019–20 school year as Group III for most athletic competition purposes, which included schools with an enrollment of 761 to 1,058 students in that grade range. The football team competes in the Memorial Division of the 94-team West Jersey Football League superconference and was classified by the NJSIAA as Group III South for football for 2024–2026, which included schools with 695 to 882 students.

The 1975 baseball team finished the season with an 18-7 record after winning the Group I state title by a score of 1-0 against Ridgefield Park High School on a one-hitter in the championship game.

Highland Regional's most successful athletic program had been the boys' wrestling program, winning numerous state championships until the late 1990s. The team won the South Jersey Group IV state sectional championships in 1981-1985 and 1991-1996, and the South Jersey Group III title in 1987 and 1990. The team was Group IV state champion in 1982-1985, 1991, 1992 and 1994-1996; the program's nine state championships are third-most of any public school in the state. Ralph E. Ross was the head coach during this period of time and became the winningest high school wrestling coach in South Jersey history with 405 wins, the second-most in state history. The 1996 team defeated Roxbury High School in the semis and Middletown High School North in the finals to win the Group IV state championship. The program produced Joe Melchiore, who lost only three matches his entire career, all during his freshman year. He was a three-time state champion in high school and a four-time All-American selection in college. He also represented the United States in the World Championships where he placed 7th. Both Melchiore and Ross were inducted into the South Jersey Wrestling Hall of Fame in 1990. In the auxiliary gym of the high school, an entire wall is devoted to the team's accomplishments. In 2012, Mike Davidson became the team's head coach and led the team to four straight district titles.

The boys' cross country team won the Group III state championship in 1989 and the Group IV title in 1994. The 1994 boys cross country team went undefeated and were Olympic Conference champions. Additionally, they won the South Jersey Open and the Group IV sectionals on their way to win the Group IV state championship (the only Group IV state title for the boys cross country team). The team's best finish came in the Group IV Sectional meet where Tartan runners came in 1st, 2nd, 7th, 14th, 15th, 16th, and 23rd out of a field of approximately 126 runners. The top five averaged 16:06.4 for the 3.1 mile course and scored 39 points to blow out the 2nd place team, Eastern Regional High School, who scored 86. It was the largest victory margin of the meet. In the Group IV state meet, the top five runners finished 3rd, 5th, 20th, 23rd, and 36th to win with 67 points, ahead of the second-place team, Westfield High School, which scored 92.

In 2004, the girls' basketball team won the South, Group III state sectional championship, their first in Group III, with an 82-45 win against Woodrow Wilson High School.

The boys' track team won the Group II state indoor relay championship in 2014.

== Marching and jazz bands ==
The Highland Regional Marching Band has had success in the Tournament of Bands competitions since the turn of the millennium. The marching band won the Chapter One Championship in 2005, led by band director Chris Tumminia, the first such championship in the band's history. The band successfully defended their Chapter One Championship in 2006, and were the 2002 Atlantic Coast Invitational Champion in Group 1.

The school's pep band performs in numerous parades winning first place at the Bridesburg Memorial Day Parade in 2012 and 2013

The school's indoor color guard was the Tournament Indoor Association Scholastic Novice champions in 2006 and the Scholastic Intermediate A champions in 2007.

The school's indoor drumline was the Tournament Indoor Association Scholastic Open champions in 2001 and the Scholastic A champions in 2005 and 2008. In 2016 and 2019 the drumline took 1st place in the 'Regional A' Class for the Mid-Atlantic Percussion Society circuit.

The school's competitive jazz ensemble placed second in the New Jersey state finals in 1991 and first in the Atlantic Coast Championships in 2013 and 2014.

== Administration ==
The school's principal is Ryan C. Varga. His administration team includes five vice principals, one for each class and one who serves as athletic director.

== Notable alumni ==
- Ryan Buchter (born 1987, class of 2005), professional baseball pitcher for the Oakland Athletics, who debuted for the Atlanta Braves in 2014
- Mike Daniels (born 1989, class of 2007), defensive end for the NFL's Detroit Lions
- Sean Daniels (born 1991, class of 2010), arena football player
- Donovin Darius (born 1975), former American football safety who played in the NFL for the Jacksonville Jaguars and Miami Dolphins
- Joseph Menna (born 1970), sculptor and engraver who has worked in both digital and traditional sculpture media
- Dave Miller (born 1966), former bullpen coach for the Cleveland Indians of Major League Baseball
- Joe Vitt (born 1954, class of 1972), former assistant head coach and linebackers coach for the New Orleans Saints
- Sharnee Zoll-Norman (born 1986), point guard who has played for the Chicago Sky of the WNBA
