= Black Horse Pike Regional School District =

School district in Camden County, New Jersey, US

Address
- 580 Erial Road Blackwood, Camden County, New Jersey, 08012; United States
- Coordinates: 39.783224°N 75.056807°W

District information
- Grades: 9-12
- Superintendent: Brian Repici
- Business administrator: Scott Kipers
- Schools: 3

Students and staff
- Enrollment: 3,527 (as of 2023–24)
- Faculty: 290.1 FTEs
- Student–teacher ratio: 12.2:1

Other information
- District Factor Group: DE
- Website: www.bhprsd.org
Ind.	Per pupil	District spending	Rank (*)	9-12 average	%± vs. average
1A	Total Spending	$17,952	7	$18,891	−5.0%
1	Budgetary Cost	13,635	7	15,592	−12.6%
2	Classroom Instruction	7,339	5	8,807	−16.7%
6	Support Services	2,293	22	2,294	0.0%
8	Administrative Cost	1,391	8	1,592	−12.6%
10	Operations & Maintenance	1,957	22	1,954	0.2%
13	Extracurricular Activities	619	10	873	−29.1%
16	Median Teacher Salary	57,207	2	71,726
Data from NJDoE 2014 Taxpayers' Guide to Education Spending. *Of 9-12 districts with any number of students. Lowest spending=1; Highest=47

The Black Horse Pike Regional School District (BHPRSD) is a regional public high school district serving students in ninth through twelfth grades from Bellmawr Borough, Gloucester Township and Runnemede Borough in Camden County, in the U.S. state of New Jersey. Students from Bellmawr and Runnemede attend Triton Regional High School, while students from Gloucester Township are split across the district's three schools, based on their home address.

As of the 2023–24 school year, the district, comprised of three schools, had an enrollment of 3,527 students and 290.1 classroom teachers (on an FTE basis), for a student–teacher ratio of 12.2:1.

The district had been classified by the New Jersey Department of Education as being in District Factor Group "DE", the fifth-highest of eight groupings. District Factor Groups organize districts statewide to allow comparison by common socioeconomic characteristics of the local districts. From lowest socioeconomic status to highest, the categories are A, B, CD, DE, FG, GH, I and J.

In order to graduate, students must pass the New Jersey High School Proficiency Assessment (HSPA), earn a total of 115 credits and pass the following courses: four years of Physical Education, four years of Health, four years of English, one year of World History / Cultures, two years of U.S. History, three years of Math, three years of Science, two years of Visual / Performing / Practical Arts and a year of Career Education. The district's schools offer Advanced Placement courses, Honors, dual credit with area community colleges and cooperative education / work study programs in business and industry. As of Summer 2014, all three schools have a revamped dress code (that bans tank tops and requests that shorts must be mid-thigh at length) and eliminated homeroom.

== History ==
Early discussions for forming a district date back to 1949, when representatives from Bellmawr, Mount Ephraim, Runnemede and Gloucester Township met to discuss projections for enrollment three years down the road. Students from Bellmawr had been attending Haddon Heights High School, those from Runnemede were at Audubon High School and students from Gloucester Township was sending to Haddonfield Memorial High School. By June 1955, both Audubon Park and Mount Ephraim had dropped consideration of joining the regional district. The remaining districts had been told by their host high schools that Bellmawr students could no longer be accepted at Haddon Heights High School or those from Runnemede at Audubon High School, while Gloucester Township had been forced to send ninth graders to Paulsboro High School, as they could not be accommodated at Haddonfield Memorial High School.

Voters approved spending $2.3 million (equivalent to $22.2 million in 2025) for construction of Triton Regional High School, the district's first facility. The school opened in September 1957 with a total of 980 students.

Ground was broken in June 1966 for construction for Highland Regional High School, the district's second school facility, which would have a capacity of 1,200 students and be built at a cost of $2.7 million (equivalent to $26.8 million in 2025) on a site 33 acres (13 ha). The school opened in 1967, allowing split sessions at Triton High School to end.

With enrollment at the two existing high schools rising from 2,800 in 1990 to almost 3,500 in 2000, the district planned a third facility. With construction underway in February 2000, Timber Creek High School was constructed on a 68-acre (28 ha) site at a cost of $41.2 million (equivalent to $74.9 million in 2025). The school opened the day after 9/11 with 850 students, with 1,200 students expected the following school year.

== Schools ==
There are three high schools that are part of the district. Students from Gloucester Township attend one of the three schools based on their residence. The schools in the district (with 2023–24 enrollment data from the National Center for Education Statistics) are:

- Highland Regional High School is located in Blackwood; Highland opened in 1967 and served 1,175 students from Gloucester Township.
  - Ryan C. Varga, principal
- Timber Creek Regional High School is school is located in Erial and served 1,137 students from Gloucester Township. The school opened the day after 9/11.
  - Kelly McKenzie, principal
- Triton Regional High School is located in Runnemede; Established in 1957, the school served 1,114 students from Bellmawr, Gloucester Township and Runnemede
  - Melissa Sheppard, principal

== Administrators ==
Core members of the district's administration are:

- Brian Repici, superintendent
- Scott Kipers, business administrator and board secretary

== Board of education ==
The district's board of education, comprised of nine members, sets policy and oversee the fiscal and educational operation of the district through its administration. As a Type II school district, the board's trustees are elected directly by voters to serve three-year terms of office on a staggered basis, with three seats up for election each year held (since 2012) as part of the November general election. The board appoints a superintendent to oversee the district's day-to-day operations and a business administrator to supervise the business functions of the district. Seats on the board are allocated to the constituent municipalities based on population, with seven seats allocated to Gloucester Township and one each to Bellmawr and Runnemede.
