= Erlton-Ellisburg, New Jersey =

Populated place in Camden County, New Jersey, US

- Former census-designated place
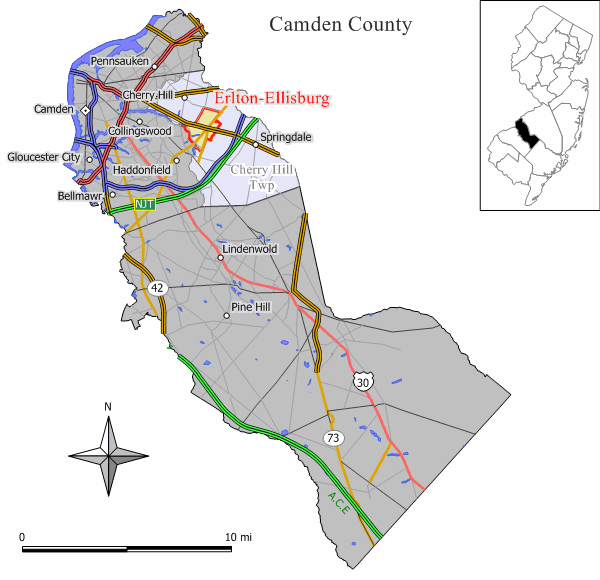
- Map of Erlton-Ellisburg CDP in Camden County. Inset: Location of Camden County in New Jersey.
- Coordinates: 39°54′55″N 75°0′52″W
- Country: United States
- State: New Jersey
- County: Camden
- Township: Cherry Hill

Area
  - Total: 1.9 sq mi (4.9 km^{2})
  - Land: 1.9 sq mi (4.8 km^{2})
  - Water: 0.039 sq mi (0.1 km^{2})

Population (2000 census)
  - Total: 8,168
  - Density: 4,393/sq mi (1,696.1/km^{2})
- Time zone: UTC−05:00 (Eastern (EST))
  - Summer (DST): UTC−04:00 (EDT)
- FIPS code: 34-21645

Erlton-Ellisburg was an unincorporated community and census-designated place (CDP) located within Cherry Hill Township, in Camden County, in the U.S. state of New Jersey. As of the 2000 United States census, the CDP's population was 8,168. The area comprises Erlton and Ellisburg, two neighborhoods in western Cherry Hill. As of the 2010 United States census, the Erlton-Ellisburg CDP was discontinued and a portion of the old CDP was included in the new Ellisburg CDP.

== Geography ==
According to the United States Census Bureau, the CDP had a total area of 4.9 km^{2} (1.9 sq mi), including 4.8 km^{2} (1.9 sq mi) of land and 0.1 km^{2} (0.039 sq mi) of water (1.06%).

== Demographics ==
Erlton-Ellisburg first appeared as a census designated place in the 2000 U.S. census created from part of the deleted Cherry Hill CDP. The CDP was deleted prior to the 2010 U.S. census with part taken to form the Ellisburg CDP.

=== 2000 census ===
As of the 2000 United States census there were 8,168 people, 3,517 households, and 2,141 families residing in the CDP. The population density was 1,695.5 people /km^{2} (4,391 people/mi^{2}). There were 3,648 housing units at an average density of 757.3 units /km^{2} (1,961 units/mi^{2}). The racial makeup of the CDP was 86.96% White, 3.97% African American, 0.11% Native American, 6.70% Asian, 0.09% Pacific Islander, 0.92% from other races, and 1.26% from two or more races. Hispanic or Latino of any race were 3.81% of the population.

There were 3,517 households, out of which 24.3% had children under the age of 18 living with them, 47.5% were married couples living together, 9.6% had a female householder with no husband present, and 39.1% were non-families. 34.5% of all households were made up of individuals, and 16.7% had someone living alone who was 65 years of age or older. The average household size was 2.26 and the average family size was 2.92.

In the CDP the population was spread out, with 19.8% under the age of 18, 5.7% from 18 to 24, 29.6% from 25 to 44, 20.9% from 45 to 64, and 24.0% who were 65 years of age or older. The median age was 42 years. For every 100 females there were 84.9 males. For every 100 females age 18 and over, there were 79.8 males.

The median income for a household in the CDP was $47,953, and the median income for a family was $60,170. Males had a median income of $47,438 versus $33,096 for females. The per capita income for the CDP was $25,357. About 3.5% of families and 5.4% of the population were below the poverty line, including 3.1% of those under age 18 and 8.7% of those age 65 or over.

== Notable people ==
People who were born in, residents of, or otherwise closely associated with Erlton include:

- Judy Faulkner (born 1943), CEO and co-founder of Epic Systems, a healthcare software company.
