= Woodcrest, New Jersey =

Populated place in Camden County, New Jersey, US

- Neighborhood
- Location in Camden County (Inset: Camden County in New Jersey)
- Coordinates: 39°52′20″N 74°59′55″W
- Country: United States
- State: New Jersey
- County: Camden
- Township: Cherry Hill
- Established: 1955
- Elevation: 69 ft (21 m)
- Time zone: UTC−05:00 (Eastern (EST))
  - Summer (DST): UTC−04:00 (EDT)
- Area code: 856
- GNIS feature ID: 881919

Woodcrest is a neighborhood located within Cherry Hill in Camden County, in the U.S. state of New Jersey. The area dates back to the 1950s and is one of the oldest neighborhoods in Cherry Hill. It was developed by Morris and Harold Sarshik.

== Development ==
Originally a farming community, Woodcrest has a large amount of residential and commercial areas. Residential development began in 1955. Transportation includes several major roads in the area, including County Route 561 (Haddonfield-Berlin Road). Interstate 295 briefly runs through Woodcrest, having an interchange with County Route 561 and another at the Woodcrest Station on the PATCO Speedline. Woodcrest Country Club is a private golf course located on County Route 544 (Evesham Road). Woodcrest Swim Club is a private swim club that opened in 1957. Woodcrest Elementary School was established the following year.

== See also ==
- Ashland, New Jersey, an adjacent neighborhood and census designated place
