= Moorestown Friends School =

Quaker school in Moorestown, New Jersey, US

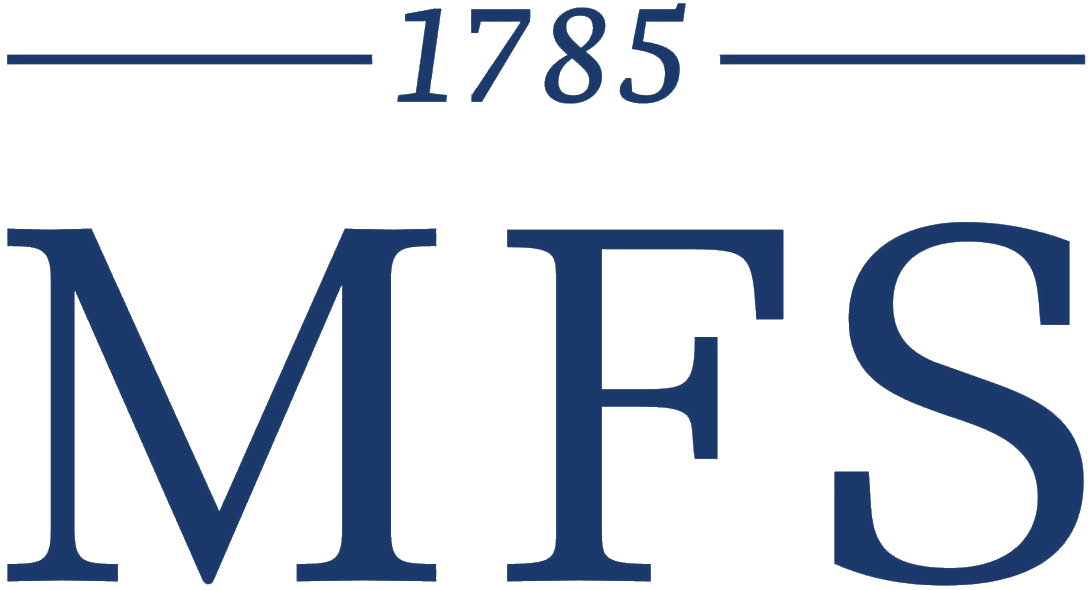

Location
- 110 East Main Street; Moorestown, Burlington County, New Jersey 08057; United States; 39.9651°N 74.9415°W

Information
- Type: Private, independent
- Established: 1785; 241 years ago
- NCES School ID: 00868087
- Head of school: Julia de la Torre
- Faculty: 76.1 FTEs
- Grades: PreK-12
- Gender: coeducational
- Enrollment: 552 (plus 45 in PreK, as of 2023–24)
- Student to teacher ratio: 7.3:1
- Colors: Red and Blue
- Athletics conference: Burlington County Scholastic League
- Team name: Foxes
- Yearbook: The Cupola
- Tuition: $39,000 (grades 9–12 for 2025–26)
- Website: mfriends.org

Moorestown Friends School (MFS) is a private, coeducational Quaker day school in Moorestown, in Burlington County, in the U.S. state of New Jersey.

As of the 2023–24 school year, the school had an enrollment of 552 students (plus 45 in PreK) and 76.1 classroom teachers (on an FTE basis), for a student–teacher ratio of 7.3:1.

The school has been accredited by the Middle States Association of Colleges and Schools Commissions on Elementary and Secondary Schools since 1991. MFS is also a member of the New Jersey Association of Independent Schools and the Association of Delaware Valley Independent Schools. The Head of school is Julia de la Torre.

== Awards and recognition ==
During the 1991–92 school year, Moorestown Friends Lower School was awarded the Blue Ribbon School Award of Excellence by the United States Department of Education, the highest award an American school can receive.

In 2007, Barbara Quinn Kreider, former chair of the science department and chemistry teacher, was recognized as the New Jersey parochial school teacher of the year, after her successful freshmen science program was rated number one in the country. In 2020, the Philadelphia Eagles selected Michael Omilian, upper school math teacher and Scheduling Director, as an Axalta All-Pro Teacher; he was one of 10 teachers in the Greater Philadelphia area to be recognized.

Historian James C. Scott dedicated his 1990 book Domination and the Arts of Resistance to Moorestown Friends School.

== History ==
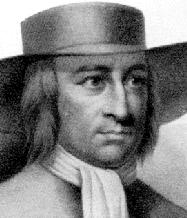
George Fox, founder of Quakerism

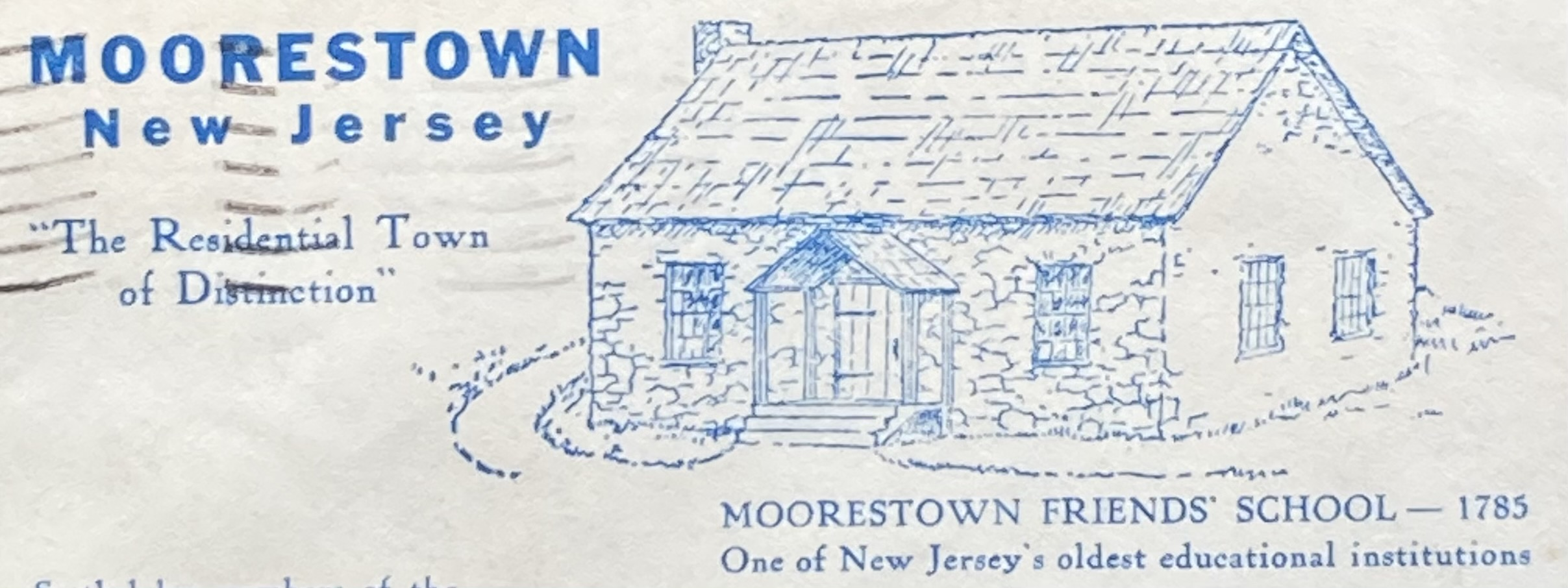
The 1785 stone schoolhouse

In 1781, thirty-three Quaker families pooled their funds and purchased a 2-acre (0.81 ha) lot, located near the intersection of Chester Avenue and Main Street. In 1785, a stone schoolhouse was erected and Joshua Hunt was the first teacher. In 1784, a lot near Colestown, a growing settlement located at the western side of the township, was purchased and a brick schoolhouse was erected.

In 1827, the Philadelphia Yearly Meeting, which the Moorestown Monthly Meeting is a part of, split into the Orthodox and Hicksite meetings. The Orthodox school stayed on the current site under the name "Moorestown Friends Academy", while a Hicksite school called "Moorestown Friends High School" a block away. The two schools recombined under the name "Moorestown Friends School" in 1920 at the current site.

In 1927, the kindergarten building was constructed, followed by the high school (1929) and gymnasium (1958). In 1965, the current Lower School was built. About two decades later, Stokes Hall was completed, linking the upper and lower schools. In 1997, the Commons Dining Hall was added. In 2002 and 2003, the Field House and Woodward Henry Diller Memorial Library were renovated, respectively. More recently, Moorestown Friends School purchased the Greenleaf Retirement facility to create the Greenleaf South Annex and Hartman Hall in 2008. In 2018, the Greenleaf South Annex was renamed Van Meter Hall in honor of the school's retired Head, Larry Van Meter.

== Upper school ==
Upper school at MFS includes grades 9 through 12.

=== Community service ===
All Upper School students must complete 50 hours of community service, and many participate in service trips to places Alaska, Spain, Chile, Portugal, Italy, Japan, Florida, and more. Faculty make an effort to engage students in their local communities, including the cities of Camden, New Jersey and Philadelphia.

=== Clubs ===
Extracurricular activities at MFS include Aerospace Club, Agenda Committee (similar to Student Government), Biology Olympiad Club, Chinese Culture Club, Diversity Committee, Drama Club, Christian Student Union, Gender Inclusivity Forum, Mental Health Forum, Indian Culture Club, Investment Club, Jewish Culture Club, Martin Luther King Jr. (MLK) Club, Science Olympiad Club, Model United Nations, Operation Smile Club (OSI), PRIDE Club, Service Committee, Spanish Club, Women in STEM, and Worship Planning, Red and Blue Club (School Spirit), Fashion Club, Sports Medicine, Design Club, Baking Club, Sports Debate and Entertainment, TEDx Club, Italian American Culture Club, Psychology Club, Image Arts & Literary Magazine, Operation Smile, Engineering Club, UNICEF at MFS, Book Club, Astronomy Club, French Club, Black Student Union, Women of Color [Union], Muslim Student Union, Jewish Student Union, Latinx Affinity, LGBTQ+ Affinity, Trans & Gender Non-conforming Affinity, Multiracial Affinity, East Asian Affinity, South Asian Affinity.

== Middle school ==
Middle school at MFS includes grades 5 through 8.

Students take courses in English, Math, Social Studies, Science, and World Languages as well as in non-major courses such as Woodshop, Art, Music, Physical Education, and Health. Technology is an important component of education at MFS. Faculty advisors meet with middle school students daily to help them develop effective study skills.

Middle school extracurricular activities include choir, band, theater, student government, robotics, architecture, web design, and newspaper. The students also have a variety of sports to choose from. Each Middle School grade level has a unique outdoor educational experience.

== Lower school ==
Lower school at MFS includes preschool through grade 4.

=== Beginnings at MFS ===
During the 2012–2013 school year, the early childhood program at Moorestown Friends School rebranded itself as "Beginnings at MFS" to stress the importance of preschool, prekindergarten, and kindergarten in a child's development.

"We consider the education of young children to be work of enormous importance. [...] This is a school where you will find an experienced, certified teacher with a Master's degree from the University of Pennsylvania leading a class of three-year-olds. Furthermore, in our early childhood classes, we maintain a ratio of one teacher to just 7 or 8 students."

=== Academic technology ===
Moorestown Friends School has more than 450 computers and laptops throughout the school, consisting of five computer labs, ten laptop carts and three mini-labs. Five of the laptop carts are for general use and two are for the middle and upper school Science Department. Mathematics, World Languages, and the lower school each have their own dedicated computer cart. MFS is predominantly a PC school; however there are several Macs and iPads available for use at every grade level.

The school has a MacBook Pro cart for high-end graphical and media use and an iPad cart as well. They acquired high-quality video production equipment and created an editing studio capable of creating high, near-professional quality video.

Numonic's interactive whiteboards with mounted projectors are in every classroom. The MFS campus has Wi-Fi accessibility throughout the entire school, and all upper school students are able to connect with their own personal devices.

The MFS library houses a computer processing center for students to research and prepare written work. The library's online catalog is available via the network throughout the school or from home. Students are also able to check out laptops, iPads and digital cameras from the Library.

== Diversity ==
58% of the student body are students of color.

=== The Camden Scholars Program ===
The Camden Scholars Program at MFS provides opportunities to students from the Camden City Public Schools in Camden, New Jersey. Recommended by guidance counselors at Camden Middle Schools, candidates apply to Moorestown Friends School, visit classes, and are interviewed.

Once selected by the Camden Scholars Committee and admitted, students receive a scholarship that provides virtually full tuition to MFS. Camden Scholars are encouraged to pursue their interests and develop their talents. Camden Scholars participate in clubs, serve as student leaders, are athletes and perform in plays. They go on overnight retreats and field trips. MFS has a Camden Scholars Coordinator who serves as a liaison to help participants adjust to their new learning environment and sustain a healthy and successful academic and extracurricular schedule. The school's Diversity Coordinator oversees student, employee and curricular diversity efforts throughout the entire school with the aid of a faculty/staff sub-committee.

=== Meeting for Worship ===
Each week, the MFS community gathers in the Meetinghouse, built in 1802, for Meeting for Worship. There are separate Meetings for each school division.

Friends believe that each person has within him/herself, with God's help, the ability to discern truth. Participants use this time to pray, or worship or simply reflect deeply on the world around them, according to their own faith traditions.

Since Friends believe that each person, no matter their age, is able to discern truth, all are welcome to speak from their hearts if so moved. It is expected that their words will be listened to from the same deep connection to the Spirit and provide insight for the listeners. When the Meeting for Worship is over, students on the facing benches close the Meeting by shaking hands. At this point everyone is invited to briefly greet their neighbor before settling back into quiet for dismissal.

=== The Examined Life ===
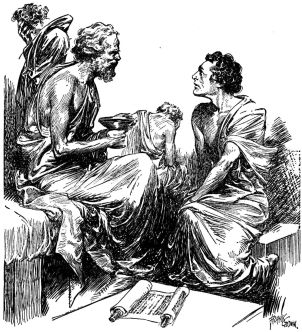
Socrates teaching.

The phrase "Examined Life" is drawn from Socrates' axiom: "The unexamined life is not worth living." The goal of such a life is to integrate a tough mind and a tender heart.

Moorestown Friends School's Examined Life Program has four components: Openness to a spiritual life, development and application of personal ethics in the community, critical thinking and development of resilience.

== Athletics ==
Varsity and Junior Varsity sports include: baseball, basketball, cross country, field hockey, fencing, golf, lacrosse, soccer, tennis and swimming. Middle School sports offered are baseball, basketball, field hockey, lacrosse, soccer and tennis.

MFS is a member of the Burlington County Scholastic League. The Moorestown Friends School Foxes also compete as a member of the New Jersey State Interscholastic Athletic Association, which allows the school's teams to compete for state championships. In keeping with Quaker philosophy, sportsmanship is stressed in all MFS athletics. The school's mascot is the Fox, named after George Fox, the founder of Quakerism.

Basketball

The girls' basketball team won the SJIBT championship in 2020 with a 68-45 win in the finals against Clearview Regional High School.

Soccer

The boys' soccer team won the Non-Public Group B state championship in 1979, defeating runner-up St. Cecilia High School with a 1-0 overtime win in the championship game. The team won the Non-Public B South title in 2015 (defeating Holy Cross Academy by a score of 2–0 in the tournament final), 2017 (vs. Immaculata High School), 2019 (vs. Wardlaw-Hartridge School), 2023 (vs. St. Rose High School) and 2024(vs. Princeton Day School). In 2016, the team captured the program's first-ever Friends School League championship.

In 2017, the girls' soccer team won the NJSIAA Non-Public B state championship for the first time in program history as co-champion with Montclair Kimberley Academy. The team won the NJSIAA sectional championships in 2017. In 2014, the girls' soccer team won the NJSIAA Non-Public B South championship, defeating Gill St. Bernard's School, 5–0. In 2015, the team repeated as the NJSIAA Non-Public B South champion, defeating Holy Spirit High School, 3–2 in double overtime.

Cross Country

The boys' cross country team were the 2007 South Jersey Non-Public B champions and state runner-up, which was the first cross country title in school history.

Field Hockey

The field hockey team won the South Jersey Group I state sectional championship in 1976. In 2019, the team won their third Friends School League championship, defeating Westtown School 3-1.

Fencing

The boys' fencing team was the NJSIAA state foil team winner from 2004-2007. Senior John Gurrieri won the state individual foil title in 2006. Senior Erin Chen won the state individual saber title in 2016.

Golf

The golf team won their first-ever Friends School League championship in 2019 and subsequently also captured FSL titles in 2021 and 2023.

Lacrosse

The girls' lacrosse team won the overall state championship in 1980, defeating Moorestown High School in the tournament final.

Tennis

The boys' tennis team was Non-Public B/C state champion in 1978. In 2017, the boys' tennis team won the NJSIAA Non-Public B South championship, defeating Rutgers Preparatory School 5–0.

The girls' tennis team won the 2005 South B state sectional championship with a 4–1 win over Sacred Heart High School. The 2007 team reclaimed the title, defeating Bishop Eustace High School 3–2 in the tournament final. The team won the Friends Schools League championship in 2017 and 2019. The girls' tennis team won the Non-Public B state championship in 2018 and 2019, defeating Newark Academy in the tournament final both years. The 2018 team defeated Newark Academy 3-2 in the finals.

Swimming

The swim team won seven gold medals in the 2018 Friends School League championship. In 2020, the girls' swim team won six gold medals, and the boys' swim team won two gold medals.

== Notable alumni ==
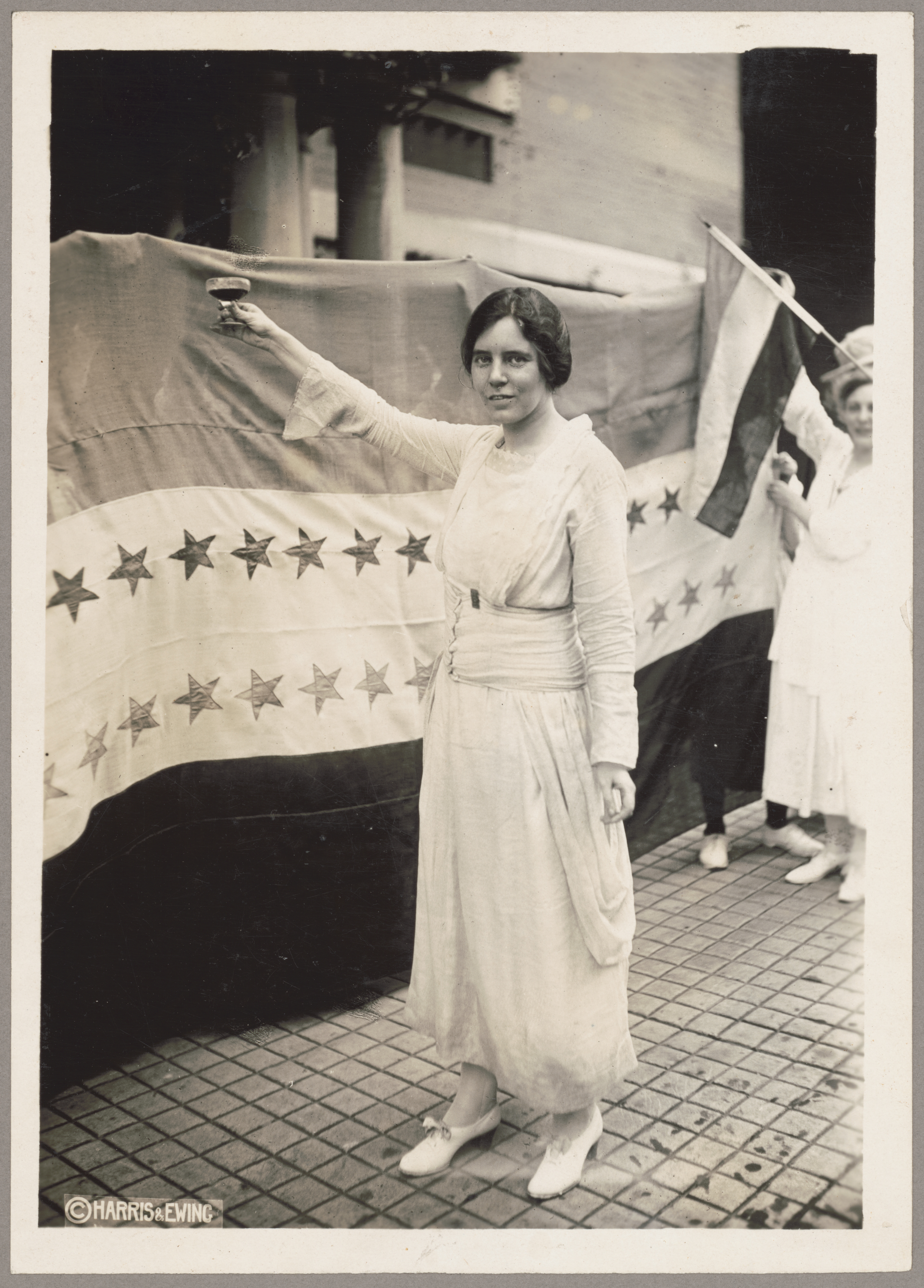
Alice Paul, Quaker alumna of Moorestown Friends School and prominent women's rights activist

- Mary Ellen Avery (1927–2011), National Medal of Science recipient for her pioneering research on RDS in premature infants.
- Gloria Borders (class of 1973), sound effects editor best known for Terminator 2: Judgment Day, for which she won an Academy Award.
- Jake Burbage (born 1992), actor.
- Linsey Davis (born 1977, class of 1995), broadcast journalist at ABC News, who anchors the Sunday edition of World News Tonight
- Judith Faulkner (born 1943, class of 1961), CEO and founder of Epic Systems, a healthcare software company.
- Fredric Jameson (born 1934, class of 1950), literary critic and winner of the 2012 Modern Language Association Award for Lifetime Scholarly Achievement.
- Vanessa Kara (born 1996), professional soccer player who plays as a forward for National Women's Soccer League club Racing Louisville.
- Mustapha Khan (class of 1980), Emmy Award-winning film and television director, best known for such films and television shows as Imagining America, Sesame Street and The Electric Company.
- Matt Langel (born 1977, class of 1996), head coach for the Colgate Raiders men's basketball team.
- Rob Moose (born 1982, class of 2000), musician.
- Alice Paul (1885–1977), suffragist leader.
- Michael Rutter (born 1933), psychiatrist in the United Kingdom who has been described as the "father of child psychology".
- James C. Scott (born 1936), Sterling Professor at Yale University.
- Joseph Hooton Taylor Jr. (born 1941), astrophysicist and winner of the 1993 Nobel Prize in Physics.
- Brian Willison (born 1977), IT consultant who was Executive Director of the Parsons Institute for Information Mapping at The New School.
- Martha Zweig (born 1942), poet.

== Bibliography ==
- DeCou, George (1929), Moorestown and her neighbors, Philadelphia: Harris & Partridge, Inc., p. 95, Colestown, the Deserted Village
- Hartman, Neil, et al. (editors) (1986), Moorestown Friends School, a history, Moorestown: Moorestown Friends School (publisher), 80 pages
- Woodward, E. M. (1883), History of Burlington County, New Jersey, with biographical sketches of many of its pioneers and prominent men, Philadelphia: Everts & Peck, pp. 270–1
