= Judith Faulkner =

American businesswoman (born 1943)

Judith R. Faulkner
- Faulkner in 2025
- Born: 11 August 1943 (age 83)
- Other name: Judy Faulkner
- Education: Dickinson College (BS 1965); University of Wisconsin–Madison (MS 1967)
- Occupation: Healthcare software entrepreneur
- Organization: Epic Systems
- Political party: Democratic
- Spouse: Gordon Faulkner
- Children: 3

Judith R. Faulkner (born August 11, 1943) is an American billionaire businesswoman who is the CEO and founder of Epic Systems, a healthcare software company located in Verona, Wisconsin. Faulkner founded Epic Systems in 1979, with the original name of Human Services Computing. In 2013, Forbes called her "the most powerful woman in healthcare", and as of July 2024, estimated her net worth at US$7.8 billion.

== Early life and education ==
Faulkner was born on August 11, 1943, to Louis and Del Greenfield. Faulkner's parents inspired her early interest in healthcare; her father, Louis, was a pharmacist, and her mother, Del, was the director of Oregon Physicians for Social Responsibility. She was raised in the Erlton neighborhood of Cherry Hill, New Jersey, and graduated from Moorestown Friends School in 1961. She received a bachelor's degree in mathematics from Dickinson College and a master's degree in computer science from the University of Wisconsin–Madison.

== Career ==
While getting her master's degree, Faulkner took a course on computing in medicine under Dr. Warner Slack. She was tasked with developing a system to keep track of patient information. In 1979, shortly after receiving her master's degree, Faulkner co-founded Human Services Computing, with Dr. John Greist. Human Services Computing, which later became Epic Systems, began in a basement at 2020 University Avenue in Madison, Wisconsin. The company was started with a $70,000 investment from friends and family but has never taken investment from venture capital or private equity and remains a privately held company. Faulkner prides herself in the fact that Epic is homegrown; they have never acquired another company, and Faulkner has stated they will never go public. Epic Systems now holds the medical records of over 325 million people. Faulkner and her family currently own 43 percent of Epic Systems.

== Awards and recognition ==
- Forbes' America's Top 50 Women In Tech 2018
- Forbes ranked her as the 55th most powerful woman in the world in 2023.

== Personal life ==
Faulkner lives in Madison, Wisconsin. She is married to Gordon Faulkner, a pediatrician, and they have three children.

In 2015, Faulkner signed The Giving Pledge, committing 99% of her assets to philanthropy. In 2019 Judy and Gordon founded the Roots & Wings Foundation, which funds nonprofit organizations that serve low-income children and families.
