= Ellisburg, New Jersey =

Populated place in Camden County, New Jersey, US

- Census-designated place
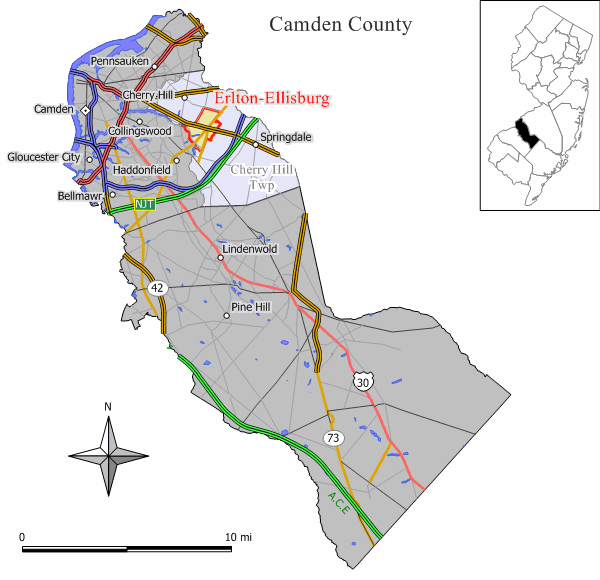
- Map of the former Erlton-Ellisburg CDP in Camden County. Inset: Location of Camden County in New Jersey.

- Location in Camden County Location in New Jersey Location in the United States
- Coordinates: 39.919889°N 75.009336°W
- Country: United States
- State: New Jersey
- County: Camden
- Township: Cherry Hill

Area
  - Total: 0.90 sq mi (2.34 km^{2})
  - Land: 0.90 sq mi (2.34 km^{2})
  - Water: 0 sq mi (0.00 km^{2}) 0.00%
- Elevation: 89 ft (27 m)

Population (2020)
  - Total: 4,601
  - Density: 5,085/sq mi (1,963.2/km^{2})
- Time zone: UTC−05:00 (Eastern (EST))
  - Summer (DST): UTC−04:00 (EDT)
- ZIP Code: 08002 - Cherry Hill
- Area code: 856
- FIPS code: 34-21120
- GNIS feature ID: 02583987

Ellisburg is an unincorporated community and census-designated place (CDP) located within Cherry Hill Township, in Camden County, in the U.S. state of New Jersey. As of the 2020 census, Ellisburg had a population of 4,601. The area had been part of the combined Erlton-Ellisburg CDP, which was discontinued after the 2000 census.

== History ==
Named for the prominent Ellis family who settled the area, the area that came to be known as Ellisburg was first the site of a blacksmith and tavern, which soon brought private homes to the area. A stagecoach that stopped at the tavern further helped development. The initial location of Ellisburg was the crossroads of Cooper's Creek Road (now Route 70) and Haddonfield-Moorestown Road (King's Highway).

== Geography ==
According to the United States Census Bureau, the CDP had a total area of 0.905 square miles (2.344 km^{2}), all of which was land.

== Demographics ==
Historical population
Census	Pop.	Note	%±
2010	4,413		—
2020	4,601		4.3%
U.S. Decennial Census; 2010 2020

Ellisburg first appeared as a census designated place in the 2010 U.S. Census from part of the deleted Erlton-Ellisburg CDP.

=== Racial and ethnic composition ===
Ellisburg CDP, New Jersey – Racial and ethnic composition Note: the US Census treats Hispanic/Latino as an ethnic category. This table excludes Latinos from the racial categories and assigns them to a separate category. Hispanics/Latinos may be of any race.
Race / Ethnicity (NH = Non-Hispanic)	Pop 2010	Pop 2020	% 2010	% 2020
White alone (NH)	3,306	2,742	74.92%	59.60%
Black or African American alone (NH)	257	388	5.82%	8.43%
Native American or Alaska Native alone (NH)	0	12	0.00%	0.26%
Asian alone (NH)	510	695	11.56%	15.11%
Native Hawaiian or Pacific Islander alone (NH)	0	0	0.00%	0.00%
Other race alone (NH)	5	23	0.11%	0.50%
Mixed race or Multiracial (NH)	43	202	0.97%	4.39%
Hispanic or Latino (any race)	292	539	6.62%	11.71%
Total	4,413	4,601	100.00%	100.00%

=== 2020 census ===
As of the 2020 census, Ellisburg had a population of 4,601, with a median age of 43.3 years. 17.8% of residents were under the age of 18 and 22.1% were 65 years of age or older. For every 100 females there were 91.7 males, and for every 100 females age 18 and over there were 87.6 males.

100.0% of residents lived in urban areas, while 0.0% lived in rural areas.

There were 1,882 households in Ellisburg, of which 23.9% had children under the age of 18 living in them. Of all households, 40.7% were married-couple households, 21.5% were households with a male householder and no spouse or partner present, and 32.6% were households with a female householder and no spouse or partner present. About 38.3% of all households were made up of individuals and 20.8% had someone living alone who was 65 years of age or older.

There were 2,023 housing units, of which 7.0% were vacant. The homeowner vacancy rate was 1.9% and the rental vacancy rate was 8.2%.

=== 2010 census ===
The 2010 United States census counted 4,413 people, 1,898 households, and 1,080 families in the CDP. The population density was 4,876.9 per square mile (1,883.0/km^{2}). There were 1,976 housing units at an average density of 2,183.7 per square mile (843.1/km^{2}). The racial makeup was 78.36% (3,458) White, 6.23% (275) Black or African American, 0.07% (3) Native American, 11.67% (515) Asian, 0.00% (0) Pacific Islander, 2.29% (101) from other races, and 1.38% (61) from two or more races. Hispanic or Latino of any race were 6.62% (292) of the population.

Of the 1,898 households, 21.8% had children under the age of 18; 43.8% were married couples living together; 9.1% had a female householder with no husband present and 43.1% were non-families. Of all households, 39.2% were made up of individuals and 22.0% had someone living alone who was 65 years of age or older. The average household size was 2.26 and the average family size was 3.09.

18.8% of the population were under the age of 18, 7.1% from 18 to 24, 23.4% from 25 to 44, 25.6% from 45 to 64, and 25.2% who were 65 years of age or older. The median age was 45.6 years. For every 100 females, the population had 84.2 males. For every 100 females ages 18 and older there were 81.5 males.
