= Springdale Farms =

Farmers' market in New Jersey

Coordinates: 39.89101°N 74.96869°W

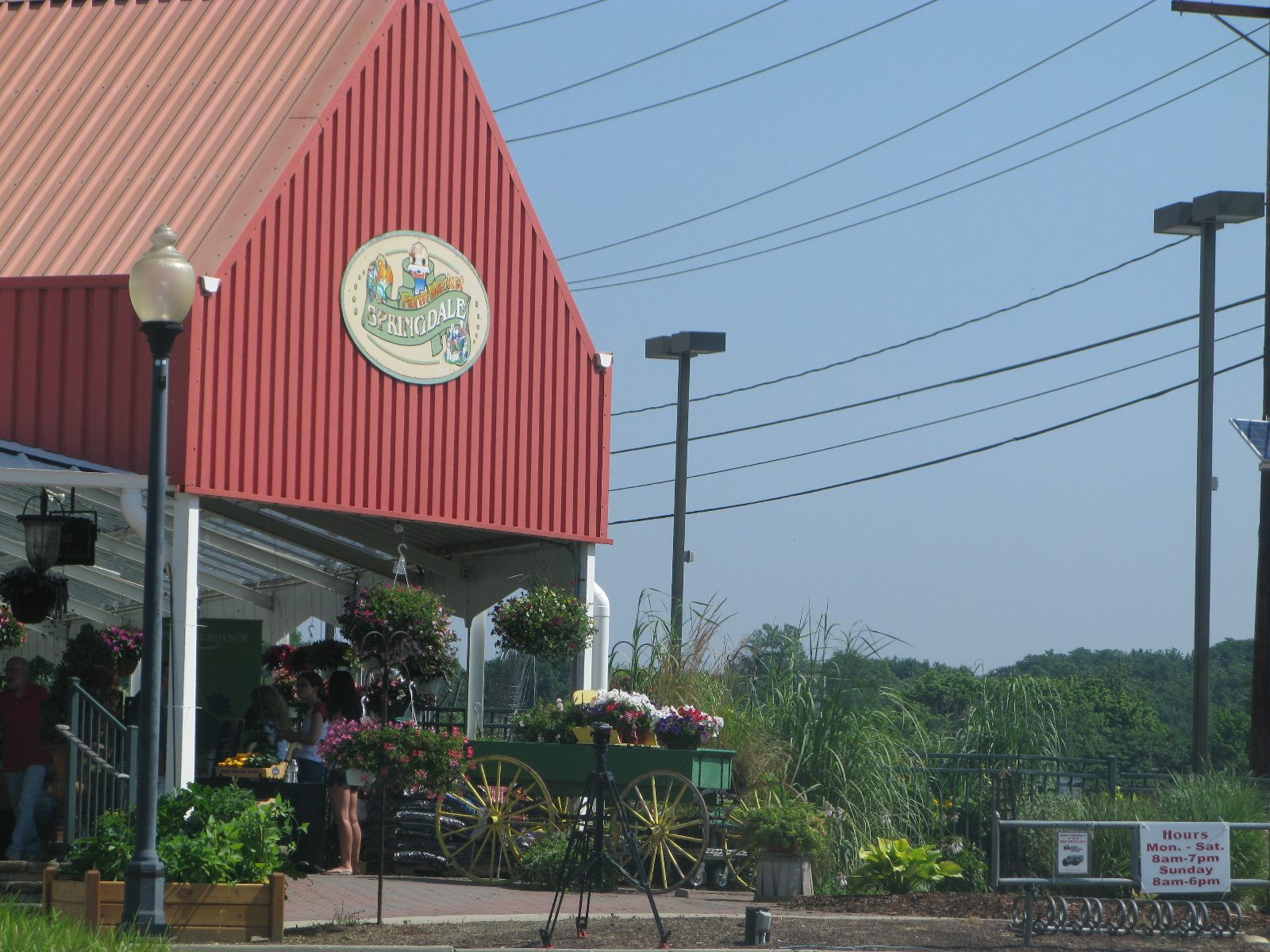
- Company type: Farmers' market
- Founded: 1949
- Headquarters: Cherry Hill, New Jersey, U.S.
- Website: springdalefarms.com

Springdale Farms is a family owned farmers' market located on Springdale Road in Cherry Hill, New Jersey, United States. It is currently Cherry Hill's only operational farm.

== History ==
Springdale Farms was founded in 1949 when Alan Ebert purchased the land. At the time, three quarters of Cherry Hill was farmland. Alan's widow, Mary, along with her children, took over operations of the 100-acre (40 ha) farm after his death. A fire in 1988 destroyed the farm's 3,800 square feet (350 m^{2}) retail building.

In late 1998, Springdale Road was widened from two lanes to four lanes, including a center left-turn lane. The construction claimed some of the farm's land and caused a detour that diverted traffic away from the farm, negatively affecting its business. In 1999, the farm expanded to add three greenhouses, totaling 9,600 square feet (890 m^{2}), where baked goods, crafts and other farm products are sold. In 2006, a fence was constructed in response to the significant number of deer in the forest area surrounding the farm.
