= Brian Willison =

American academic (born 1977)

Brian Willison (born May 6, 1977) is owner and senior IT consultant at B. Willison & Associates. He is the former executive director of the Parsons Institute for Information Mapping (PIIM) at The New School and program management officer at World Health Organization.

== Biography ==
=== Early life ===
Brian Willison was born in Moorestown, New Jersey. He attended the Moorestown Friends School (in Moorestown) in its Lower and Middle school programs. After transferring, Willison graduated from the Lawrenceville School (Lawrenceville, New Jersey) in 1995. He attended Washington University in St. Louis where he graduated with a bachelor's degree in fine arts and engineering in 1999. Willison received his master's degree from the Parsons School of Design in 2005. In 2012, he received an ExEd degree from MIT Sloan School of Management.

=== Career ===
Willison has worked in the fields of new media, publishing, marketing, and software development for companies located in St. Louis, Missouri, Philadelphia, Pennsylvania, San Francisco, California, and New York, New York. During the economic retraction following the Dot-com era, Willison launched a successful technology consulting practice which developed technologies for Charles Schwab, Microsoft, eBay, and AT&T.

As of November 2011, Willison is the executive director of the Parsons Institute for Information Mapping (PIIM) at The New School where he oversees PIIM's engagements in commercial and academic pursuits in the fields of knowledge visualization, information design, software development, geographic information systems (GIS), and electronic medical record (EMR) systems.

At the Parsons Institute for Information Mapping (PIIM), Willison has led technology programs for United States Government initiatives:

- Geospace and Media Tool (GMT) for the United States Congress
- Modular Integrated Knowledge System (MIKS) for the National Geospatial-Intelligence Agency
- Media File Generator (MFG) for the Department of Defense
- Human Organizational Network Generator (HONG) for the Department of Defense
- Georeferenced Information Visualization (GIV) for the Department of Defense
- Armed Forces Health Longitudinal Technology Application (AHLTA) Graphic User Interface redesign for the Department of Defense, Military Health System, and United States Army Medical Research and Materiel Command
- Visual Dashboard and Heads-Up Display of Patient Conditions for the Department of Defense, Military Health System, and United States Army Medical Research and Materiel Command

From 2011 to 2013, Willison worked at The Global Fund overseeing technology and implementation programs for the organization's financial disbursement review cycles with mechanisms attached to the various country programs in the fields of Aids, Malaria, and Tuberculosis.

From 2013 to 2014, Willison worked at the World Health Organization establishing the WHO ICT Global Governance framework. His work was implemented across all WHO ICT offices (HQ, Regional and Local Offices) in all countries served by the WHO.

From 2014 to 2021, Willison managed his consulting firm B. Willison & Associates. The firm's primary areas of focus were Information Technology, E-Commerce, Cloud Computing and Organizational Governance. Willison's firm led transformation programs in Switzerland and the United States - including work with the Work Economic Forum, Teva Pharmaceuticals, Medtronic, Leidos, Cenlar, and Bristol Myers Squibb.

=== Publications ===
- Iterative Milestone Engineering Model
- Visualization Driven Rapid Prototyping
- Advancing Meaningful Use: Simplifying Complex Clinical Metrics Through Visual Representation
