= Martha Zweig =

American poet

- Born: April 2, 1942 (age 84); Philadelphia, Pennsylvania, USA
- Education: University of Michigan; Warren Wilson College
- Writing career
- Genre: Poetry
- Notable work: Monkey Lightning (2010)
- Notable awards: Whiting Award (1999)

Martha M. Zweig (born April 2, 1942, in Philadelphia, Pennsylvania) is an American poet. Her most recent book is Snails of the Apocalypse (River River Books, 2026).

== Life ==
She was raised in Moorestown Township, New Jersey, where she attended the Quaker Moorestown Friends School. She earned her B.A. and an M.A.and a Hopwood Award from the University of Michigan; and an M.F.A. from Warren Wilson College. She lives in Hardwick, Vermont, She lives in Vermont where she worked ten years as an advocate for seniors, after ten years handling garments in a pajama factory where she served a term as International Ladies' Garment Workers Union (ILGWU) shop chair.

Her poems have appeared in literary journals and magazines including The Beloit Poetry Journal, Boston Review, Conduit, Field, Gettysburg Review, Indiana Review, The Journal, The Kenyon Review, Literary Imagination, Manoa, Notre Dame Review, New Orleans Review, The North American Review, Northwest Review, Paris Review, The Progressive, Willow Springs.

== Honors and awards ==
- 1999 Whiting Award

== Published works ==
Full-Length Poetry Collections

- Snails of the Apocalypse. River River Books. 2026. ISBN 979-8-9926116-6-3.
- Get Lost. Dream Horse Press. 2020. ISBN 978-1935716402.
- Monkey Lightning. Tupelo Press. 2010. ISBN 978-1-932195-82-8
- What Kind. Wesleyan University Press. 2003. ISBN 978-0-8195-6626-3.
- Vinegar Bone. Wesleyan University Press. 1999. ISBN 978-0-8195-6359-0.

Chapbooks

- Where the raw moonlight loafs: a collection of poems. Warren Wilson College. 1998.
- Powers. Vermont Council on the Arts. 1976. ISBN 978-0-916718-07-7.
