= Politz Day School of Cherry Hill =

Private Modern Orthodox Jewish day school in Cherry Hill, New Jersey, United States

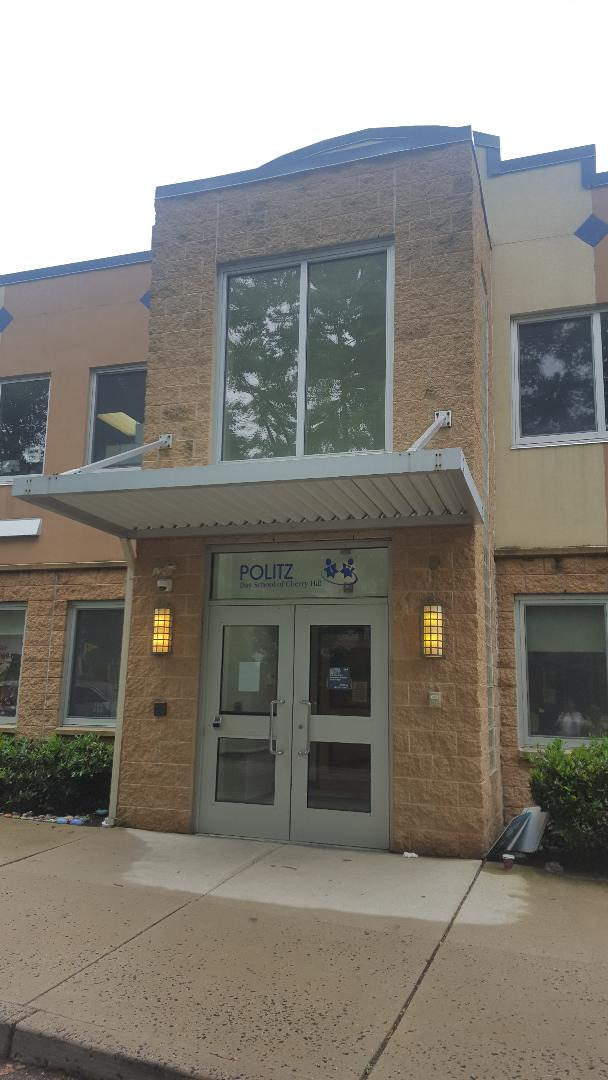
- Politz Day School of Cherry Hill, May 2018

Location
- 720 Cooper Landing Road; Cherry Hill, New Jersey 08002; United States
- 39.93277°N 75.01299°W

Information
- Type: Private Jewish day school
- Religious affiliation: Orthodox Judaism
- Established: 1968; 58 years ago
- Founder: Rabbi Bernard E. Rothman
- NCES School ID: AA890588
- President: Jenni Jimenez Fischman
- Administrator: Kristen Head
- Principal: Martha Mendoza
- Head of school: Rabbi Chaim Greenwald
- Faculty: 16.0 (on FTE basis)
- Grades: Preschool–8th
- Enrollment: 200 (2017-2018)
- Student to teacher ratio: 7.6:1
- Team name: Panthers
- Publication: Politz Press
- Website: www.politz.org

Politz Day School of Cherry Hill is a private modern orthodox Jewish day school in Cherry Hill, New Jersey which includes the Caskey Elementary School and Konig Middle School. The school shares a common campus with Congregation Sons of Israel in Cherry Hill.

Politz offers preschool (for children as young as eighteen months) through eighth grade with the mission that students learn in an environment combining the abundance of the Jewish religion with traditional secular education. The school serves families living in Cherry Hill, South Jersey, northern Delaware, and Philadelphia including the Main Line, Center City, and the Northeast. Rabbi Chaim Greenwald has served as Head of School beginning with the 2021–2022 academic year.

== History ==
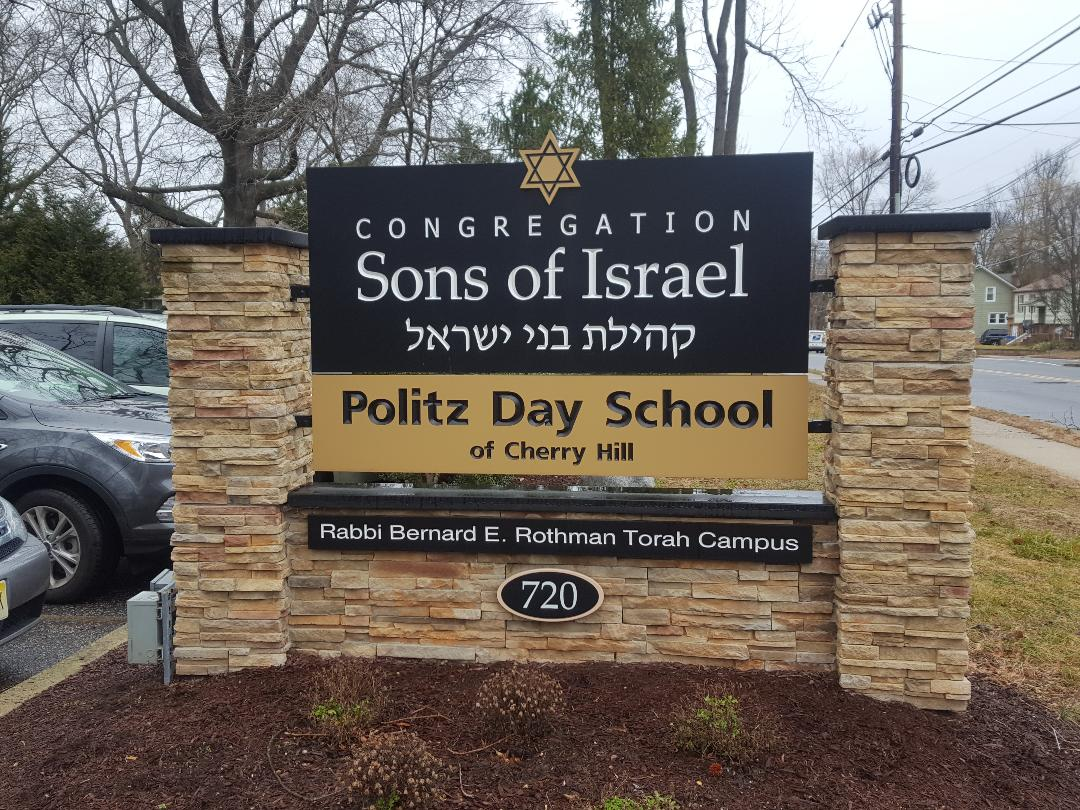
February 2020

Camden had a community Jewish Day School founded by Congregation Sons of Israel's Rabbi Naftoly Riff and Congregation Beth El's Rabbi Harry Kellman. This school closed in the 1950s. Orthodox families in South Jersey sent their children to school in Philadelphia in the 1960s and Cherry Hill was a growing community.

Rabbi Bernard Rothman founded Politz in Camden in 1968 with a small preschool. In 1969 it moved into a house on Cooper Landing Road in Cherry Hill which served as a Cherry Hill branch of Congregation Sons of Israel. Sons of Israel itself moved from Camden to Cherry Hill in 1971.

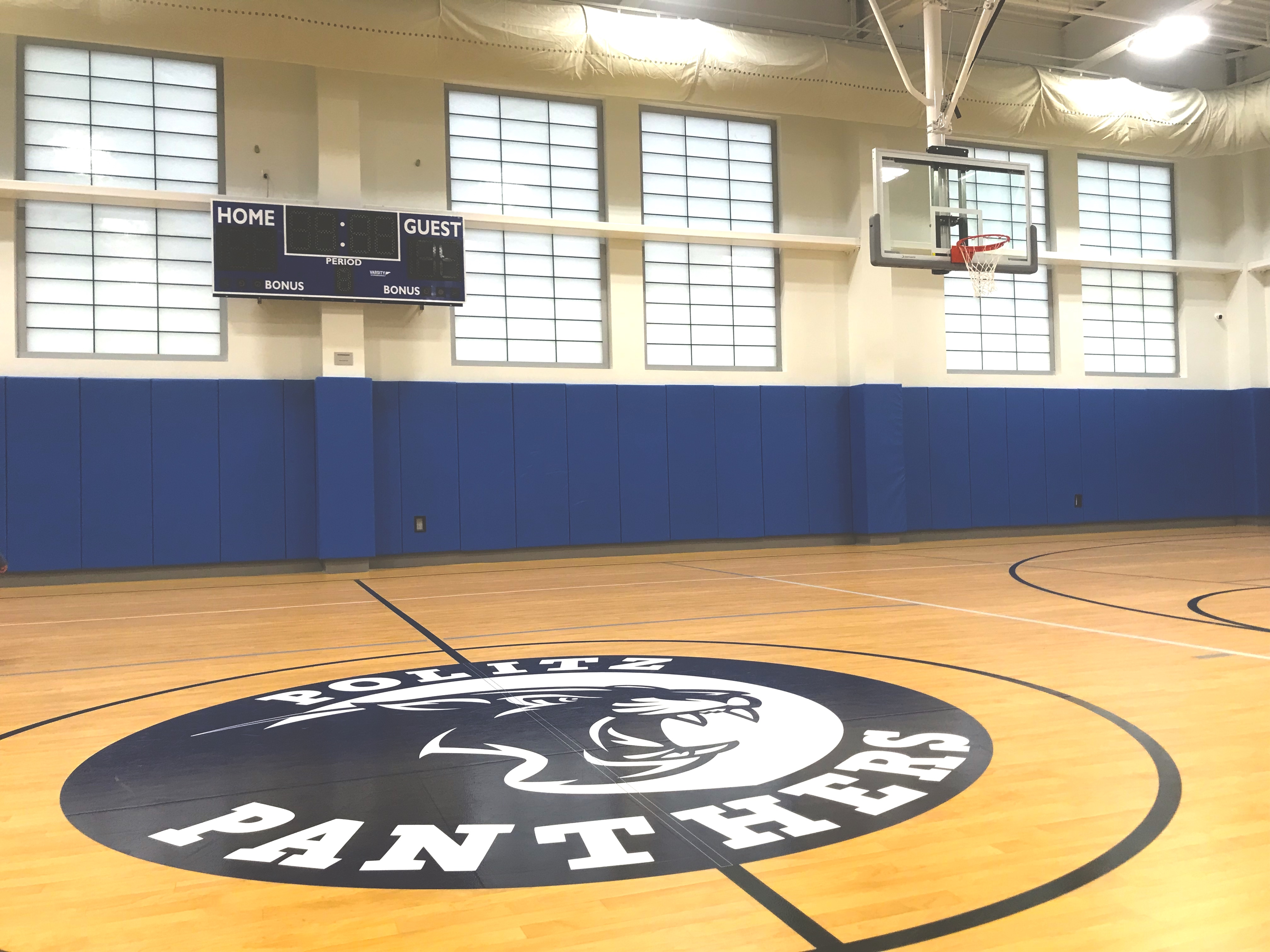
Krupnick Family Gymnasium, Politz Day School (December 2022)

Politz opened its elementary school in 1984 and added a middle school to eighth grade in 1994. The school grew from 25 students in 1987 to 100 students in 1997, and Politz raised $2.5 million to expand its classroom building.

Sons of Israel built an addition to its building in 2003 into which Politz moved in 2004. Politz began construction in October 2019 on a 7,500 square foot addition to its existing building to include additional classrooms, STEAM lab, kitchen, and gymnasium. The new classrooms and the Krupnick Family Gymnasium were dedicated and opened in December 2022.

Rabbi Avraham Glustein served as Head of School from 1996 through 2021.
