= Ashland, New Jersey =

Populated place in Camden County, New Jersey, US

- Census-designated place
- Map of Ashland CDP in Camden County. Inset: Location of Camden County in New Jersey.

- Location in Camden County Location in New Jersey Location in the United States
- Coordinates: 39.876228°N 75.008265°W
- Country: United States
- State: New Jersey
- County: Camden
- Township: Cherry Hill

Area
  - Total: 2.91 sq mi (7.54 km^{2})
  - Land: 2.91 sq mi (7.53 km^{2})
  - Water: 0.0039 sq mi (0.01 km^{2}) 0.19%
- Elevation: 72 ft (22 m)

Population (2020)
  - Total: 8,513
  - Density: 2,928.0/sq mi (1,130.52/km^{2})
- Time zone: UTC−05:00 (Eastern (EST))
  - Summer (DST): UTC−04:00 (EDT)
- ZIP Code: 08034 - Cherry Hill
- Area code: 856
- FIPS code: 34-01990
- GNIS feature ID: 02389152

Ashland is an unincorporated community and census-designated place (CDP) located within Cherry Hill, in Camden County, in the U.S. state of New Jersey. As of the 2020 census, Ashland had a population of 8,513.

== Geography ==
According to the United States Census Bureau, Ashland had a total area of 2.919 square miles (7.56 km^{2}), including 2.914 square miles (7.55 km^{2}) of land and 0.005 square miles (0.013 km^{2}) of water (0.19%).

== Demographics ==
Historical population
Census	Pop.	Note	%±
2000	8,375		—
2010	8,302		−0.9%
2020	8,513		2.5%
U.S. Decennial Census: 2000; 2010 2020

Ashland first appeared as a census designated place in the 2000 U.S. census created from part of the deleted Cherry Hill CDP.

=== Racial and ethnic composition ===
Ashland CDP, New Jersey – Racial and ethnic composition Note: the US Census treats Hispanic/Latino as an ethnic category. This table excludes Latinos from the racial categories and assigns them to a separate category. Hispanics/Latinos may be of any race.
Race / Ethnicity (NH = Non-Hispanic)	Pop 2000	Pop 2010	Pop 2020	% 2000	% 2010	% 2020
White alone (NH)	7,186	6,363	5,962	85.80%	76.64%	70.03%
Black or African American alone (NH)	358	547	585	4.27%	6.59%	6.87%
Native American or Alaska Native alone (NH)	18	7	8	0.21%	0.08%	0.09%
Asian alone (NH)	535	752	889	6.39%	9.06%	10.44%
Native Hawaiian or Pacific Islander alone (NH)	2	0	5	0.02%	0.00%	0.06%
Other race alone (NH)	8	12	30	0.10%	0.14%	0.35%
Mixed race or Multiracial (NH)	49	141	300	0.59%	1.70%	3.52%
Hispanic or Latino (any race)	219	480	734	2.61%	5.78%	8.62%
Total	8,375	8,302	8,513	100.00%	100.00%	100.00%

=== 2020 census ===
As of the 2020 census, Ashland had a population of 8,513. The median age was 43.6 years. 19.4% of residents were under the age of 18 and 21.0% of residents were 65 years of age or older. For every 100 females, there were 93.7 males, and for every 100 females age 18 and over, there were 90.1 males.

100.0% of residents lived in urban areas, while 0.0% lived in rural areas.

There were 3,269 households, of which 30.9% had children under the age of 18 living in them. Of all households, 55.8% were married-couple households, 12.4% were households with a male householder and no spouse or partner present, and 26.9% were households with a female householder and no spouse or partner present. About 23.9% of all households were made up of individuals and 13.0% had someone living alone who was 65 years of age or older.

There were 3,449 housing units, of which 5.2% were vacant. The homeowner vacancy rate was 2.3% and the rental vacancy rate was 5.2%.

=== 2010 census ===
The 2010 United States census counted 8,302 people, 3,084 households, and 2,224 families in the CDP. The population density was 2,849.1 people per square mile (1,100.0 people/km^{2}). There were 3,215 housing units at an average density of 1,103.3 units per square mile (426.0 units/km^{2}). The racial makeup was 80.28% (6,665) White, 7.03% (584) Black or African American, 0.11% (9) Native American, 9.06% (752) Asian, 0.00% (0) Pacific Islander, 1.26% (105) from other races, and 2.25% (187) from two or more races. Hispanic or Latino of any race were 5.78% (480) of the population.

Of the 3,084 households, 30.8% had children under the age of 18; 58.4% were married couples living together; 10.1% had a female householder with no husband present and 27.9% were non-families. Of all households, 23.8% were made up of individuals and 10.8% had someone living alone who was 65 years of age or older. The average household size was 2.62 and the average family size was 3.13.

21.9% of the population were under the age of 18, 6.7% from 18 to 24, 23.7% from 25 to 44, 28.9% from 45 to 64, and 18.7% who were 65 years of age or older. The median age was 43.4 years. For every 100 females, the population had 93.3 males. For every 100 females ages 18 and older there were 88.8 males.

=== 2000 census ===
As of the 2000 United States census there were 8,375 people, 3,115 households, and 2,317 families living in the CDP. The population density was 1,107.4 people/km^{2} (2,868 people/mi^{2}). There were 3,209 housing units at an average density of 424.3 units/km^{2} (1,099 units/mi^{2}). The racial makeup of the CDP was 87.67% White, 4.41% African American, 0.21% Native American, 6.39% Asian, 0.02% Pacific Islander, 0.59% from other races, and 0.72% from two or more races. Hispanic or Latino of any race were 2.61% of the population.

There were 3,115 households, out of which 31.5% had children under the age of 18 living with them, 62.7% were married couples living together, 8.7% had a female householder with no husband present, and 25.6% were non-families. 21.6% of all households were made up of individuals, and 10.2% had someone living alone who was 65 years of age or older. The average household size was 2.63 and the average family size was 3.10.

In the CDP the population was spread out, with 23.6% under the age of 18, 5.4% from 18 to 24, 28.3% from 25 to 44, 23.9% from 45 to 64, and 18.9% who were 65 years of age or older. The median age was 41 years. For every 100 females, there were 92.4 males. For every 100 females age 18 and over, there were 88.1 males.

The median income for a household in the CDP was $68,063, and the median income for a family was $75,232. Males had a median income of $51,113 versus $37,234 for females. The per capita income for the CDP was $28,936. About 2.8% of families and 4.6% of the population were below the poverty line, including 6.7% of those under age 18 and 3.5% of those age 65 or over.
