= Cherry Hill, New Jersey =

Township in Camden County, New Jersey, US

- Township
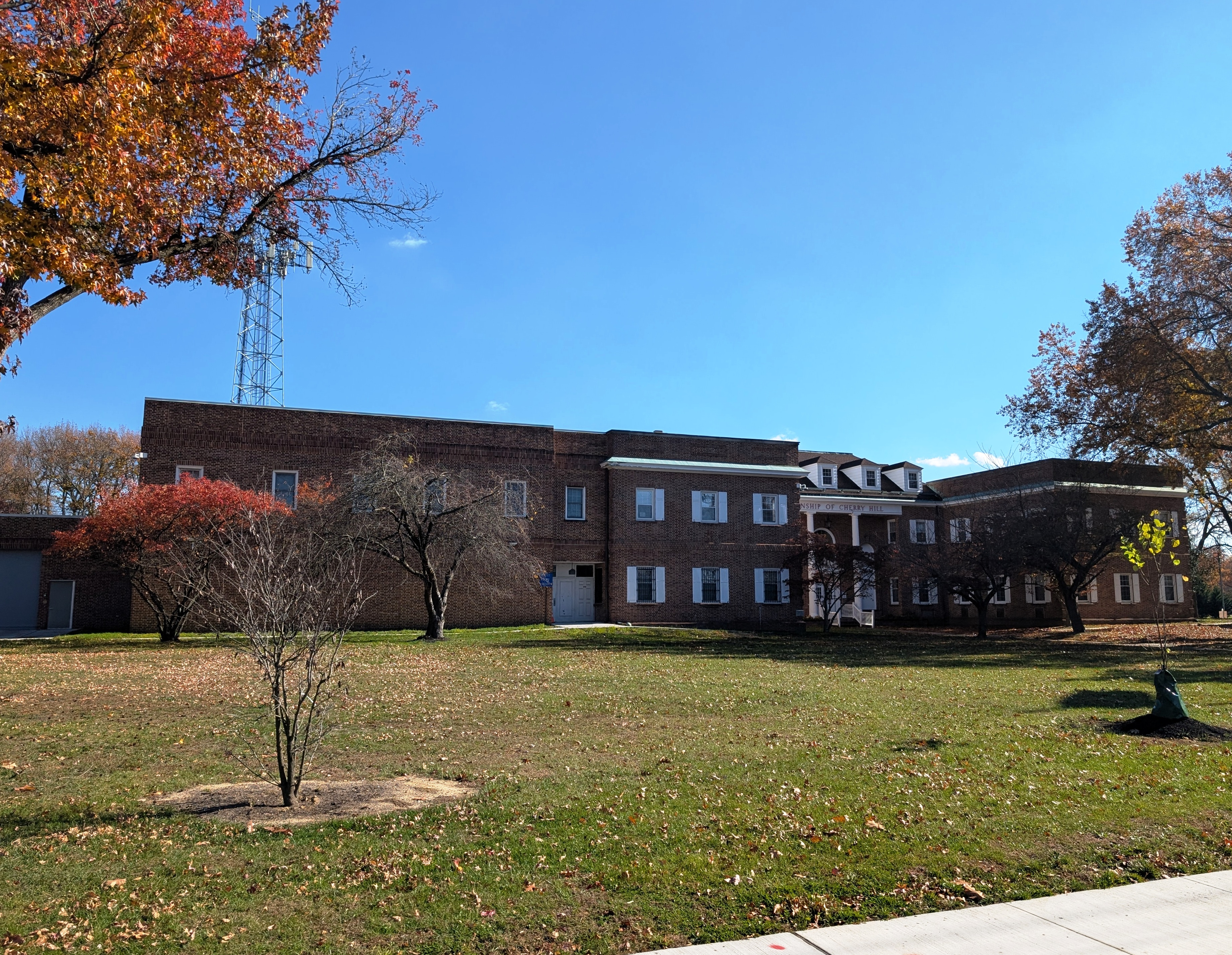
- The Cherry Hill municipal building

- Seal
- Motto: "You couldn't pick a better place"
- Interactive map of Cherry Hill, New Jersey
- Location in Camden County Location in New Jersey Location in the United States
- Coordinates: 39.904611°N 74.997°W
- Country: United States
- State: New Jersey
- County: Camden
- Incorporated: February 28, 1844, as Delaware Township
- Renamed: November 7, 1961, to Cherry Hill Township
- Named for: Cherry Hill farm

Government
  - Type: Faulkner Act Mayor-Council
  - Body: Township Council
  - Mayor: David Fleisher (D, term ends December 31, 2027)
  - Administrator: Brian Bauerle
  - Municipal clerk: Patti Chacker

Area
  - Total: 24.20 sq mi (62.67 km^{2})
  - Land: 24.07 sq mi (62.35 km^{2})
  - Water: 0.12 sq mi (0.32 km^{2}) 0.51%
  - Rank: 114th of 565 in state 3rd of 37 in county
- Elevation: 39 ft (12 m)

Population (2020)
  - Total: 74,553
  - Estimate (2026): 80,987
  - Rank: 12th of 565 in state 1st of 37 in county
  - Density: 3,364.6/sq mi (1,299.1/km^{2})
  - Rank: 213th of 565 in state 24th of 37 in county
- Time zone: UTC−05:00 (Eastern (EST))
  - Summer (DST): UTC−04:00 (EDT)
- ZIP Codes: 08002–08003, 08034
- Area code: 856
- FIPS code: 3400712280
- GNIS feature ID: 0882155
- Website: www.chnj.gov

Cherry Hill is a township within Camden County, in the U.S. state of New Jersey. As a suburb of Philadelphia, the township is part of South Jersey and the Philadelphia metropolitan area. Cherry Hill grew during the mid-20th century suburbanization, becoming one of the Delaware Valley's main commercial centers, including the Cherry Hill Mall. As of the 2020 United States census, the township's population was 74,553.

== History ==
The area now known as Cherry Hill was originally settled by the Lenni-Lenape Native Americans before being displaced by the first settlers from England, namely Quaker followers of William Penn who arrived in the late 17th century.

The first settlement was a small cluster of homes named Colestown, in the perimeters of what is now the Colestown Cemetery on the corner of Route 41 (King's Highway) and Church Road. The municipality was incorporated on February 25, 1844, at a town meeting as part of Gloucester County as Delaware Township from half of the area of Waterford Township and became part of Camden County at its creation some two weeks later on March 13, 1844. Portions of the township were taken to form Stockton Township (February 23, 1859) and Merchantville (March 3, 1874). At its territorial peak, Delaware Township included all of modern-day Cherry Hill, as well as the neighborhood of North Camden and the municipalities of Merchantville and Pennsauken Township (including Petty's Island in the Delaware River).

Ellisburg, named for the Ellis family who settled the area, served as the social and political hub of Delaware Township. Now located at the intersection of King's Highway and Route 70, Ellisburg grew to include a general store, a blacksmith, residential homes and a tavern. The tavern, founded by Isaac Ellis, would later be bought by John Ilg and renamed the Ellisburg Inn. The inn became a popular stagecoach shop until 1881, when the railroad between Philadelphia and Medford was completed. Ellisburg was also the home of Delaware Township's first school, the Ellisburg School, which was built in 1831. The school also hosted town meetings until 1885, when the first town hall was built. The inn, general store and school were demolished in 1938 to make room for the Ellisburg traffic circle.

Large family farms grew around Delaware Township in the 19th century, supplied by Haddonfield, Merchantville, Colestown and Ellisburg, and powered by mills such as the Kay-Evans mill at present-day Croft Farm. Much of the produce was grown for the Campbell's Soup company in Camden.

The township's population and economy boomed after World War II and continued to increase until the 1980s. Today, the municipality's population is stable, with new development generally occurring in pockets of custom luxury houses or through the rehabilitation and adaptive reuse of commercial and industrial areas.

=== Origin of the name ===
Cherry Hill was a 19th-century farm on Kaighn Avenue (Route 38), owned by Capt. Abraham M. Browning. The farm property, named Cherry Hill because of the cherry trees growing on the property, later became the Cherry Hill Inn (now an AMC Theatres Cherry Hill 24 movie theater complex), as well as an RCA office campus (now a shopping center with big-box retailers and Target), and today's Cherry Hill Towers and Cherry Hill Estates housing developments.

Adding to the prevalence of the Cherry Hill name and leading to the official name change from Delaware Township to Cherry Hill Township, developer Eugene Mori branded several properties using the name, starting with the Cherry Hill Inn and Cherry Hill Lodge hotels. Cherry Hill Shopping Center (now known as Cherry Hill Mall) opened in 1961 opposite the old Cherry Hill Farm site, featuring 75 stores within a single enclosed space.

When the township sought a new post office, another New Jersey municipality in Hunterdon County was using the name Delaware Township. The United States Postal Service insisted on a name change, suggesting "Deltown". Delaware Township mayors Christian Weber and John Gilmour pursued public write-in campaigns to select possible titles and chose Cherry Hill from suggestions that included Chapel Hill, Cherry Valley and Delaware City. The name "Cherry Hill" was chosen by the township's citizens in a non-binding referendum in 1961 and was officially adopted on November 7, 1961.

== Geography ==
According to the U.S. Census Bureau, the township had a total area of 24.20 square miles (62.67 km^{2}), including 24.07 square miles (62.35 km^{2}) of land and 0.12 square miles (0.32 km^{2}) of water (0.51%).

Ashland (2010 population of 8,302), Barclay (4,428), Cherry Hill Mall (14,171), Ellisburg (4,413), Golden Triangle (4,145), Greentree (11,367), Kingston Estates (5,685) and Springdale (14,518) are unincorporated communities and census-designated places (CDPs) located within the township.

Other unincorporated communities, localities, neighborhoods, and place names located partially or completely within the township include Coffins Corner, Colwick, Cooperstown, Deer Park, Erlton, Freeman, Greenbrier, Huttons Hill, Locust Grove, Old Orchard, Point of Woods, Willowdale and Woodcrest.

The township's eastern border with Burlington County is defined by the Pennsauken Creek. The creek separates Cherry Hill from the communities of Maple Shade Township, Evesham Township, and Mount Laurel. The Cooper River forms the southern border with Collingswood, Haddon Township, Haddonfield, Lawnside and Somerdale, through the Maria Barnaby Greenwald Park and parallel to the east-west Route 70. To the north, Cherry Hill borders Merchantville and Pennsauken Township, while Voorhees Township shares its southern border along County Route 544 (Evesham Road).

== Demographics ==
Historical population
Census	Pop.	Note	%±
1850	2,577		—
1860	1,602	*	−37.8%
1870	1,625		1.4%
1880	1,481	*	−8.9%
1890	1,457		−1.6%
1900	1,679		15.2%
1910	1,706		1.6%
1920	2,331		36.6%
1930	5,734		146.0%
1940	5,811		1.3%
1950	10,358		78.2%
1960	31,522		204.3%
1970	64,395		104.3%
1980	68,785		6.8%
1990	69,348		0.8%
2000	69,965		0.9%
2010	71,045		1.5%
2020	74,553		4.9%
2023 (est.)	77,317		3.7%
Population sources:1850–2000 1850–1920 1850–1870; 1850 1870 1880–1890; 1890–1910 1910–1930 1940–2000; 2000 2010 2020 * = Lost territory in previous decade.

Since 2010, the population increased after several decades of slow growth. As of 2020, the township was the state's 12th most populous municipality, and the largest in Camden County, after having been the state's 14th most-populous municipality and the county's second largest in the 2010 Census, having surpassed both Brick Township, as well as nearby Camden, within the previous decade, and was ranked 13th in 2000. The Asian American population in Cherry Hill is experiencing rapid growth, increasing by 25% from 7,661 in 2010 to 9,587 in the 2013–2017 American Community Survey, compared to 0.3% growth for the township as a whole during the same period. An extensive array of businesses owned by Korean Americans has emerged along Marlton Pike (Route 70) in Cherry Hill since 2010, with signage in Hangul ubiquitous along this stretch.

=== Racial and ethnic composition ===
Cherry Hill township, Camden County, New Jersey – Racial and ethnic composition Note: the US Census treats Hispanic/Latino as an ethnic category. This table excludes Latinos from the racial categories and assigns them to a separate category. Hispanics/Latinos may be of any race.
Race / Ethnicity (NH = Non-Hispanic)	Numbers			Percentages		
Race / Ethnicity (NH = Non-Hispanic)	2000	2010	2020	2000	2010	2020
White alone (NH)	58,165	53,283	49,118	83.13%	75.00%	65.88%
Black or African American alone (NH)	3,020	4,161	5,272	4.32%	5.86%	7.07%
Native American or Alaska Native alone (NH)	61	56	48	0.09%	0.08%	0.06%
Asian alone (NH)	6,178	8,259	10,668	8.83%	11.63%	14.31%
Native Hawaiian or Pacific Islander alone (NH)	17	9	19	0.02%	0.01%	0.03%
Other race alone (NH)	54	87	406	0.08%	0.12%	0.54%
Mixed race or Multiracial (NH)	692	1,185	2,584	0.99%	1.67%	3.47%
Hispanic or Latino (any race)	1,778	4,005	6,438	2.54%	5.64%	8.64%
Total	69,965	71,045	74,553	100.00%	100.00%	100.00%

=== 2010 census ===
The 2010 United States census counted 71,045 people, 26,882 households, and 19,301 families in the township. The population density was 2,948.3 per square mile (1,138.3/km^{2}). There were 28,452 housing units at an average density of 1,180.7 per square mile (455.9/km^{2}). The racial makeup was 78.06% (55,459) White, 6.14% (4,360) Black or African American, 0.11% (78) Native American, 11.69% (8,304) Asian, 0.02% (13) Pacific Islander, 1.83% (1,302) from other races, and 2.15% (1,529) from two or more races. Hispanic or Latino of any race were 5.64% (4,005) of the population.

Of the 26,882 households, 31.2% had children under the age of 18; 58.6% were married couples living together; 9.6% had a female householder with no husband present and 28.2% were non-families. Of all households, 24.2% were made up of individuals and 11.6% had someone living alone who was 65 years of age or older. The average household size was 2.60 and the average family size was 3.12.

23.0% of the population were under the age of 18, 6.7% from 18 to 24, 23.1% from 25 to 44, 29.5% from 45 to 64, and 17.7% who were 65 years of age or older. The median age was 43.1 years. For every 100 females, the population had 92.2 males. For every 100 females ages 18 and older there were 88.4 males.

The Census Bureau's 2006–2010 American Community Survey showed that (in 2010 inflation-adjusted dollars) median household income was $88,183 (with a margin of error of +/− $2,748) and the median family income was $105,786 (+/− $2,321). Males had a median income of $72,128 (+/− $2,699) versus $48,937 (+/− $3,321) for females. The per capita income for the township was $41,252 (+/− $1,504). About 3.0% of families and 4.2% of the population were below the poverty line, including 3.9% of those under age 18 and 5.9% of those age 65 or over.

=== 2000 census ===
As of the 2000 U.S. census, there were 69,965 people, 26,227 households, and 19,407 families residing in the township. The population density was 2,884.9 inhabitants per square mile (1,113.9/km^{2}). There were 27,074 housing units at an average density of 1,116.4 per square mile (431.0/km^{2}). The racial makeup of the township was 84.67% White, 8.87% Asian, 4.46% African American, 0.10% Native American, 0.03% Pacific Islander, 0.70% from other races, and 1.16% from two or more races. Hispanic or Latino of any race were 2.54% of the population.

There were 26,227 households, out of which 32.1% had children under the age of 18 living with them, 62.8% were married couples living together, 8.3% had a female householder with no husband present, and 26.0% were non-families. 22.5% of all households were made up of individuals, and 11.0% had someone living alone who was 65 years of age or older. The average household size was 2.61 and the average family size was 3.08.

In the township, the population was spread out, with 23.5% under the age of 18, 5.4% from 18 to 24, 26.4% from 25 to 44, 26.6% from 45 to 64, and 18.0% who were 65 years of age or older. The median age was 42 years. For every 100 females, there were 91.6 males. For every 100 females age 18 and over, there were 87.2 males.

According to a 2010 estimate, the median income for a household in the township was $87,392, and the median income for a family was $104,983. Males had a median income of $82,325 versus $49,129 for females. The per capita income for the township was $43,192. About 2.6% of families and 4.7% of the population were below the poverty line, including 5.8% of those under age 18 and 9.7% of those age 65 or over.

== Climate ==
Cherry Hill features a temperate, humid subtropical climate, with mild winters, and receives approximately 58% of total possible sunshine annually. However, the weather is subject to changeable conditions. Occasional ice and significant snowfall usually melt within hours to days of falling. Summers are long, hot, and humid. The area can feel effects from Atlantic tropical storms. Precipitation is plentiful in all seasons.

Climate data for Cherry Hill
Month	Jan	Feb	Mar	Apr	May	Jun	Jul	Aug	Sep	Oct	Nov	Dec	Year
Mean daily maximum °F (°C)	41 (5)	46 (8)	55 (13)	66 (19)	76 (24)	86 (30)	88 (31)	86 (30)	79 (26)	68 (20)	56 (13)	46 (8)	66 (19)
Mean daily minimum °F (°C)	23 (−5)	25 (−4)	32 (0)	41 (5)	50 (10)	60 (16)	65 (18)	63 (17)	56 (13)	44 (7)	36 (2)	28 (−2)	44 (6)
Average precipitation inches (mm)	3.90 (99)	2.95 (75)	4.17 (106)	4.02 (102)	4.36 (111)	3.93 (100)	4.84 (123)	5.18 (132)	4.17 (106)	3.53 (90)	3.51 (89)	3.69 (94)	48.25 (1,227)

== Economy ==
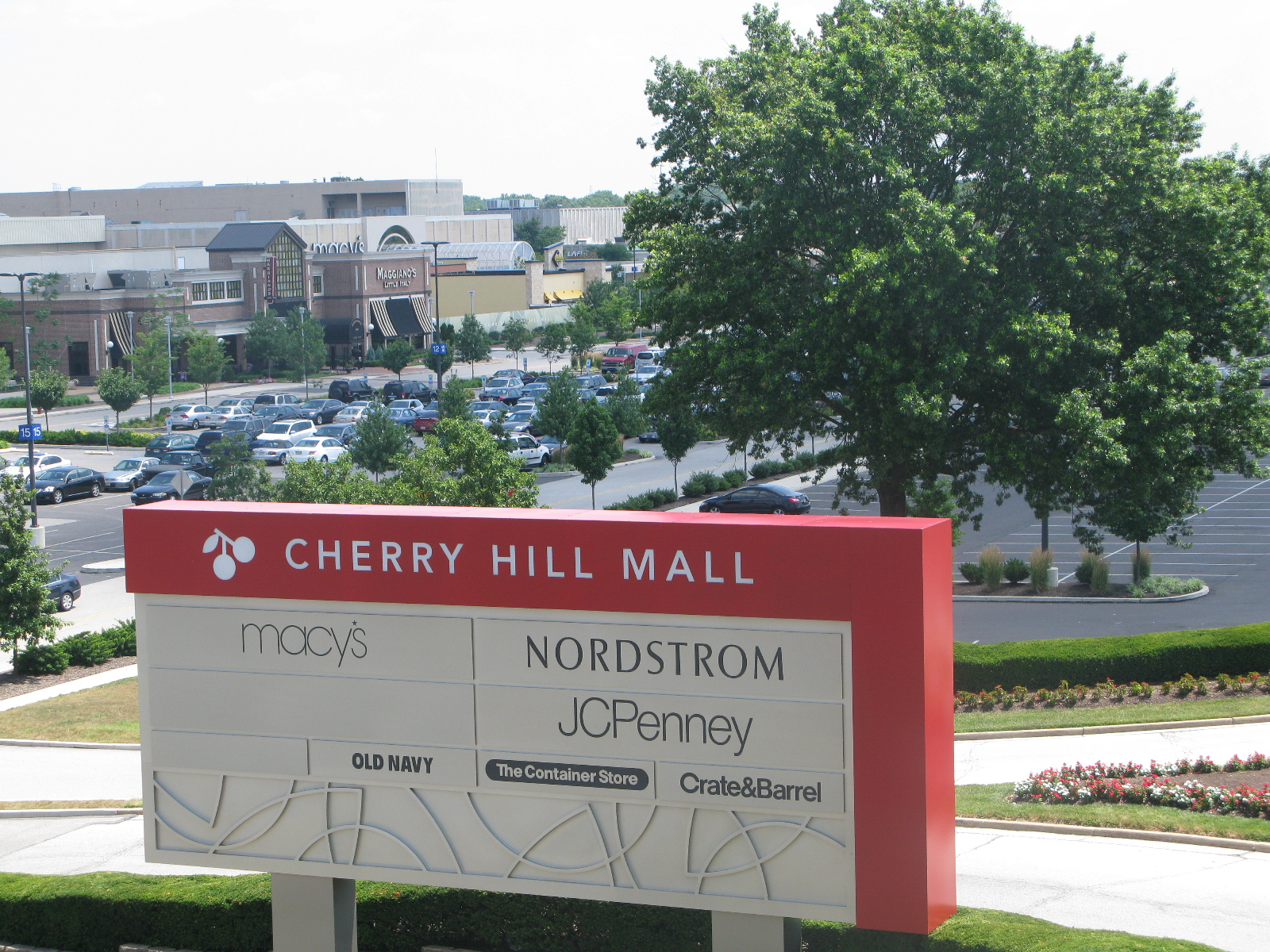
The Cherry Hill Mall is one of the largest retail complexes in the Philadelphia metropolitan area.

Cherry Hill is a corporate and employment hub. The township is the headquarters of TD Bank, N.A., whose US$350 billion in deposits in 2021 made it the eighth-largest American bank by deposits. On February 28, 2022, TD Bank, N.A. announced plans to acquire Memphis, Tennessee–based First Horizon Corp for US$13.4 billion. The combined entity will be based in Cherry Hill, and will constitute a Top 6 US bank. The deal is expected to close in 2023, pending approval by regulators in both the United States and Canada. The post-merger bank will have approximately US$600 billion in assets.

Melitta USA has its coffee roasting plant in the township. The Courier-Post, the fifth-largest New Jersey–based newspaper, is published in Cherry Hill. Subaru of America's headquarters was also located in the township until 2018. Cherry Hill Mall, a principal shopping center in the Philadelphia metropolitan area, was the first enclosed shopping mall in the eastern United States, opening in October 1961.

Many residents of Cherry Hill also work elsewhere. Cherry Hill is an edge city within a half-hour commute to Philadelphia, Camden, Trenton or Princeton.

=== Food and dining ===
Chick's Deli is a deli best known for hoagies and cheesesteaks, notable for having a single retail location, which is in Cherry Hill. Marlton Pike also features numerous Korean restaurants.

== In popular culture ==
- "Cherry Hill Park", a 1969 hit song by Billy Joe Royal, takes its title from Cherry Hill. Royal came up with the title after a friend mentioned seeing Cherry Hill on a visit to Philadelphia. The song appears on a 1969 album also titled Cherry Hill Park.
- The 86th episode of the crime drama Criminal Minds, "A Shade of Gray", which aired on April 22, 2009, was set in Cherry Hill.
- The Latin Casino was a nightclub that showcased popular entertainers from the time it relocated to Cherry Hill in 1960 until it was demolished in the early 1980s. Singer Jackie Wilson suffered a heart attack at the club in 1975.
- In the movie Harold & Kumar Go to White Castle, Cherry Hill is the location of the White Castle franchise Harold and Kumar ultimately visit. There are, in fact, no White Castle locations in Cherry Hill, nor does the movie's representation of Cherry Hill accurately reflect the dense, suburban nature of the town or its proximity to Philadelphia. Rather, it depicts Cherry Hill as rural farmland.
- In the movie The Freshman, Clark Kellogg (Matthew Broderick) is sent to Cherry Hill to deliver a Komodo dragon.

== Community ==
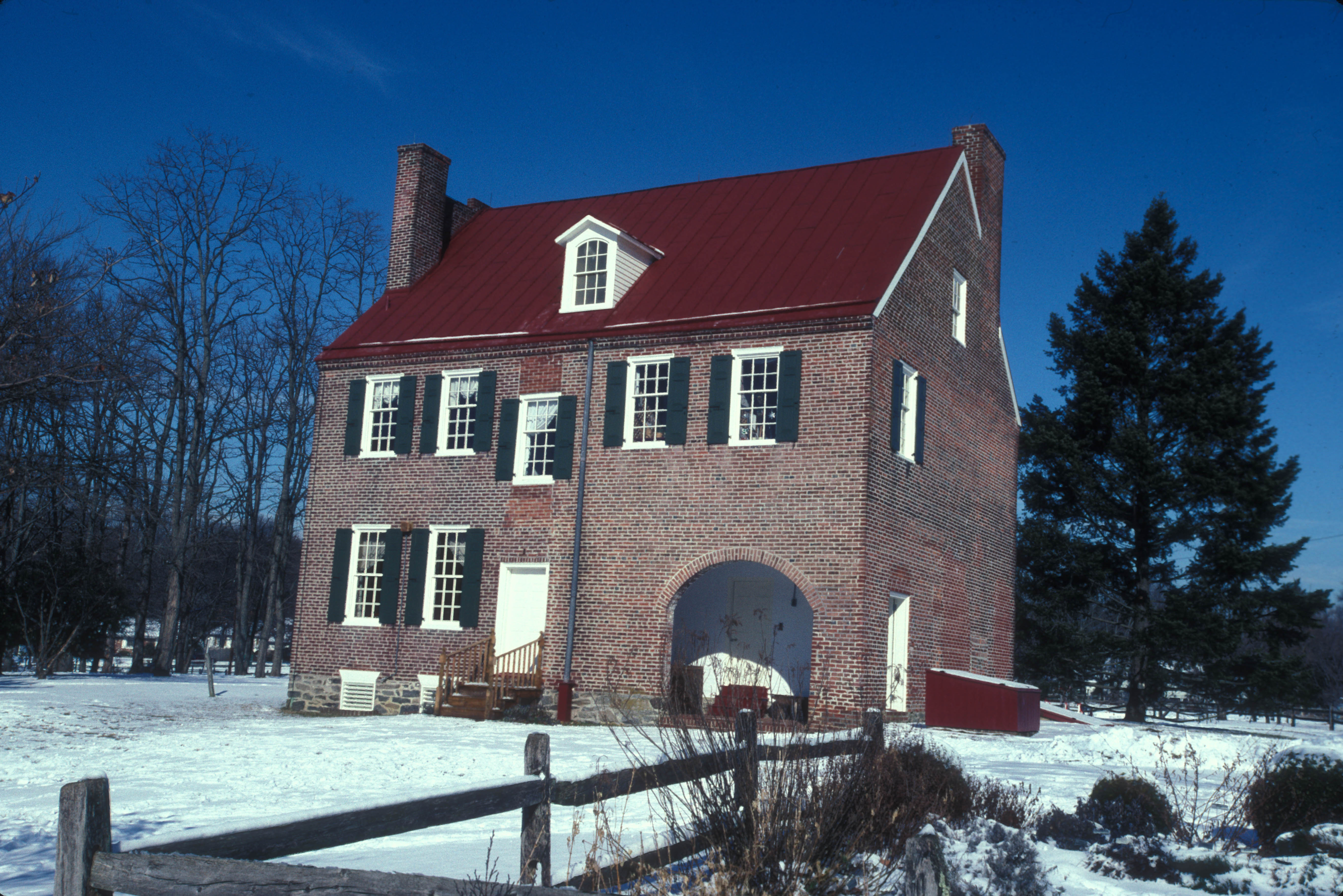
Barclay Farm House, built in 1816 and added to the U.S. National Register of Historic Places in 1978

- The Carol Neulander murder occurred in Cherry Hill. Rabbi Fred Neulander was convicted of paying two men to carry out a "hit" on his wife Carol Neulander, who was murdered in the family home in the Old Orchard Neighborhood in 1994. He was sentenced to a prison term of 30 years to life and served his sentence at the Trenton State prison until his death in 2024.
- Springdale Farms is Cherry Hill's only working farm on both sides of Springdale Road south of Route 70, receiving massive property tax breaks as it is zoned agricultural.
- Barclay Farm House, a farm house constructed in 1816 and listed on the National and New Jersey registers of historic places.
- Cherry Hill was the home of four of the five members of the Fort Dix 5, who were convicted in federal court in Camden on December 22, 2008, on a plot to kill soldiers at Fort Dix. The Cherry Hill members are Dritan Duka, 30, Shain Duka, 27, and Eljvir Duka, 25, as well as Mohamad Ibrahim Shnewer, 23. Ages were at the time of conviction.

== Sports ==
In 1973–1974, the Cherry Hill Arena hosted a WHA hockey team, the New Jersey Knights, and from 1964 to 1971, an Eastern Hockey League team, the Jersey Devils (unrelated to the present NHL New Jersey Devils).

Muhammad Ali purchased a house at 1121 Winding Drive in Cherry Hill's Voken Tract in 1971, living there with his family until 1974.

Leon Rose, GM of the New York Knicks was born in Cherry Hill. He played basketball at the Cherry Hill High School East and is a member of the school's hall of fame.

== Parks and recreation ==
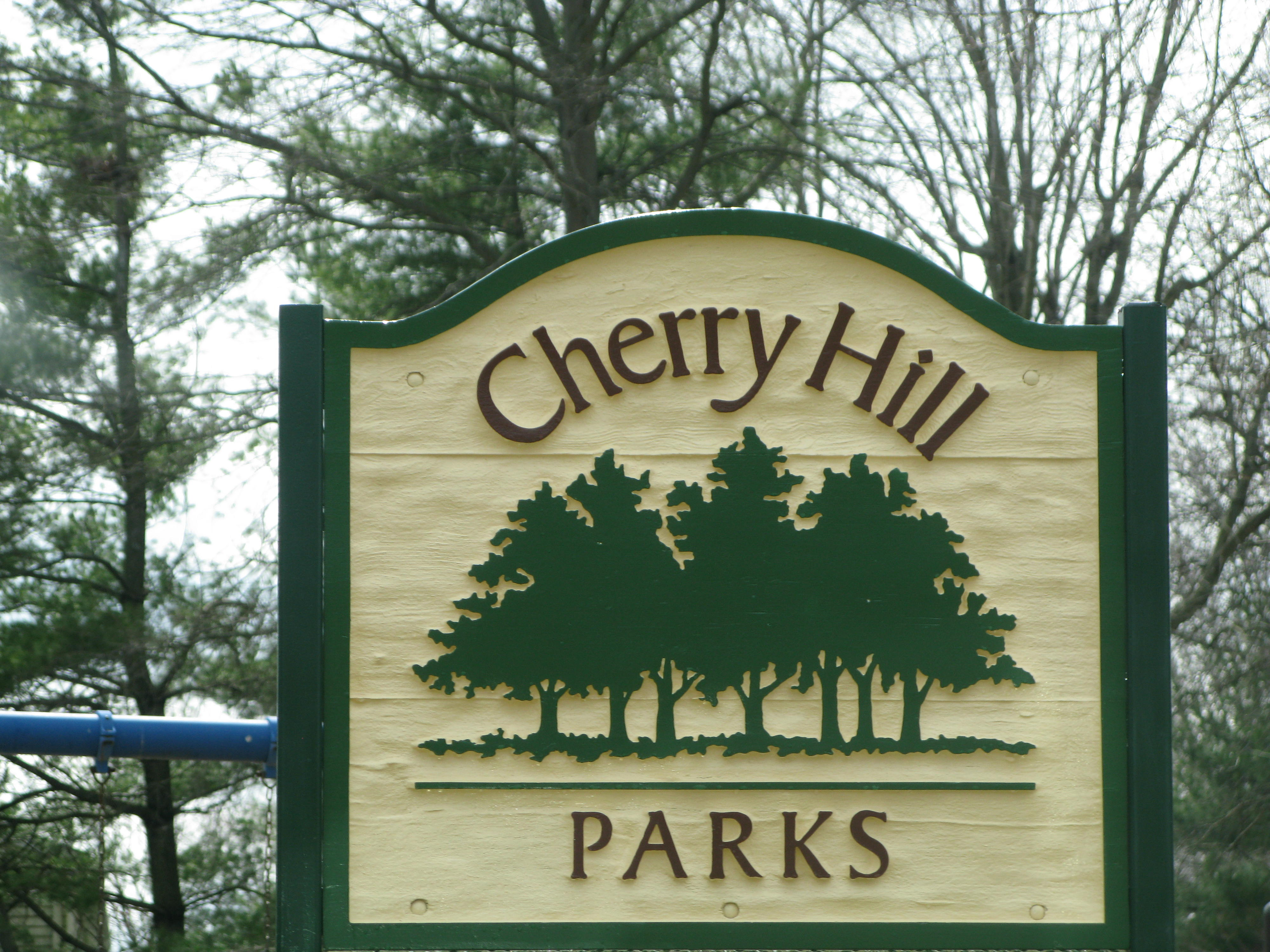
Signage for Cherry Hill Parks

Cherry Hill has more than 50 municipal public parks, plus three parks owned by Camden County. Most parks have playground equipment, basketball courts, tennis courts, walking paths, and athletic fields.

Croft Farm, which was originally a working mill and farm, was built in 1753 and is a historic landmark in Cherry Hill. The farmhouse underwent many changes throughout the years, including an expansion in 1816. The property was sold to the township in 1985 and transformed into the Cherry Hill Arts Center in 1995, which serves the community for art classes, seminars, and concerts produced by the Cherry Hill Recreation Department.

Toward the last two weeks of April, one can see a two-mile avenue of continuous rows of cherry blossoms on Chapel Avenue between Haddonfield Road and Kings Highway. The avenue of cherry blossoms was conceived by a group of residents who wanted to unify the townspeople of Cherry Hill to participate in a community-wide celebration of the diverse community of Cherry Hill. This effort started in 1972 and cherry trees are still being planted every year by the Cherry Hill Fire Department and community volunteers.

=== Golf courses ===
Merchantville Country Club is a private nine-hole country club in Cherry Hill established in 1892. Woodcrest Country Club is a private 18-hole golf course located in the Woodcrest section. The course was founded in 1929 as a 9-hole course. An additional 9 holes were added in 1931. It was sold at a bankruptcy auction in spring 2013, and is a private club as of 2020.

== Emergency services ==
=== Police ===
The Cherry Hill Police Department (CHPD) is the third-largest police department in the tri-county area, employing more than 130 sworn officers as well as 21 civilians. The current chief of the department is Robert Kempf. The department's TRT (Tactical Response Team) responds to requests for the service of high risk warrants, the resolving of barricaded and/or hostage situations, and dealing with suicidal individuals just to name a few of their assignments. TRT responds to requests for mutual aid throughout the tri-county area as needed. CHPD is home to its own 9-1-1 public safety answering point (PSAP), when a resident of the township dials 9-1-1 they are routed directly to the CHPD, which provides a significant advantage in response time to the caller, the 9-1-1 center is the hub of the department's 800 MHz trunked radio system, as well as an advanced CAD (Computer Aided Dispatch) system, and RMS (Records Management System). Both systems work together to provide patrol units up to date information directly to their patrol car computers. CHPD's Community Policing Unit provides many services for residents including child fingerprinting, neighborhood watches, and drug & alcohol awareness seminars.

=== Fire Department and EMS ===
The Cherry Hill Fire Department is a career department. It also has two volunteer support units, the Cherry Hill Fire Police and the Special Services Unit ("Rehab 13"), which provides on scene support for the Cherry Hill Fire Department as well as departments throughout Southern New Jersey. From December 2016 until 2022, the department had an ISO Class 1 designation by the Insurance Services Office, a classification held by 130 of the 30,000 fire departments in the US, and only three in New Jersey. It currently has an ISO Class 2 rating. Also in 2016, the department was accredited by the Center for Fire Accreditation International (CFAI).

The department also provides emergency medical services (EMS). The only hospital in Cherry Hill is Jefferson Cherry Hill Hospital, an extension of Philadelphia's Jefferson Health, located on Chapel Avenue. Residents also have access to nearby Virtua Hospitals in Voorhees Township, Marlton and Berlin as well as Cooper University Hospital and Our Lady of Lourdes Medical Center in Camden.

Fire stations in the township are:

- CHFD Station 2 (former Erlton Fire Co.) located at Rt 70 near Wesley Ave. Houses Ladder 13-24, BLS 13-97. Career.
- CHFD Station 3 & Headquarters (former headquarters Deer Park Fire Co.) located at 1100 Marlkress Rd off Rt 70. Built in 1972 & replaced in 2010. Houses Rescue-Ladder 13, USAR 13, Marine 13, BLS 13-93, EMS 13 & Battalion 13. Career.
- CHFD Station 4 (former Ashland Fire Co. No. 2 substation) located at 1000 Springdale Rd. Station renovated & expanded in 2009. Houses Engine 13-42. Career.
- CHFD Station 5 (former Church Road Fire Co.) located at Rt 38 & Church Rd. Houses Engine 13-52, BLS 13-95. Career.
- CHFD Station 6 (former Woodcrest Fire Co.) located at Burnt Mill Rd & Haddonfield-Berlin Rd. Built in 1967 & replaced in 2010. Houses Squad 13, Hazmat 13, BLS 13-96 & vehicle maintenance shop. Career.
- CHFD Station 22 located at N. Kings Hwy & Chelten Pkwy. Built 2005. Houses Engine 13-22, Foam 13, BLS 13-92. Career.
- Cherry Hill Fire Police (former Ashland Fire Co. No. 2 & Fire Admin Bldg) located 3rd Ave & Burnt Mill Rd. Volunteers.
- Deer Park Fire Company - Rehab 13 (built, owned & maintained by Deer Park Fire Co, a 501(c)3 charitable organization) located at 985 Cropwell Rd. Built in 1968 with outbuildings added in 1990 & 2014. Volunteers.

=== Civil Air Patrol ===
The Jack Schweiker Composite Squadron, located at the Cherry Hill Army National Guard Armory is the Cherry Hill component of the Civil Air Patrol, a Congressionally chartered, federally supported, non-profit corporation that serves as the official civilian auxiliary of the United States Air Force. The Squadron has about 60 members, 40 of which are cadets and 20 of which are senior members.

== Public library ==
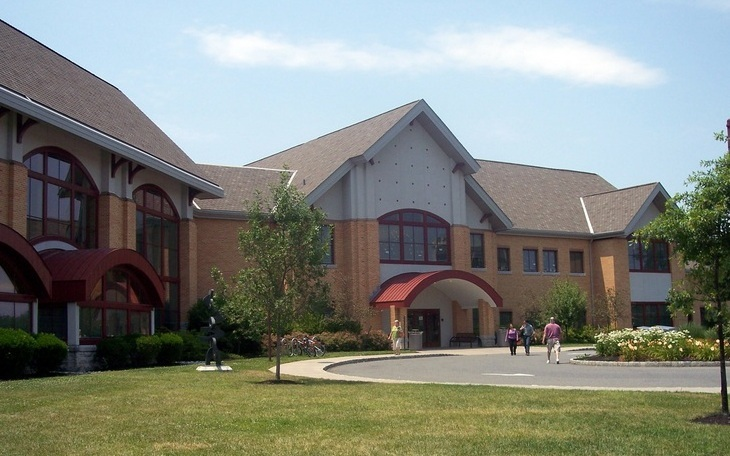
The new library building which was completed in 2004.

At 72,000 square feet (6,700 m^{2}), the Cherry Hill Public Library is among the largest municipal libraries in New Jersey. The current facility was completed in December 2004 to replace the 1966 Malcolm Wells-designed structure at 1100 King's Highway North. The library is an agency of the Township's municipal government.

== Government ==
=== Local government ===
Created as Delaware Township in 1844, the community was first governed by a Township Committee. On May 19, 1951, the citizens adopted, in a special election, a Walsh Act Commission form of government, consisting of a three-member Board of Commissioners. In 1962, the Township's population passed the 30,000 mark and two additional Commissioners were elected. Following a study made by a Citizen's Advisory Committee, a special election was held in 1962. The township voted to change its form of government to the Council-Manager Plan A under the Faulkner Act. Five Council members were elected at-large in a May election to serve concurrent four-year terms. The Council members elected one of their own as Mayor, and a Township Manager served as the Chief Administrator of the Township.

By 1975, after a Charter Study Commission report and the passage of a ballot referendum, the township adopted the Council-Manager Plan B form of government. Two features of the government were changed: council members were to be elected every two years for overlapping terms of four years and the number of Council members would increase from five to seven.

After a 1981 referendum, the government changed yet again, this time to a Mayor-Council Plan B form of government. The township is one of 71 municipalities (of the 564) statewide that use this form of government. The governing body is comprised of a full-time 'strong' mayor who is elected directly by the people and seven council members who are elected at-large for staggered four-year terms, with either three or four seats up for election in odd-numbered years. After the passage of a ballot referendum in November 1986, voting or the mayor and council was shifted from a non-partisan May election to a partisan November election.

As of 2026, the Mayor of Cherry Hill is Democrat David Fleisher, whose term of office ends December 31, 2027. Members of the Township Council are Council President William Carter (D, 2025), Council Vice President Michele Golkow (D, 2027), Jennifer Apell (D, 2027), William A. Carter III (D, 2029), Rob Connor (D, 2029), Sangeeta Doshi (D, 2029) and Jill Hulnick (D, 2029).

In January 2024, the Township Council selected Jill Hulnick to fill the council seat expiring in December 2027 that became vacant when David Fleisher took office as mayor and appointed Daniel DiRenzo to fill the seat expiring in December 2025 that was vacated after Brian Baurele resigned to take the position as the mayor's chief of staff; both will serve on an interim basis until the November 2024 general election, when voters will choose candidates to serve the balance of the two terms of office.

In January 2016, the Township Council selected Carolyn Jacobs from a list of three candidates nominated by the Democratic municipal committee to fill the seat expiring in December 2017 that became vacant when Susan Shin Angulo took office as a Camden County Freeholder.

N. John Amato, whose 30 years of service made him the township's longest-serving council member, died in office in September 2014. At a special council meeting in October 2014, Brian Bauerle was selected to fill Amato's seat, which expired in December 2015.

=== Federal, state and county representation ===
Cherry Hill is located in the 1st Congressional District and is part of New Jersey's 6th state legislative district. Prior to the 2010 Census, Cherry Hill had been part of the 3rd Congressional District, a change made by the New Jersey Redistricting Commission that took effect in January 2013, based on the results of the November 2012 general elections.

For the 119th United States Congress, New Jersey's 1st congressional district is represented by Donald Norcross (D, Camden). New Jersey is represented in the United States Senate by Democrats Cory Booker (Newark, term ends 2027) and Andy Kim (Moorestown, term ends 2031).

For the 2026–2027 session, the 6th legislative district of the New Jersey Legislature is represented in the State Senate by James Beach (D, Voorhees Township) and in the General Assembly by Louis Greenwald (D, Voorhees Township) and Melinda Kane (D, Cherry Hill).

Camden County is governed by a Board of County Commissioners composed of seven members chosen at-large in partisan elections for three-year terms on a staggered basis by the residents of the county, with either two or three seats up for election each year as part of the November general election. At a reorganization meeting held in January after each election, the newly constituted Board of Commissioners selects one member to serve as Director and another as Deputy Director, each serving a one-year term in that role. As of 2025, Camden County's Commissioners are: Commissioner Director Louis Cappelli Jr. (D, Collingswood, 2026), Commissioner Deputy Director Edward T. McDonnell (D, Pennsauken Township, 2025), Virginia Ruiz Betteridge (D, Runnemede, 2025), Almar Dyer (D, Pennsauken Township, 2027), Melinda Kane (D, Cherry Hill, 2027), Jeffrey L. Nash (D, Winslow Township, 2027), and Jonathan L. Young Sr. (D, Berlin Township, 2026).

Camden County's constitutional officers are: Clerk Pamela Rosen Lampitt (D, Cherry Hill, 2029) Sheriff Chuck Billingham (D, Gloucester City, 2027) and Surrogate Michelle Gentek-Mayer (D, Gloucester Township, 2025).

=== Politics ===
United States presidential election results for Cherry Hill
Year	Republican		Democratic		Third party(ies)	
Year	No.	%	No.	%	No.	%
2024	14,172	34.32%	26,453	64.06%	670	1.62%
2020	14,036	31.81%	29,541	66.95%	545	1.24%
2016	12,096	32.71%	23,685	64.04%	1,203	3.25%
2012	13,872	38.16%	22,128	60.87%	353	0.97%
2008	13,966	36.70%	23,765	62.45%	322	0.85%
2004	14,923	39.38%	22,734	59.99%	242	0.64%

As of March 2011, there were a total of 50,178 registered voters in Cherry Hill Township, of which 20,220 (40.3% vs. 31.7% countywide) were registered as Democrats, 8,374 (16.7% vs. 21.1%) were registered as Republicans and 21,553 (43.0% vs. 47.1%) were registered as Unaffiliated. There were 31 voters registered to other parties. Among the township's 2010 Census population, 70.6% (vs. 57.1% in Camden County) were registered to vote, including 91.7% of those ages 18 and over (vs. 73.7% countywide).

Gubernatorial election results for Cherry Hill
Year	Republican		Democratic		Third party(ies)	
Year	No.	%	No.	%	No.	%
2025	10,381	31.15%	22,773	68.34%	169	0.51%
2021	9,338	34.90%	17,220	64.37%	195	0.73%
2017	6,538	31.99%	13,526	66.17%	376	1.84%
2013	12,035	60.22%	7,683	38.45%	266	1.33%
2009	10,120	42.69%	12,046	50.82%	1,539	6.49%
2005	8,630	37.56%	13,615	59.26%	729	3.17%

In the 2016 presidential election, 36,984 votes were cast with a voter turnout of 70.05% (54,146 registered). Democrat Hillary Clinton received 64.0% of the vote (23,685 votes), beating Republican Donald Trump, who received 32.7% of the vote (12,096 votes). Other candidates received 3.25% of votes cast (1,203 votes). In the 2012 presidential election, Democrat Barack Obama received 60.9% of the vote (22,128 cast), ahead of Republican Mitt Romney with 38.2% (13,872 votes), and other candidates with 1.0% (353 votes), among the 36,572 ballots cast by the township's 53,628 registered voters (219 ballots were spoiled), for a turnout of 68.2%. In the 2008 presidential election, Democrat Barack Obama received 61.4% of the vote (23,765 cast), ahead of Republican John McCain, who received around 36.1% (13,966 votes), with 38,678 ballots cast among the township's 52,182 registered voters, for a turnout of 74.1%. In the 2004 presidential election, Democrat John Kerry received 59.9% of the vote (22,734 ballots cast), outpolling Republican George W. Bush, who received around 39.3% (14,923 votes), with 37,980 ballots cast among the township's 48,778 registered voters, for a turnout percentage of 77.9.

In the 2013 gubernatorial election, Republican Chris Christie received 60.2% of the vote (12,035 cast), ahead of Democrat Barbara Buono with 38.4% (7,683 votes), and other candidates with 1.3% (266 votes), among the 20,526 ballots cast by the township's 53,873 registered voters (542 ballots were spoiled), for a turnout of 38.1%. In the 2009 gubernatorial election, Democrat Jon Corzine received 50.8% of the vote (12,046 ballots cast), ahead of both Republican Chris Christie with 42.7% (10,120 votes) and Independent Chris Daggett with 4.5% (1,073 votes), with 23,705 ballots cast among the township's 50,250 registered voters, yielding a 47.2% turnout.

United States Senate election results for Cherry Hill1
Year	Republican		Democratic		Third party(ies)	
Year	No.	%	No.	%	No.	%
2024	12,910	31.97%	26,974	66.79%	501	1.24%
2018	10,990	35.28%	18,725	60.12%	1,433	4.60%
2012	12,383	35.62%	21,955	63.15%	430	1.24%
2006	9,272	38.89%	14,225	59.67%	342	1.43%

United States Senate election results for Cherry Hill2
Year	Republican		Democratic		Third party(ies)	
Year	No.	%	No.	%	No.	%
2020	14,500	33.30%	28,640	65.78%	400	0.92%
2014	6,930	37.21%	11,480	61.64%	215	1.15%
2013	4,780	36.45%	8,238	62.82%	95	0.72%
2008	13,542	37.89%	21,855	61.14%	346	0.97%

== Education ==
=== Public schools ===
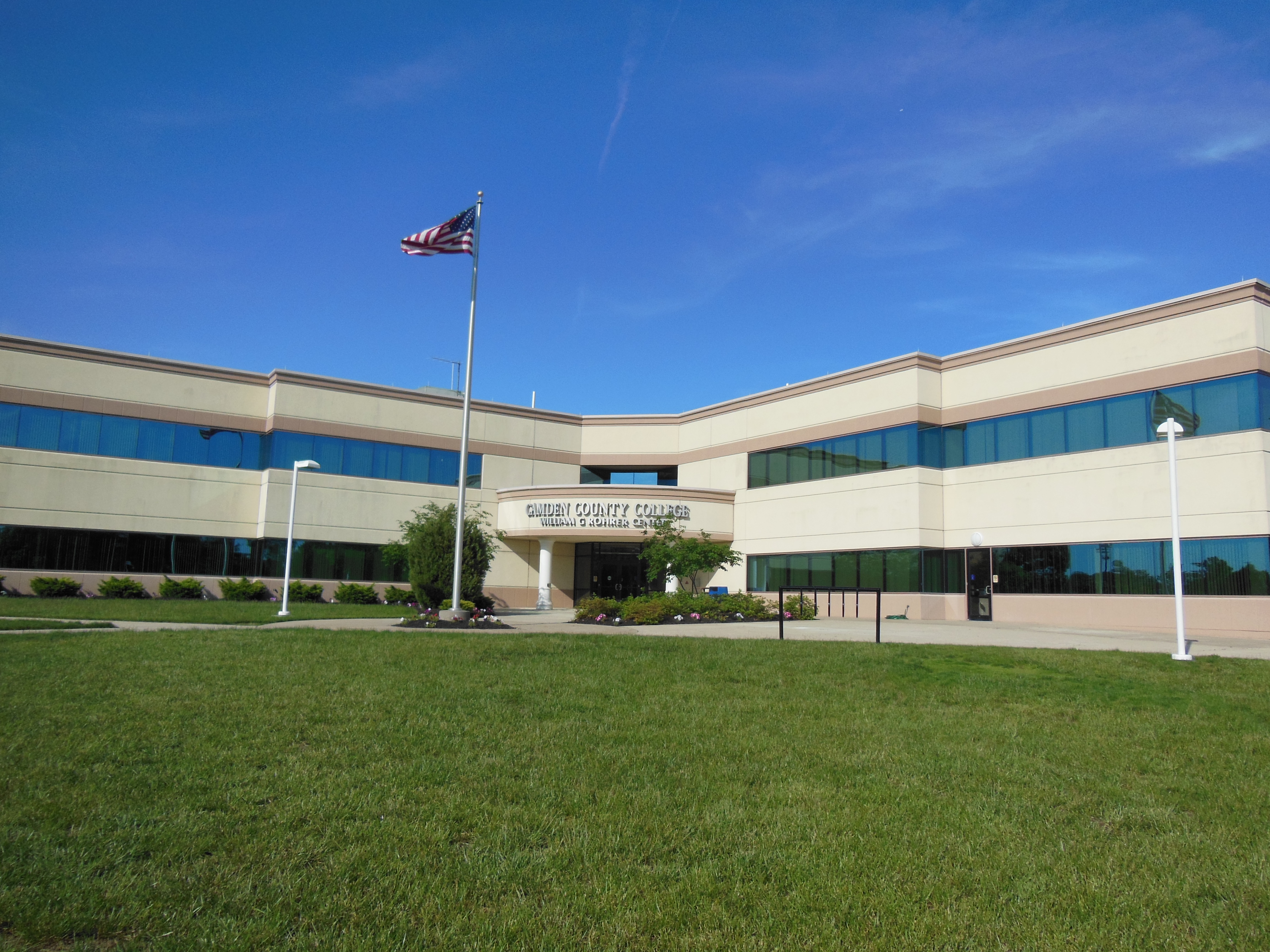
Rohrer Campus at Camden County College

Cherry Hill Public Schools is a public school district that serves students in pre-kindergarten through twelfth grade. The district operates 19 schools including an early childhood center, 12 elementary schools, three middle schools, two traditional high schools and an alternative high school. Cherry Hill was the state's 12th-largest school district in 2011 and was one of the largest suburban districts.

As of the 2023–24 school year, the district, comprised of 19 schools, had an enrollment of 10,772 students and 882.1 classroom teachers (on an FTE basis), for a student–teacher ratio of 12.2:1. Schools in the district (with 2023–24 enrollment data from the National Center for Education Statistics) are Estelle V. Malberg Early Childhood Center (with 201 students; in PreK), Clara Barton Elementary School (507; K–5), James F. Cooper Elementary School (266; K–5), Bret Harte Elementary School (359; K–5), James H. Johnson Elementary School (441; K–5), Joyce Kilmer Elementary School (405; K–5), Kingston Elementary School (406; K–5), A. Russell Knight Elementary School (431; K–5), Horace Mann Elementary School (271; K–5), Thomas Paine Elementary School (335; K–5), Joseph D. Sharp Elementary School (449; K–5), Richard Stockton Elementary School (360; K–5), Woodcrest Elementary School (358; K–5), Henry C. Beck Middle School (806; 6–8), John A. Carusi Middle School (884; 6–8), Rosa International Middle School (753; 6–8), Cherry Hill High School East (2,093; 9–12), Cherry Hill High School West (1,304; 9–12) and Coles High School Program (32; 9–12).

Cherry Hill's school district offered the International Baccalaureate certificate and diploma program at Cherry Hill West beginning in 2001, but phased it out at the conclusion of the 2007–2008 school year. The IB Primary Years Programme is offered at Joseph D. Sharp, James F. Cooper and Thomas Paine Elementary Schools. This program is also a part of the IB Middle Years Programme offered for grades 6–8 at Rosa International Middle School (RIMS).

=== Private schools ===
The Roman Catholic Diocese of Camden operates Resurrection Regional Catholic School, a Pre-K to 8 elementary school resulting of the merger of St. Peter Celestine School and Queen of Heaven School, as well as Camden Catholic High School for grades 9–12, which was established in 1887.

The King's Christian School is a private Christian fully accredited Pre-K–12 institution founded as the Christian Day School of Camden County in 1946.

Politz Day School of Cherry Hill is a private Modern Orthodox Jewish day school serving early childhood through middle school students, co-located with and supported by Congregation Sons of Israel.

=== Colleges and universities ===
Camden County College operates one of its three campuses at the William G. Rohrer Center at Route 70 East and Springdale Road.

== Transportation ==
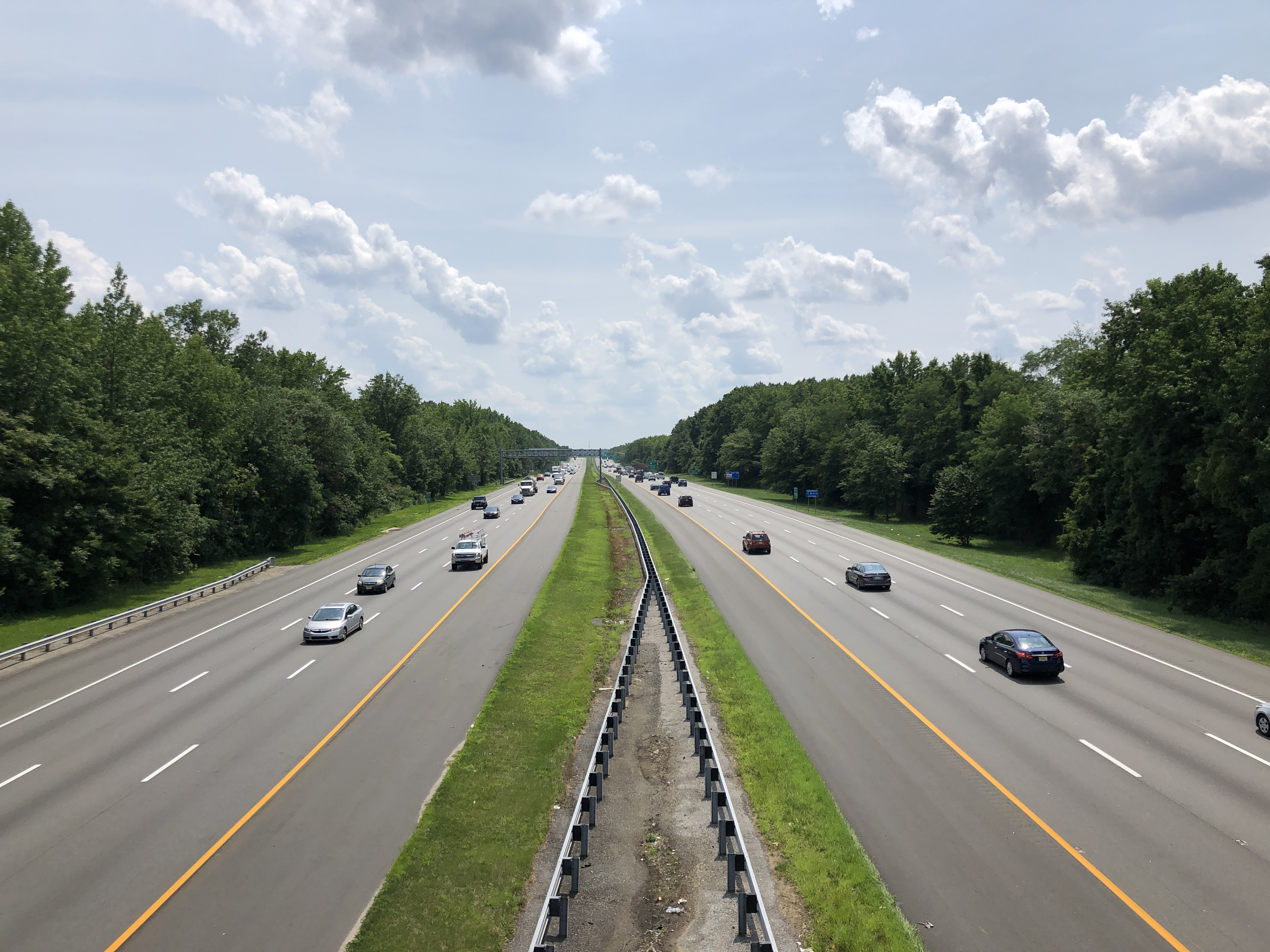
Interstate 295 in Cherry Hill

=== Roads and highways ===
As of May 2010, the township had a total of 309.36 miles (497.87 km) of roadways, of which 246.81 miles (397.20 km) were maintained by the municipality, 40.41 miles (65.03 km) by Camden County and 17.91 miles (28.82 km) by the New Jersey Department of Transportation and 4.23 miles (6.81 km) by the New Jersey Turnpike Authority.

The New Jersey Turnpike passes through Cherry Hill. The Walt Whitman rest area (southbound at milepost 30.2) is located in the township, but the closest interchange is exit 4 with Route 73 in neighboring Mount Laurel.

Interstate 295 has three exits in the township. Exit 34A/B is Route 70 (Marlton Pike); exit 32 is CR 561 (Haddonfield-Berlin Road); and exit 31 goes directly to the Woodcrest station of the PATCO high-speed commuter rail line. The other major highways in Cherry Hill include Route 38, Route 41, and Route 154.

=== Public transportation ===
NJ Transit bus service is available to and from Philadelphia on the 317, 404, and 406 routes, with local service on the 405, 450, 451, 455, and 457 routes. FlixBus, and, as of April 15, 2026, Greyhound Lines provide intercity bus service at the Cherry Hill Mall to and from around the region, including frequent express service to and from New York City.

NJ Transit's Atlantic City Line, traveling on the Pennsylvania-Reading Seashore Line route, stops at the Cherry Hill station, located on the west side of the tracks between the Garden State Pavilion shopping center and the newer development on the grounds of the former Garden State Racetrack.

The Woodcrest station of the PATCO Speedline is located in Cherry Hill, offering service between Lindenwold and 15–16th & Locust station in Philadelphia, Pennsylvania.

As of 2016, two Taiwan-based airlines, China Airlines and EVA Air, provides scheduled airport shuttle bus or van services to and from John F. Kennedy International Airport in New York City for customers based in New Jersey and the Philadelphia area. These shuttle services stop in Cherry Hill.

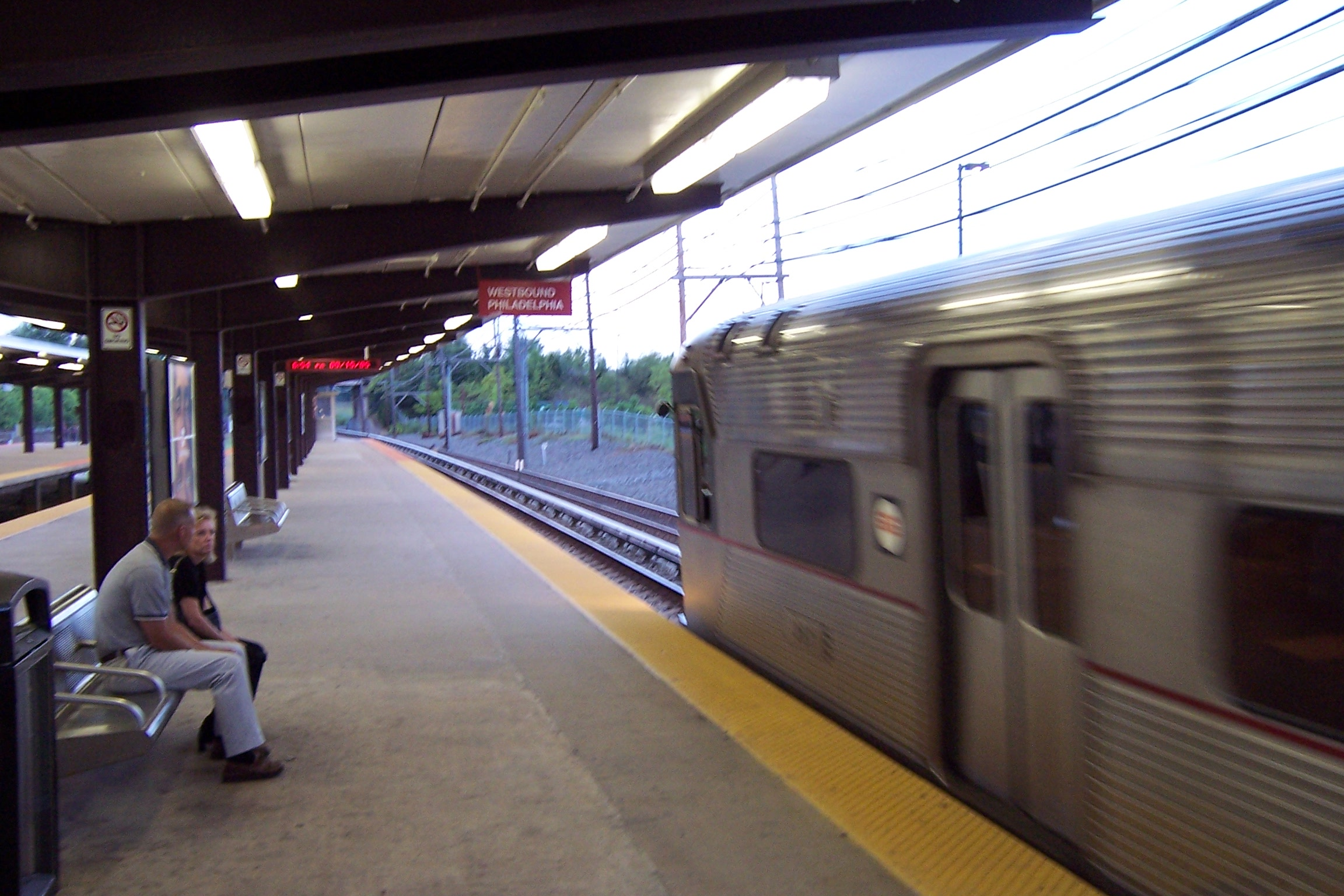
A PATCO Speedline train pulls into the Woodcrest station in Cherry Hill, heading westbound to Philadelphia

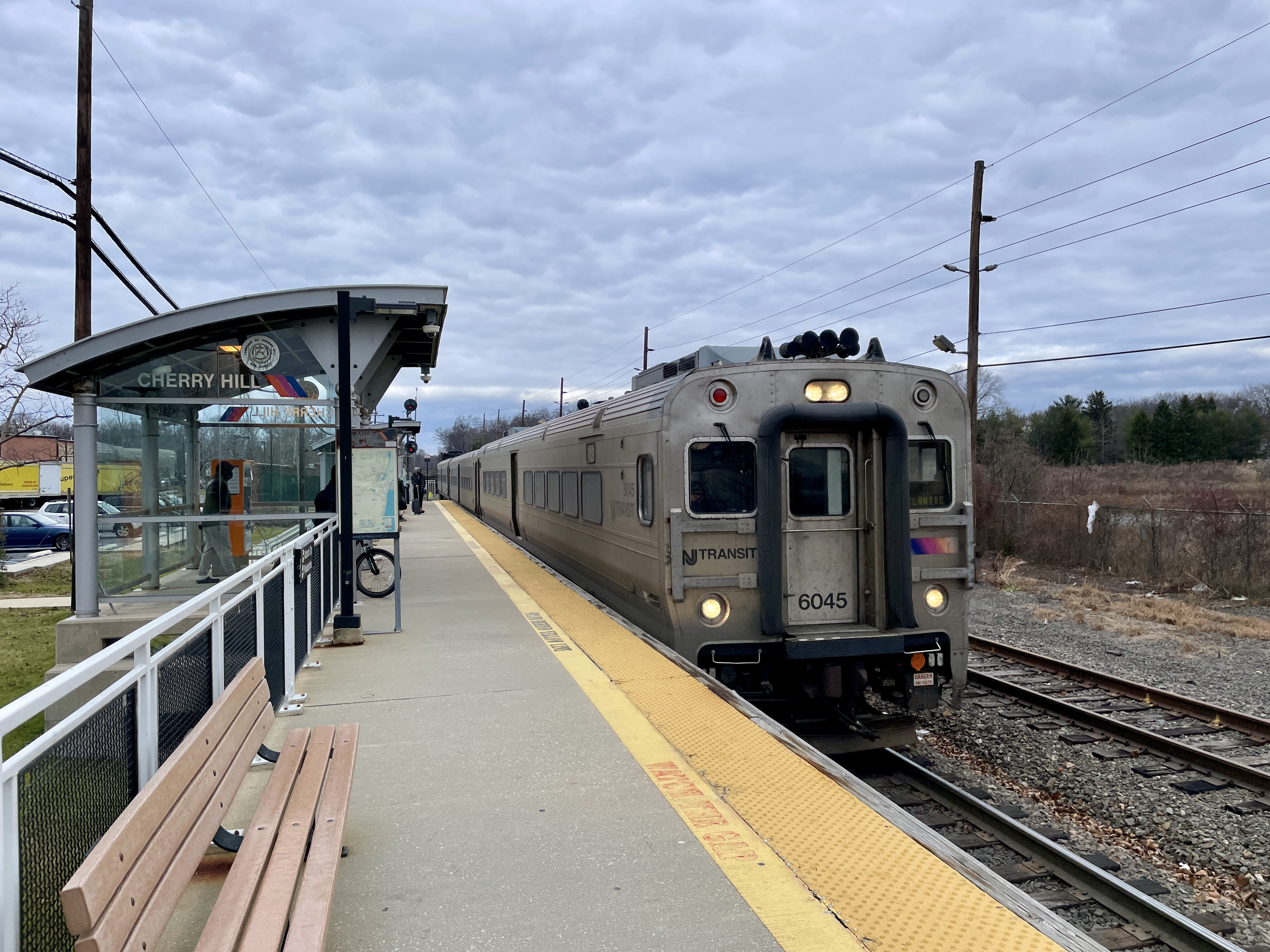
Cherry Hill station, along the NJ Transit route, connecting Philadelphia and Atlantic City

== Rankings ==
- In 2006, Cherry Hill was named among the "Best Places to Live" in the United States by Money magazine and was ranked eighth safest place to live in the same survey.
- Cherry Hill was also named among the "Best Places to Live" in the Philadelphia region for 2006 by Philadelphia magazine.

== See also ==
- Koreatown, Philadelphia
