= Epic Systems =

American healthcare software company

Epic Systems Corporation

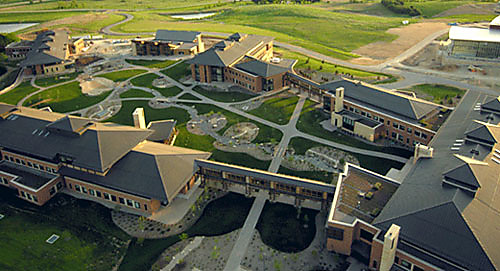
- Epic Systems HQ (Verona, WI)
- Type: Private
- Industry: Information technology Health informatics
- Founded: Madison, Wisconsin, U.S. (1979; 47 years ago)
- Founder: Judith Faulkner
- Headquarters: 1979 Milky Way; Verona, Wisconsin, U.S.
- Key people: Judith Faulkner, founder & CEO
- Revenue: $6.7 billion (2025)
- Number of employees: 14,000 (2025)
- Website: www.epic.com

Epic Systems Corporation is an American privately held healthcare software company based in Verona, Wisconsin. Founded in 1979, it develops large-scale software systems for electronic health records. It is the largest electronic health records vendor by market share. According to the company, more than 325 million patients have an electronic record in Epic.

== History ==
Epic was founded in 1979 by Judith Faulkner with a $70,000 investment (equivalent to $310,000 in 2025). While getting her master's degree, Faulkner took a course on computing in medicine under Dr. Warner Slack. She was tasked with developing a system to keep track of patient information. In 1979, shortly after receiving her master's degree, Faulkner co-founded Human Services Computing, with Dr. John Greist.

Originally headquartered in Madison, Wisconsin, Epic moved its headquarters to a large campus in the suburb of Verona, Wisconsin in 2005, where it employs 13,000 people as of 2023. Referred to by signage as "Epic Intergalactic Headquarters," the campus has themed areas/buildings, such as a castle-like structure, a shipwreck-themed building, a "Wizard Campus" that appears to be inspired by J.K. Rowling's Harry Potter, and a dining facility designed to mimic London King's Cross railway station.

As of 2024, the company was in the sixth phase of campus expansion with six new buildings each planned to contain as many as 400 offices. The company also has offices in Bristol, UK; 's-Hertogenbosch, Netherlands; Dubai, United Arab Emirates; Dhahran, Saudi Arabia; Helsinki, Finland; Melbourne, Australia; Singapore; Trondheim, Norway; and Søborg, Denmark. In January 2025, North Somerset Council approved Epic Systems’ plans to build a 90-acre European headquarters campus on green belt land near Long Ashton, west of Bristol.

From the late 2010s Epic expanded into the European market, selling their systems to countries with universal healthcare including the United Kingdom, Denmark, Finland and Norway. There has been significant controversy around the implementations of these systems.

Epic Systems intended to have employees return to work on-campus during the COVID-19 pandemic in 2020, but the plan was abandoned following criticism and as of December 2020, employees were still able to work from home. As of January 2022, Epic employees were required to work in the office almost daily and are given 10 "half-and-half days" (5 days, recorded in increments of 0.5) for remote work annually.

== Products and market ==
Epic primarily develops, manufactures, licenses, supports, and sells a proprietary electronic medical record software application, known in whole as 'Epic' or as Epic EMR. The company's healthcare software is centered on its Chronicles database management system. End users access Epic EMR through the client application Hyperspace. Epic's applications support functions related to healthcare, medical personnel, and insurance. Epic also develops MyChart, used by patients to access doctors' records, schedule appointments, review and re-fill medications, message their care team, and for billing purposes. It is used by 150 million patients across the US.

Epic has several data resources and analytic tools. Cogito is the analytic environment consisting of the Epic data warehouse and analytic capabilities. The different levels of the database architecture are Chronicles, Clarity and Caboodle. Chronicles is Epic's real-time database; the data the user enters is immediately available in Chronicles. Clarity is a relational database and Caboodle is an enterprise data warehouse platform. These databases can be queried using a variety of tools within Cogito such as Reporting Workbench and SlicerDicer. In addition, Epic Systems hosts the Cosmos data warehouse, which contains de-identified data from multiple organizations, with a total of 296 million patients.

The majority of U.S. News & World Report's top-ranked hospitals and medical schools use Epic. Among many others, Epic provides electronic record systems for Cedars-Sinai Medical Center in Los Angeles, the Cleveland Clinic, Johns Hopkins Hospital, UC Davis Medical Center in Sacramento, Kaiser Permanente,, UnityPoint Health and all Mayo Clinic campuses. Mass General Brigham began adopting Epic in 2015 in a project initially reported to cost $1.2 billion, which critics decried and which is greater than the cost of its buildings. By 2018, the total expenses for the project were $1.6 billion, with payments for the software itself amounting to less than $100 million and the majority of the costs caused by lost patient revenues, tech support and other implementation work. In 2022, Emory Healthcare, Baptist Health and Memorial Hermann Health System switched to Epic from Oracle Health.

Epic also offers cloud hosting for customers that do not wish to maintain their own servers; and short-term optimization and implementation consultants through their wholly owned subsidiary Boost, Inc.

The company's competitors include Oracle Health, MEDITECH, Allscripts, Athenahealth, and units of IBM, McKesson, and Siemens.

== Criticisms and controversies ==
The company has been criticized for its implementation of national health record systems in the UK, Denmark, Finland and Norway. A Norwegian government report found that the system put patient lives at risk and was more expensive than foreseen.

=== Profit maximization and provider fatigue ===
Critics have suggested that Epic's market dominance has been driven by its software's ability to maximize profits for hospitals by facilitating upcoding, a form of healthcare fraud.

Providers using electronic health records allegedly spend two hours entering data for every hour they spend with patients, including time outside of working hours. Interviews with providers suggest they think much of the data is clinically irrelevant. Critics have also suggested that while Epic provides time-saving tools, these are attempts to solve problems also exacerbated by Epic. Providers allegedly are faced with time-consuming training, alert fatigue, and mistakes stemming from copying and pasting from previous notes, ultimately leading to burnout and early retirements while using Epic products.

David Blumenthal, the National Coordinator for Health Information Technology from 2009 to 2011, said "The customers [of EHRs] were the chief information officers and the chief executives of hospitals, not doctors. Their principal goal was to protect revenues. Systems like Epic were not designed to improve quality because there was no financial incentive to do so at the time."

=== Data sharing practices ===
Care Everywhere is Epic's health information exchange software, which comes with its electronic health record (EHR, or EMR) system. The New York Times interviewed two doctors who said that their Epic systems would not allow them to share data with users of competitors' software in a way that would satisfy the Meaningful Use requirements of the HITECH Act. Epic customers must pay for one-time costs of linking Epic to each individual non-Epic system with which they wish to exchange data; in contrast, Epic's competitors have formed the CommonWell Health Alliance which set a common Interoperability Software standard for electronic health records. In September 2017, Epic announced Share Everywhere, which allows patients to authorize any provider who has internet access to view their record in Epic and to send progress notes back. Share Everywhere was named Healthcare Dive's "Health IT Development of the Year" in 2017. Barriers remain to data sharing, including Epic customization, which fields are available for export, and difficulty in sharing data outside of Epic.

=== Monopoly and anti-competitive practices ===
In September 2024, Particle Health, a health care startup, filed a suit accusing Epic of acting as a monopoly and engaging in antitrust violations stemming from Epic's position in sharing health data with third parties. Prior to this lawsuit, critics had questioned whether Epic operates as a monopoly. Epic filed a motion to dismiss the lawsuit against the company on December 20, 2024. The filing asserted that Particle Health "invented claims" and participated in conjecture. Particle outlined their claims in further detail in January 2025. Epic had restricted certain Particle customers from accessing health records in March 2024, allegedly without stating a reason. Particle's 2025 document alleged that Epic used this approach to pressure Particle customers to discontinue their partnerships with Particle and move business solely to Epic. In September 2025, a federal judge allowed the lawsuit to move forward.

A second suit was filed against Epic Systems in May 2025 by another health care software company, CureIS Healthcare. Similar to the allegations made by Particle Health, CureIS Healthcare submitted a civil complaint stating that Epic engaged in a "multi-prong scheme to destroy" competition. The complaint alleged that Epic did so by implementing a policy that asserted all medical facilities that use Epic's electronic health records software must also use the company's other in-house software, if available, instead of another company's. Also similar to Particle Health, CureIS explained in the complaint that Epic allegedly also "coerced" to end partnerships with CureIS, and that Epic engaged in "trade secret misappropriation" and "false advertising" against the smaller company.

In December 2025, Texas Attorney General Ken Paxton filed a lawsuit against Epic, accusing the company of stifling competition and using its market power to maintain an illegal monopoly.

=== Implementation difficulties ===
==== Denmark ====
In 2016, Danish health authorities spent 2.8 billion DKK on the implementation of Epic in 18 hospitals in a region with 2.8 million residents. On May 20, Epic went live in the first hospital. Doctors and nurses reported chaos in the hospital and complained of a lack of preparation and training.

Since some elements of the Epic system were not properly translated from English to Danish, physicians resorted to Google Translate. As of 2019, Epic had still not been fully integrated with Denmark's national medical record system. Danish anesthesiologist and computer architect Gert Galster worked to adapt the system. According to Galster, the Epic systems were designed specifically to fit the U.S. health care system, and could not be disentangled for use in Denmark.

An audit of the implementation was published in June 2018. At the end of 2018, 62% of physicians stated they were not satisfied with the system and 71 physicians signed a petition calling for its removal.

==== Finland ====
In 2012, the Hospital District of Helsinki and Uusimaa (HUS) decided to replace several smaller health record systems with one district-wide system created by Epic. It was called Apotti and would be used by health care and social services for the 2.2 million residents in the HUS area. The Apotti system was selected as the provider in 2015 and implementation started in 2018. By November 2022, the Apotti system had cost 625 million euros.

After the implementation, complaints from health care workers, especially from doctors, started accumulating. The system was accused of being too complicated and that its convoluted user interface was endangering patient safety. For example, one patient was administered the wrong chemotherapeutic drug because of an unclear selection menu in the system.

In July 2022, a complaint signed by 619 doctors who were users of Apotti was sent to Valvira. It demanded that the issues in the system be fixed or the system be removed entirely.

==== Norway ====
Central Norway introduced Epic (branded "Helseplattformen") in November 2022. After approximately two months, the public broadcaster NRK reported that around 25% of the doctors at the region's main hospital considered quitting their job, and that 40% were experiencing stress related health issues because of the new IT system. Previously, health personnel had demonstrated against the software by marching through the city of Trondheim. Because of the confusion ensuing from its introduction, including 16,000 letters not being sent to patients, the Norwegian CEO of the Helseplattformen IT project, Torbjørg Vanvik, had her employment ended by the board. Unexpected cost increases forced the authorities to decrease efforts in other areas, such as a planned initiative on mental health. A year after implementation over 90% of doctors in the affected hospitals considered the Epic system a threat to patient health, and hospital staff organized large protests at seven hospitals that had or were planning on implementing Epic systems.

As of 2025, critics argue the system has contributed to staff cuts, was risking patient safety, and was "world-renowned for not working".

==== Switzerland ====
Luzerner Kantonsspital (today LUKS Gruppe) was the first hospital in Switzerland to introduce Epic in September 2019. One year later, the Covid-19 pandemic played a role is delaying the full implementation of EPIC software, but LUKS CIO, Stefan Hunziker, expressed optimism about pandemic-related usefulness. In March 2024 Inselspital (Insel Gruppe) in Berne followed. While the platform has largely been well-received, some debate remains over digital identities.

==== United Kingdom ====
An Epic electronic health record system costing £200 million was installed at Cambridge University Hospitals NHS Foundation Trust in October 2014, the first installation of an Epic system in the UK.

After 2.1 million records were transferred to the system, it developed serious problems and the system became unstable. Ambulances were diverted to other hospitals for five hours and hospital consultants noted issues with blood transfusion and pathology services. Other problems included delays to emergency care and appointments, and problems with discharge letters, clinical letters and pathology test results. Chief information officer, Afzal Chaudhry, said "well over 90% of implementation proceeded successfully".

In July 2015, the BBC reported that the hospital's finances were being investigated. In September 2015, both the CEO and CFO of the hospital resigned. Problems with the clinical-records system, which were said to have compromised the "ability to report, highlight and take action on data" and to prescribe medication properly, were held to be contributory factors in the organization's sudden failure. In February 2016, digitalhealth.net reported that Clare Marx, president of the Royal College of Surgeons of England and member of the NHS National Information Board, found that at the time of implementation, "staff, patients and management rapidly and catastrophically lost confidence in the system. That took months and a huge amount of effort to rebuild."

== See also ==
- Blue Button
- Epic Systems Corp. v. Lewis
