= Ilise Feitshans =

American global health lawyer and expert in nanotechnology law

Ilise Feitshans is an American global health lawyer working in the field of nanotechnology.

== Education ==
Feitshans attended Barnard College for her undergraduate degree. She received her JD from Georgetown University in 1983. She went on to earn her Master's of Science from Johns Hopkins University School of Public Health, and her doctorate in International Relations from Geneva School of Diplomacy and International Relations. She holds the first Swiss doctorate in nanotechnology law.

As of November 2023, Feitshans was a Master of Law Candidate in National and Global Health at Georgetown University.

== Career ==
Until 2008, Feitshans worked as a civil servant at the Geneva branch of the United Nations. There, she contributed to an update of the UN's Encyclopedia of Occupational Health and Safety. She also previously worked in Archamps, France, while she served as a Fellow in Law of Nanotechnology at the European Scientific Institute.

In the United States, Feitshans worked as a faculty member at Columbia University School of Law.

As of 2023, she is a member of the U.S. Supreme Court bar.

== Publications ==
=== Books and chapters ===
- Feitshans, Ilise Levy (1997). Bringing Health to Work. Emalyn Press. ISBN 978-0-9662216-0-2.
- Feitshans, Ilise L. (May 24, 2018). Global Health Impacts of Nanotechnology Law: A Tool for Stakeholder Engagement. CRC Press. ISBN 978-1-351-13445-3.
- Feitshans, Ilise (September 7, 2021). "12. Nanoethics for safe work: philosophical foundations of safer nanodesign protecting workplace health". In Jeswani, Gunjan; Van De Voorde, Marcel (eds.). Handbook of Nanoethics. De Gruyter. doi:10.1515/9783110669282. ISBN 978-3-11-066928-2.
- Feitshans, Ilise (2021). "12. Emerging nanoregulations: zapping the mythical absence of nanotechnology law". In Van de Voorde, Marcel; Jeswani, Gunjan (eds.). Ethics in Nanotechnology. De Gruyter. doi:10.1515/9783110719932. ISBN 978-3-11-071993-2.
- Feitshans, Ilise L. (2021). "An Analysis of the Impacts of National Regulation on Occupational Safety and Health: How Regulations Protect Workers and Their Employers". Improving Global Worker Health and Safety Through Collaborative Capacity Building Initiatives. CRC Press. doi:10.1201/9781003026471-10. ISBN 978-1-003-02647-1.

=== Selected articles ===
- Feitshans, Ilise Levy; Garcia, Loretta Jean; Herr, Julie Kitser; Heindle, Richard (1984). "DBS under FCC and International Regulation". Vanderbilt Law Review. 37: 67.
- Feitshans, Ilise L. (1985). "Hazardous Substances in the Workplace: How Much Does the Employee Have the Right to Know". Detroit College of Law Review. 1985: 697.
- Feitshans, I L (July 1989). "Law and regulation of benzene". Environmental Health Perspectives. 82: 299–307. Bibcode:1989EnvHP..82..299F. doi:10.1289/ehp.8982299. ISSN 0091-6765. PMC 1568132. PMID 2792048.
- Feitshans, Ilise L. (1989). "Confronting AIDS in the Workplace: Balancing Employment Opportunity and Occupational Health under Existing Labor Laws". Detroit College of Law Review. 1989: 953.
- Feitshans, Ilise L. (October 1990). "Potential Liability of Industrial Hygienists Under USA Law: Part I: The Dawning of the Age of Industrial Hygienist Malpractice?". Applied Occupational and Environmental Hygiene. 5 (10): 683–692. doi:10.1080/1047322X.1990.10387771. ISSN 1047-322X.
- Feitshans, Ilise L. (March 1991). "Potential Liability of Industrial Hygienists Under USA Law Part II: Prescription for Reducing Potential Liability". Applied Occupational and Environmental Hygiene. 6 (3): 205–214. doi:10.1080/1047322X.1991.10387863. ISSN 1047-322X.
- Feitshans, Ilise (January 1, 1994). "Forshadowing Future Changes: Implications of the AIDS Pandemic for International Law and Policy of Public Health". Michigan Journal of International Law. 15 (3): 807–822. ISSN 1052-2867.
- Feitshans, Ilise L. (November 1994). "Job Security for Pregnant Employees: The Model Employment Termination Act". The Annals of the American Academy of Political and Social Science. 536 (1): 119–134. doi:10.1177/0002716294536001010. ISSN 0002-7162.
- Feitshans, Ilise L. (1995). "Legislating to Preserve Women's Autonomy during Pregnancy". Medicine and Law. 14 (5–6): 397–412. PMID 8868499.
- Feitshans, Ilise L. (1995). "Positive Incentives for Compliance: Balancing New Tools and Their Limits". Preventive Law Reporter. 14: 10.
- Feitshans, Ilise L. (1998–1999). "Is There a Human Right to Reproductive Health". Texas Journal of Women and the Law. 8: 93.
- Feitshans, Ilise L. (2001–2002). "Spider Silk Jeans or Spider Silk Genes - The Future of Genetic Testing in the Workplace - Presentation for Yale Medical School Occupational and Environmental Health October 24, 2000". New York Law School Journal of Human Rights. 18: 13.
- Feitshans, Ilise L (October 1, 2002). "Protecting posterity: the occupational physician's ethical and legal obligations to pregnant workers". Occupational Medicine (Philadelphia, Pa.). 17 (4): 673–685. ISSN 0885-114X. PMID 12225936.
- Feitshans, Ilise L. (March 12, 2012). "Forecasting Nano Law: Defining Nano". Nanotechnology Perceptions. 8 (1): 17–34. doi:10.4024/N15FE11A.ntp.08.01. ISSN 1660-6795.
- Lynch, Iseult; Feitshans, Ilise L.; Kendall, Michaela (February 5, 2015). "'Bio-nano interactions: new tools, insights and impacts': summary of the Royal Society discussion meeting". Philosophical Transactions of the Royal Society B: Biological Sciences. 370 (1661) 20140162. doi:10.1098/rstb.2014.0162. ISSN 0962-8436. PMC 4275916. PMID 25533104.
- Feitshans, Ilise L. (2022-12-11). "Global Health Technologies Transforming Intellectual Property Law and World Trade". Precision Nanomedicine. 5 (4): 977–993. doi:10.33218/001c.57587.
- Feitshans, Ilise (2023). "Freedom from choice: the U.S. Supreme Court decision in Dobbs v. Jackson". Cadernos Ibero-Americanos de Direito Sanitário. doi:10.17566/ciads.v12i1.998. ISSN 2358-1824.
- Feitshans, Ilise (March 27, 2024). "Deconstructing women's double burden that returned to work during the COVID-19 pandemic". Cadernos Ibero-Americanos de Direito Sanitário. 12 (4): 175–179. doi:10.17566/ciads.v12i4.1219. ISSN 2358-1824.

== Recognition ==
The American Society of Safety Engineers listed her among its "100 Women Making a Difference in Safety, Health and Environment Professions" in 2011. Ms. JD, a development and networking for women lawyers and law students, gave her its 2016 Superwomen award. Her PhD thesis in international relations was awarded the Lausanne Prix de la Fondation de médecine sociale et preventive prize for the best research in social medicine and prevention at the University of Lausanne in 2014.

== Personal life ==
Feitshans splits her time between Haddonfield, New Jersey and France, where her husband, Dominique, works. She has two children.
