= Marvin Roffman =

Former Financial Analyst

Marvin B. Roffman (born 1940) is an American author and former financial analyst known for his insights into the gambling industry since 1978, particularly in Atlantic City, New Jersey. He used to live in Haddonfield, New Jersey in 1990, but currently resides in Rehoboth Beach, Delaware.

== Career ==
Roffman worked at Janney Montgomery Scott for 17 years, where he served as Vice President of research before his employment was dismissed. In 1990, he founded Roffman Miller Associates, Inc. (RMA) with Peter Miller, an investment advisor located in Philadelphia, Pennsylvania, from which he retired in 2007. In 1987, Donald Trump hired Roffman as an expert witness.

== Trump Taj Mahal financial prediction ==
Before the opening of the Trump Taj Mahal in May 1988, Roffman suggested that the casino would be unable to generate adequate profits to cover its debts. He conveyed his prediction in various newspaper outlets such as The Wall Street Journal, Associated Press, and The Boston Globe. He stated that while the Taj would experience a noteworthy initial influx of customers, it would encounter difficulties in sustaining its operations beyond October.

This prediction caught the attention of Donald Trump, who in response faxed a letter to Norman T. Wilde Jr., the chairman of Janney Montgomery Scott. Trump demanded either Roffman's immediate dismissal or a public apology in the form of a letter. He warned of a potential major lawsuit against the insurance company otherwise. As a result, the firm chose to terminate Roffman's employment on March 23.

However, after the stock market crash on October 13, 1989, Roffman's evaluation proved accurate, leading to the eventual bankruptcy of the Trump Taj Mahal in 1990.

In July 1990 he instituted a wrongful-dismissal lawsuit against Trump, a legal matter in which he won through a court settlement.

== Media career ==
=== Books ===
Roffman wrote and published the book "Take Charge of Your Financial Future: Straight Talk on Managing Your Money from the Financial Analyst Who Defied Donald Trump" (1994) with Michael J. Schwager.

=== Movies ===
Roffman played himself in the documentary film Trump: An American Dream.
