= Hadrosaurus Foulkii Leidy Site =

- Hadrosaurus foulkii Leidy Site
- U.S. National Register of Historic Places
- U.S. National Historic Landmark
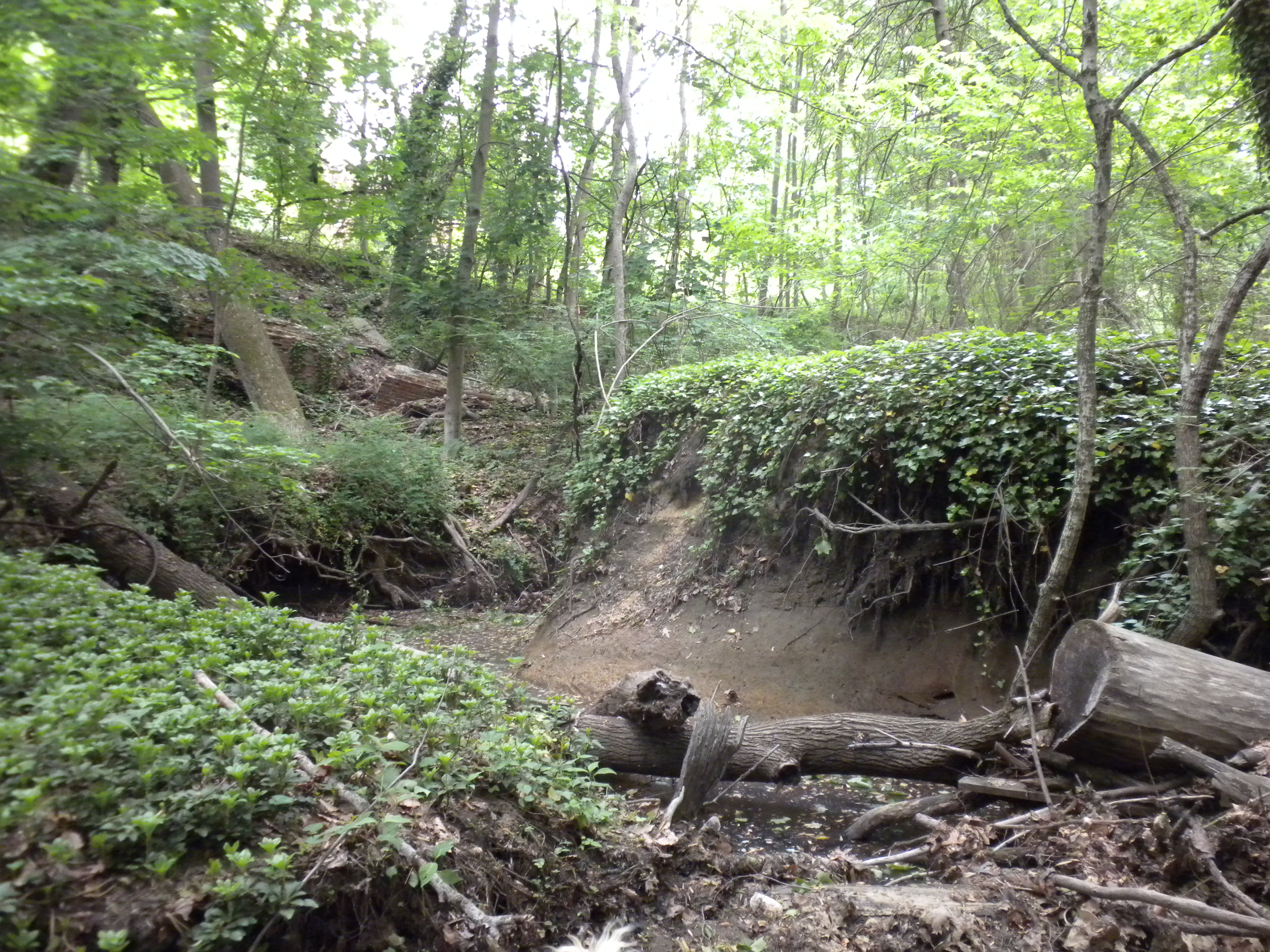
- Marl pit at the site, in which the bones were found

- Location within Camden County, New Jersey Location within New Jersey Location within the United States
- Location: Haddonfield, New Jersey, USA
- Coordinates: 39.91018°N 75.02856°W
- Area: 4 acres (1.6 ha)
- Built: 1858
- NRHP reference No.: 94001648

Significant dates
- Added to NRHP: October 12, 1994
- Designated NHL: October 12, 1994

The Hadrosaurus foulkii Leidy Site is a historic paleontological site in Haddonfield, Camden County, New Jersey. Now set in state-owned parkland, it is where the first relatively complete set of dinosaur bones were discovered in 1838, and then fully excavated by William Parker Foulke in 1858. The dinosaur was later named Hadrosaurus foulkii by Joseph Leidy. The site, designated a National Historic Landmark in 1994, is now a small park known as "Hadrosaurus Park" and is accessed at the eastern end of Maple Avenue in northern Haddonfield.

== History ==
William Parker Foulke, an attorney and amateur paleontologist affiliated with Philadelphia's Academy of Natural Sciences, was vacationing in Haddonfield in 1858, when he was alerted to the discovery in 1838 of large bones on the farm of Joseph Hopkins. Hopkins and farm workers had been quarrying marl when they uncovered bones resembling vertebrae. Foulke proceeded to direct a careful excavation in the area surrounding Hopkins' marl pit, turning the finds over to Dr. Joseph Leidy for analysis. Foulke unearthed 35 of an estimated 80 bones from the Hadrosaurus, which is believed to have been herbivorous, 7 meters in length, and weigh 2.5 tons. It lived during the Cretaceous period, 73 million years ago. Leidy published an analysis in 1865, and oversaw the creation of a reconstructed skeleton of the creature found in 1868. This reconstruction, put on public display at the Academy, brought the find a wider public audience.

The site lingered in obscurity until 1984 when a local Boy Scout from Troop 65, Christopher Brees, as part of an Eagle Scout project researched the site and generated publicity, eventually leading to the species being designated the official dinosaur of New Jersey.

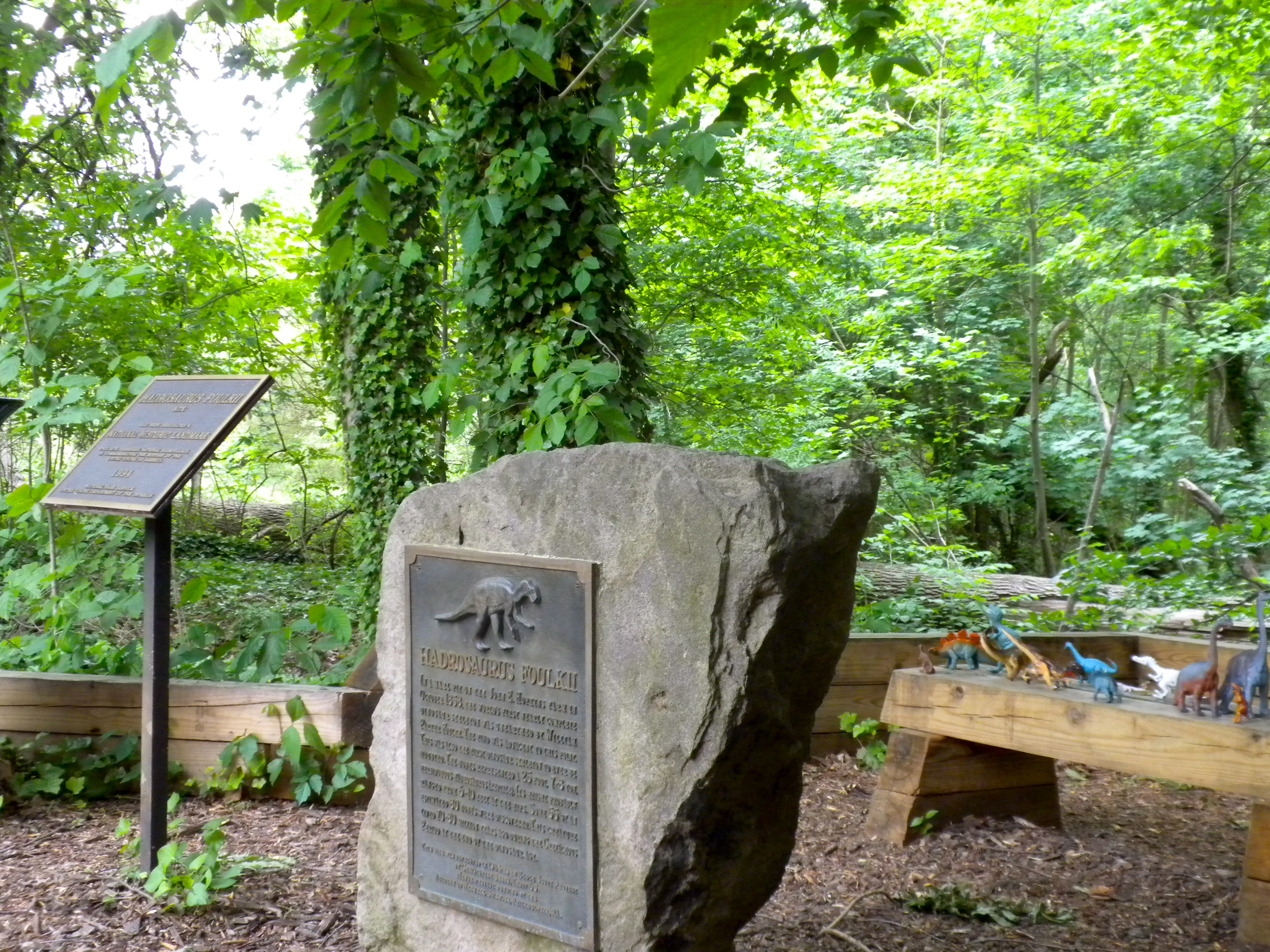
Plaques at the site showing National Historic Landmark status (left) and a plaque from Philadelphia's Academy of Natural Sciences. A deep pit or ravine is straight ahead about 10 yards.

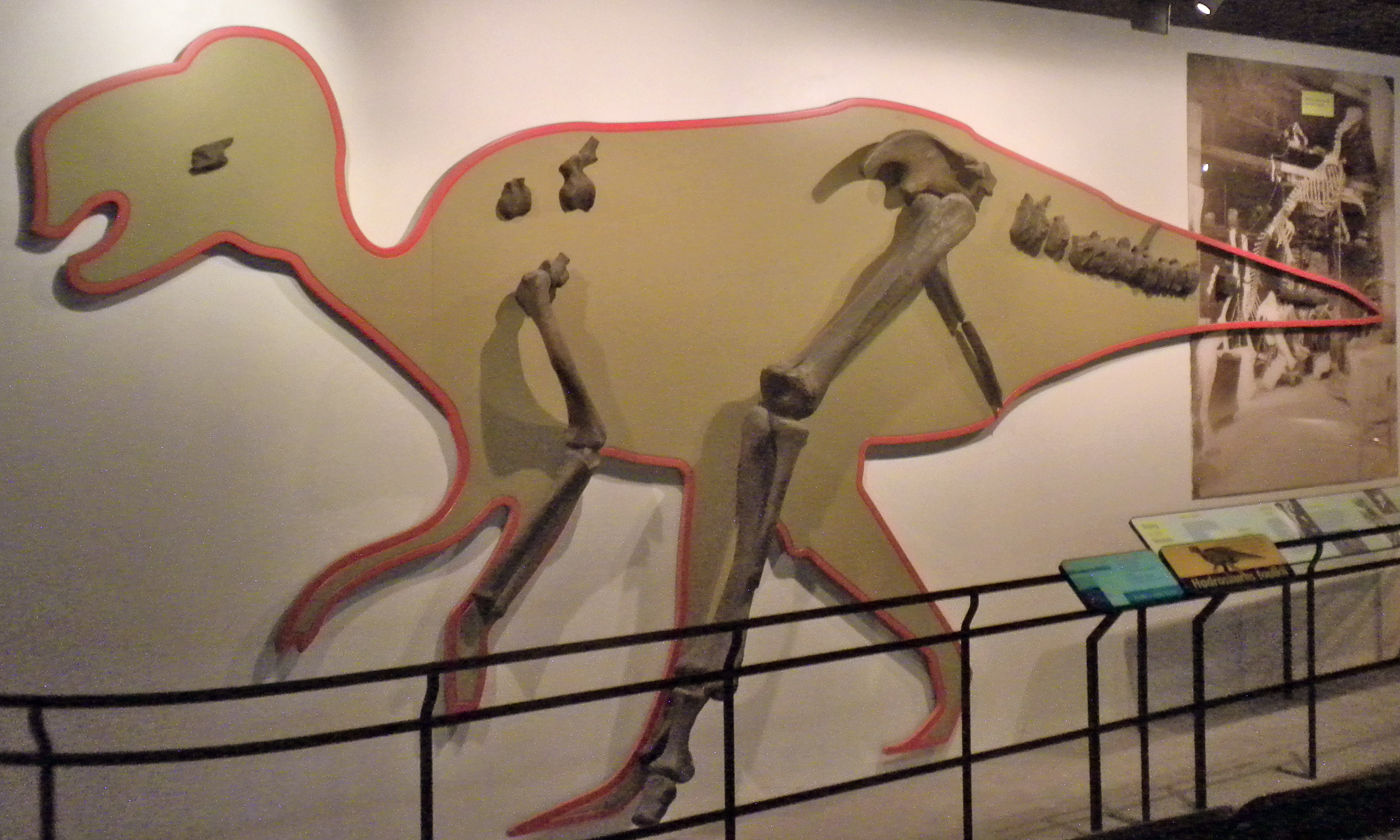
A display at the Academy of Natural Sciences of casts of the 35 bones dug up at the site

== See also ==
- List of National Historic Landmarks in New Jersey
- National Register of Historic Places listings in Camden County, New Jersey
