= Haddon Fortnightly Club House =

- U.S. National Register of Historic Places
- New Jersey Register of Historic Places
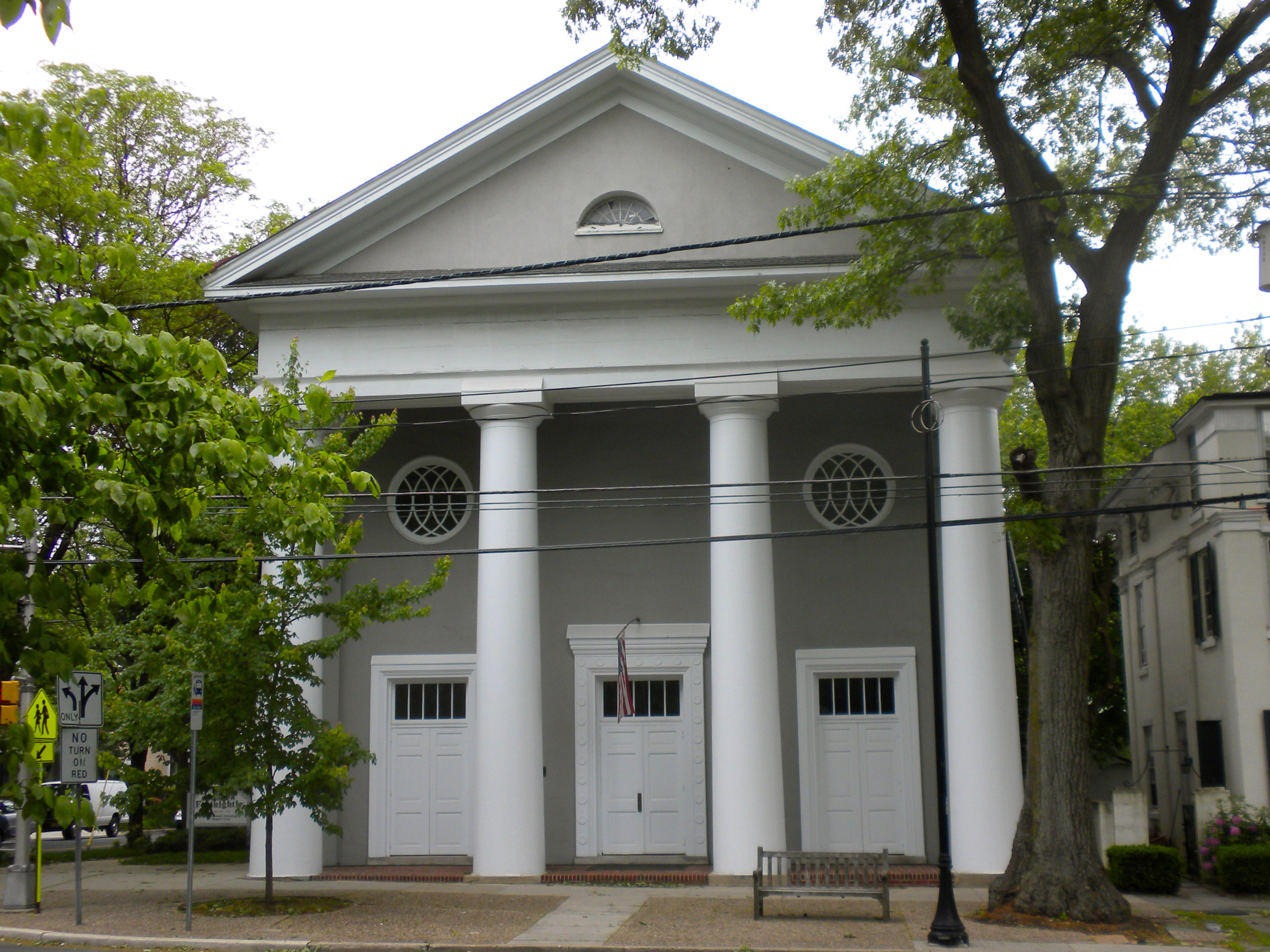

- Location within Camden County, New Jersey Location within New Jersey Location within the United States
- Location: 301 King's Highway, Haddonfield, New Jersey
- Coordinates: 39°53′59″N 75°1′45″W
- Area: 0.2 acres (0.081 ha)
- Built: 1857
- NRHP reference No.: 72000771
- NJRHP No.: 972

Significant dates
- Added to NRHP: October 26, 1972
- Designated NJRHP: March 17, 1972

Haddon Fortnightly Club House is located in Haddonfield, Camden County, New Jersey, United States. The building was built in 1857 and added to the National Register of Historic Places on October 26, 1972.

== See also ==
- National Register of Historic Places listings in Camden County, New Jersey
