= Trump: An American Dream =

British television documentary miniseries

- Genre: Documentary
- Narrated by: Colin Tierney
- Country of origin: United Kingdom
- Original language: English
- No. of seasons: 1
- No. of episodes: 4

Production
- Executive producers: David Glover; Mark Raphael
- Running time: 48–66 min.
- Production company: 72 Films

Original release
- Network: Channel 4
- Release: November 2017

Trump: An American Dream is a four-part British television documentary series, exploring the journey of Donald Trump through five decades, his public persona and career path leading up to his presidential run. Trump: An American Dream first was released for UK television on Channel 4 in November 2017, followed by a global release on Netflix in March 2018. The documentary features original footage and interviews with early employees of The Trump Organization, addresses the business and personal relationship Trump had with his first wife, Ivana Trump, and covers the alliances Trump had with Roger Stone and Roy Cohn.

== Cast ==
- Nikki Haskell
- Rona Barrett
- Wayne Barrett
- Ken Auletta
- David Cay Johnston
- Barbara Res
- Geraldo Rivera
- Marvin Roffman

== Episodes ==
=== Season 1 (2017) ===
No.	Title	Directed by	Original release date	Prod. code
1	"Manhattan"	Barnaby Peel	November 9, 2017	101
2	"The Gambler"	Barnaby Peel	November 16, 2017	102
3	"Citizen Trump"	Natasha Zinni & Barnaby Peel	November 23, 2017	103
4	"Politics"	Daniel Bogado & Barnaby Peel	November 30, 2017	104
