= Haddonfield, New Jersey =

Borough in Camden County, New Jersey, US

- Borough
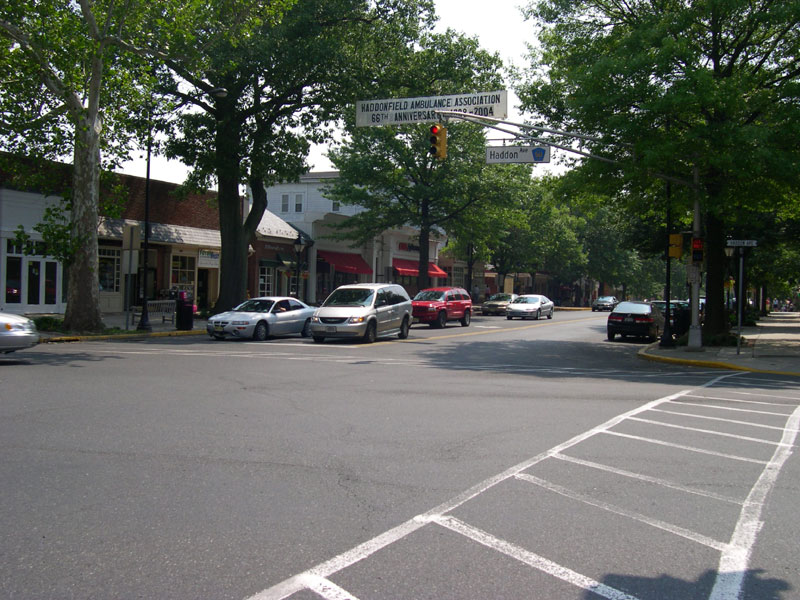
- Downtown Haddonfield in March 2005

- Seal

- Location of Haddonfield in Camden County highlighted in red (right). Inset map: Location of Camden County in New Jersey highlighted in orange (left).

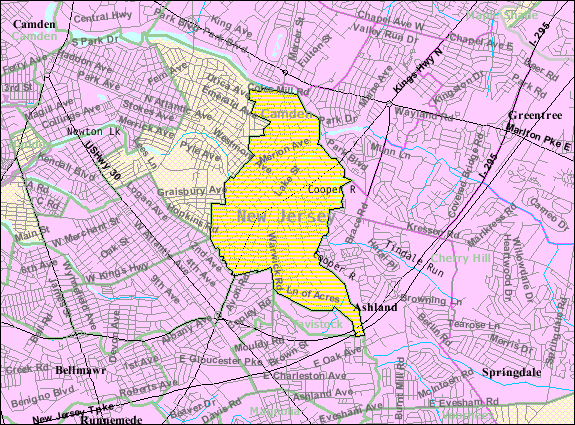
- Census Bureau map of Haddonfield, New Jersey

- Location in Camden County Location in New Jersey Location in the United States
- Coordinates: 39.895416°N 75.034413°W
- Country: United States
- State: New Jersey
- County: Camden
- Incorporated: April 6, 1875
- Named for: Elizabeth Haddon

Government
  - Type: Walsh Act
  - Body: Board of Commissioners
  - Mayor: Dave Siedell (term ends May 15, 2029)
  - Administrator: Sharon McCullough
  - Municipal clerk: Deanna Bennett

Area
  - Total: 2.84 sq mi (7.36 km^{2})
  - Land: 2.80 sq mi (7.24 km^{2})
  - Water: 0.046 sq mi (0.12 km^{2}) 1.58%
  - Rank: 350th of 565 in state 13th of 37 in county
- Elevation: 75 ft (23 m)

Population (2020)
  - Total: 12,550
  - Estimate (2023): 12,571
  - Rank: 204th of 565 in state 10th of 37 in county
  - Density: 4,488.6/sq mi (1,733.1/km^{2})
  - Rank: 133rd of 565 in state 13th of 37 in county
- Time zone: UTC−05:00 (Eastern (EST))
  - Summer (DST): UTC−04:00 (Eastern (EDT))
- ZIP Code: 08033
- Area code: 856
- FIPS code: 3400728770
- GNIS feature ID: 0885238
- Website: www.haddonfieldnj.org

Haddonfield is a borough located in Camden County, in the U.S. state of New Jersey. As of the 2020 United States census, the borough's population was 12,550, an increase of 957 (+8.3%) from the 2010 census count of 11,593, which in turn reflected a decline of 66 (−0.6%) from the 11,659 counted in the 2000 census.

Haddonfield was incorporated by an act of the New Jersey Legislature on April 6, 1875, within portions of Haddon Township following a referendum on the same day. The borough became an independent municipality in 1894. The borough was named for Elizabeth Haddon, an early settler of the area.

== History ==
The Lenape were indigenous to Haddonfield and the surrounding area, but this Native American tribe largely disappeared following European arrival. Arrowheads and pottery shards have been found by the banks of the Cooper River. The Lenape heritage of the borough is marked with a monument marking their connection to the area.

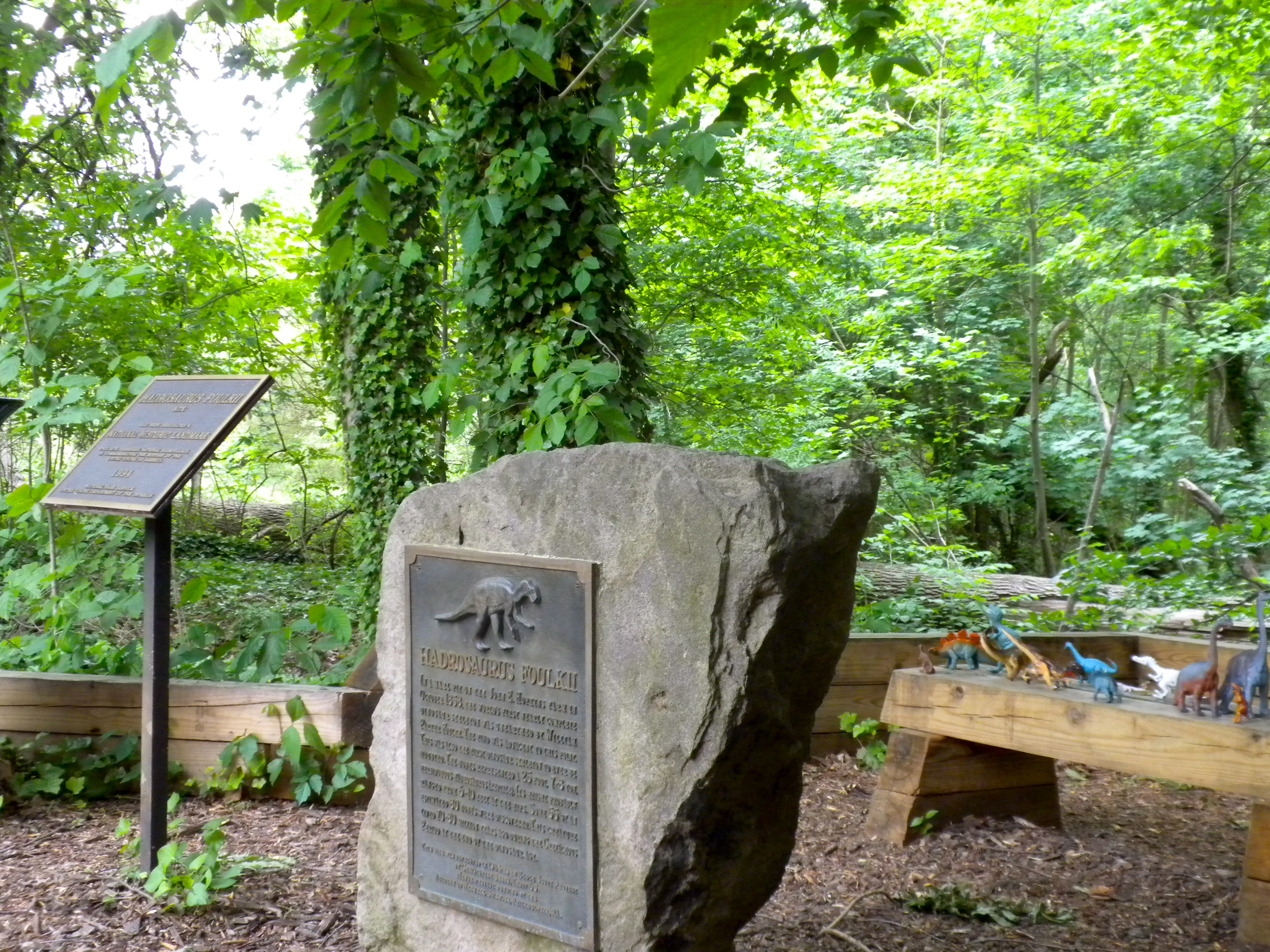
Plaques at the Hadrosaurus Foulkii Leidy Site showing National Historic Landmark status (left) and a plaque from Philadelphia's Academy of Natural Sciences. At right, toy dinosaurs have been left by visitors. A deep pit or ravine is straight ahead about 10 yards

On October 23, 1682, Francis Collins, an English Quaker and a bricklayer by trade, became the first settler within the boundaries of what today is Haddonfield. Collins soon built a house, "Mountwell," on a tract of 400 acres (160 ha). Haddonfield was further developed by Elizabeth Haddon (1680–1762), whose Quaker father, John Haddon, bought a 500 acres (2.0 km^{2}) tract of land in the English colony of West Jersey to escape religious persecution. Elizabeth set sail alone from Southwark, England to the New World in 1701. Shortly after her arrival, she made a marriage proposal to John Estaugh, a Quaker minister, and they were married in 1702. The town was named for John Haddon, though he never came to America.

The Indian King Tavern, built in 1750, played a significant role in the American Revolutionary War. During that war, the New Jersey Legislature met there, avoiding British forces, and in 1777, declared New Jersey to be an independent state. Today the tavern is a state historical site and museum. Nevertheless, since 1873, Haddonfield has been a dry town where alcohol cannot be sold though it can be brewed and distributed in town.

Haddonfield is a significant historic paleontology site. In 1838, William Estaugh Hopkins uncovered large bones in a marl pit in which he was digging. Hopkins displayed the bones at his home, Birdwood; and these bones sparked the interest of a visitor, William Foulke. In 1858, Foulke dug from the marl pit the first relatively complete skeleton of a dinosaur found in North America, Hadrosaurus foulkii. The skeleton was assembled in 1868 and is still displayed at Philadelphia Academy of Natural Sciences. A 17-foot (5.2 m) long bronze sculpture of “Haddy”, by sculptor John Giannotti, stands in the center of town. Hadrosaurus was recognized officially as the state dinosaur of New Jersey in June 1991.

In 1875, Haddonfield became the first community to secede from Haddon Township and become a self-governing borough. Haddonfield is noted for its historic homes, quaint shops, and legions of lawyers. As a legal center for southern New Jersey, the town houses the offices of more than 390 attorneys.

Haddonfield once was home to Symphony in C (formerly the Haddonfield Symphony), which is now based in nearby Collingswood, and performs at the Gordon Theater at Rutgers University-Camden.

Haddonfield is home to the second oldest volunteer fire company in continuous service in the United States. Haddon Fire Company No. 1 was established as Friendship Fire Company on March 8, 1764, by 26 townsmen. Each member was to furnish two leather buckets while the company supplied six ladders and three fire hooks.

In 1971, Haddonfield became the second municipality in New Jersey (after Cape May) to establish a historic preservation district. In keeping with the historic appearance of the borough, some candidates for commissioner distribute colored ribbons to their supporters instead of yard signs.

== Geography ==
According to the United States Census Bureau, the borough had a total area of 2.84 square miles (7.36 km^{2}), including 2.80 square miles (7.24 km^{2}) of land and 0.05 square miles (0.12 km^{2}) of water (1.58%).

The Cooper River forms the border between Haddonfield and Cherry Hill. Haddonfield shares land borders with Audubon, Barrington, Haddon Township, Haddon Heights, Lawnside, and Tavistock.

=== Bodies of water ===
- Hopkins Pond, covering 33 acres (13 ha), is contained by a large earthen dam, and Hopkins Lane is built atop it. The pond was created in 1789, when John Estaugh Hopkins built a dam on a tributary of the Cooper River to power a gristmill that operated until the 1850s. In recent years, local officials have raised concerns about the pond being contaminated with cyanobacteria that can produce toxic blue-green algae blooms.
- Driscoll Pond, contained by a small wooden dam, is below Hopkins Pond, and Hopkins Pond flows into it. Driscoll Pond is part of the Hopkins Pond park.
- Evans Pond is part of Wallworth Park and located above Wallworth Lake with a dam separating the two. Formerly Evans Pond was deep enough for small boats to sail on it.
- Wallworth Lake, in Wallworth Park, is below Evans Pond, and contained by another dam.

== Demographics ==
Historical population
Census	Pop.	Note	%±
1850	944		—
1870	1,075		—
1880	1,480		37.7%
1890	2,502		69.1%
1900	2,776		11.0%
1910	4,142		49.2%
1920	5,646		36.3%
1930	8,857		56.9%
1940	9,742		10.0%
1950	10,495		7.7%
1960	13,201		25.8%
1970	13,118		−0.6%
1980	12,337		−6.0%
1990	11,628		−5.7%
2000	11,669		0.4%
2010	11,593		−0.7%
2020	12,550		8.3%
2023 (est.)	12,571	▲	0.2%
Population sources: 1850–1960; 1880–2000 1880–1920; 1890–1910 1910–1930; 1940–2000; 2010 2020

=== 2020 census ===
As of the 2020 census, Haddonfield had a population of 12,550. The median age was 40.3 years. 28.9% of residents were under the age of 18 and 16.6% of residents were 65 years of age or older. For every 100 females there were 94.0 males, and for every 100 females age 18 and over there were 89.3 males age 18 and over.

100.0% of residents lived in urban areas, while 0.0% lived in rural areas.

There were 4,410 households in Haddonfield, of which 42.2% had children under the age of 18 living in them. Of all households, 65.0% were married-couple households, 9.9% were households with a male householder and no spouse or partner present, and 21.4% were households with a female householder and no spouse or partner present. About 20.6% of all households were made up of individuals and 11.7% had someone living alone who was 65 years of age or older.

There were 4,682 housing units, of which 5.8% were vacant. The homeowner vacancy rate was 1.6% and the rental vacancy rate was 7.9%.

Racial composition as of the 2020 census
Race	Number	Percent
White	11,109	88.5%
Black or African American	148	1.2%
American Indian and Alaska Native	14	0.1%
Asian	370	2.9%
Native Hawaiian and Other Pacific Islander	5	0.0%
Some other race	92	0.7%
Two or more races	812	6.5%
Hispanic or Latino (of any race)	458	3.6%

=== 2010 census ===
The 2010 United States census counted 11,593 people, 4,436 households, and 3,181 families in the borough. The population density was 4,104.9 per square mile (1,584.9/km^{2}). There were 4,634 housing units at an average density of 1,640.8 per square mile (633.5/km^{2}). The racial makeup was 95.23% (11,040) White, 1.11% (129) Black or African American, 0.03% (4) Native American, 1.85% (215) Asian, 0.00% (0) Pacific Islander, 0.43% (50) from other races, and 1.34% (155) from two or more races. Hispanic or Latino of any race were 2.14% (248) of the population.

Of the 4,436 households, 36.0% had children under the age of 18; 61.7% were married couples living together; 7.8% had a female householder with no husband present and 28.3% were non-families. Of all households, 24.9% were made up of individuals and 11.9% had someone living alone who was 65 years of age or older. The average household size was 2.61 and the average family size was 3.17.

27.7% of the population were under the age of 18, 5.3% from 18 to 24, 20.4% from 25 to 44, 31.6% from 45 to 64, and 15.0% who were 65 years of age or older. The median age was 42.9 years. For every 100 females, the population had 91.3 males. For every 100 females ages 18 and older there were 88.7 males.

The Census Bureau's 2006–2010 American Community Survey showed that (in 2010 inflation-adjusted dollars) median household income was $112,105 (with a margin of error of +/− $10,416) and the median family income was $129,100 (+/− $16,987). Males had a median income of $92,409 (+/− $10,521) versus $61,272 (+/− $6,669) for females. The per capita income for the borough was $55,955 (+/− $5,275). About 3.8% of families and 4.9% of the population were below the poverty line, including 4.5% of those under age 18 and 7.2% of those age 65 or over.

=== 2000 census ===
As of the 2000 United States census there were 11,659 people, 4,496 households, and 3,255 families residing in the borough. The population density was 4,124.7 inhabitants per square mile (1,592.6/km^{2}). There were 4,620 housing units at an average density of 1,634.5 per square mile (631.1/km^{2}). The racial makeup of the borough was 96.47% White, 1.27% African American, 0.13% Native American, 1.12% Asian, 0.03% Pacific Islander, 0.32% from other races, and 0.67% from two or more races. 1.46% of the population were Hispanic or Latino of any race.

There were 4,496 households, out of which 35.0% had children under the age of 18 living with them, 62.9% were married couples living together, 7.1% had a female householder with no husband present, and 27.6% were non-families. 24.1% of all households were made up of individuals, and 11.0% had someone living alone who was 65 years of age or older. The average household size was 2.57 and the average family size was 3.09.

In the borough the population was spread out, with 27.2% under the age of 18, 3.7% from 18 to 24, 25.4% from 25 to 44, 27.9% from 45 to 64, and 15.9% who were 65 years of age or older. The median age was 41 years. For every 100 females, there were 90.4 males. For every 100 females age 18 and over, there were 85.1 males.

The median income for a household in the borough was $86,872, and the median income for a family was $103,597. Males had a median income of $73,646 versus $44,968 for females. The per capita income for the borough was $43,170. 2.2% of the population and 1.3% of families were below the poverty line. Out of the total population, 2.0% of those under the age of 18 and 3.2% of those 65 and older were living below the poverty line.

== Notable locations ==
The Indian King Tavern was a colonial American tavern where, in 1777, the New Jersey General Assembly held a meeting at which they officially declared New Jersey to be an independent state. It has since been declared a State Historic Site, restored to its original layout, and turned into a museum with guided tours available to the public.

On the "Main Street" of Haddonfield, Kings Highway, there is a statue of a Hadrosaurus, a type of dinosaur discovered in Haddonfield. The statue, unveiled in October 2003, has been described as "the central landmark of downtown Haddonfield." The statue serves as a mascot of sorts for Haddonfield.

== Parks and recreation ==
Haddonfield has several parks maintained by the Camden County Parks Department:

- Hopkins Pond covers 33.10 acres (13.40 ha) and contains both Hopkins Pond and Driscoll Pond.
- Pennypacker Park contains the Hadrosaurus Foulkii Leidy Site and is near the Cooper River.
- Wallworth Park contains Evans Pond and Wallworth Pond. Evans Pond is dammed and flows into Wallworth Pond, which is also dammed. Each of these ponds is actually a section of the Cooper River, and the early headwaters of the Cooper flow into Evans Pond.

It also has several parks maintained by other groups:

- The Crows Woods Complex contains community gardens, fields for public use, and a hiking loop.
- Mountwell Park contains a small playground and a baseball field along with wooded areas.

== Government ==
=== Local government ===
The Borough of Haddonfield has been governed under the Walsh Act since 1913. The borough is one of 30 municipalities (of the 564) statewide that use the commission form of government. The governing body is comprised of three commissioners, who elected to concurrent four-year terms of office on a non-partisan basis as part of the May municipal elections. At a reorganization meeting held after the new council is seated, each Commissioner is assigned to oversee one of the three departments within the Borough and the Commissioners select a Mayor and may select a Deputy Mayor.

As of 2026, the borough's commissioners are Mayor Dave Siedell (Commissioner of Revenue and Finance), Itir Cole (Commissioner of Public Works, Parks and Public Property) and Frank Troy (Commissioner of Public Affairs and Public Safety), all of whom are serving concurrent terms of office ending May 15, 2029.

In 2018, the borough had an average property tax bill of $15,182, the highest in the county (though the mini municipality of Tavistock had an average bill of $31,376 for its three homes), compared to an average bill of $8,767 statewide.

==== Borough Hall ====
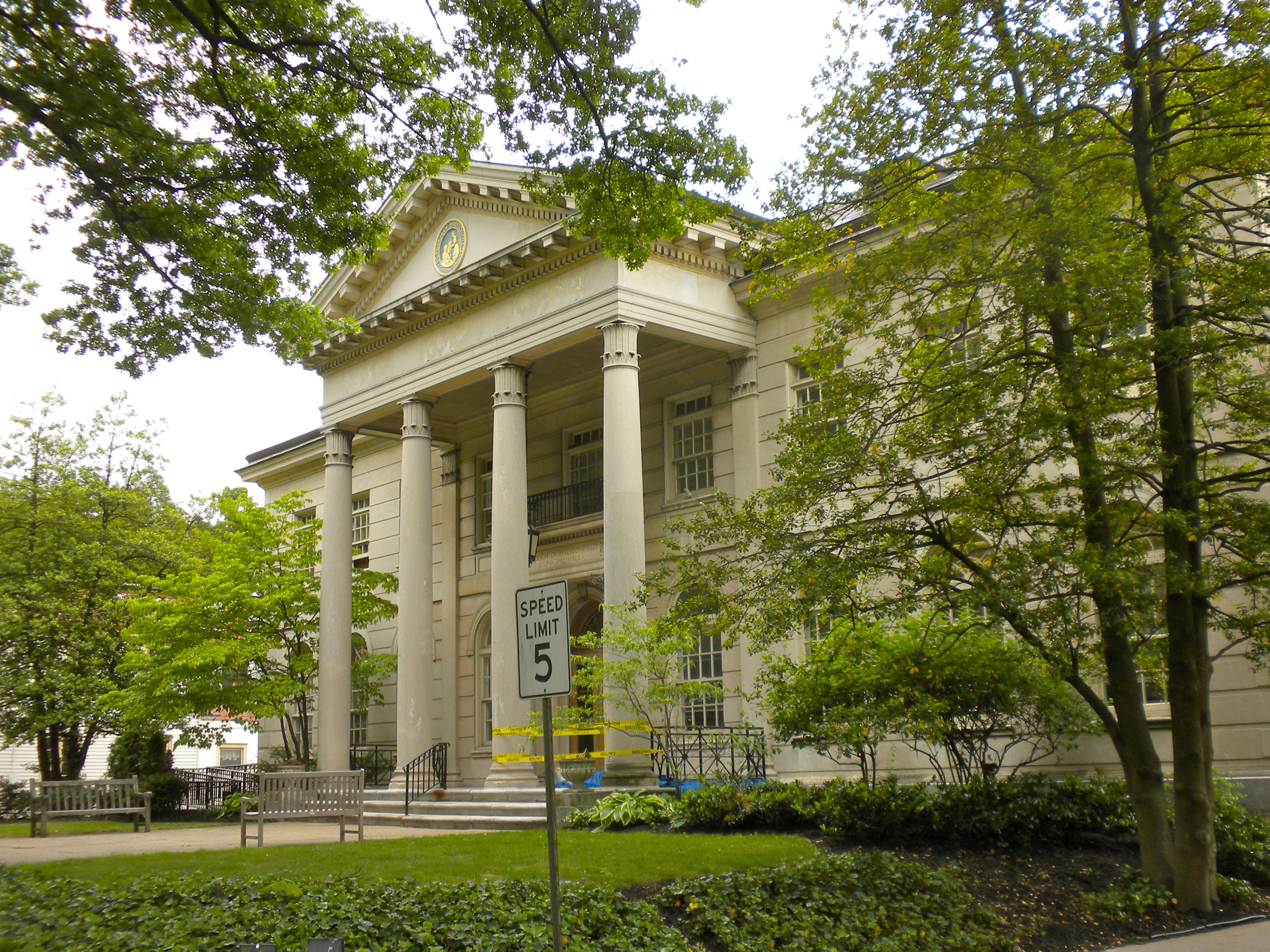
Haddonfield Borough Hall

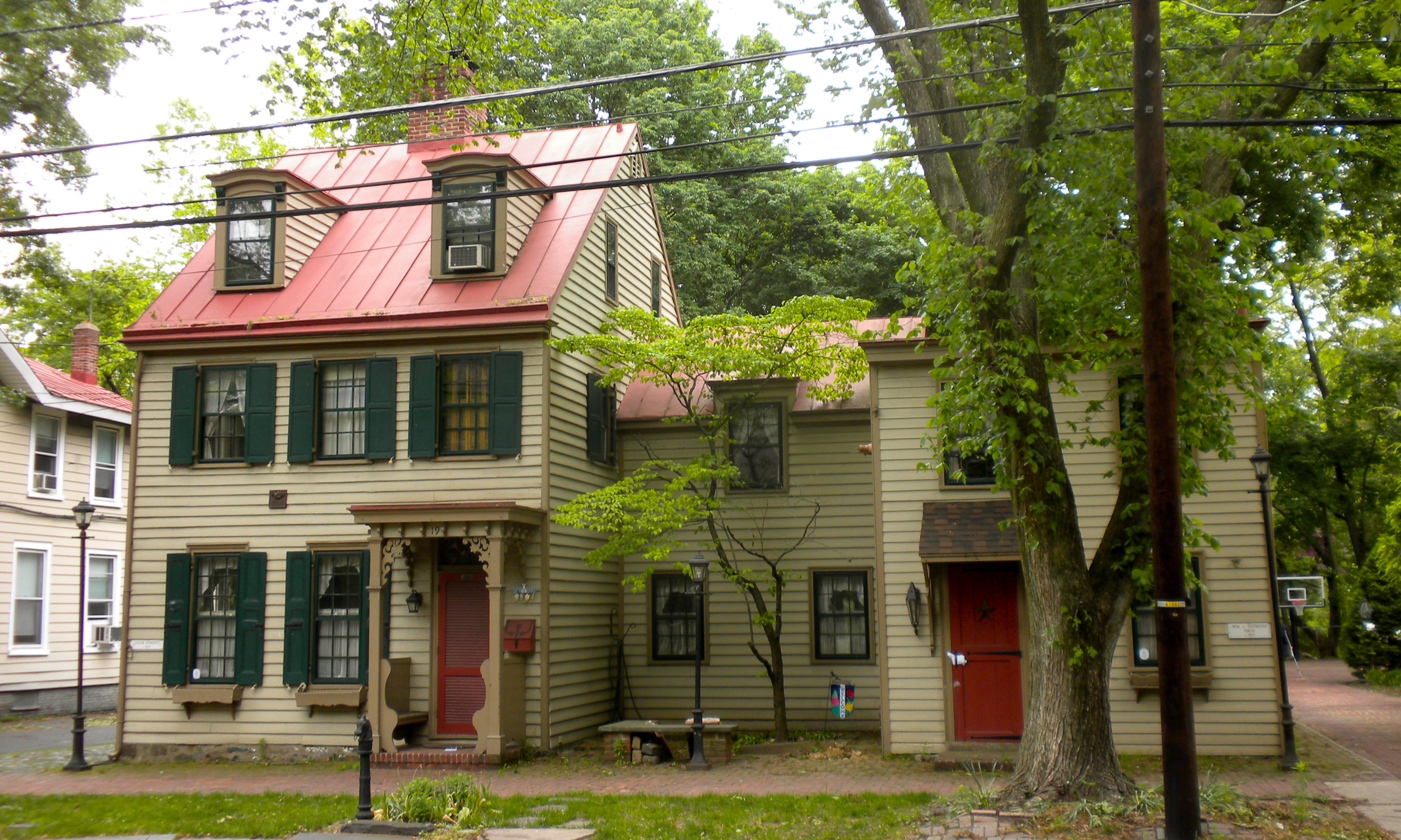
Githen's Shop c. 1830 in the Haddonfield Historic District.

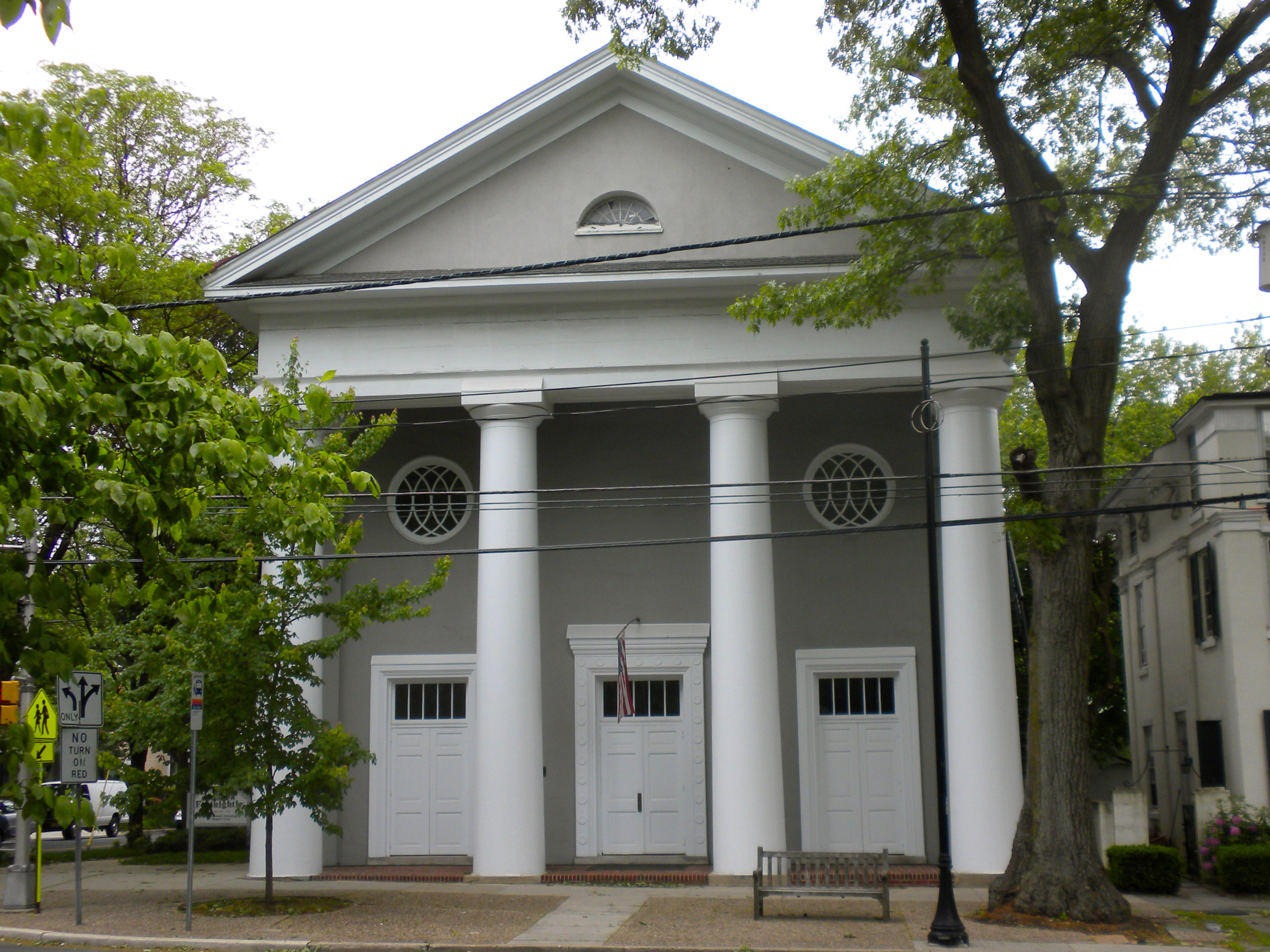
Haddon Fortnightly Club House on Kings Highway.

Borough Hall, the home of Haddonfield government, is located at 242 Kings Highway East and was built in 1928 by Walter William Sharpley. There are four main offices, including those for the tax assessor, the construction office and the municipal court office. Borough Hall includes a police department, a courtroom, and an auditorium. Its walls are of marble, steel, or plaster, although police station main walls are of steel and cinder block. From May through August 2021, the Haddonfield Police issued an average of 395 tickets per month.

In Borough Hall's auditorium are paintings of men who signed the United States Declaration of Independence from New Jersey: Abraham Clark, Francis Hopkinson, Richard Stockton, and John Witherspoon. Some of the paintings are original, other copies.

Weddings have been held in Borough Hall, and while asbestos was being removed from the public library, the upper level of Borough Hall became a temporary library.

Regular meetings of the Board of Commissioners are held twice each month, usually on Mondays, in the Borough Hall auditorium: A work session at 6:30pm at the beginning of the month and an action meeting at 7:30pm the end of the month. The dates are posted on the Borough's website.

==== Fire department ====
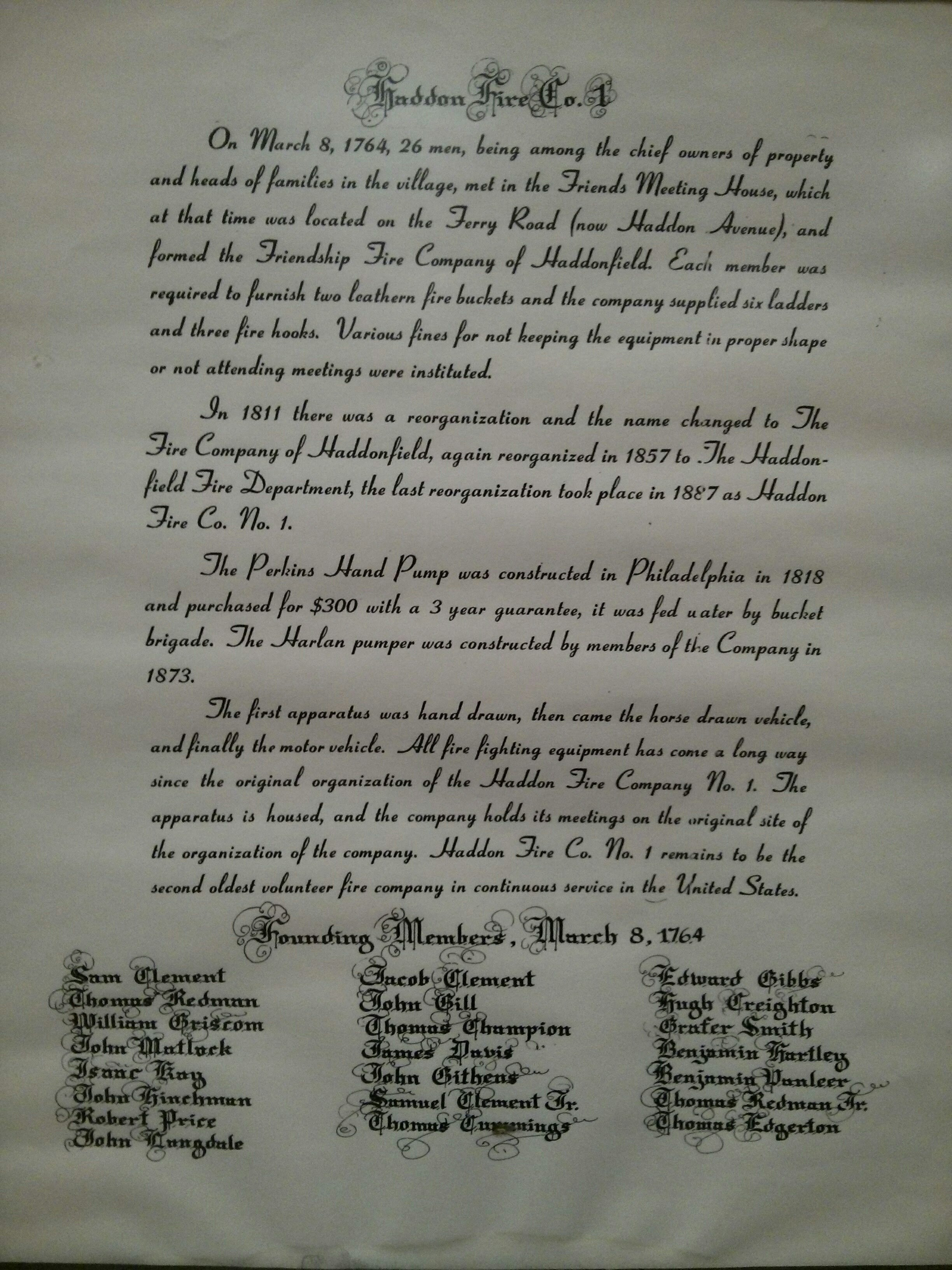
A history of the Haddonfield fire department.

Since 1764, Haddonfield has been the home of Haddon Fire Co. No. 1, the second-oldest fire department in continuous service in the United States.

=== Federal, state and county representation ===
Haddonfield is located in the 1st Congressional District and is part of New Jersey's 6th state legislative district.

For the 119th United States Congress, New Jersey's 1st congressional district is represented by Donald Norcross (D, Camden). New Jersey is represented in the United States Senate by Democrats Cory Booker (Newark, term ends 2027) and Andy Kim (Moorestown, term ends 2031).

For the 2026–2027 session, the 6th legislative district of the New Jersey Legislature is represented in the State Senate by James Beach (D, Voorhees Township) and in the General Assembly by Louis Greenwald (D, Voorhees Township) and Melinda Kane (D, Cherry Hill).

Camden County is governed by a Board of County Commissioners composed of seven members chosen at-large in partisan elections for three-year terms on a staggered basis by the residents of the county, with either two or three seats up for election each year as part of the November general election. At a reorganization meeting held in January after each election, the newly constituted Board of Commissioners selects one member to serve as Director and another as Deputy Director, each serving a one-year term in that role. As of 2025, Camden County's Commissioners are: Commissioner Director Louis Cappelli Jr. (D, Collingswood, 2026), Commissioner Deputy Director Edward T. McDonnell (D, Pennsauken Township, 2025), Virginia Ruiz Betteridge (D, Runnemede, 2025), Almar Dyer (D, Pennsauken Township, 2027), Melinda Kane (D, Cherry Hill, 2027), Jeffrey L. Nash (D, Winslow Township, 2027), and Jonathan L. Young Sr. (D, Berlin Township, 2026).

Camden County's constitutional officers are: Clerk Pamela Rosen Lampitt (D, Cherry Hill, 2029) Sheriff Chuck Billingham (D, Gloucester City, 2027) and Surrogate Michelle Gentek-Mayer (D, Gloucester Township, 2025).

=== Politics ===
As of March 2011, there were a total of 9,081 registered voters in Haddonfield, of which 3,268 (36.0%) were registered as Democrats, 2,232 (24.6%) were registered as Republicans and 3,575 (39.4%) were registered as Unaffiliated. There were 6 voters registered as Libertarians or Greens.

Gubernatorial election results for Haddonfield
Year	Republican		Democratic		Third party(ies)	
Year	No.	%	No.	%	No.	%
2025	2,014	30.97%	4,466	68.68%	23	0.35%
2021	1,909	35.16%	3,488	64.24%	33	0.61%
2017	1,578	34.91%	2,877	63.65%	65	1.44%
2013	2,519	62.14%	1,483	36.58%	52	1.28%
2009	2,208	46.86%	2,195	46.58%	309	6.56%
2005	2,152	46.64%	2,324	50.37%	138	2.99%

In the 2012 presidential election, Democrat Barack Obama received 55.3% of the vote (3,849 cast), ahead of Republican Mitt Romney with 43.9% (3,054 votes), and other candidates with 0.7% (51 votes), among the 6,985 ballots cast by the borough's 10,054 registered voters (31 ballots were spoiled), for a turnout of 69.5%. In the 2008 presidential election, Democrat Barack Obama received 59.4% of the vote (4,346 cast), ahead of Republican John McCain, who received around 38.2% (2,793 votes), with 7,311 ballots cast among the borough's 8,970 registered voters, for a turnout of 81.5%. In the 2004 presidential election, Democrat John Kerry received 54.1% of the vote (3,946 ballots cast), outpolling Republican George W. Bush, who received around 44.7% (3,264 votes), with 7,300 ballots cast among the borough's 8,912 registered voters, for a turnout percentage of 81.9.

United States presidential election results for Haddonfield
Year	Republican		Democratic		Third party(ies)	
Year	No.	%	No.	%	No.	%
2024	2,226	29.10%	5,303	69.33%	120	1.57%
2020	2,421	29.27%	5,728	69.26%	121	1.46%
2016	2,222	31.47%	4,574	64.79%	264	3.74%
2012	3,054	43.92%	3,849	55.35%	51	0.73%
2008	2,793	38.20%	4,346	59.44%	172	2.35%
2004	3,264	44.71%	3,946	54.05%	90	1.23%

In the 2013 gubernatorial election, Republican Chris Christie received 62.1% of the vote (2,519 cast), ahead of Democrat Barbara Buono with 36.6% (1,483 votes), and other candidates with 1.3% (52 votes), among the 4,147 ballots cast by the borough's 9,791 registered voters (93 ballots were spoiled), for a turnout of 42.4%. In the 2009 gubernatorial election, Republican Chris Christie received 46.9% of the vote (2,208 ballots cast), ahead of both Democrat Jon Corzine with 46.6% (2,195 votes) and Independent Chris Daggett with 5.3% (249 votes), with 4,712 ballots cast among the borough's 9,138 registered voters, yielding a 51.6% turnout.

United States Senate election results for Haddonfield1
Year	Republican		Democratic		Third party(ies)	
Year	No.	%	No.	%	No.	%
2024	2,350	31.15%	5,148	68.23%	47	0.62%
2018	2,287	37.21%	3,595	58.49%	264	4.30%
2012	2,871	36.23%	4,820	60.82%	234	2.95%
2006	2,469	46.47%	2,770	52.14%	74	1.39%

United States Senate election results for Haddonfield2
Year	Republican		Democratic		Third party(ies)	
Year	No.	%	No.	%	No.	%
2020	2,752	33.53%	5,400	65.79%	56	0.68%
2014	1,776	41.19%	2,489	57.72%	47	1.09%
2013	1,147	38.26%	1,833	61.14%	18	0.60%
2008	3,280	47.67%	3,524	51.21%	77	1.12%

== Education ==
=== Public schools ===
The Haddonfield Public Schools is a comprehensive public school district serving students in pre-kindergarten through twelfth grade. The district serves students from Haddonfield, along with those from Tavistock who attend the district's schools as part of sending/receiving relationships. As of the 2022–23 school year, the district, comprised of five schools, had an enrollment of 2,766 students and 209.5 classroom teachers (on an FTE basis), for a student–teacher ratio of 13.2:1. Schools in the district (with 2022–23 enrollment data from the National Center for Education Statistics) are Central Elementary School with 437 students in grades PreK-5, Elizabeth Haddon Elementary School with 376 students in grades PreK-5, J. Fithian Tatem Elementary School with 432 students in grades PreK-5, Haddonfield Middle School with 647 students in grades 6-8 and Haddonfield Memorial High School with 866 students in grades 9-12.

In 2023, J. Fithian Tatem Elementary School was one of nine schools in New Jersey that was recognized as a National Blue Ribbon School by the United States Department of Education. In 2015, Elizabeth Haddon School was one of 15 schools in the state and one of nine public schools, recognized as a National Blue Ribbon School in the exemplary high performing category. Haddonfield Memorial High School was also awarded the National Blue Ribbon School Award of Excellence in 2004-05 by the United States Department of Education, the highest award an American school can receive. In 2023, J. Fithian Tatem Elementary School became the third Haddonfield public school to receive the award. Additionally, Haddonfield Memorial High School was ranked 33rd in public high school in New Jersey out of 328 schools statewide in New Jersey Monthly magazine's September 2012 cover story on the state's "Top Public High Schools", after being ranked 11th in 2010 out of 322 schools listed.

=== Private schools ===
Haddonfield Friends School, a Quaker school that dates back to 1786, served 167 students in Pre-K through eighth grade.

Kingsway Learning Center provides special education for students from ages birth to 14 at the Haddonfield campus, which is home to the school's Early Intervention Program and its Elementary Program. The school closed down in 2019, and was purchased by the Haddonfield Board of Education in February 2023 for $1.495 million. The district plans on converting the building into a fullday kindergarten and preschool by 2025.

Christ the King Regional School, founded in 1940, serves students in Pre-K3 through eighth grade and operates under the auspices of the Roman Catholic Diocese of Camden.

Bancroft School, founded in Haddonfield in 1883 and located there until 2017, is special education school and neurobehavioral stabilization program. In July 2005, Bancroft began soliciting requests for proposals to purchase its 20-acre (81,000 m^{2}) property, as a precursor to moving from Haddonfield. Bancroft is now located in neighboring Mount Laurel, but during the late 2010s, redevelopment of the Bancroft property in Haddonfield became a locally contentious issue and remains to be resolved.

The Beechwood School, founded in 1951, is a private pre-school educating children 2.5 through 6 years old.

== Special events ==
There are events such as the community sidewalk sale in the summer, and the fall festival in October. The fall festival is an event where community organizations may have booths along Kings Highway and there is scarecrow-making for kids. Haddonfield hosts a weekly farmers' market on Saturdays from May to November. There is also the Haddonfield Crafts & Fine Arts Festival, where a large variety of vendors line the main street. Another event is First Night, a New Year's Eve celebration of the arts, with a variety of performances was held in town until 2016. There is also a yearly car show that takes place during the second Saturday of September. There are also events such as historic house tours and designer show houses.

There is also an annual skirmish that takes place on Kings Highway East in June every year, hosted by the Haddonfield Historical Society. Residents of Haddonfield dress as redcoats and militia men, reenacting the battle that took place as the British retreated from the Battle of Red Bank. Their efforts to "annoy" the redcoats worked as Gen. Washington defeated the British army at the Battle of Monmouth a month later. The event includes many additional activities such as a yelling contest, colonial dancing, pillory prisoners, character reenactors, and tours of Historic Haddonfield.

== Transportation ==
Haddonfield prides itself on being very walkable; most streets have sidewalks, and due to the small size of the town—2 miles (3.2 km) or less from any point in Haddonfield to any other as the crow flies—it is possible to walk to any part of the community. The Borough presently has a traffic campaign using the slogan "Haddonfield Drives 25" promoting the borough's speed limit as 25 mph (40 km/h) for all streets and roadways.

=== Roads and highways ===
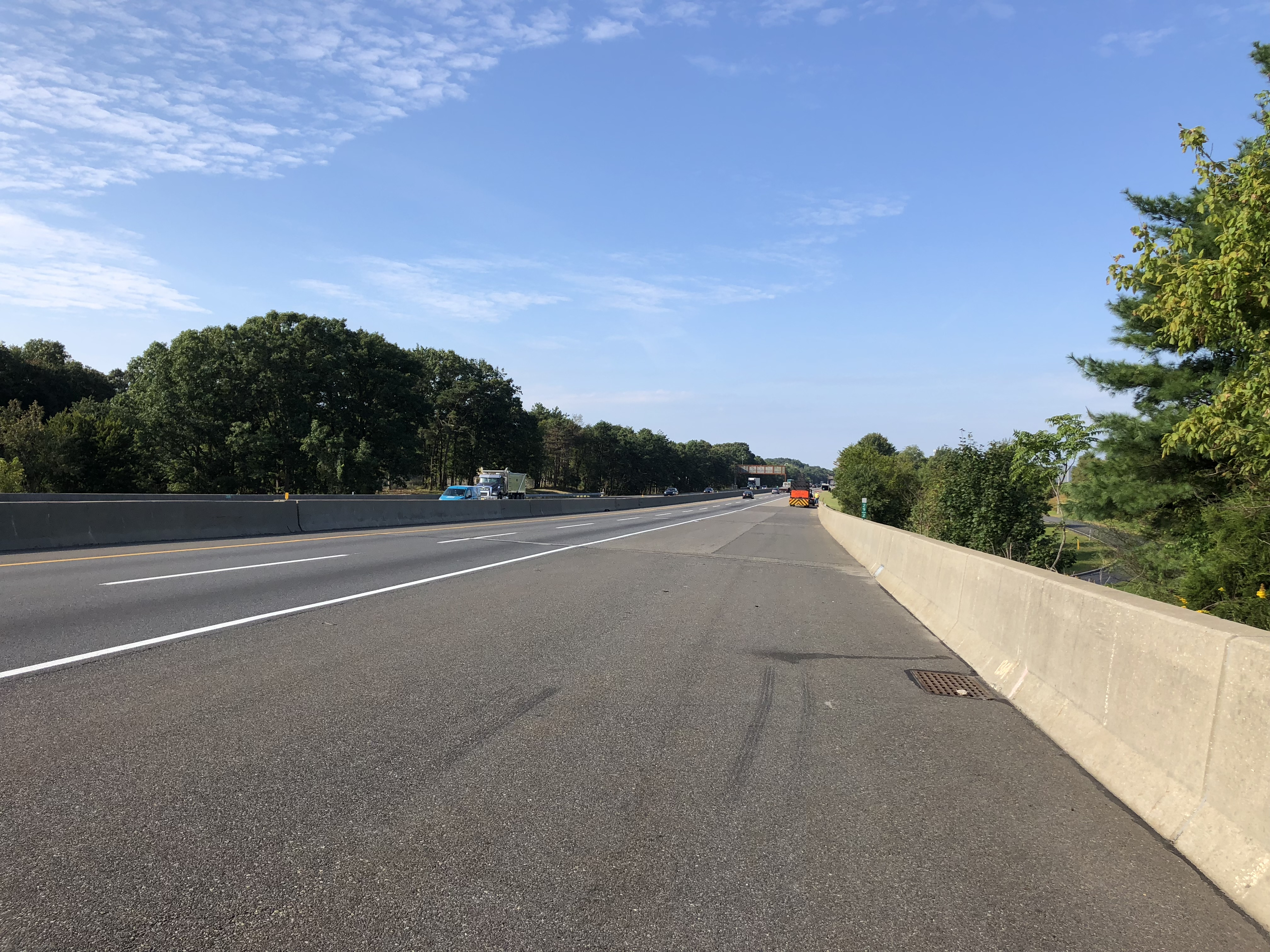
The southbound New Jersey Turnpike in Haddonfield

As of May 2010, the borough had a total of 46.74 miles (75.22 km) of roadways, of which 37.67 miles (60.62 km) were maintained by the municipality, 8.85 miles (14.24 km) by Camden County, 0.09 miles (0.14 km) by the New Jersey Department of Transportation, and 0.13 miles (0.21 km) by the New Jersey Turnpike Authority.

Route 41 (Kings Highway) passes through the center of the borough and intersects County Route 561 (Haddon Avenue) at Haddonfield's main business district. Interstate 295 is adjacent to the southern tip with Exit 31 straddling the border. The New Jersey Turnpike briefly crosses through the borough, but the closest exit is Interchange 3 in Bellmawr / Runnemede.

=== Public transportation ===
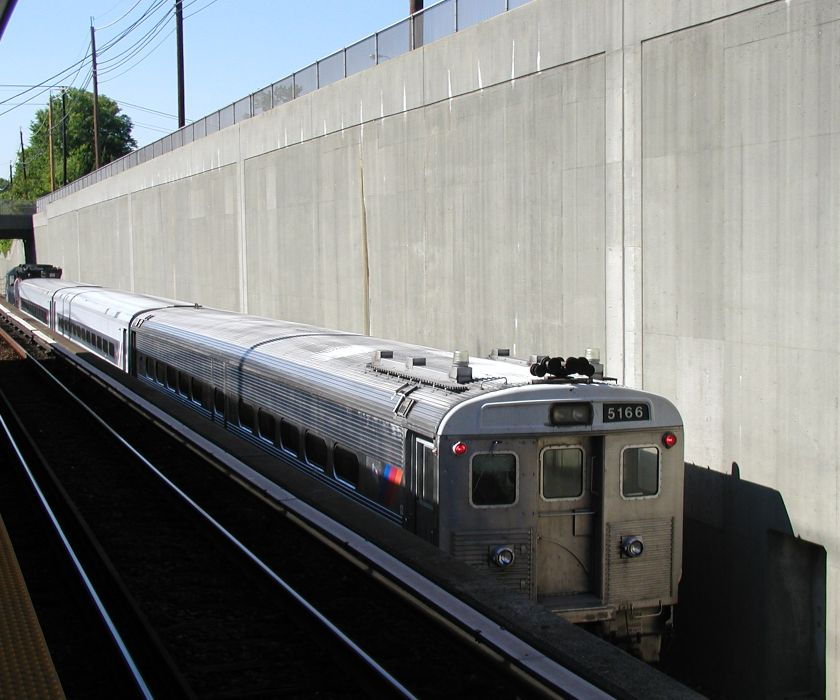
Train at Haddonfield station

The PATCO Speedline Haddonfield station links it to Philadelphia, Pennsylvania, in the west and to the eastern terminus in Lindenwold, New Jersey, where it is possible to transfer to NJ Transit's bus and rail routes connecting Philadelphia to Atlantic City.

NJ Transit provides local bus service; its 451, 455, and 457 routes all stop at the PATCO station.

== Popular culture ==
- In the film When Harry Met Sally... (directed by Rob Reiner), Billy Crystal's character, Harry, is from Haddonfield.
- Several films in the Halloween franchise are set in fictional Haddonfield, Illinois which was inspired by Haddonfield, N.J. Debra Hill, the co-writer of the original film, grew up in Haddonfield, New Jersey.
- A scene in the film AI takes place in Haddonfield and captures a shot of a house on Kings Highway. This is the location of the Flesh Fair, a rally of anti-robot activists.
- Photographer Frank Stefanko took two famous album covers for Bruce Springsteen in Haddonfield: Darkness on the Edge of Town (1978) and The River (1980).

== Notable people ==
People who were born in, residents of, or otherwise closely associated with Haddonfield include:

- John Adler (1959–2011), politician who served as the U.S. representative for New Jersey's 3rd congressional district from 2009 until 2011
- Graham Alexander (born 1989), singer-songwriter, entertainer, and entrepreneur known for the Broadway shows Rain: A Tribute to the Beatles and Let It Be and as the founder of a new incarnation of the Victor Talking Machine Co.
- Abraham Anderson (1829–1915), businessman who was a co-founder of the Campbell's
- Chris Barrett (born 1982), filmmaker
- Curtis Bashaw (born 1960), real estate developer, entrepreneur and businessman, Republican nominee for the 2024 United States Senate election in New Jersey
- George Batten (1891–1972), second baseman who played in a single MLB game, for the New York Highlanders
- Aimee Belgard (born 1974), lawyer and politician who serves as a judge in New Jersey Superior Court
- Brian Boucher (born 1977), NHL goalie
- Sam Bradford (born 1987), former Heisman Trophy winner who was quarterback for 4 NFL teams from 2010 to 2018 including the longest stint being with St. Louis Rams
- Andy Breckman (born 1955), film and television writer whose work includes Monk
- Daniel Brière (born 1977), NHL player
- Alexander Oswald Brodie (1849–1918), military officer and engineer who was appointed as Governor of Arizona Territory from 1902 to 1905
- Robert Byrd (born 1942), author and illustrator
- William T. Cahill (1912–1996), Governor of New Jersey (1970–1974)
- Joanna Cassidy (born 1945), actress, born and raised in Haddonfield
- Bobby Clarke (born 1949), former hockey player and executive with the Philadelphia Flyers
- Edward Drinker Cope (1840–1897), paleontologist and comparative anatomist, lived in Haddonfield to be closer to fossils in nearby marl pits
- James A. Corea (1937–2001), radio personality and specialist in nutrition, rehabilitation and sports medicine
- William K. Dickey (1920–2008), politician who served as Speaker of the New Jersey General Assembly and as chairman of the Delaware River Port Authority
- Greg Dobbs (born 1978), MLB player who played for the Philadelphia Phillies
- Erin Donohue (born 1983), athlete. Member of the U.S. track and field team at 2008 Summer Olympics (Beijing) in the 1500 meters
- Quaesita Cromwell Drake (1889–1967), chemist who was a professor and chair of the chemistry department at the University of Delaware for 38 years
- Alfred E. Driscoll (1902–1975), Governor of New Jersey (1947–1954), lived most of his life in historic Birdwood home built by John Estaugh Hopkins on Hopkins Lane
- Kevin Eastman (born 1955), basketball coach
- Rawly Eastwick (born 1950), former MLB relief pitcher
- Ray Emery (born 1982), NHL goalie
- Elmer Engstrom (1901–1984), President of Radio Corporation of America (RCA) who led development of television in Camden during the 1930s
- Bartholomew J. Eustace (1887–1956), Bishop of Camden from 1938 to 1956
- Ilise Feitshans, global health lawyer working in the field of nanotechnology
- Jena Friedman, comedian, writer and host of the comedic true-crime series Indefensible
- Michael Garvey (born 1988), former rugby league footballer for the Philadelphia Fight in the USA Rugby League, who played for the United States men's national rugby league team at the 2013 World Cup
- Claude Giroux (born 1988), NHL player
- Christian Giudice (born 1974), boxing writer and editor who has published boxing biographies
- Thomas McLernon Greene (1926–2003), scholar of English literature
- Dan Gutman (born 1955), author
- Marielle Hall (born 1992), long-distance runner
- Bryce Harper (born 1992), MLB first baseman for the Philadelphia Phillies
- Derian Hatcher (born 1972), NHL player and coach for Philadelphia Flyers
- Debra Hill (1950–2005), co-writer and producer of the film Halloween which is set in the fictional town of Haddonfield, Illinois
- Jeff Hornacek (born 1963), NBA player, head coach of Phoenix Suns, lived in Haddonfield while playing for the Philadelphia 76ers
- Geoff Jenkins (born 1974), former MLB outfielder
- Pam Jenoff (born 1971, class of 1989), author of Quill award-nominated The Kommandant's Girl
- Chip Kelly (born 1963), head coach of the UCLA Bruins
- Susan Kilham (1943–2022), aquatic ecologist
- David Laganella (born 1974), avant-garde classical composer hailed as Philadelphia's best by the American Composers Orchestra
- Ian Laperrière (born 1974), NHL player and coach for the Philadelphia Flyers
- Brad Lidge (born 1976), relief pitcher for the Philadelphia Phillies
- Victoria Lombardi (born 1952), better known as Miss Vicki, the former wife of Tiny Tim
- Mike Magill (1920–2006), race car driver who competed in the Indianapolis 500 three times
- Matt Maloney (born 1971), NBA player for the Houston Rockets, attended Christ the King and Haddonfield Memorial High School
- Charlie Manuel (born 1944), former manager of the Philadelphia Phillies
- Timothy Matlack (1736–1829), American Revolutionary War soldier and engrosser of the United States Declaration of Independence
- Bob McElwee (born 1935), former on-field football official for 41 years, including 27 years in the National Football League from 1976 to 2003
- Joel McHale (born 1971), comedian and actor, star of NBC sitcom Community, lived in Haddonfield for two years during elementary school
- Richard Mroz, president of the New Jersey Board of Public Utilities from 2014 to 2018
- George F. Neutze (1908–1969), politician who represented Camden County in the New Jersey General Assembly
- Scott Patterson (born 1958), actor, played Luke on television series Gilmore Girls
- Sergio Peresson (1913–1991), violin maker
- Chris Pronger (born 1974), NHL player
- Mike Richards (born 1985), NHL player
- Marvin Roffman, author and former financial analyst known for his insights into the gambling industry
- James Rolfe (born 1980), creator of Angry Video Game Nerd
- Rod Searle (1920–2014), farmer, insurance agent, and politician who served for 24 years in the Minnesota House of Representatives
- Jennifer Sey (born 1969), author, business executive and retired artistic gymnast who was the 1986 U.S. Women's All-Around National Champion
- Mel Sheppard (1883–1942), middle-distance runner who won a total of four gold medals at the 1908 Summer Olympics and 1912 Summer Olympics
- Thomas J. Shusted (1926–2004), attorney and politician who served in the New Jersey General Assembly on two separate occasions, representing Legislative District 3D from 1970 to 1972 and the 6th Legislative District from 1978 to 1991
- Tom Sims (1950–2012), pioneer and world champion of snowboarding, who created an early version after failing to complete a custom skateboard
- Jason Smith (born 1973), NHL player
- Steven Spielberg (born 1946), film director, as a child lived in Crystal Terrace, a part of Haddon Township served by the Haddonfield post office
- Frank Stefanko (born 1946), photographer of rock music subjects including Bruce Springsteen and Patti Smith
- I. F. Stone (1907–1989), author and anti-war activist
- Kimmo Timonen (born 1975), NHL defenseman for Philadelphia Flyers
- Joseph F. Wallworth, President of the New Jersey Senate
- Eric Weinrich (born 1966), NHL player, lived in Haddonfield while playing for Philadelphia Flyers
