= Haddonfield Historic District =

Historic district in New Jersey, United States

- U.S. National Register of Historic Places
- U.S. Historic district
- New Jersey Register of Historic Places
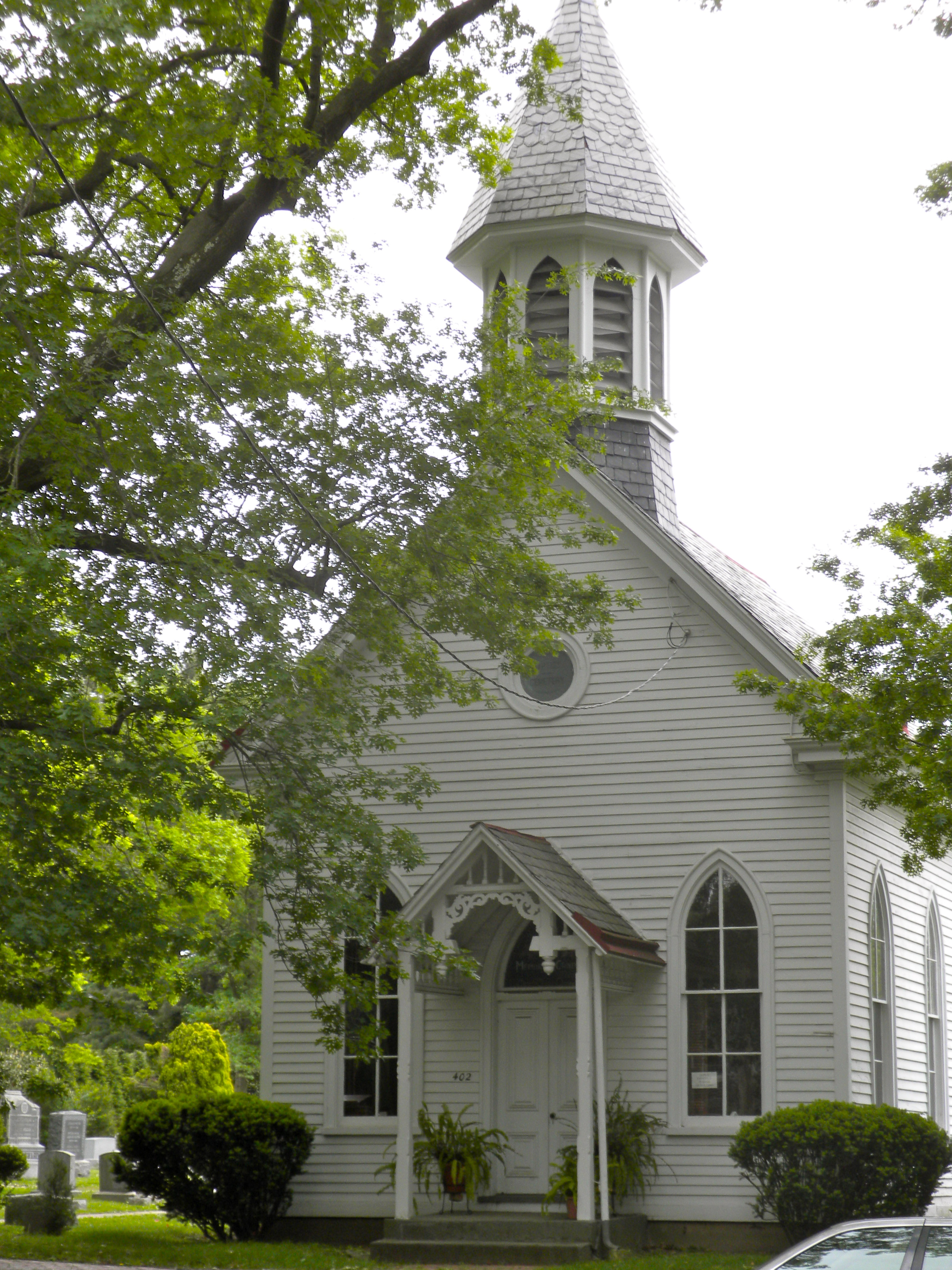

- Location within Camden County, New Jersey Location within New Jersey Location within the United States
- Location: Roughly bounded by Washington, Hopkins, Summit, and E. Park Avenues, and Kings Highway, Haddonfield, New Jersey
- Coordinates: 39°53′49″N 75°2′0″W
- Area: 203 acres (82 ha)
- Built: 1701
- Architectural style: Mid 19th Century Revival, Late Victorian, Federal
- NRHP reference No.: 82003270
- NJRHP No.: 973

Significant dates
- Added to NRHP: July 21, 1982
- Designated NJRHP: April 18, 1980

Haddonfield Historic District is located in Haddonfield, Camden County, New Jersey, United States. The district was added to the New Jersey Register of Historic Places on April 18, 1980, and the National Register of Historic Places on July 21, 1982.

== See also ==
- National Register of Historic Places listings in Camden County, New Jersey
