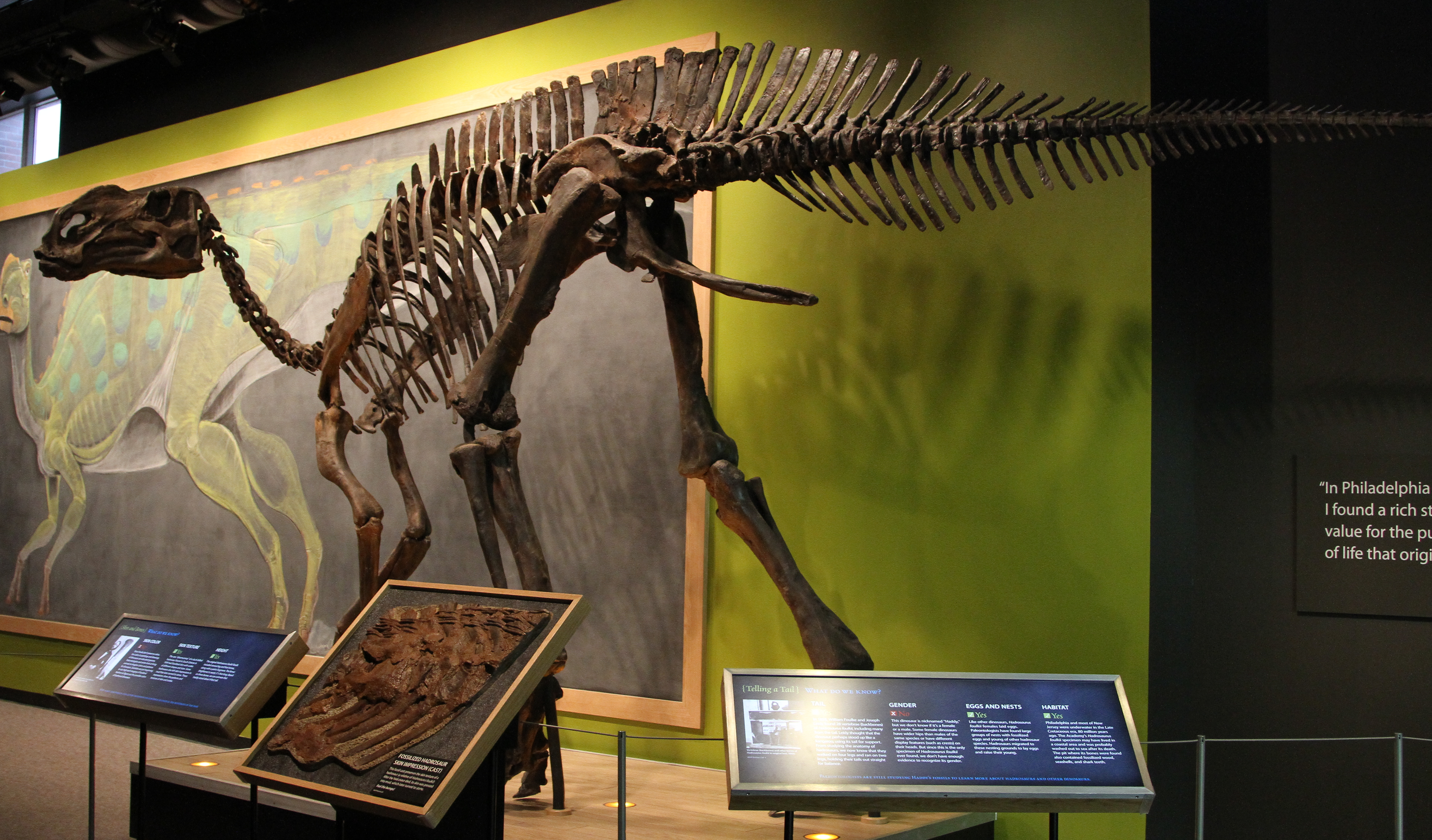
- Reconstructed skeleton, Academy of Natural Sciences

Scientific classification
- Kingdom: Animalia
- Phylum: Chordata
- Class: Reptilia
- Clade: Dinosauria
- Clade: †Ornithischia
- Clade: †Ornithopoda
- Family: †Hadrosauridae
- Subfamily: †Hadrosaurinae
- Genus: †Hadrosaurus; Leidy, 1858

Type species
- †Hadrosaurus foulkii Leidy, 1858

Synonyms
- Trachodon foulkii (Leidy, 1858) Lydekker, 1888; Hadrosaurus cavatus (Cope, 1871)

= Hadrosaurus =

Hadrosaurus Temporal range: Late Cretaceous, ~83.6–77.9 Ma Possible Maastrichtian Record

Hadrosaurid dinosaur genus from the Late Cretaceous

Hadrosaurus (/ˌhædrəˈsɔːrəs/; lit. 'bulky lizard') is a genus of hadrosaurid ornithopod dinosaurs that lived in North America during the Late Cretaceous Period in what is now the Woodbury Formation in New Jersey about 83.6 to 77.9 million years ago. The holotype specimen was found in fluvial marine sedimentation, meaning that the corpse of the animal was transported by a river and washed out to sea. Some fossils are found in the Tar Heel/Coachman Formation.

They were large animals ranging from 7 to 8 m (23 to 26 ft) in length and 2 to 4 t (2.2 to 4.4 short tons) in weight. Most of the preserved elements are very robust, unusual traits in hadrosaurs. Hadrosaurus were ponderously built animals equipped with keratinous beaks for cropping foliage and a specialized and complex dentition for food processing. Hadrosaurus foulkii, the only species in this genus, is known from a single specimen consisting of much of the skeleton and parts of the skull. The specimen was collected in 1858 and represents the first dinosaur species known from more than isolated teeth to be identified in North America. Using radiometric dating of bivalve shells from the Woodbury Formation, the sedimentary rocks where the Hadrosaurus fossil was found have been dated at some time during the Campanian stage. In 1868, the only known specimen became the first-ever dinosaur skeleton to be mounted. In 1991, Hadrosaurus became the official state dinosaur of New Jersey.

== History of discovery ==
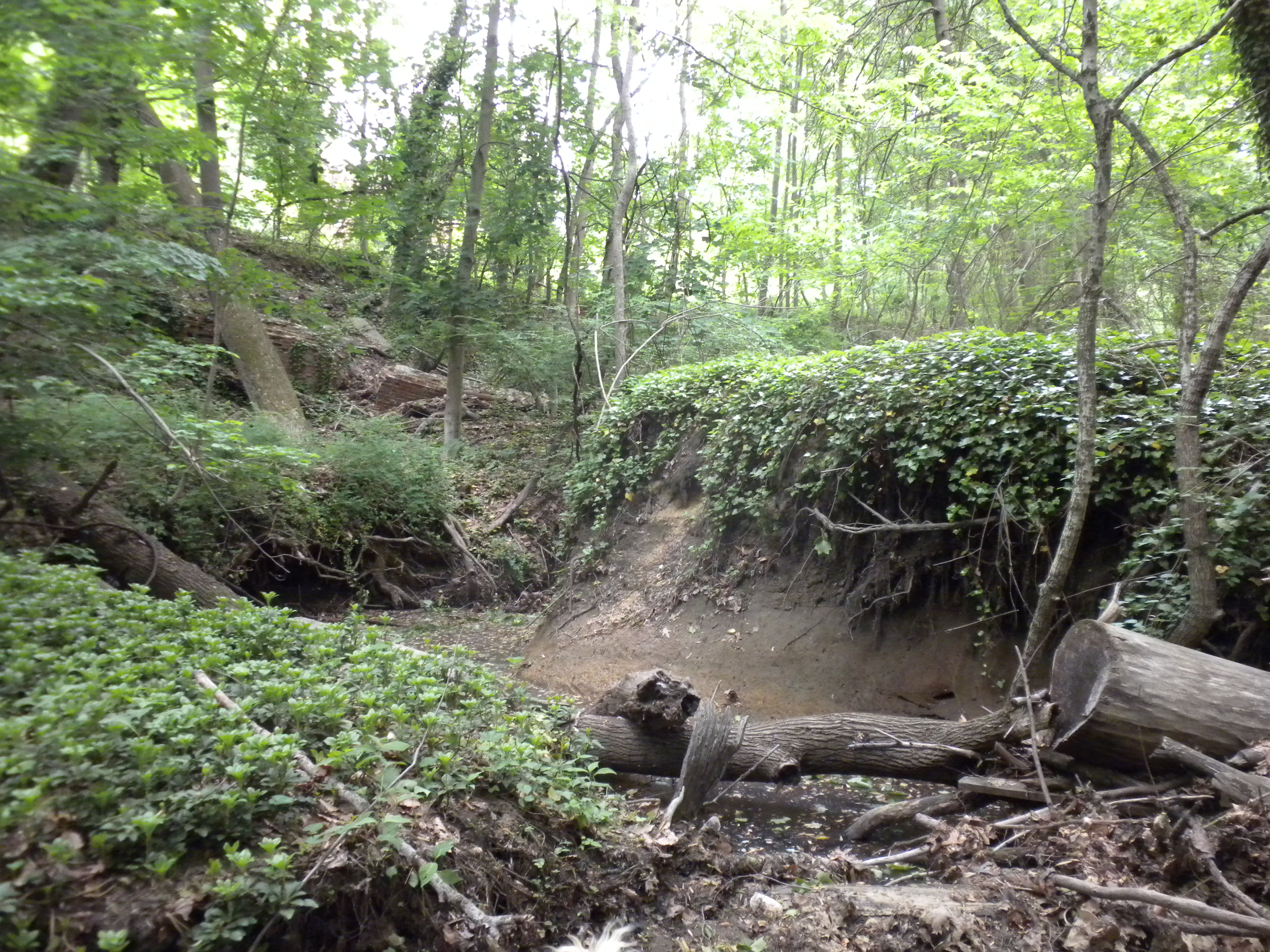
Photograph of the site where the fossils were found (2010)

In 1838, John Estaugh Hopkins was digging in a marl pit (on a small tributary of the Cooper River in Haddonfield, New Jersey, and part of the Campanian-age Woodbury Formation) when he uncovered large bones. He put them on display at his home, also in Haddonfield. In 1858, the bones sparked the interest of a visitor, William Parker Foulke, who dug out the rest of the bones from the marl pit in the same year. The excavation site, known as the Hadrosaurus foulkii Leidy Site, is now a National Historic Landmark.

Foulke contacted paleontologist Joseph Leidy, and together they recovered eight teeth from the maxillar and dentary areas, dental battery fragments, left maxilla fragments, three partial dorsal vertebrae, 13 caudal centra, including an almost complete middle caudal vertebra. Other fragments included a partial right coracoid, left humerus, left radius, left ulna, left ilium, right ischium, right partial pubis, the left hindlimb composed by the femur, tibia, fibula with metatarsals II and IV and the first pedal phalanx from the third digit. Foulke and Leidy studied the fossils together and, in 1858, Leidy formally described and named Hadrosaurus foulkii in honor of his collaborator. While originally a portmanteau of Haddonfield, the location of its discovery with the accepted suffix for dinosaurs -saurus, the name Hadrosaurus was scientifically justified as deriving from the Greek ἁδρός, hadros, meaning "bulky" or "large", and σαῦρος, sauros, meaning "lizard". The name was an additional play on words by Leidy since it translates from Greek as Foulke's big lizard.

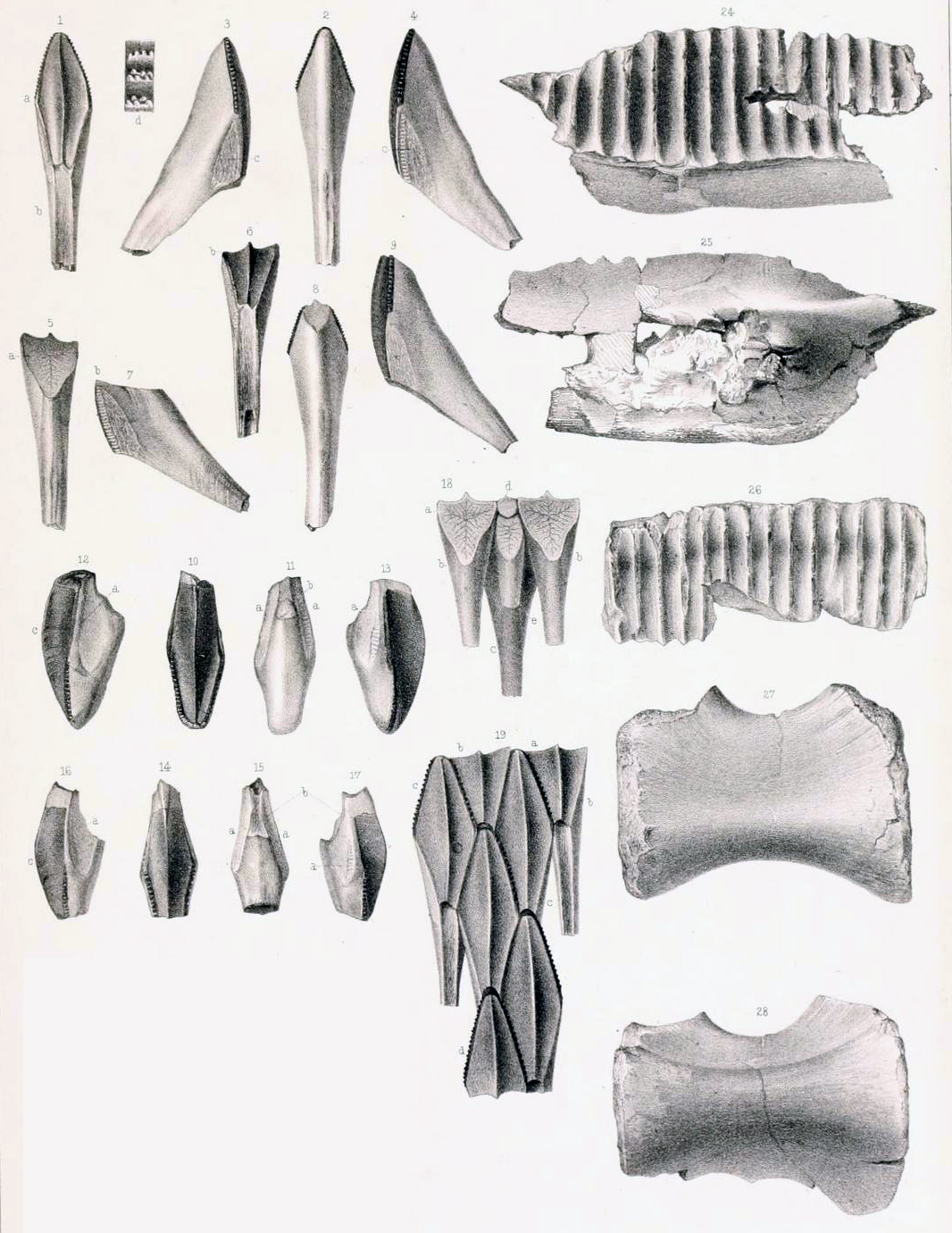
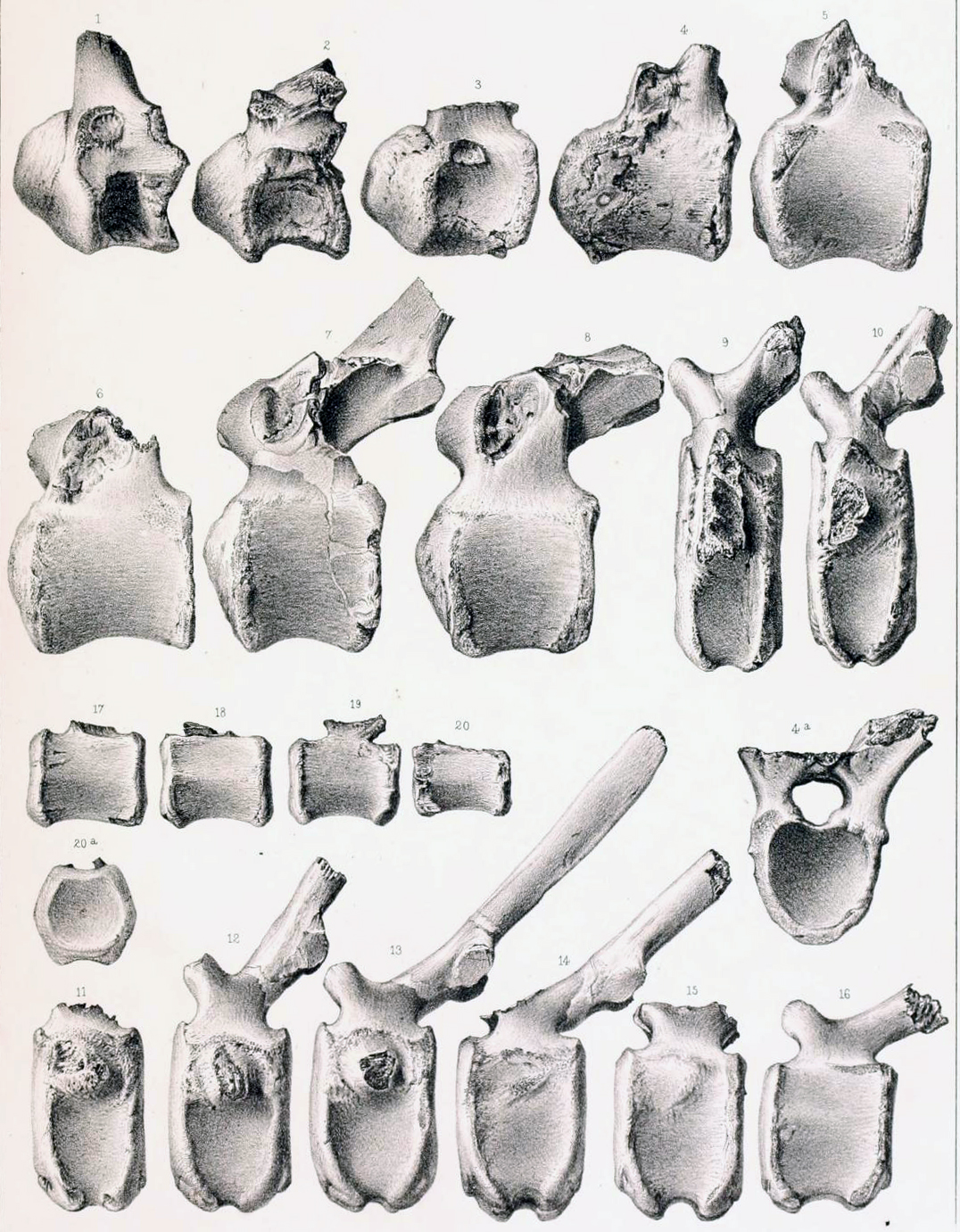
Plates showing skull elements and vertebrae from Leidy's 1858 description

Leidy recognized that the bones were from a dinosaur because of their similarity to those of Iguanodon, discovered in England some decades before but, at the time, the skeleton of Hadrosaurus was one of the most complete dinosaur skeletons known. Leidy's monograph Cretaceous Reptiles of the United States, describing Hadrosaurus more completely, and with illustrations, was written in 1860, but the American Civil War delayed its publication until 1865.

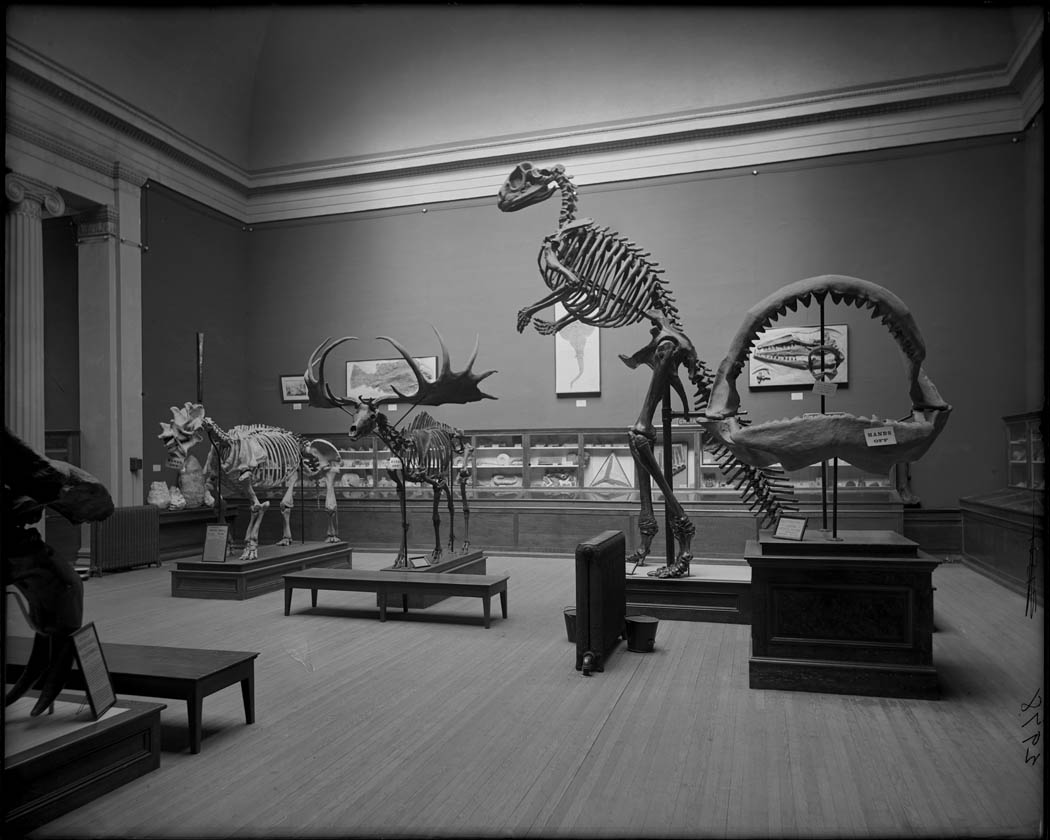
Benjamin Waterhouse Hawkins mounted Hadrosaurus (background), the first mounted dinosaur skeleton in the world

Leidy reconstructed Hadrosaurus as a biped, in contrast to the view at the time that such dinosaurs were quadrupedal. The entire skeleton was completely assembled in 1868 by a team including English sculptor and naturalist Benjamin Waterhouse Hawkins and was put on display at Philadelphia Academy of Natural Sciences. It was the first-ever mounted dinosaur skeleton. When the skeleton was first put together, it was displayed with a plaster skull sculpted by Hawkins. Many other artists have recreated Hadrosaurus with skulls from other, related species such as Gryposaurus and Brachylophosaurus. A statue of Hadrosaurus, sculpted by Haddonfield resident John Giannotti, now stands in the center of the town of Haddonfield along Kings Highway East, commemorating its discovery there. Thanks to Joyce Berry and her fourth-grade classes (1988–1991) at Strawbridge Elementary School in Haddon Township, New Jersey, the Hadrosaurus was named the state dinosaur of New Jersey in 1991. It is one of the most celebrated dinosaurs ever and is of great historic importance. The skeleton is usually kept out of sight in the Academy's collections. However, from November 22, 2008, to April 19, 2009, a fully assembled cast of the skeleton, and an exhibit about the science and culture surrounding the dinosaur's discovery, was open to the public, and on 16 July 2025 the cast was returned to permanent display.

The Hadrosaurus discovered in Haddonfield is today one of the featured exhibits of the Edelman Fossil Park & Museum of Rowan University in nearby Mantua Township, which opened on March 29, 2025. The museum, built on a former marl quarry of the same Late Cretaceous deposits, presents the Haddonfield discovery alongside the fossils excavated at its own site.

== Description ==
Size compared to a human

Hadrosaurus were large-sized animals growing up to 7–8 metres (23–26 ft) and weighing as much as 2 to 4 t (2.2 to 4.4 short tons). According to Prieto-Márquez, Hadrosaurus can be distinguished in having a shortened pectoral crest that is slightly over 40% of the total humeral length, a deltopectoral crest that is developed from the humeral shaft causing the laterodistal border to display a broad lateral facet, a lower greatest point of the supraacetabular crest located above lateral edge from the rear to the bottom on the posterior tuberosity of the ischial peduncle of the ilium, a shortened supraacetabular crest from the front to the rear with its breadth being half the length of the middle iliac plate.

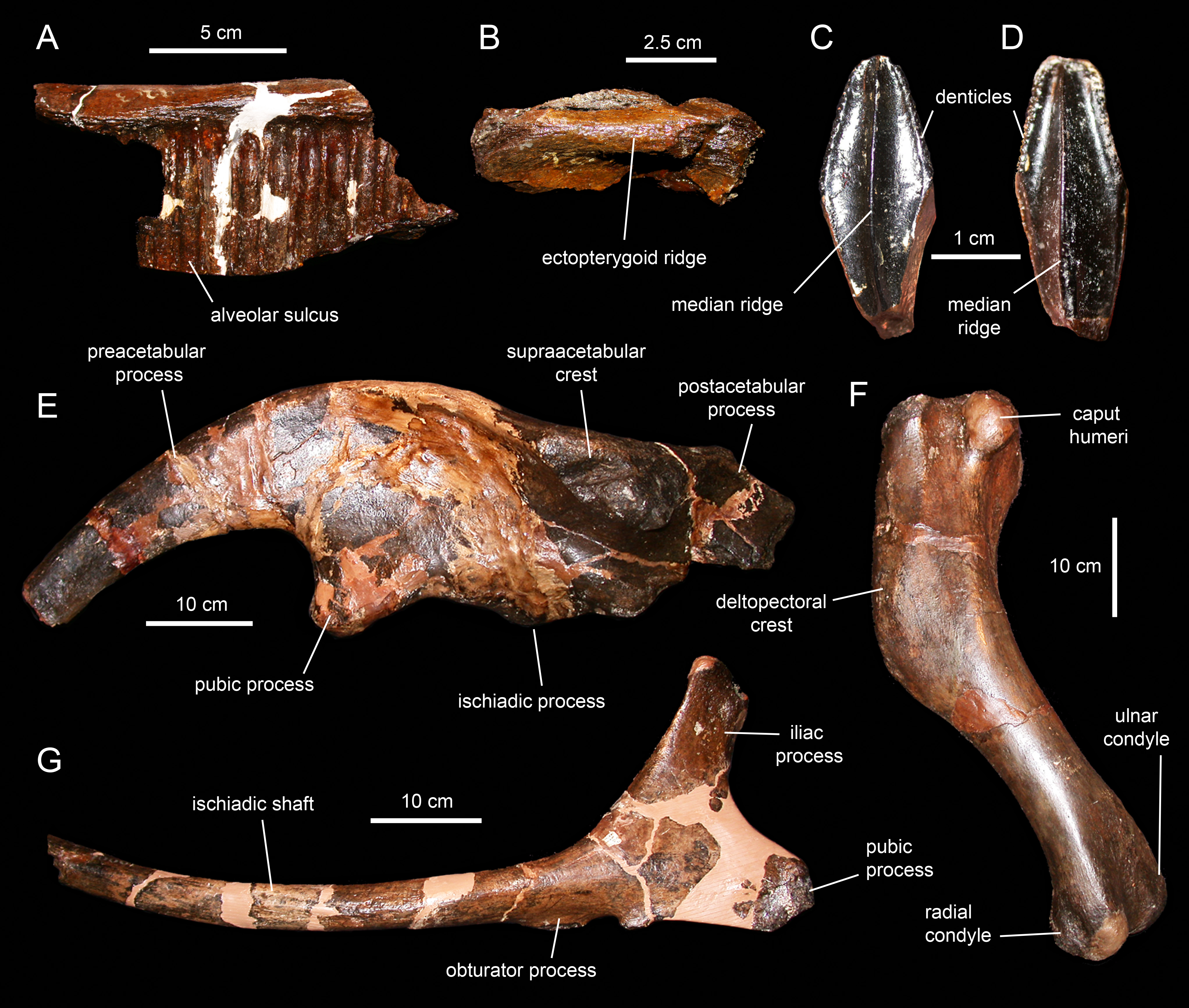
Cranial and postcranial elements from the holotype

As in most hadrosaurs, the forelimbs were not as heavily built as the hindlimbs, but were long enough to be used in standing or movement. The holotype specimen was a relatively large animal at the time of death with a 1.05-meter-long (105 cm) femur and 93.3-centimeter-long (933 mm) tibia. Most of the preserved elements feature a marked robust composition with the fibula being one of the most robust among hadrosaurs.

== Classification ==
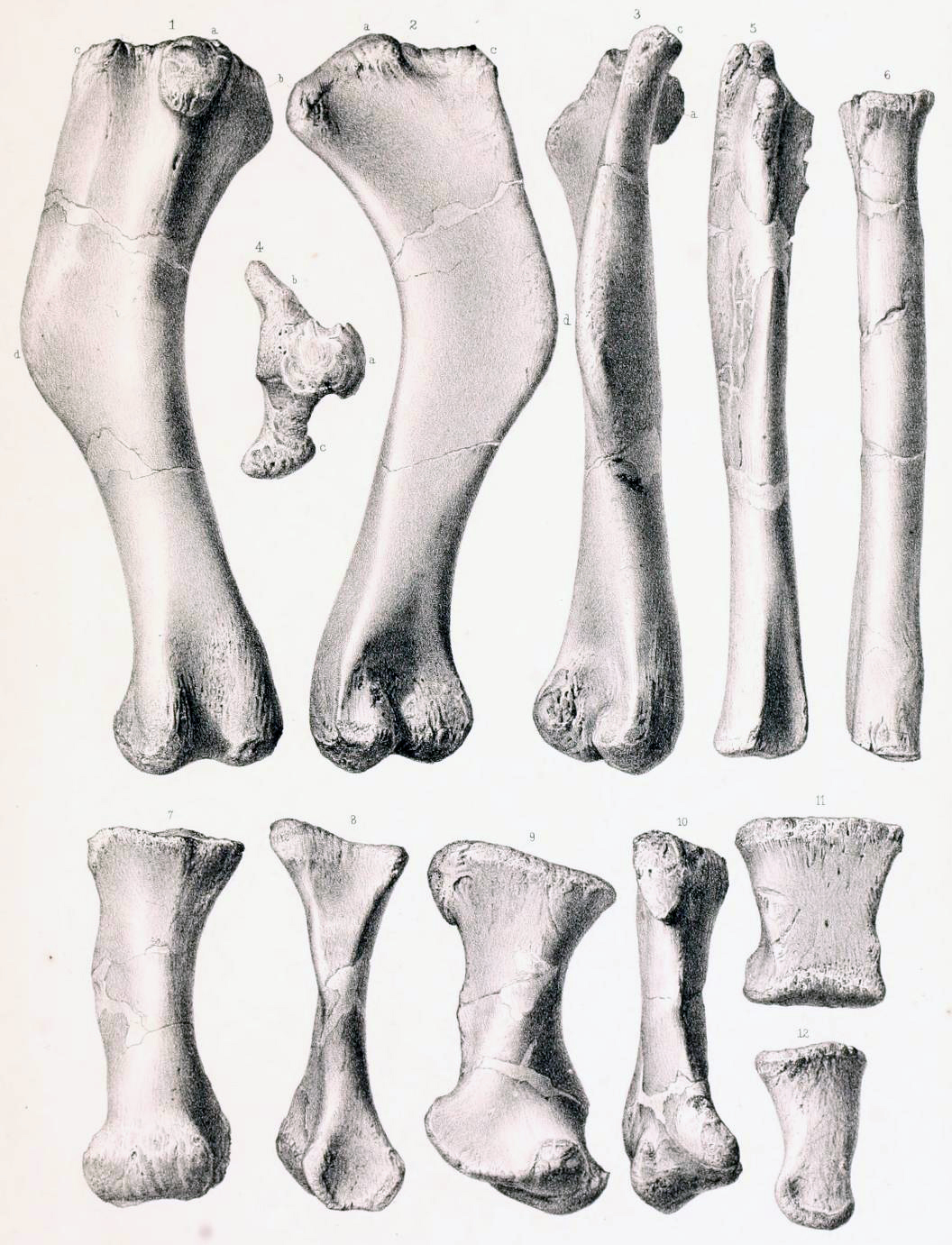
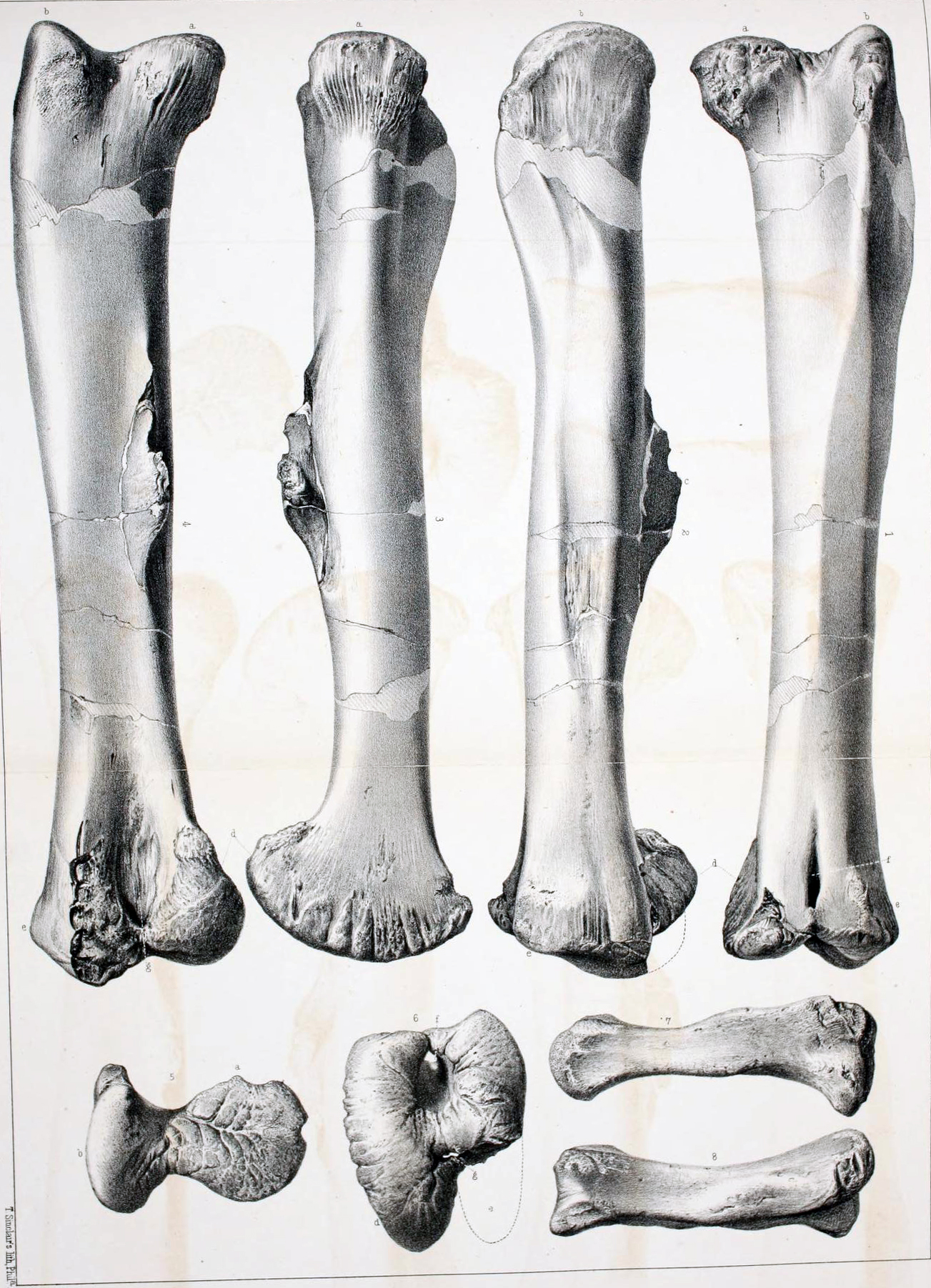
Plates showing fore and hindlimb bones

Despite the fact that the family Hadrosauridae has Hadrosaurus as its type genus, the skeleton lacks a skull and was long viewed as too incomplete to compare to other hadrosaurs for classification purposes, leading most scientists to consider it a nomen dubium, or dubious name. However, a re-evaluation of the fossil material in 2011 noted several distinct characteristics of the skeleton that could allow the genus Hadrosaurus and species H. foulkii to remain in use as valid taxa.

Hadrosaurus has also traditionally served as the basis for a large subfamily called Hadrosaurinae, which was seen as a group of largely crestless hadrosaurs related to the crested subfamily Lambeosaurinae. However, the changing view of Hadrosaurus classification in relation to other hadrosaurs has led some scientists to rename these subfamilies. In a 2008 study, Hadrosaurus was found to be more primitive than either lambeosaurines or other "hadrosaurines", and not a particularly close relative of classic "hadrosaurines" such as Edmontosaurus and Saurolophus. As a result of this, the name Hadrosaurinae was restricted to Hadrosaurus alone, and the subfamily comprising the traditional "hadrosaurines" was renamed the Saurolophinae.

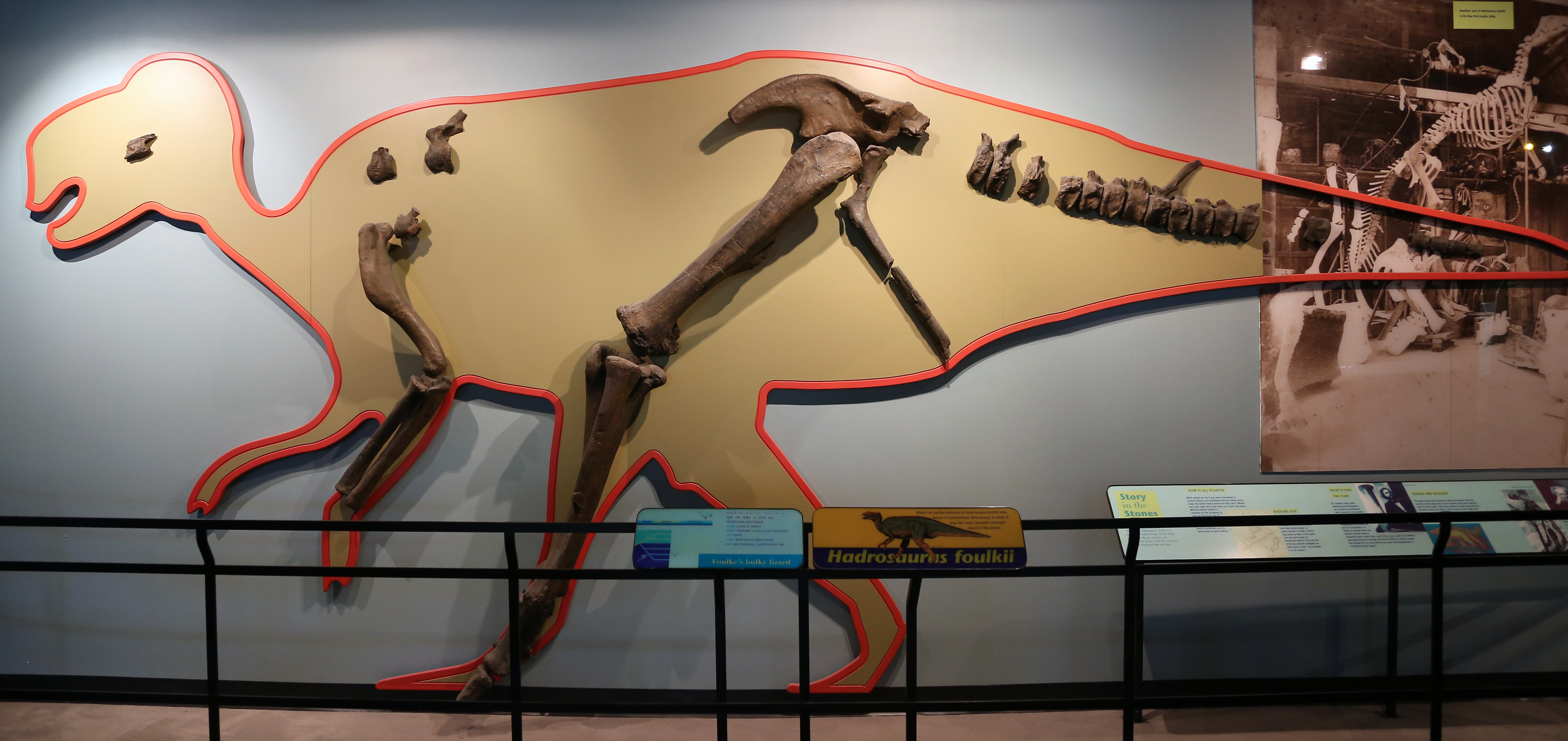
Displayed casts of the 35 known bones at the Philadelphia Academy of Natural Sciences

Mount next to Corythosaurus at the Academy

Below is a simplified cladogram recovered by Ramírez-Velasco et al. in 2012 in their description of Huehuecanauhtlus. This topology was recovered using an extensive sampling of 60 hadrosauroid species, and two outgroup taxa, which were scored based on 287 morphological traits, and included data from two recent redescriptions of Hadrosaurus by Prieto-Márquez et al. (2006) and Prieto-Márquez (2011).

- Hadrosauroidea
  - Jinzhousaurus yangi
  - - Fukuisaurus tetoriensis
    - - Penelopognathus weishampeli
      - - Equijubus normani
        - - Probactrosaurus gobiensis
          - - - Eolambia caroljonesa
              - Protohadros byrdi
            - - Tanius sinensis
              - - - Bactrosaurus johnsoni
                  - Glishades ericksoni
                - - Gilmoreosaurus mongoliensis
                  - - Huehuecanauhtlus tiquichensis
                    - - - Jintasaurus meniscus
                        - Tethyshadros insularis
                      - Hadrosauridae
                        - Hadrosaurinae
                          Hadrosaurus foulkii
                        - - Saurolophinae
                            - - Acristavus gagslarsoni
                              - - Maiasaura peeblesorum
                                - Brachylophosaurus canadensis
                            - - Shantungosaurus giganteus
                              - - - Edmontosaurus annectens
                                  - Edmontosaurus regalis
                                - Derived saurolophines →
                          - Lambeosaurinae
                            - Aralosaurus tuberiferus
                            - - Jaxartosaurus aralensis
                              - - - Tsintaosaurus spinorhinus
                                  - Pararhabdodon isonensis
                                - Derived lambeosaurines →

== Paleobiology ==
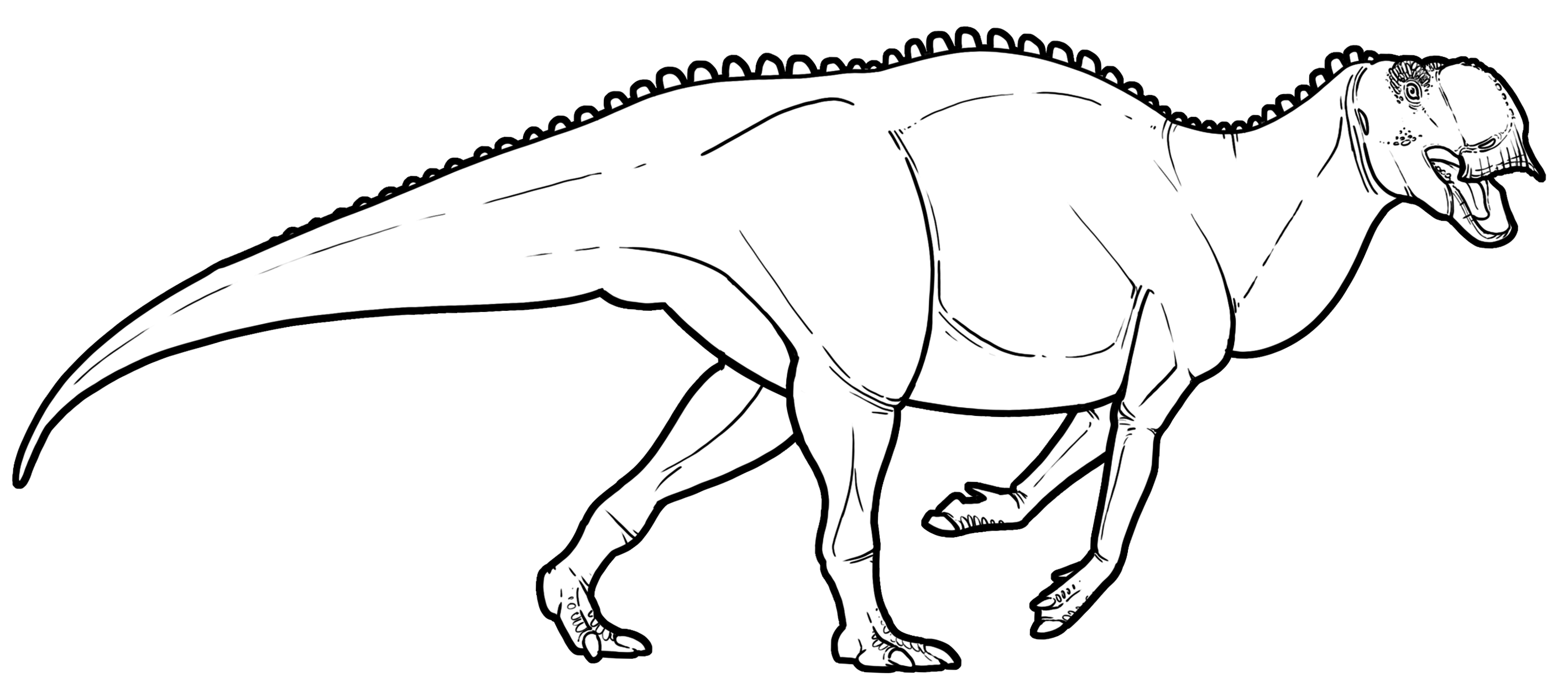
Life restoration

In 2003, Rothschild and colleagues performed a study looking for epidemiology of tumors in dinosaurs. Evidence of tumors, including hemangiomas, desmoplastic fibroma, metastatic cancer and osteoblastoma were discovered in specimens of Hadrosaurus by analyzing dinosaur vertebrae using computerized tomography and fluoroscope screening. Several other hadrosaurids, including Brachylophosaurus, Edmontosaurus and Gilmoreosaurus, also tested positive. Although more than 10,000 fossils were examined in this manner, the tumors were limited to Hadrosaurus and other hadrosaurs. The tumors were only found on caudal vertebrae and they may have been caused by environmental factors or genetic inheritance.

== Paleoecology ==
The holotype of Hadrosaurus was found in marine sediments, which suggests the skeleton was transported by a river and then deposited in the Cretaceous sea. The Hadrosaurus remains all persist to the Woodbury Formation. Through the radiometric dating of bivalve shells known from the formation, the sedimentary rocks where the holotype specimen of Hadrosaurus was found have been dated from 80.5 million to 78.5 million years ago. However, a more accurate date make range from 83.6 to around 77.9 mya.
