= Indian King Tavern =

- U.S. National Register of Historic Places
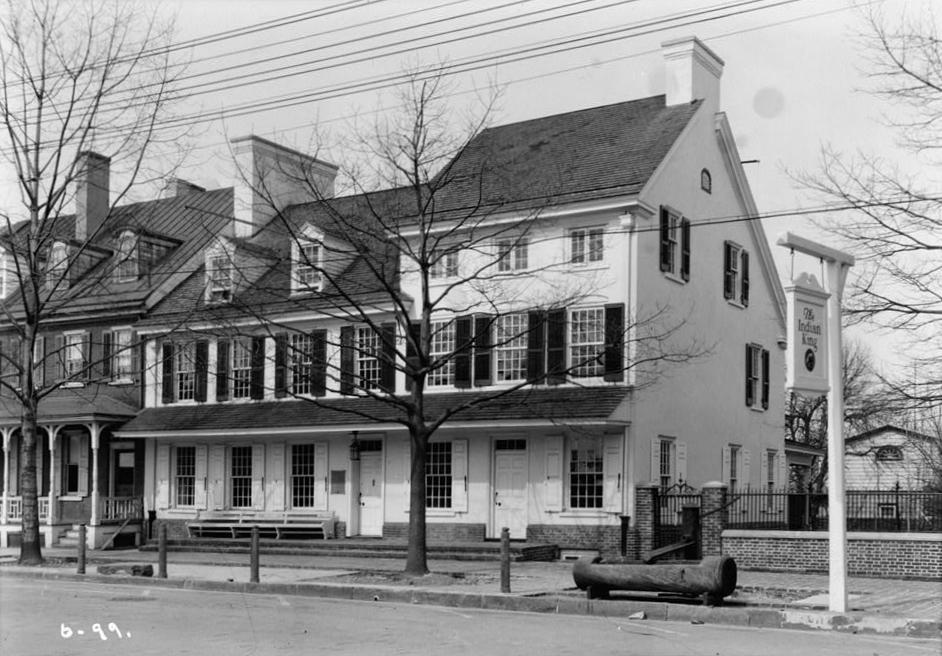

- Location within Camden County, New Jersey Location within New Jersey Location within the United States
- Location: Haddonfield, New Jersey
- Coordinates: 39.8990°N 75.0305°W
- Built: 1750
- NRHP reference No.: 70000382
- Added to NRHP: December 18, 1970

The Indian King Tavern (also known as the Creighton House, or Creighton Tavern) was a colonial American tavern in Haddonfield, Camden County, New Jersey, United States, which was the site of a 1777 meeting of the New Jersey Legislature where the body adopted the State's Great Seal. It was the first State Historic Site, adopted as such in 1903. Its original structure remains largely intact. It is listed on the National Register of Historic Places. (Haddonfield and surrounding areas have been part of Camden County, New Jersey, since the formation of Camden County on March 13, 1844.)

== History ==
In 1745, Mathias Aspden, a Quaker merchant and ship owner, purchased property in the center of the village of Haddonfield, cleared the poorly constructed brewery buildings, and began constructing the largest tavern on the village's main road, Kings Highway. The structure was completed in 1750. The building has been dated earlier with additional research. The oldest portion of the building dates to 1730.

Taverns such as Aspden's were centers of commercial and social life, and in the increasing tensions between the British Empire, represented by Loyalists, and the Patriots, forums for heated debate that put the lives of both those arguing and the owners of such places in jeopardy. As tensions peaked because of the Battles of Lexington and Concord in 1775, the tavern's owner, Mathias Aspden, Jr., had gone to England for his education and returned a staunch Loyalist. He sold his tavern to Thomas Redman, who ran the village apothecary shop. Aspden, Jr. sailed for England for good as the Second Continental Congress was convening in Philadelphia in 1776. He was tried and convicted of treason in absentia; his properties in southwestern New Jersey and southeastern Pennsylvania were seized and sold, with the profits going into the Continental Treasury.

In 1776, New Jersey saw such towns as Princeton and Trenton devastated by marching armies from both sides during the American Revolution. Haddonfield residents gathered frequently at the tavern; Redman, who was also the clerk for the local Friends Meeting, was required to read publicly documents that included the sect's pacifist refusal to become combatants. Because of this, in January 1777 Redman was arrested and charged with sedition by an officer of the Continental Army, and jailed in Woodbury, the county seat at that time. Redman was released and fined on March 18 of that same year. He returned to his tavern in Haddonfield to find that the state had used his tavern that same day to create a Council of Safety, whose mission it was to try, convict and incarcerate deserters, Loyalists and other enemies of the Revolution. The cellar of the tavern is thought to have been used by this council to hold the overflow from the guard house across the street

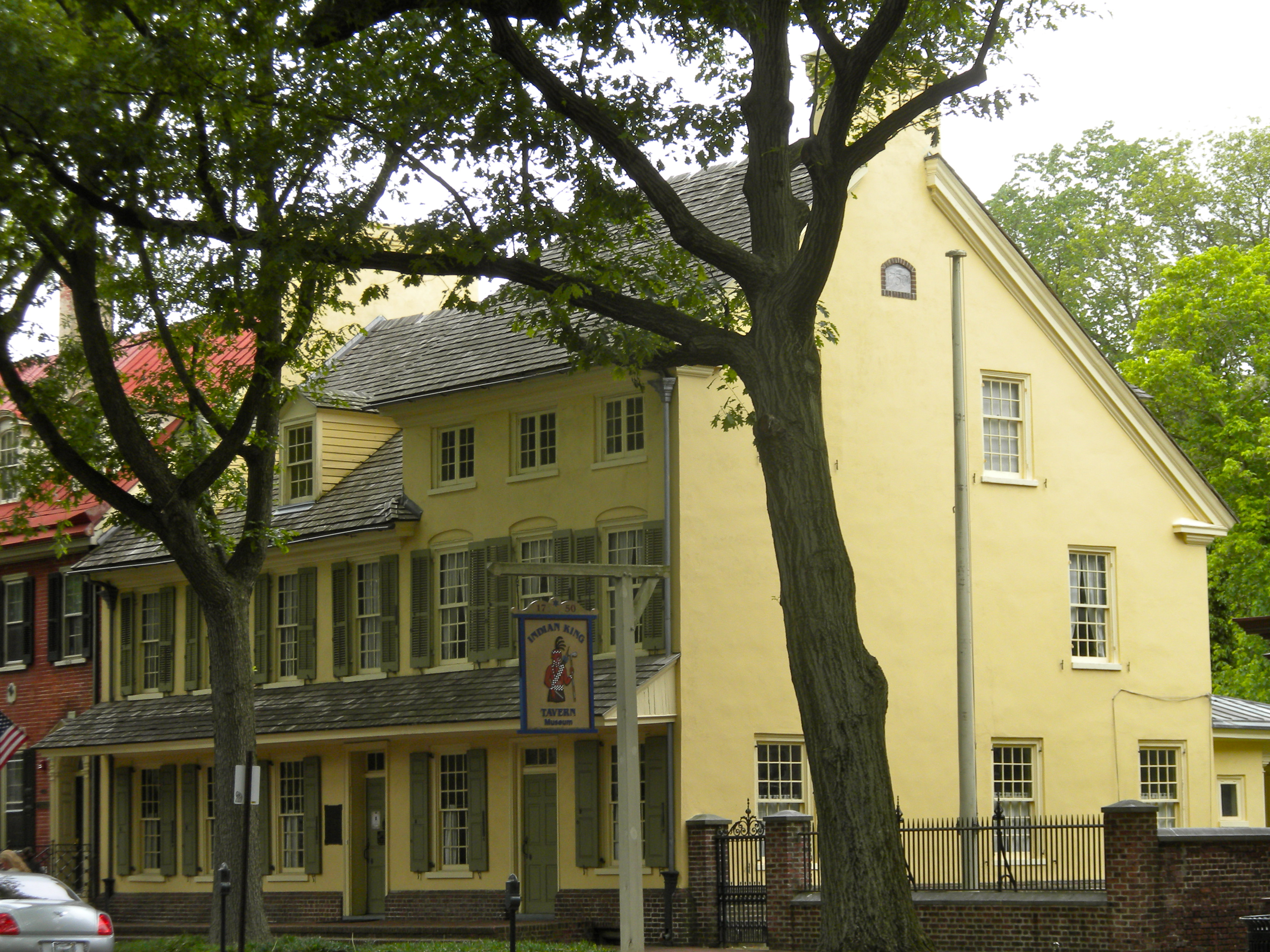
Indian King Tavern in 2010

Less than two months later, Redman sold his tavern to Hugh Creighton, who already owned a tavern a few blocks away near Potter Street. Creighton's old tavern was named the "Indian King" Tavern by its original owner, Sarah Norris, in deference to Lenape Native Americans who had cared for the newly immigrated and poorly equipped European settlers; it was subsequently taken over by Mary French, a widow who later married Creighton. Hugh Creighton then transferred the name of the tavern to his newly acquired tavern on Kings Highway.

The tavern was alternately occupied by British, Hessians and Continental troops as the revolution ravaged parts of the state. Patriot generals Anthony Wayne, the Marquis de Lafayette and the Polish Count Casimir Pulaski all marched along Kings Highway, and the Indian King Tavern, being the largest and most prominent at the time, would have been used by these men for meetings, lodging and recreation. Today, the remains of British and Hessian soldiers who died in Haddonfield remain buried in unmarked graves at the north corner of the cemetery at the Society of Friends' meeting house nearby.

Several local legends about the Indian King Tavern have now been dispelled. When tours were given in the 1960s and 1970s it was said that Dolley Madison frequented the Indian King Tavern attending dances there. Another legend is that the tunnels from the Indian King Tavern under King's Highway were once part of the Underground Railroad.

=== Early statehood ===
On July 2, 1776, the New Jersey government declared itself free and independent via the New Jersey Constitution of 1776. In 1777, the New Jersey Legislature (joint session of the General Assembly and Legislative Council) met on the spacious second floor meeting room of the Indian King Tavern because the area they had been meeting in was overrun by fighting troops. The Council and General Assembly of the colony formally read into the meeting minutes the Declaration of Independence created across the Delaware River in Philadelphia in the previous year and enacted the law that formally accepted its terms. They remained there for some time, conducting the new state's affairs.

== Today ==
In 1903, the state acquired the Indian King Tavern structure, due to its history with the state legislature, removed recent additions, and restored the original layout of two-and-a-half stories. The Indian King Tavern Museum was the first New Jersey Historic Site, and is now administered by the Division of Parks and Forestry of the New Jersey Department of Environmental Protection. Tours are provided free for the first and second floors, but not the cellar, which remains a topic of mystery as to its unusual layout and passageways. While the essential parts of the original structure remain, its interior accessories were created by reproduction craftsmen because of budgetary requirements.

== See also ==
- National Register of Historic Places listings in Camden County, New Jersey
