= Ms. JD =

U.S. nonprofit organization

- Formation: 2006
- Type: 501(c)(3) nonprofit nonpartisan organization
- Purpose: promotes women in the legal profession
- Location: United States

Ms. JD is a 501(c)(3) nonprofit, nonpartisan organization that promotes women in the legal profession and provides an online forum for dialogue and networking among women lawyers and law students in all arenas of the legal profession. Ms. JD was created in 2006, by women law students from 12 law schools from around the United States. Ms. JD's mission is to reinforce and expand the representation of women in law school and the legal profession.

== Purpose ==
Ms. JD disseminates information and fosters dialogue about and for women in the law. In addition, Ms. JD provides summer scholarships to law students working in government or public interest positions, sponsors writing contests that expand the dialogue about key issues affecting women lawyers, and organizes conferences and networking events for women lawyers and law students. Through its online website, Ms. JD explores the work of female attorneys, provides networking opportunities, offers critical analysis of relevant news, and discussions for women about their chosen fields of law. Ms. JD also spotlights women in the law and explores women-friendly practices across a spectrum of legal institutions.

== History ==
Though women comprise approximately half of the student body of American law schools, they represent only 17% of partners at major law firms and less than a quarter of tenured law professors. Similarly, on the national level, we have had only one female U.S. Attorney General, three female Secretaries of State, three women Supreme Court Justices, and one acting Solicitor General. Concerned by the rates at which women opt out of the legal profession, the lack of representation of women in the highest courts and echelons of the legal community, and the role of gender in the progression of many women's legal careers, a group of female law students from UC Berkeley, Cornell, Georgetown, Harvard, NYU, Stanford, UCLA, UT Austin, the University of Chicago, the University of Michigan, the University of Virginia, and Yale Law School came together and created Ms. JD in March 2006 at a two-day conference hosted by Stanford Law School. In 2006, Ms. JD incorporated in the state of California and received 501(c)(3) charitable status from the Internal Revenue Service. On March 31, 2007, Ms. JD publicly launched its website at a national conference co-hosted by Yale Law Women and hosted at Yale Law School. The Women's Law School Coalition (WLSC) merged with Ms. JD in 2007.

== NWLSO ==
In April 2008, Ms. JD launched the National Women Law Students' Organization (NWLSO) in New York City with representatives from more than 70 law schools in 33 states represented. Keynote remarks were provided by Chief Judge Judith Kaye of the New York Court of Appeals; Barbara Babcock, the first female professor at Stanford Law School; and Dahlia Lithwick, senior editor and legal correspondent for Slate.com.

NWLSO connects women law students across the country to identify common goals and share knowledge and support with one another and sponsor networking and informational events across the country. The national network provides women law students with connections and support to achieve equal status in the legal profession.

== Awards ==
Ms. JD was a finalist for Best Law Blog at the 2007 Weblog Awards and has been regularly selected as one of the American Bar Association Journal's Top 100 Blawgs, winning the "Your So-Called Life" category in both 2007, and 2008.
