= Demarest House =

Demarest House may refer to:

in the United States (by state then city)

- Demarest–Atwood House, Cresskill, New Jersey, listed on the National Register of Historic Places (NRHP) in Bergen County
- John R. Demarest House, Demarest, New Jersey, listed on the NRHP in Bergen County
- Samuel R. Demarest House, Demarest, New Jersey, listed on the NRHP in Bergen County
- Daniel Demarest House, Dumont, New Jersey, listed on the NRHP in Bergen County
- Thomas Demarest House, Englewood, New Jersey, listed on the NRHP in Bergen County
- Ackerman–Demarest House, Ho-Ho-Kus, New Jersey, listed on the NRHP in Bergen County
- Blauvelt–Demarest House, Hillsdale, New Jersey, listed on the NRHP in Bergen County
- Davenport–Demarest House, Montville, New Jersey, listed on the NRHP in Morris County
- Demarest House (New Brunswick, New Jersey), listed on the NRHP in Middlesex County
- Jacobus Demarest House (New Milford, New Jersey), listed on the NRHP in Bergen County
- Demarest House (Oakland, New Jersey), listed on the NRHP in Bergen County
- Jacobus Demarest House (Oakland, New Jersey), listed on the NRHP in Bergen County
- Demarest–Bloomer–Hart House, New Milford, New Jersey, listed on the NRHP in Bergen County
- Demarest–Hopper House, Oakland, New Jersey, listed on the NRHP in Bergen County
- Demarest House (Oradell, New Jersey), listed on the NRHP in Bergen County
- Debaun–Demarest House, River Edge, New Jersey, listed on the NRHP in Bergen County
- Demarest House (River Edge, New Jersey), listed on the NRHP in Bergen County
- Haring–Blauvelt–Demarest House, River Vale, New Jersey, listed on the NRHP in Bergen County
- Cornelius Demarest House, Rochelle Park, New Jersey, listed on the NRHP in Bergen County
- Brinkerhoff–Demarest House, Teaneck, New Jersey, listed on the NRHP in Bergen County
- Demarest–Lyle House, Tenafly, New Jersey, listed on the NRHP in Bergen County
