= Demarest =

Demarest may refer to:

== Places ==
United States

- Demarest, New Jersey, borough in Bergen County
  - Demarest (Erie Railroad station), on the National Register of Historic Places
- Demarest Hall, dormitory at Rutgers College

== People ==
- Aaron T. Demarest, (1841 – July 13, 1908), American carriage and automobile body manufacturer
- Arthur Demarest, (fl. late 20th century), anthropologist noted for his work on the Mayans
- Calvin Demarest, (1886–1925), American carom billiards champion
- Clifford Demarest, (August 12, 1874 – May 13, 1946), American composer and pianist
- David Demarest, (born 1951), White House Communications Director under George H.W. Bush
- David P. Demarest, (1931–2011), American academic and writer
- Joseph M. Demarest, associate executive assistant director of the Criminal, Cyber, Response, and Services branch of the FBI
- Ken Demarest, Internet game pioneer and artist
- Lea Demarest Taylor, (June 24, 1883 – December 3, 1975), head resident of the Chicago Commons from 1922 to 1954
- William Demarest, (1892–1983), American actor
- William Henry Steele Demarest, (1863–1956), American academic

== See also ==
- Demarest House (disambiguation), various places on the National Register of Historic Places
- Demorest (disambiguation)
