= Quaker School (Burlington) =

- U.S. National Register of Historic Places
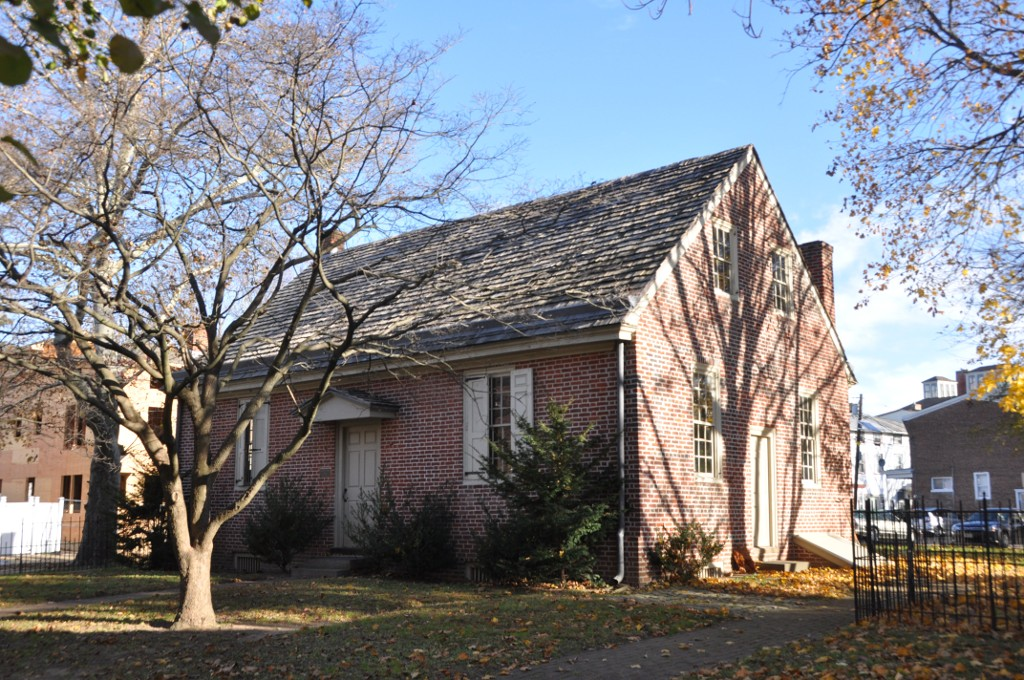

- Location within Burlington County, New Jersey Location within New Jersey Location within the United States
- Location: York and Penn Streets, Burlington, New Jersey
- Coordinates: 40°4′48″N 74°51′22″W
- Area: less than one acre
- Built: 1792
- NRHP reference No.: 74001156
- Added to NRHP: December 31, 1974

Quaker School is a historic Quaker school at York and Penn Streets in Burlington, Burlington County, New Jersey, United States.

It was built in 1792 and added to the National Register of Historic Places in 1974.

== See also ==
- High Street Historic District.
- Burlington Historic District.
- List of the oldest buildings in New Jersey
- National Register of Historic Places listings in Burlington County, New Jersey
- Burlington Towne Centre (River Line station)
