= High Street Historic District (Burlington, New Jersey) =

- U.S. National Register of Historic Places
- U.S. Historic district
- New Jersey Register of Historic Places
- Location within Burlington County, New Jersey Location within New Jersey Location within the United States
- Location: Roughly High Street from Pearl Street to Federal Street; 6 West Pearl Street; Burlington, New Jersey
- Coordinates: 40.0772°N 74.8586°W
- Architect: William Strickland; Richard Upjohn
- Architectural style: Gothic, Gothic Revival
- NRHP reference No.: 93001386; 14000515
- NJRHP No.: 761; 5171

Significant dates
- Added to NRHP: December 15, 1993; August 25, 2014 boundary increase
- Designated NJRHP: October 25, 1993; June 10, 2014 boundary increase

The High Street Historic District in Burlington, New Jersey, is a historic district listed on state and federal registers of historic places. It is adjacent to the city's Burlington Historic District. The district, which is a certified local district, comprises the buildings at 201–467 and 200–454 High Street and 13–37 and 10–22 East Broad. The boundary increase of 2014 includes the building at 6 West Pearl Street, a brewery building dating from 1682, now a residence.

== See also ==
- List of the oldest buildings in New Jersey
- National Register of Historic Places listings in Burlington County, New Jersey
- Quaker School (Burlington)
- Burlington Towne Centre (River Line station)
