= Quaker school =

Quaker school may refer to:

- List of Friends schools, a school which provides an education based on the beliefs and testimonies of the Religious Society of Friends (Quakers)
- Quaker School (Burlington), one such establishment in Burlington, New Jersey and on the National Register of Historic Places
- Quaker Education, a website hosted by the Friends' Schools' Council in the UK and Ireland
