= Burlington Historic District (Burlington, New Jersey) =

- U.S. National Register of Historic Places
- U.S. Historic district
- New Jersey Register of Historic Places
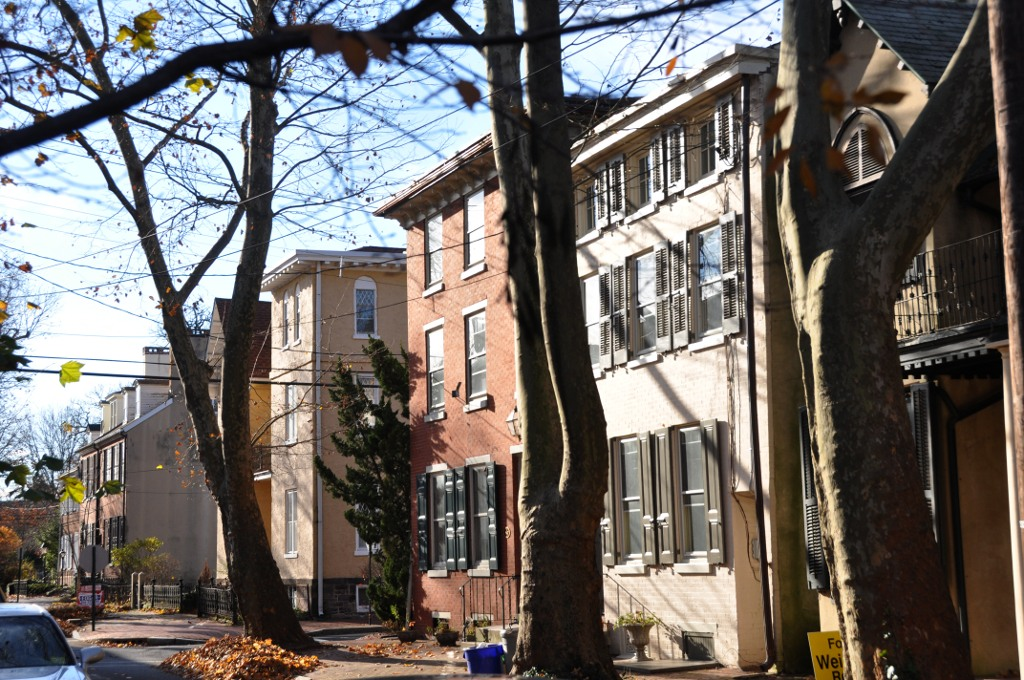

- Location within Burlington County, New Jersey Location within New Jersey Location within the United States
- Location: Roughly L-shaped, bounded by Delaware River and High, W. Broad, Albot, and Reed Sts., Burlington, New Jersey
- Coordinates: 40°4′43″N 74°51′50″W
- Area: 31 acres (13 ha)
- Architect: William Strickland; Richard Upjohn
- Architectural style: Gothic, Gothic Revival
- NRHP reference No.: 75001124
- NJRHP No.: 758

Significant dates
- Added to NRHP: March 13, 1975
- Designated NJRHP: July 1, 1974

The Burlington Historic District in Burlington, New Jersey, United States, is a historic district bounded by the Delaware River and High, West Broad, Talbot, and Reed streets; it is listed on state and federal registers of historic places. The oldest building in Burlington County and one of the oldest residences in New Jersey, the Revell House, is a contributing property. St. Mary's Episcopal Church, built in 1703 and the oldest church in New Jersey, is also within the district; the new St. Mary's, designed by Richard Upjohn and completed in 1854, has separate status as a National Historic Landmark. This district is adjacent to the city's High Street Historic District.

== See also ==
- List of the oldest buildings in New Jersey
- National Register of Historic Places listings in Burlington County, New Jersey
- Burlington Towne Centre (River Line station)
