= Caspar Westervelt House =

- U.S. National Register of Historic Places
- New Jersey Register of Historic Places
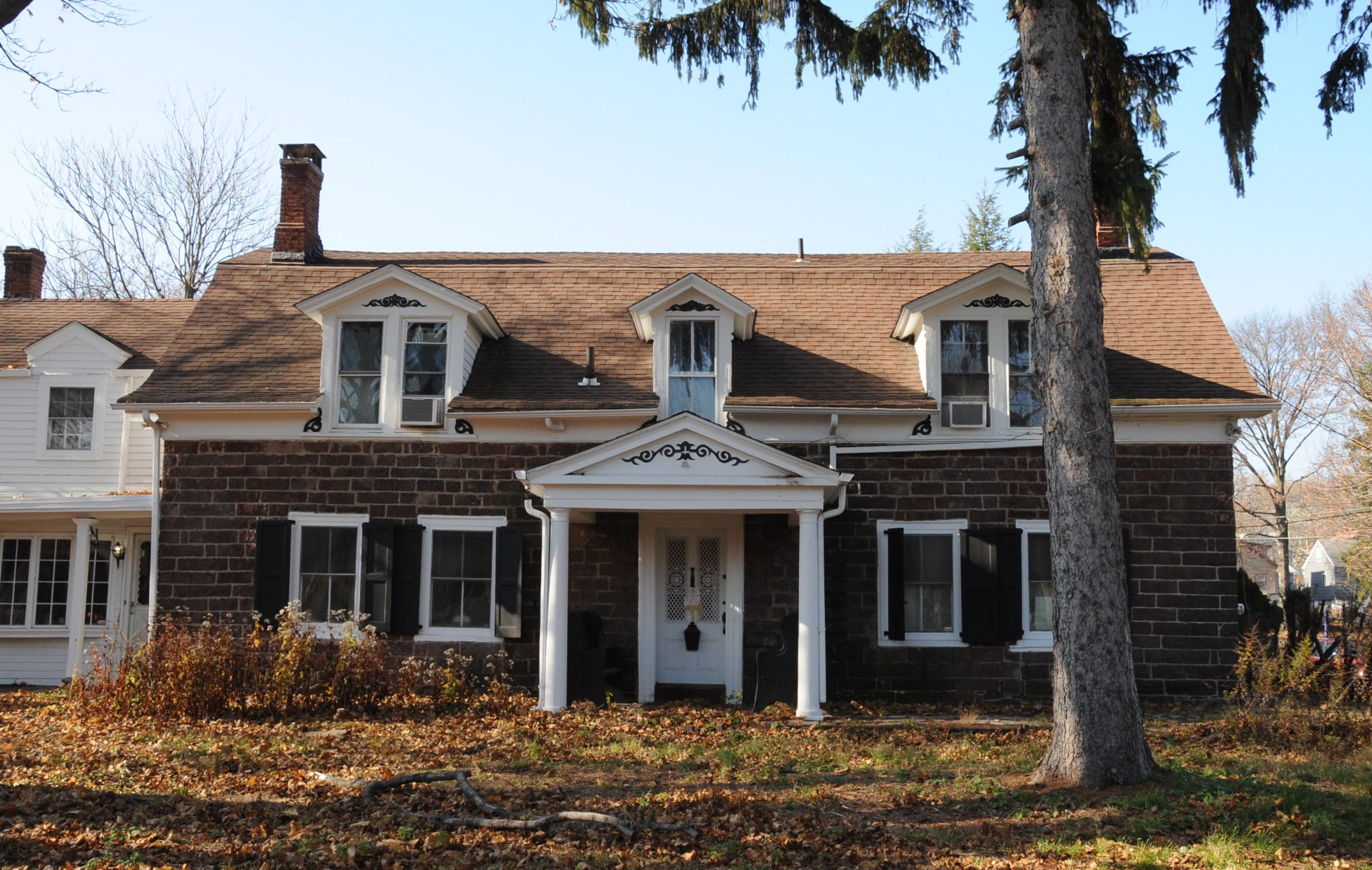
- The Caspar Westervelt House in 2015

- Location within Bergen County, New Jersey Location within New Jersey Location within the United States
- Location: 20 Sherwood Road, Teaneck, New Jersey
- Coordinates: 40°52′9″N 74°0′54″W
- Area: less than one acre
- Built: 1763
- MPS: Stone Houses of Bergen County TR
- NRHP reference No.: 83001584
- NJRHP No.: 701

Significant dates
- Added to NRHP: January 10, 1983
- Designated NJRHP: October 3, 1980

The Caspar Westervelt House is located in Teaneck, Bergen County, New Jersey, United States. The house was built in 1763 and was added to the National Register of Historic Places on January 10, 1983.

== See also ==
- National Register of Historic Places listings in Bergen County, New Jersey
- List of the oldest buildings in New Jersey
