= Revell House =

Historic house In New Jersey, United States

- U.S. Historic district – Contributing property
- New Jersey Register of Historic Places
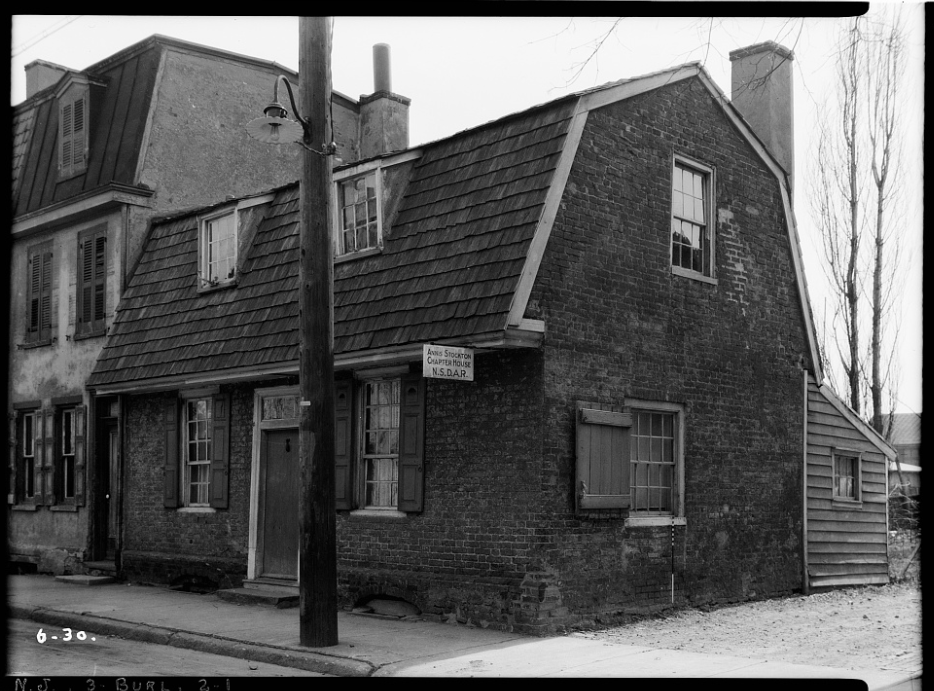

- Location within Burlington County, New Jersey Location within New Jersey Location within the United States
- Coordinates: 40.07954°N 74.86140°W
- NRHP reference No.: Burlington Historic District; 78001124
- NJRHP No.: 758

Significant dates
- Added to NRHP: March 13, 1975
- Designated NJRHP: July 1, 1974

Revell House, also known as the Hutchinson-Revell House, in Burlington, New Jersey, is the oldest building in Burlington County and one of the oldest residences in New Jersey. It was constructed in 1685 by George Hutchinson, a wealthy Quaker distiller, and sold to Thomas Revell who used it as offices from 1696 to 1699. Originally located at 8 East Pearl Street, the building was relocated to 213 Wood Street in 1966.

According to tradition, Benjamin Franklin was sold gingerbread and given supper by a friendly Burlington woman on his way to Philadelphia. This led for the house to sometimes be referred as the Gingerbread House. It is a contributing property of the Burlington Historic District bounded by the Delaware River and High, West Broad, Talbot, and Reed Streets listed March 3, 1975.

== See also ==
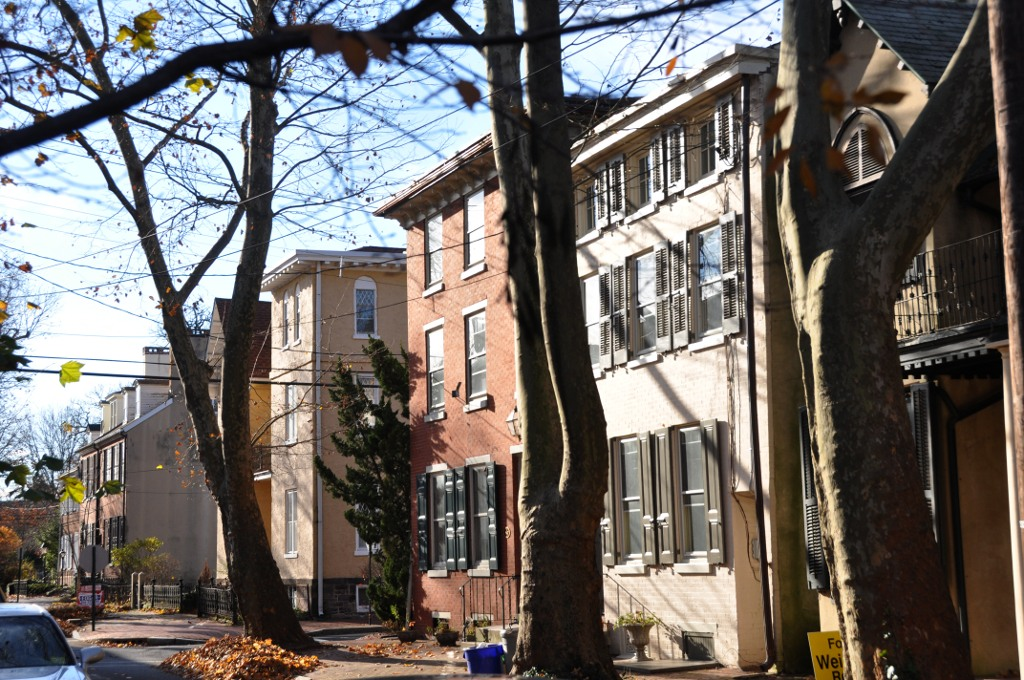
Wood Street in Burlington Historic District

- List of the oldest buildings in New Jersey
- National Register of Historic Places listings in Burlington County, New Jersey
