= Johannes Parlaman House =

- U.S. National Register of Historic Places
- New Jersey Register of Historic Places
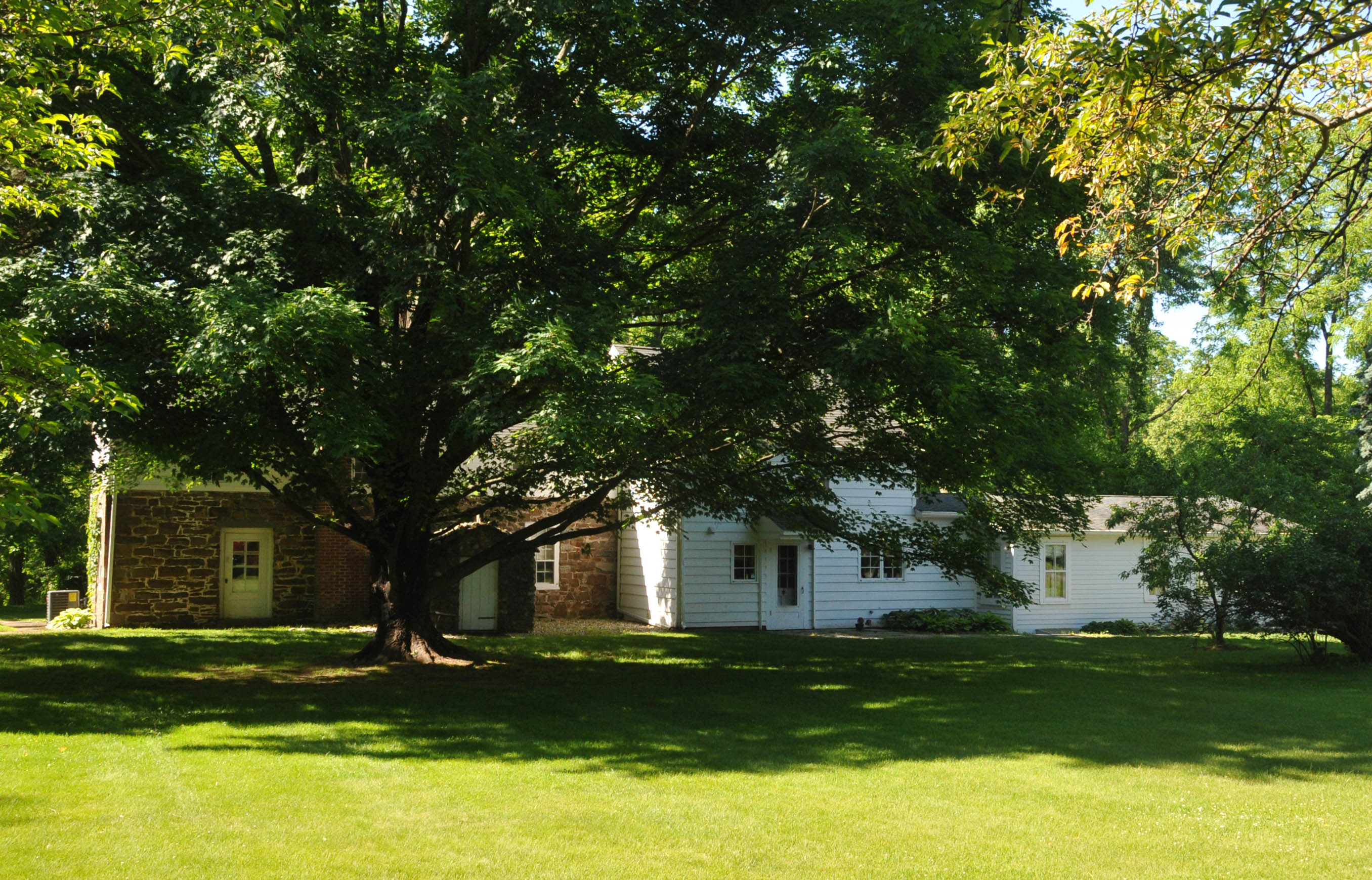

- Location within Morris County, New Jersey Location within New Jersey Location within the United States
- Location: 15 Vreeland Avenue; Montville, New Jersey
- Coordinates: 40°54′03″N 74°22′50″W
- Area: 2.2 acres (0.89 ha)
- Built: c. 1755
- Architectural style: Colonial, Dutch Colonial
- MPS: Dutch Stone Houses in Montville MPS
- NRHP reference No.: 91001933
- NJRHP No.: 2160

Significant dates
- Added to NRHP: January 17, 1992
- Designated NJRHP: November 25, 1991

The Johannes Parlaman House is a historic stone house overlooking the Rockaway River at 15 Vreeland Avenue in the township of Montville in Morris County, New Jersey, United States. The oldest section was built around 1755. It was documented by the Historic American Buildings Survey in 1938. The house was added to the National Register of Historic Places on January 17, 1992, for its significance in architecture. It was listed as part of the Dutch Stone Houses in Montville Multiple Property Submission (MPS).

== History and description ==
The Dutch Colonial house was built around 1755 when Johannes Parlaman married Marytie Hyler. His mother, Barber Parlaman, had purchased the land in 1736–1737. His son, John Parlaman, inherited the house in 1805. After his death in 1829, the house was left to James Doremus.

The house was extended around 1790, and later around 1840 with a two-story frame wing.

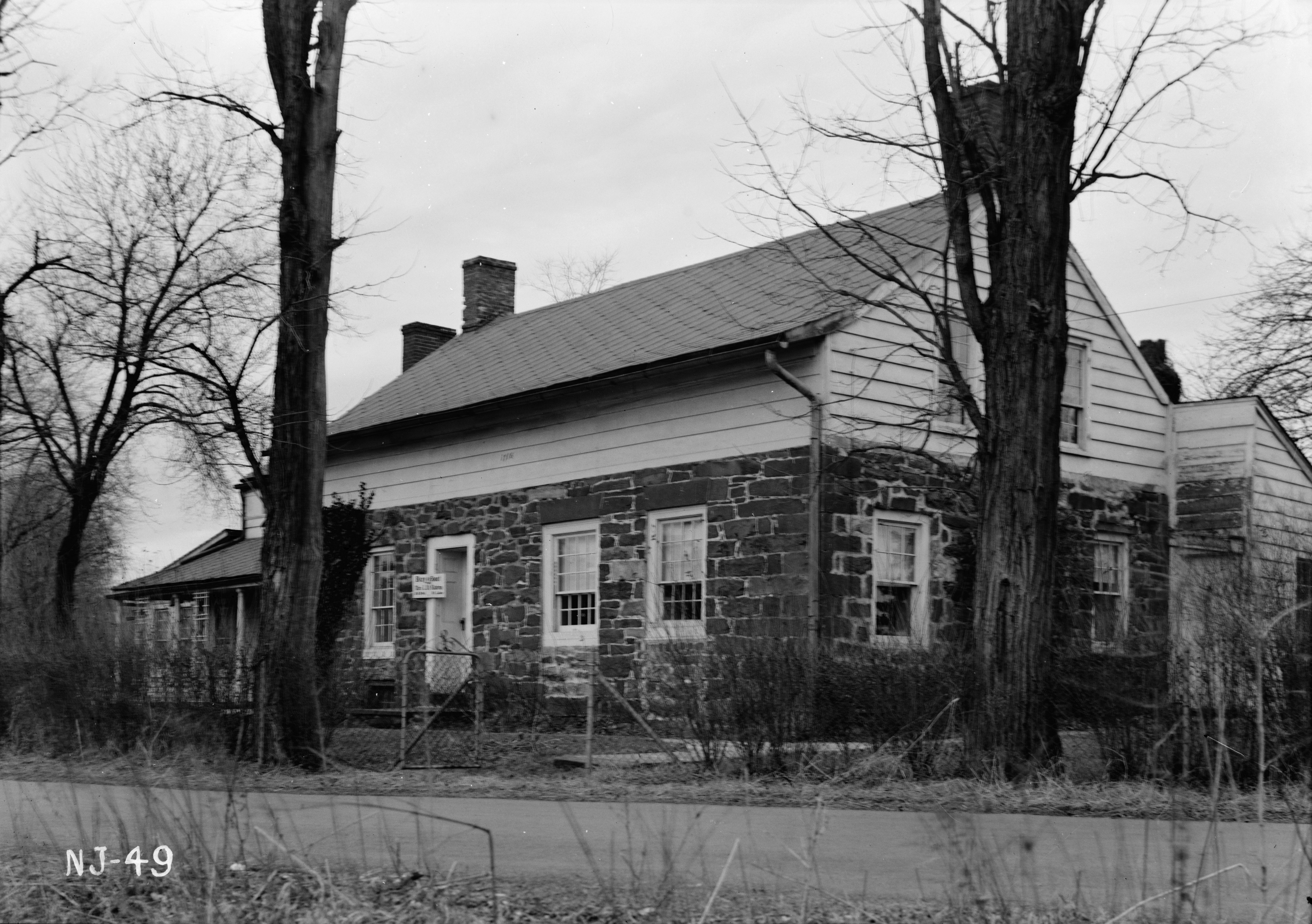
HABS photo from 1938

== See also ==
- National Register of Historic Places listings in Morris County, New Jersey
- List of the oldest buildings in New Jersey
