= Demorest =

Demorest may refer to:

== Places ==
United States

- Demorest, Georgia — city in Habersham County

== People ==
- Ellen Louise Demorest (née Curtis) (1825-1898) — US fashion arbiter and milliner, wife of William Jennings Demorest
- Stephen Demorest — soap opera writer
- William Jennings Demorest (1822-1895) — political leader (Prohibition Party) and magazine publisher from New York City

== See also ==
- Demarest (disambiguation)
