= Sydenham House, Essex County =

Historic house in New Jersey, United States

- Sydenham House
- U.S. National Register of Historic Places
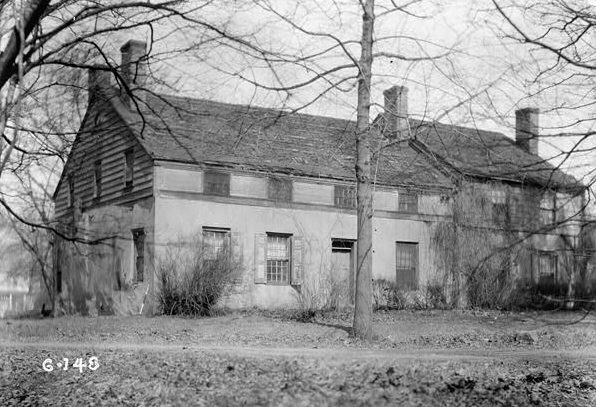

- Location within Essex County, New Jersey Location within New Jersey Location within the United States
- Location: Old Road to Bloomfield (1st Street), south of Heller Parkway, Newark, New Jersey
- Coordinates: 40°46′37″N 74°10′20″W
- Area: 0 acres (0 ha)
- Built: 1711
- NRHP reference No.: 70000384
- Added to NRHP: July 29, 1970

Sydenham House is a historic house on Old Road to Bloomfield, south of Heller Parkway in Newark, Essex County, New Jersey, United States.

Construction took place around 1711. It was added to the National Register of Historic Places in 1970.

== See also ==
- National Register of Historic Places listings in Essex County, New Jersey
- List of the oldest buildings in New Jersey

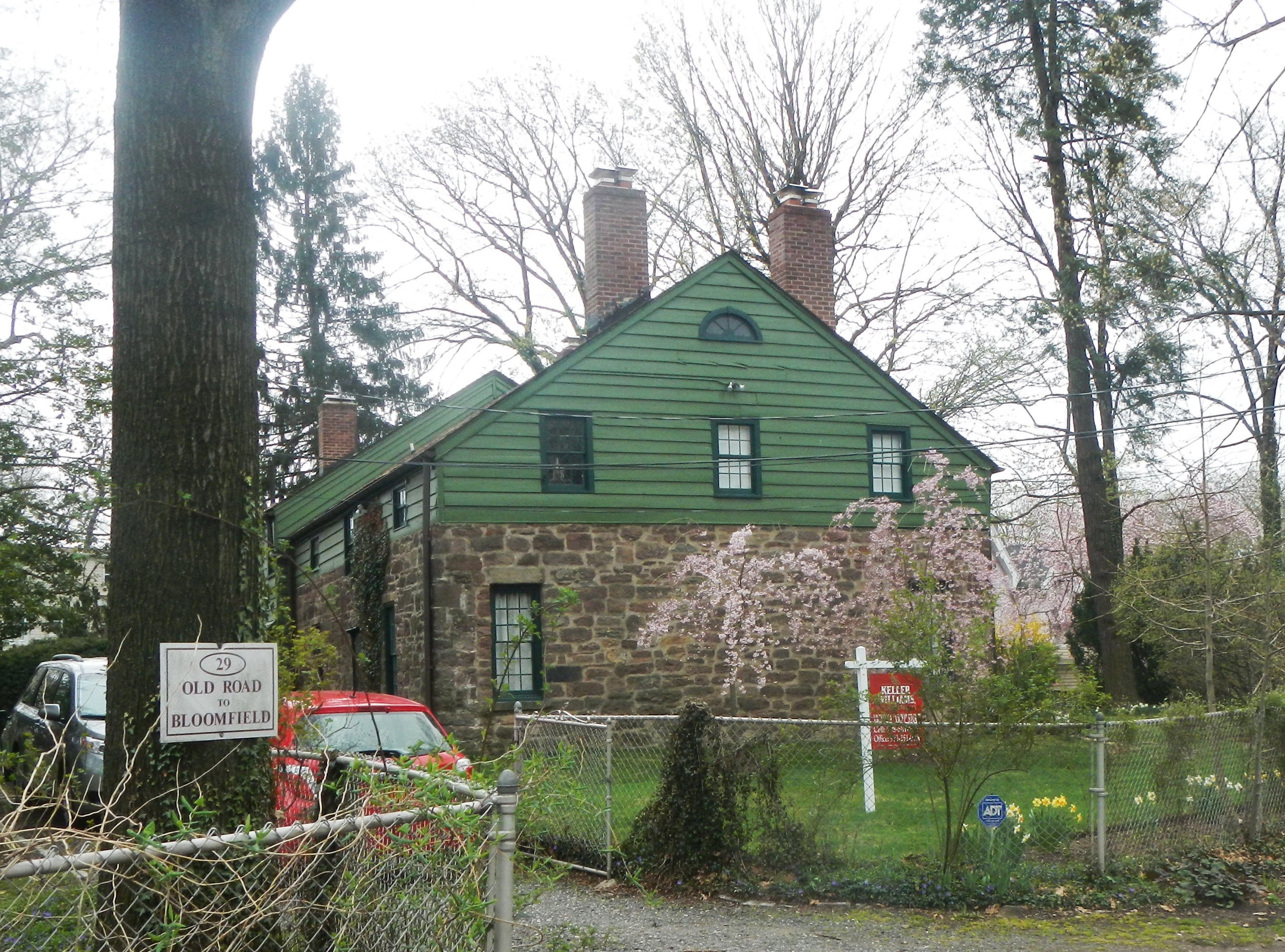
2013
