= Stratford Quaker Store =

Oldest building in Stratford, New Jersey

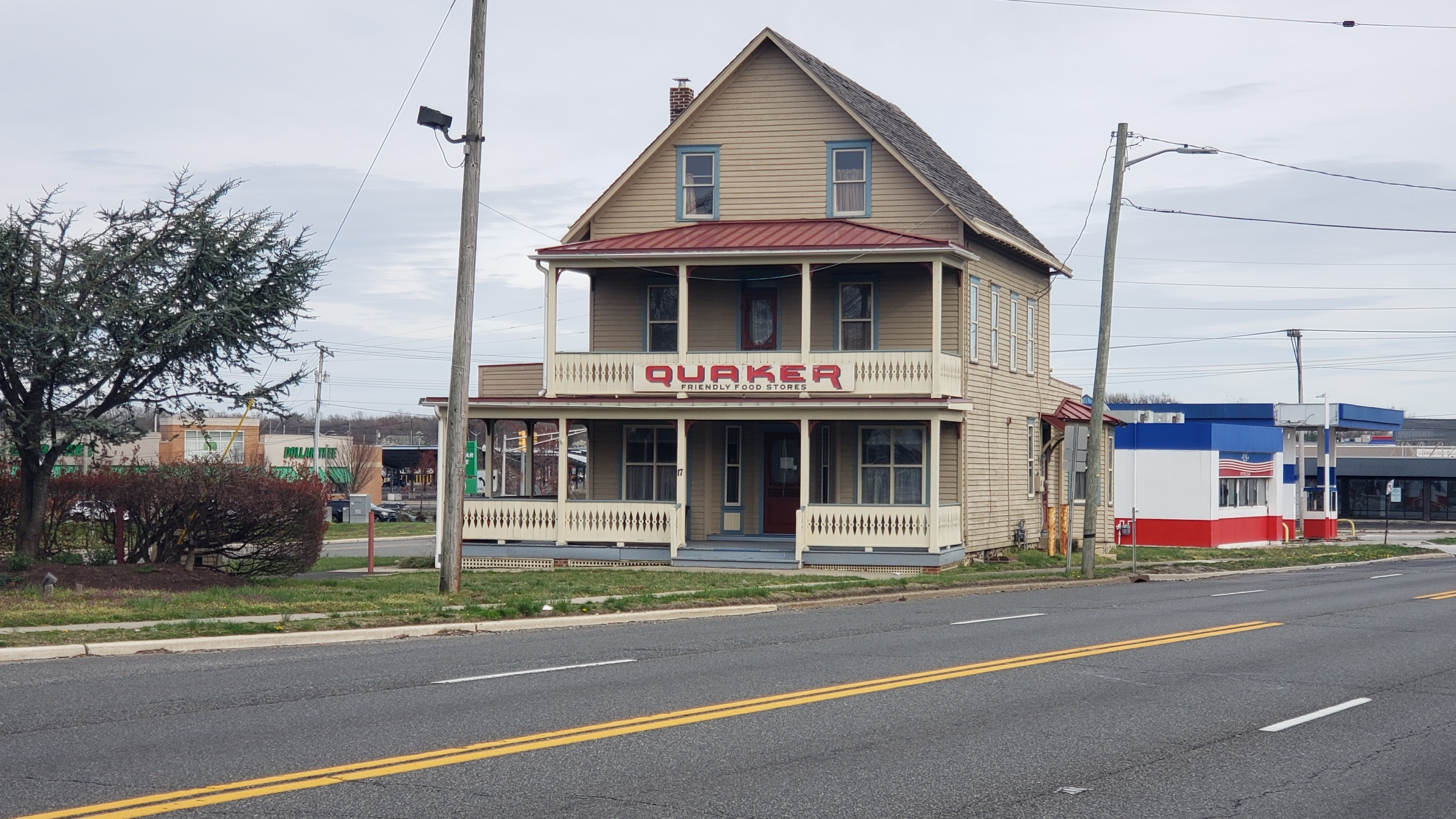

- Location within Camden County, New Jersey Location within New Jersey Location within the United States
- 39°50′04.5″N 75°0′22.1″W
- Type: Historic house
- Location: 17 N White Horse Pike, Stratford, New Jersey

Site notes
- Area: 0.05 acres (0.020 ha)

New Jersey Register of Historic Places
- Designated: Identified September 24, 1996 (not assessed)

The Stratford Quaker Store is a historic home and business that is the oldest standing residence in Stratford, New Jersey, United States, and the only surviving structure of what was once the village of White Horse.

== Background ==
A general store has been present at this intersection as early as the 1740s. The original structure was eventually demolished and its wood repurposed to construct an addition to the neighboring White Horse Tavern, for which the village of White Horse was named (as well as the road, White Horse Pike).

By 1845, the present building is believed to have been erected on the same foundation as the 1743 store. Oral history suggests the establishment was known as "Scroggey's Little Red Store" in the late 19th century, before operating as a restaurant called "George's Place" from 1910 to 1925.

In 1937, Elizabeth Strippoli purchased the building and began operating a general store again, living on the second floor until her death in 1997. Throughout the late 20th century, it was called the "General Store" or "Strippoli's." The present name arose after the Strippolis joined a grocery cooperative, which required the placement of a "Quaker" sign for the sale of Quaker Oats.

In the 1960s, the lot was split and a gas station installed behind the store.

== Preservation ==
In 1996, the building was identified as potentially eligible for the National Register of Historic Place (NRHP) and the New Jersey Register of Historic Places (NJR). Following Mrs. Strippoli's death in 1997, Exxon attempted to demolish the building but was blocked by the town. In 2000, Stratford Borough obtained a grant to renovate and restore the old store, which continued for several years.

In 2004, a county-level historic architectural survey determined the building was not eligible under Criteria A-C of the NRHP; however, its archaeological significance (Criteria D) was not assessed. The same architectural survey listed the Ephraim and Sarah Tomlinson House (also in Stratford) as ineligible, but it was reassessed in 2019 and listed on the NRHP/NJR. Additionally, the survey was conducted before the building was fully restored. Following the restoration, and with so few historic buildings left in Stratford, the Quaker Store has since become a rallying point for the community. The NJHPO database continues to list the property as "not assessed."

Since restoration, however, the building has remained vacant and seen little further development. In 2023, the Strippoli family put it up for sale, and both lots were sold to a developer.

== Related ==
- List of the oldest buildings in New Jersey
- National Register of Historic Places listings in Camden County, New Jersey
