= Gordon M. Snow =

American government official

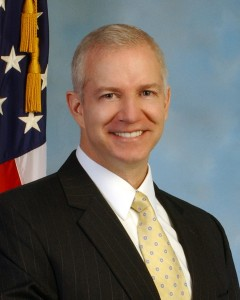
Gordon M. Snow

Gordon M. Snow is a former assistant director of the FBI over the Cyber Division through 2012, the FBI Director of Counterintelligence for the Middle East in 2001, and currently directs Global Security Operations for Cleveland Clinic.

== FBI Assistant Director ==
Gordon M Snow was the assistant director of the Federal Bureau of Investigation in charge of the Cyber Division until his retirement in 2012. Prior to becoming assistant director of the FBI, Snow served as the deputy assistant director of the Cyber Division, the number two official in that division.

Snow entered on duty as a Special Agent with the FBI on March 8, 1992. Upon completion of training at the FBI Academy in Quantico, Virginia, he was assigned to the Birmingham Division's Huntsville Resident Agency. While there, he investigated violent crime, drug, civil rights, public corruption, and white-collar crime matters.

In April 1996, he was assigned to the Critical Incident Response Group as an operator in the FBI Hostage Rescue Team. During that time, he took part in several sensitive rendition missions, conducted terrorism assessments overseas with the Department of State, and was assigned to assessment, protection, and investigative support missions after the bombing of the USS Cole in Aden, Yemen, and the embassy bombings in Nairobi, Kenya. Snow was promoted to supervisory special agent in the Counterintelligence Division's Middle East Unit in January 2001. Two years later, in January 2003, he was assigned to the Detroit Division, where he supervised the foreign counterintelligence program and served as the SWAT program coordinator. In April 2005, Snow was appointed chief of the Weapons of Mass Destruction and Acquisition of U.S. Nuclear & Missile Technology Unit at FBI Headquarters In May 2006, Snow was selected as the assistant special agent in charge of the San Francisco Division's San Jose Resident Agency. In that role, he had operational responsibility for the counter-terrorism, cyber, white-collar crime, and violent crime squads; the San Jose members of the Joint Terrorism Task Force; the High-Value Computer Crimes Task Force; the Silicon Valley Regional Computer Forensics Lab; and the Monterey Bay Resident Agency. He also served as the SWAT program manager.

Snow was assigned to the Afghanistan theater of operations as the FBI's on-scene commander for the Counterterrorism Division in June 2007. Following his return to the U.S., he was appointed section chief in the Cyber Division in January 2008, and detailed to the Office of the Director of National Intelligence, National Counterintelligence Executive. During that assignment, he and his staff led the effort in drafting the government-wide Cyber Counterintelligence Plan under Homeland Security Presidential Directive-23/National Security Presidential Directive-54, the Comprehensive National Cyber Initiative In January 2009. Mr. Snow was then appointed as Chief of the FBI Cyber Division's Cyber National Security Section and was dual-hatted as the Director of the National Cyber Investigative Joint Task Force (NCIJTF). In November 2009, he was named deputy assistant director of the Cyber Division, and later, was named assistant director.

Snow is a native of Detroit, Michigan. He graduated from the University of Michigan with a B.A. in English. He received an M.B.A. with an emphasis in finance from Virginia Tech in 2001 and a J.D. from The Catholic University of America's Columbus School of Law in 2006. Prior to joining the FBI, Snow served in the United States Marine Corps for more than 10 years, as both an enlisted Marine and as an officer.

== Displacement ==
After May 4, 2012, Gordon M. Snow was replaced by Michael S. Welch and then Joseph M. Demarest with limited formal announcement.

== Cleveland Clinic ==
As of May 14, 2012, Gordon M. Snow is the director of physical security operations for Cleveland Clinic, including the 2013 facility in Abu Dhabi.

"It is a privilege to join the Cleveland Clinic team, and a distinct honor to work with the men and women that are committed to providing a safe and secure environment for visitors and caregivers," Snow said. "The exceptional services provided by all departments of the Protective Services Division are designed to enhance the 'patients first' experience, and to support the delivery of world-class healthcare throughout the Cleveland Clinic system."
