= Jacobus Demarest House (New Milford, New Jersey) =

Historic house in New Jersey, United States

- U.S. National Register of Historic Places
- New Jersey Register of Historic Places
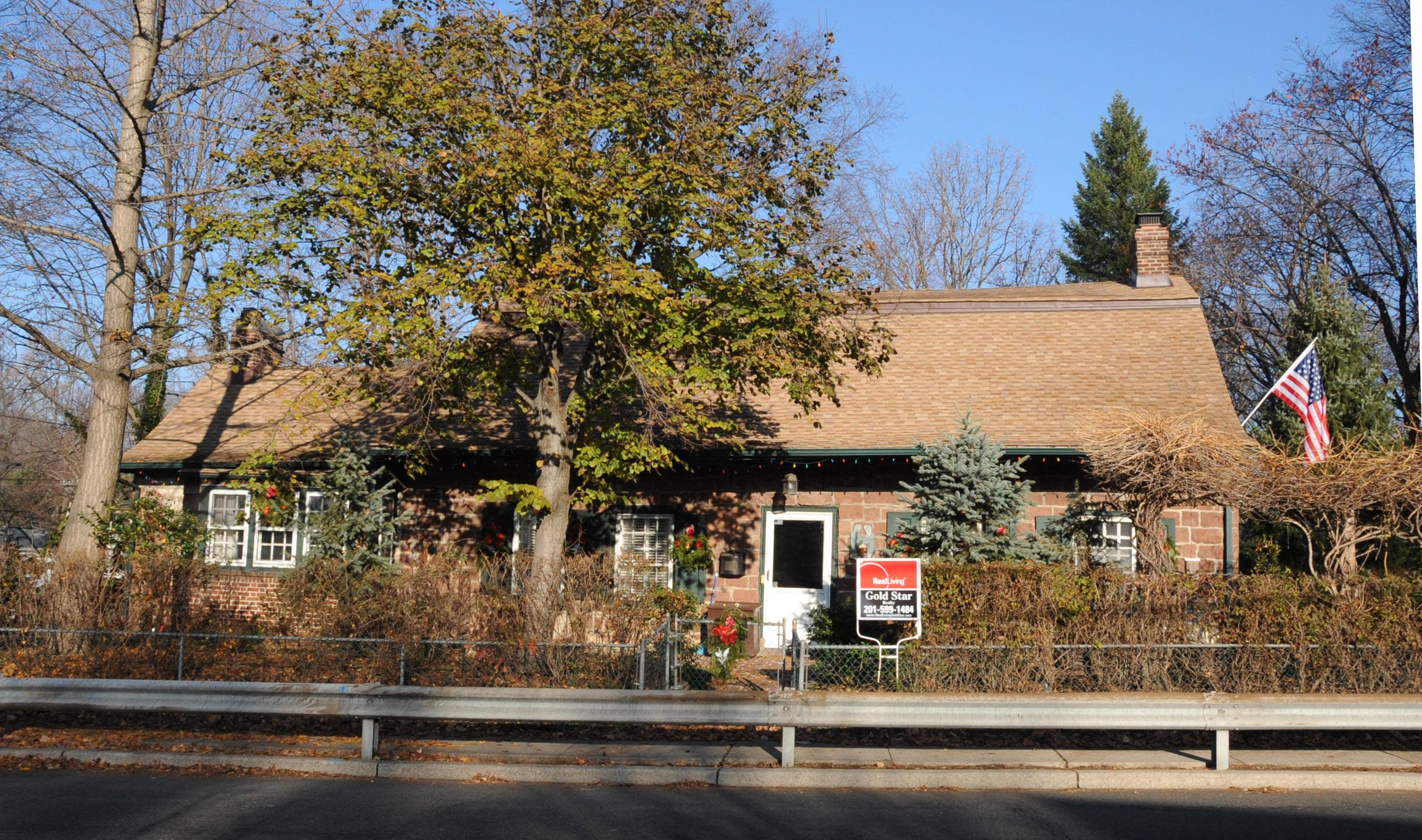
- Jacobus Demarest House in 2015

- Location within Bergen County, New Jersey Location within New Jersey Location within the United States
- Location: 618 River Road, New Milford, New Jersey
- Coordinates: 40°56′4″N 74°1′32″W
- Built: 1765
- Architectural style: Colonial, Dutch Colonial
- NRHP reference No.: 78001739
- NJRHP No.: 584

Significant dates
- Added to NRHP: February 17, 1978
- Designated NJRHP: August 26, 1977

The Jacobus Demarest House, also known as the Demarest–Gurd–Casey House, is located at 618 River Road in the borough of New Milford in Bergen County, New Jersey, United States. The historic stone house was built by 1765. It was documented by the Historic American Buildings Survey (HABS) in 1936. Listed as the Jacobus DesMarest House, it was added to the National Register of Historic Places on February 17, 1978, for its significance in architecture.

== History and description ==
According to the nomination form, the house has several sections. The date of construction of the oldest section remains unknown. It is a 1 and 1/2 story kitchen wing, constructed using red sandstone, expanded with red brick. It may have been built in the 1680s. Attached to the kitchen is a 1 and 1/2 story section with a gambrel roof. Jacobus Demarest may have built these two sections after his second marriage in 1720. The house was expanded by John Demarest in 1765, as documented by a datestone. It was expanded again around 1920. Jacobus Demarest (1681–1763) was the grandson of David des Marest, an early French settler in the county.

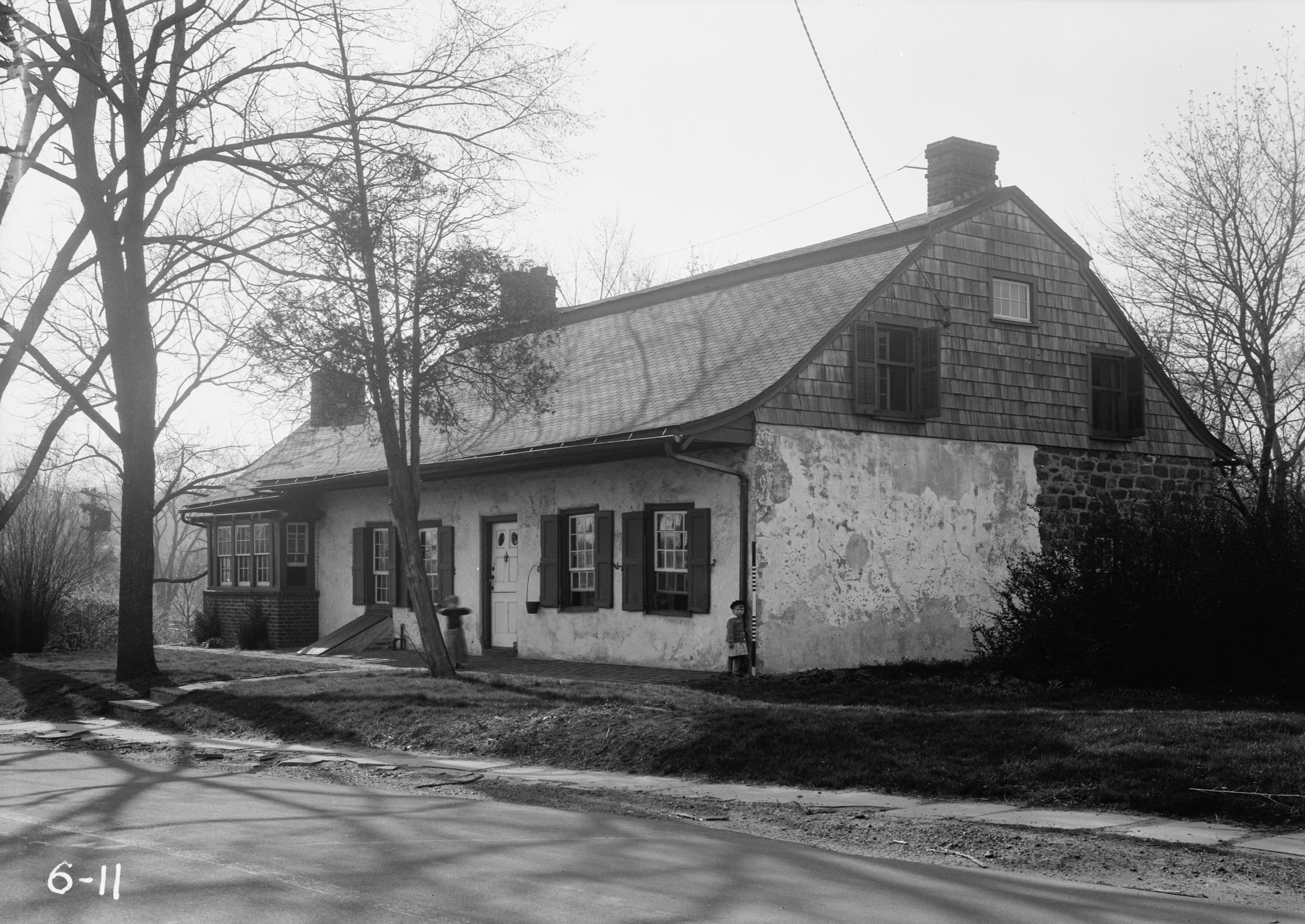
HABS image from 1936

== See also ==
- National Register of Historic Places listings in Bergen County, New Jersey
- List of the oldest buildings in New Jersey
