= Debaun–Demarest House =

Historic house in New Jersey, United States

- U.S. National Register of Historic Places
- New Jersey Register of Historic Places
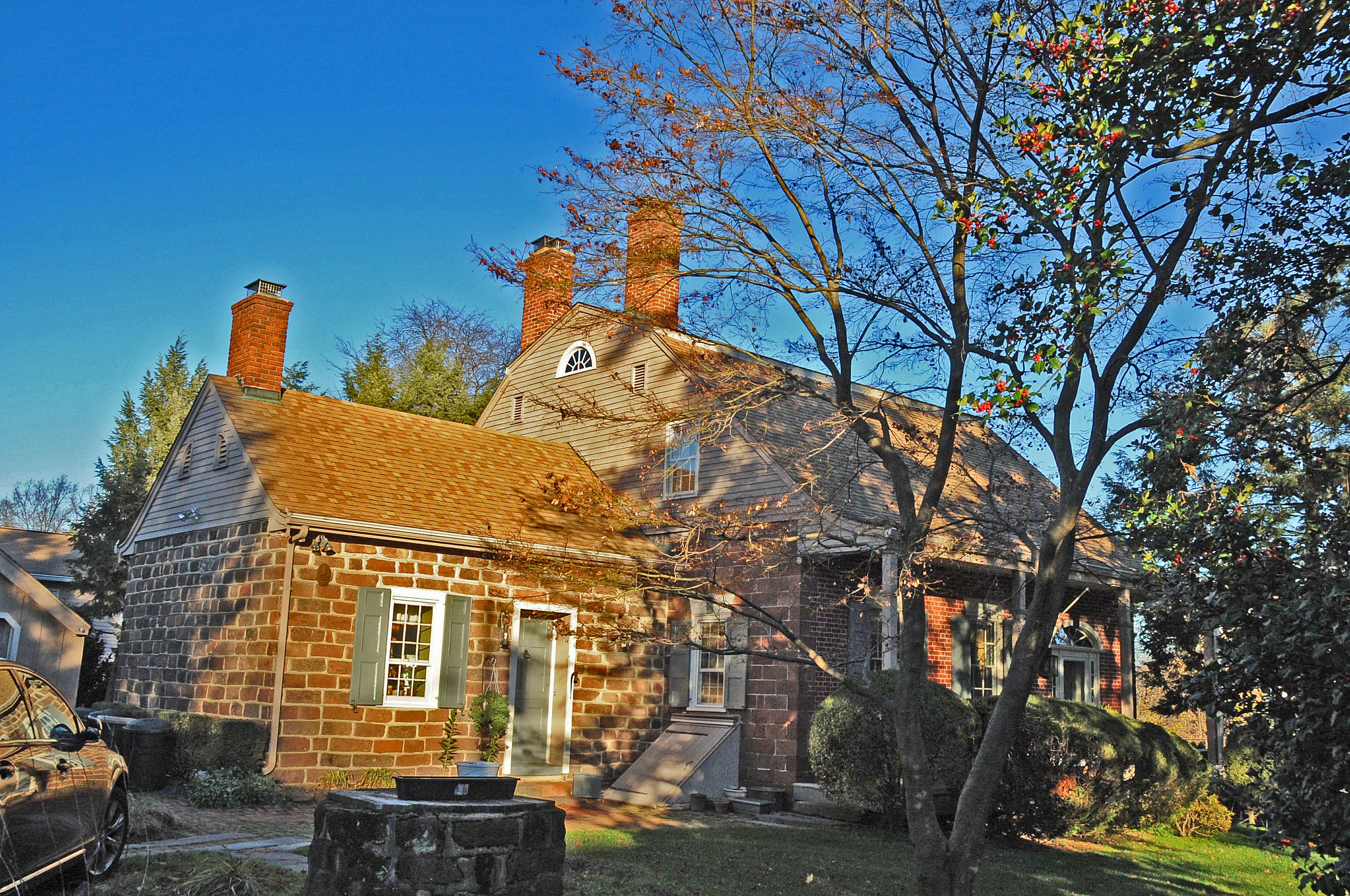

- Location within Bergen County, New Jersey Location within New Jersey Location within the United States
- Location: 56 Spring Valley Road, River Edge, New Jersey
- Coordinates: 40°56′21″N 74°1′44″W
- MPS: Stone Houses of Bergen County TR
- NRHP reference No.: 83001486
- NJRHP No.: 653

Significant dates
- Added to NRHP: January 10, 1983
- Designated NJRHP: October 3, 1980

The Debaun–Demarest House, also known as the Christie–Cooper House, is located at 56 Spring Valley Road in the borough of River Edge in Bergen County, New Jersey, United States. The historic stone house was added to the National Register of Historic Places on January 10, 1983, for its significance in architecture and exploration/settlement. It was listed as part of the Early Stone Houses of Bergen County Multiple Property Submission (MPS).

According to the nomination form, the house was built from around 1780 to 1830 based on architectural evidence. Jacob Debaun and Maria Cooper were married in 1783 and likely lived here. Their daughter Catherine married David D. Demarest in 1806. Their son John G. Demarest sold the house to the Christie family in 1838. David W. Christie owned it in 1839. After his death, it was a hotel and tavern, the River Edge Hotel, for a short time.

== See also ==
- National Register of Historic Places listings in Bergen County, New Jersey
