= Calvin Demarest =

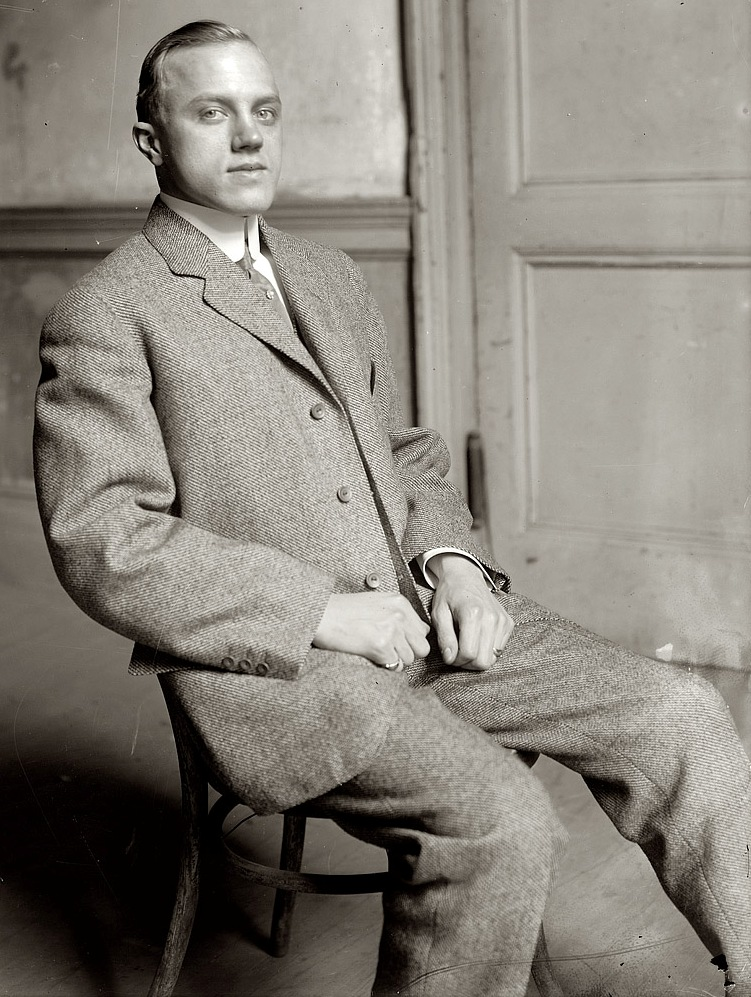
Calvin Demarest, date unknown

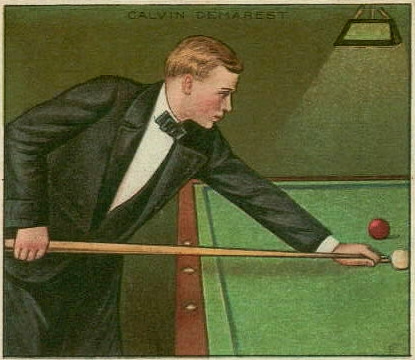
Demarest 1911 Mecca cigarette card

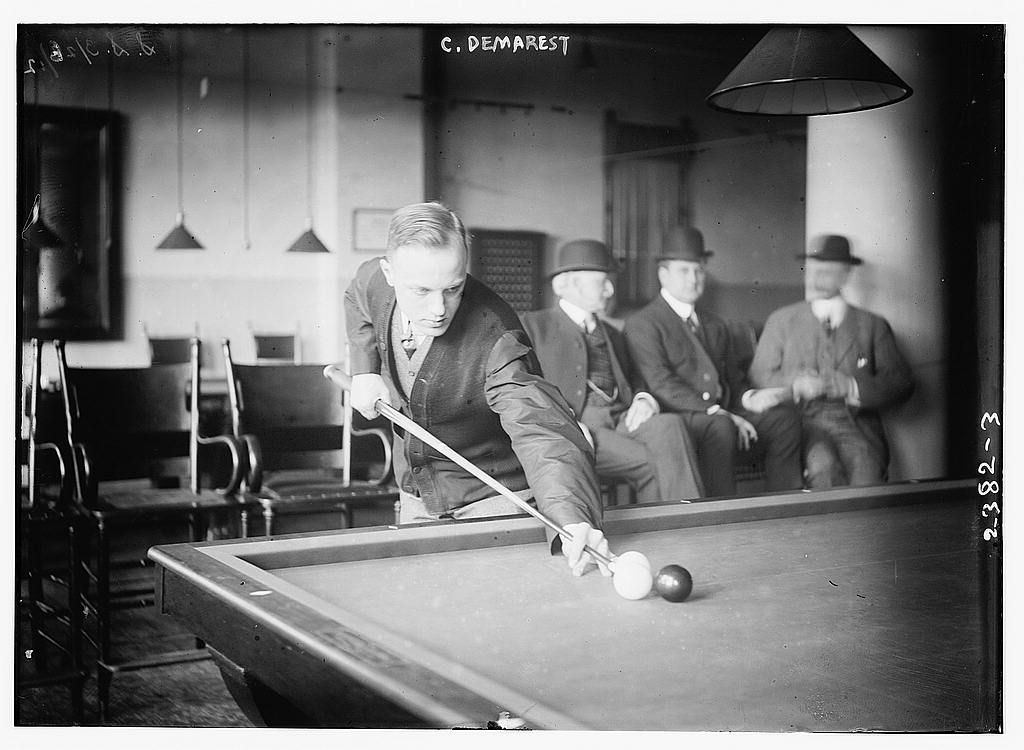
Demarest on March 26, 1912

Calvin W. Demarest (June 1886 – June 12, 1925) was a national amateur and professional carom billiards champion from Chicago in the early 20th century known for an open, crowd-pleasing style of play. He later gained notoriety for stabbing his wife and injuring his mother during a suicidal psychotic episode. Demarest won major amateur championships in 1907 and 1908.

== Biography ==
Demarest was born in June 1886 in Illinois. His mother was Ida B. Demarest (1860–1923) of Ohio He studied music as a child, his father an organist in Chicago, and his mother a singer. At an early age he developed an interest in pool and balkline billiards.

On March 9, 1907, he set a new record 14.2 balkline billiards average of 27 3–11 during the national amateur championship tournament in New York City beating the record set by Justus Ferdinand Poggenburg III.

On March 14, 1908, he broke the world's amateur record for the high run in the opening game of the national amateur 14.2 balkline tournament with an impressive high run of 168. He was competing against Clarence Jackson of Chicago. Starting in 1909, he competed in professional as well as amateur tournaments, winning at least three professional championships. In 1910, he defeated the renowned French champion Rerolle for the international amateur championship.

By the mid-1910s, Demarest's mental state began to deteriorate. Among other things, he would experience hallucinations regarding his wife, often that she was robbing him. On June 16, 1915, Demarest stabbed his wife in the throat several times with a pocket knife, wounding her severely, and then attempted to slit his own throat. His mother attempted to restrain him and was cut on the hand.

He was deemed unfit to stand trial and was remanded to the Elgin Asylum for the insane. He was reported to have died there eight months later, on February 22, 1916, but the following day's The New York Times ran an item titled "Calvin Demarest Not Dead", in which the paper wrote "Dr. Hawley, Deputy Superintendent at the asylum, is at a loss to explain how the report of Demarest's death occurred." Demarest would die on June 12, 1925 at the Elgin Asylum in Elgin, Illinois.
