= Demarest–Hopper House =

- U.S. National Register of Historic Places
- New Jersey Register of Historic Places
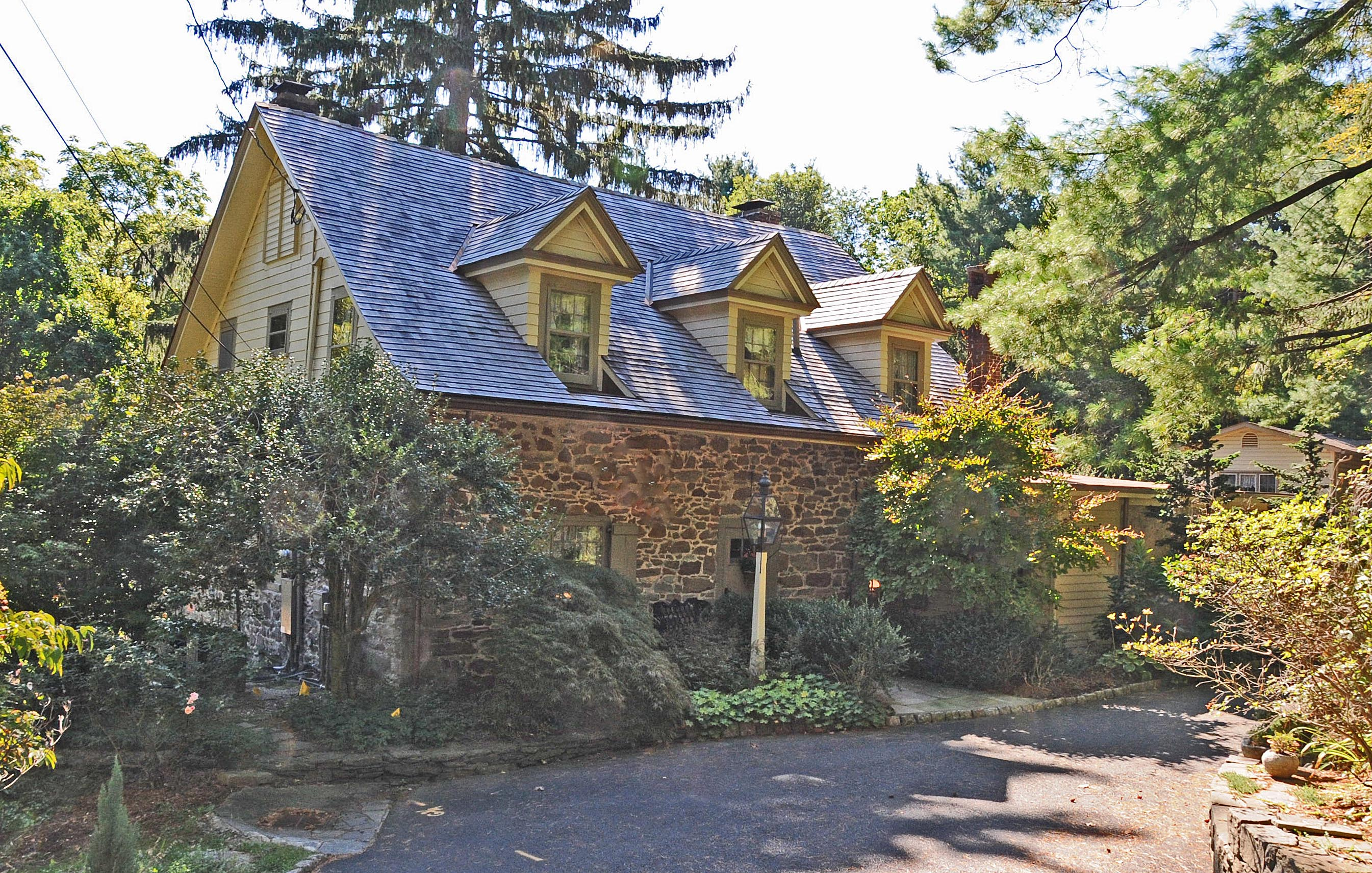

- Location within Bergen County, New Jersey Location within New Jersey Location within the United States
- Location: 21 Breakneck Road, Oakland, New Jersey
- Coordinates: 41°00′03″N 74°14′46″W
- Built: c. 1790–1810
- MPS: Stone Houses of Bergen County TR
- NRHP reference No.: 83001490
- NJRHP No.: 598

Significant dates
- Added to NRHP: January 10, 1983
- Designated NJRHP: October 3, 1980

The Demarest–Hopper House is located at 21 Breakneck Road in the borough of Oakland in Bergen County, New Jersey, United States. The historic stone house was added to the National Register of Historic Places on January 10, 1983, for its significance in architecture. It was listed as part of the Early Stone Houses of Bergen County Multiple Property Submission (MPS).

According to the nomination form, the house was built from 1790 to 1810 based on architectural evidence. P. R. Demarest lived here in 1861 and Henry A. Hopper in 1876.

== See also ==
- National Register of Historic Places listings in Bergen County, New Jersey
