= Thomas Demarest House =

Historic house in New Jersey, United States

- U.S. National Register of Historic Places
- New Jersey Register of Historic Places
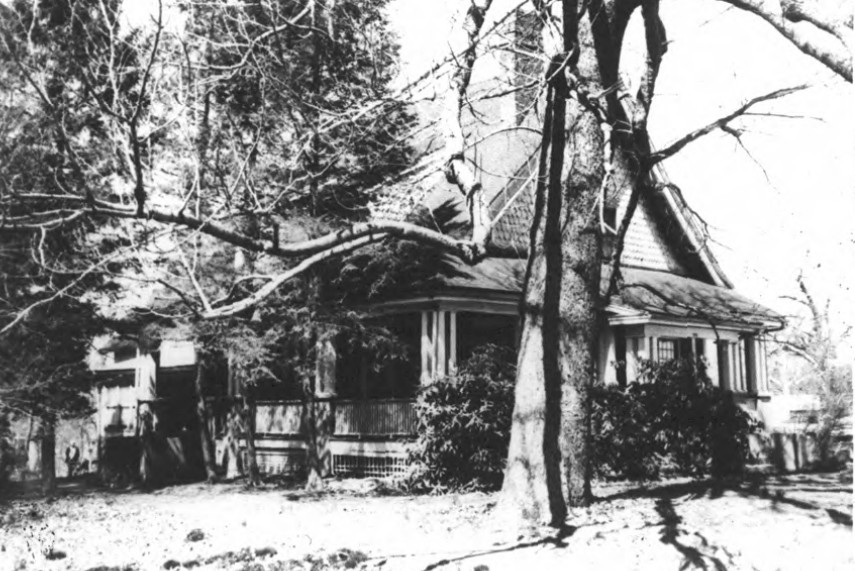
- Photo c. 1983

- Location within Bergen County, New Jersey Location within New Jersey Location within the United States
- Location: 370 Grand Avenue, Englewood, New Jersey
- Coordinates: 40°53′8″N 73°58′41″W
- Built: 1803
- MPS: Stone Houses of Bergen County TR
- NRHP reference No.: 83001498
- NJRHP No.: 471

Significant dates
- Added to NRHP: January 9, 1983
- Designated NJRHP: October 3, 1980

The Thomas Demarest House was located at 370 Grand Avenue in the city of Englewood in Bergen County, New Jersey, United States. The historic stone house was built in 1803. It was added to the National Register of Historic Places on January 9, 1983, for its significance in architecture. It was listed as part of the Early Stone Houses of Bergen County Multiple Property Submission (MPS). The house was demolished in May 1995 by a developer and replaced by a non-descript commercial building.

According to the nomination form, Thomas W. Demarest, who was the son of the Rev. Cornelius T. Demarest, was living here in 1861.

== See also ==
- National Register of Historic Places listings in Bergen County, New Jersey
