= Davenport–Demarest House =

- U.S. National Register of Historic Places
- New Jersey Register of Historic Places
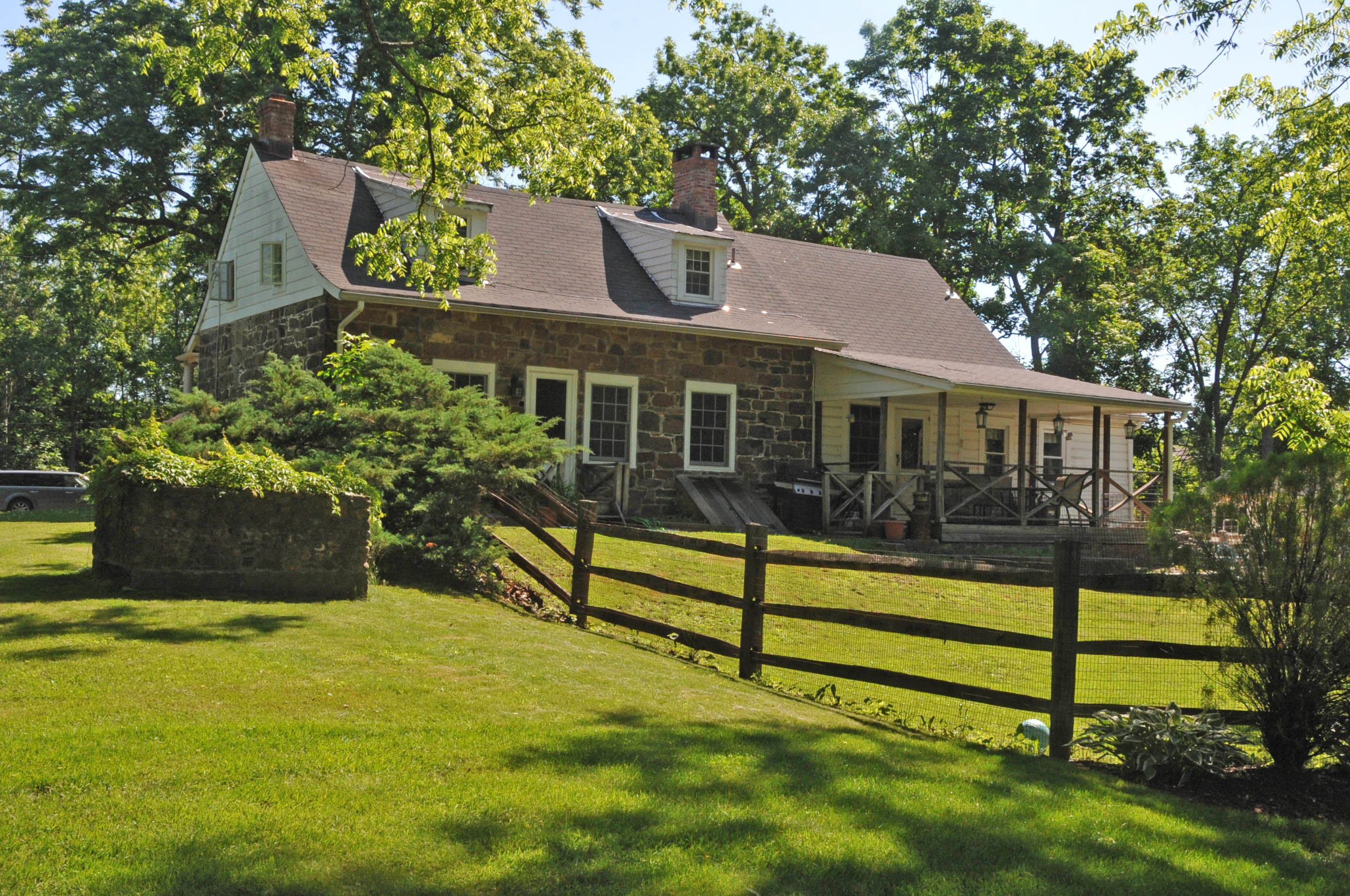

- Location within Morris County, New Jersey Location within New Jersey Location within the United States
- Location: 140 Changebridge Road; Montville, New Jersey
- Coordinates: 40°53′38″N 74°22′00″W
- Built: c. 1720–1780
- Architectural style: Colonial, Dutch Colonial
- MPS: Dutch Stone Houses in Montville MPS
- NRHP reference No.: 91001934
- NJRHP No.: 2151

Significant dates
- Added to NRHP: January 17, 1992
- Designated NJRHP: November 25, 1991

The Davenport–Demarest House is a historic stone farmhouse located at 140 Changebridge Road in the township of Montville in Morris County, New Jersey. The oldest section was built c. 1720–1780. The farmhouse was documented by the Historic American Buildings Survey in 1938. It was added to the National Register of Historic Places on January 17, 1992, for its significance in architecture. It was listed as part of the Dutch Stone Houses in Montville Multiple Property Submission (MPS).

== History and description ==
Humphrey Davenport (1656–1735) purchased land in the area starting in 1714. His son, Humphrey Davenport Jr. (1697–1770) sold his share to Robert Gould Sr. in 1734, before his father died. Gould was the first town clerk of Pequannock and a county judge. His son inherited the property and mortgaged it to John Salter in 1782. He sold it to Samuel Demarest in 1788. His son Lawrence Demarest owned it next. The oldest section of the house may have built as early as 1720 or as late as 1780. The stone farmhouse features local Dutch Colonial architecture. A frame wing was added in the 1920s.

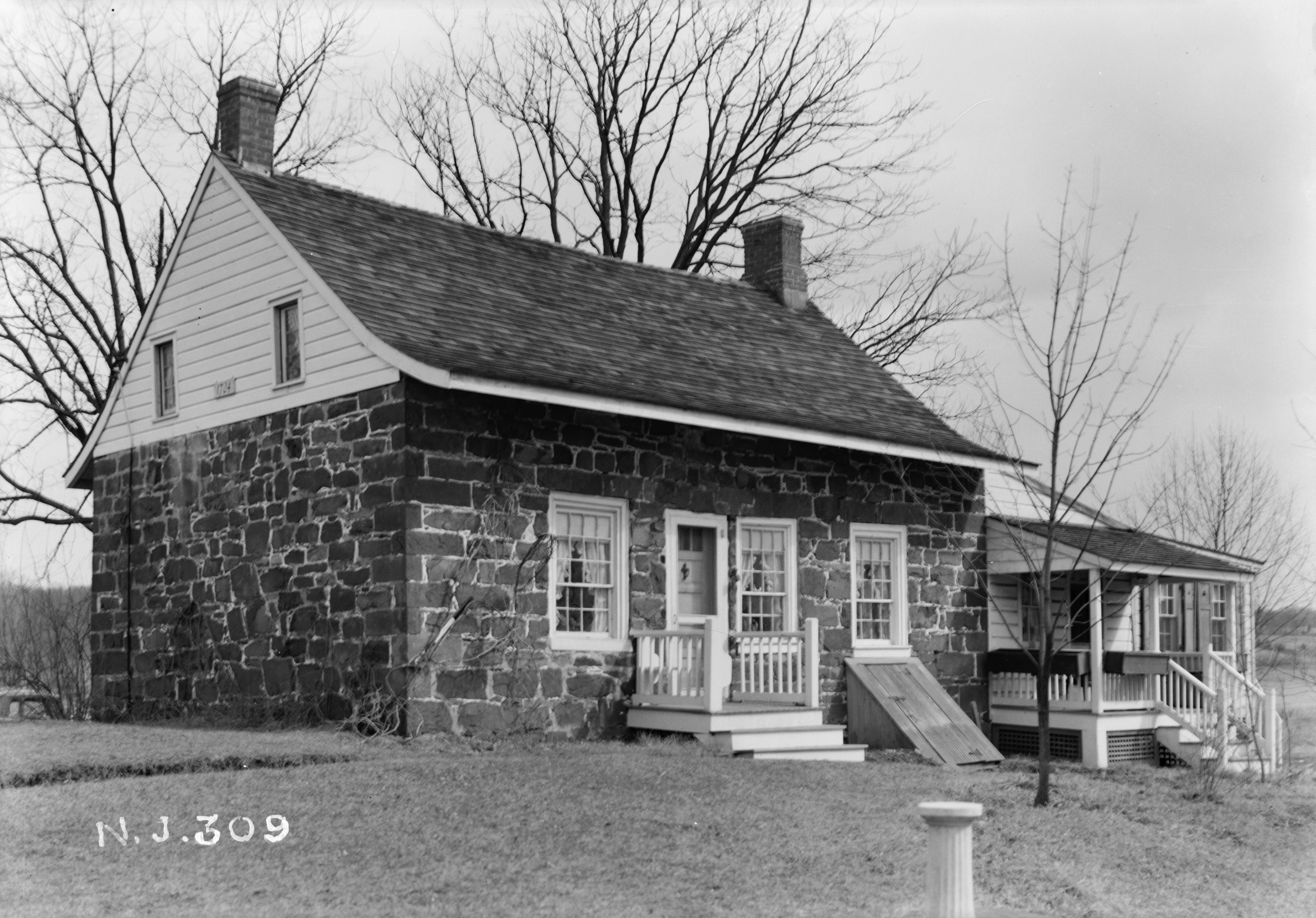
HABS photo from 1938

== See also ==
- National Register of Historic Places listings in Morris County, New Jersey
- List of the oldest buildings in New Jersey
