= Jacobus Demarest House (Oakland, New Jersey) =

Historic house in New Jersey, United States

- U.S. National Register of Historic Places
- New Jersey Register of Historic Places
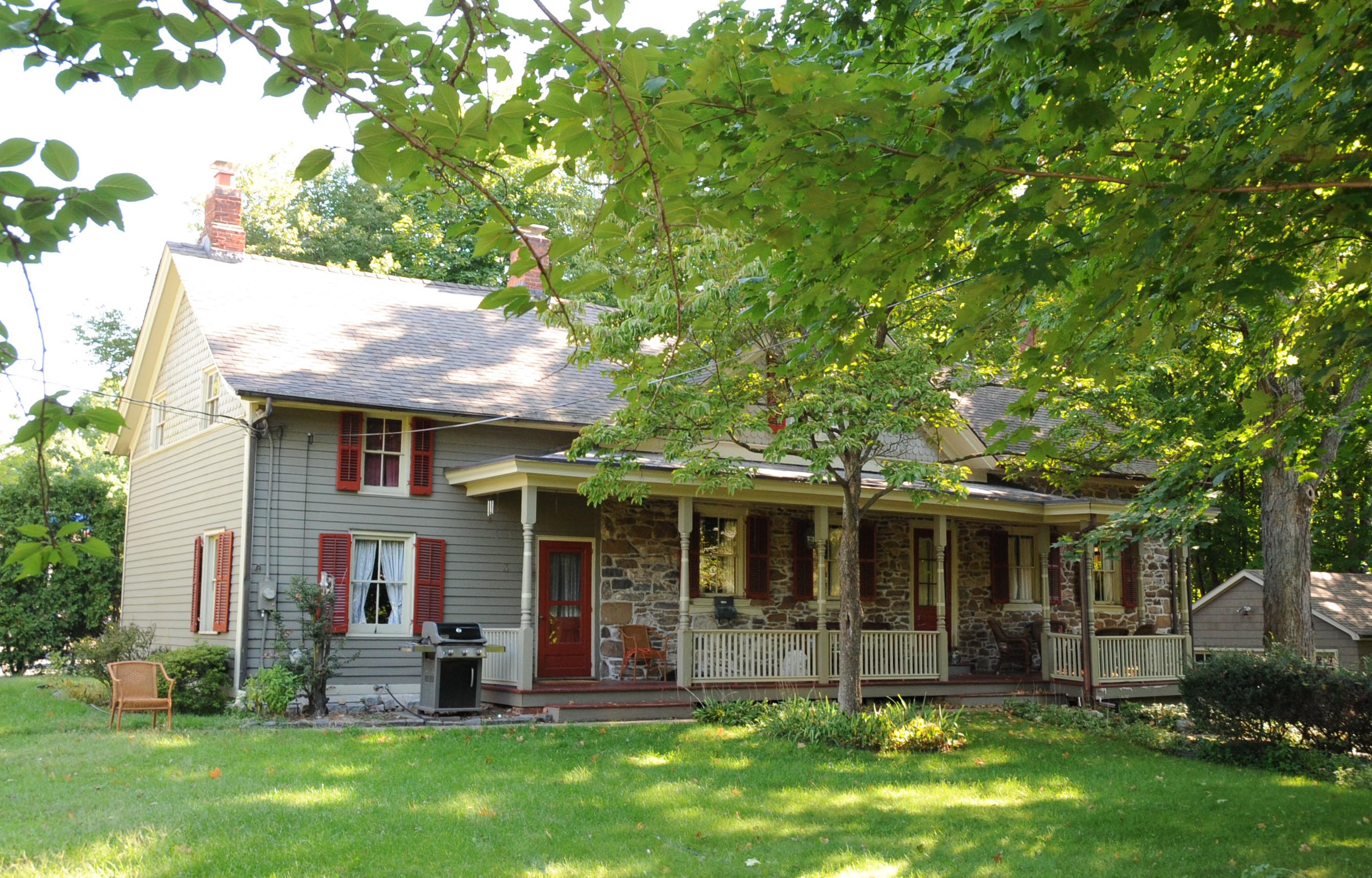
- Jacobus Demarest House in 2015

- Location within Bergen County, New Jersey Location within New Jersey Location within the United States
- Location: 252 Ramapo Valley Road / 3 Dogwood Drive, Oakland, New Jersey
- Coordinates: 41°1′8″N 74°14′53″W
- MPS: Stone Houses of Bergen County TR
- NRHP reference No.: 83001493
- NJRHP No.: 599

Significant dates
- Added to NRHP: January 10, 1983
- Designated NJRHP: October 3, 1980

The Jacobus Demarest House, also known as the Jacobus S. Demarest House, is located at 3 Dogwood Drive, at the intersection with Ramapo Valley Road, in the borough of Oakland in Bergen County, New Jersey, United States. The historic stone house was added to the National Register of Historic Places on January 10, 1983, for its significance in architecture. It was listed as part of the Early Stone Houses of Bergen County Multiple Property Submission (MPS).

According to the nomination form, the house was constructed between 1770 and 1800, based on architectural information. Jacobus S. Demarest is a descendant of David des Marest, an early French settler in the county.

== See also ==
- National Register of Historic Places listings in Bergen County, New Jersey
