= Samuel R. Demarest House =

Historic house in New Jersey, United States

- U.S. National Register of Historic Places
- New Jersey Register of Historic Places
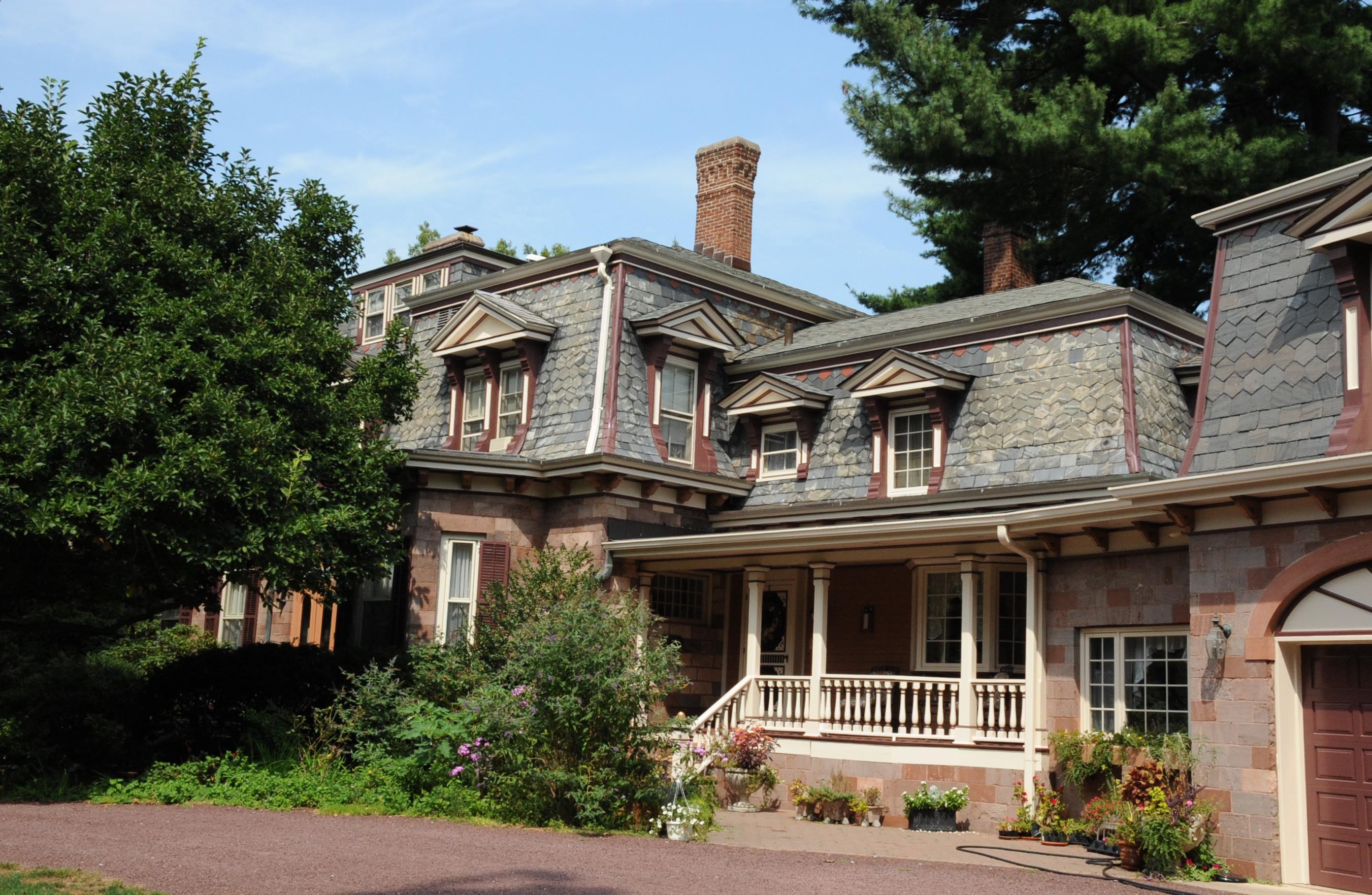

- Location within Bergen County, New Jersey Location within New Jersey Location within the United States
- Location: 212 County Road, Demarest, New Jersey
- Coordinates: 40°57′20″N 73°57′44″W
- Area: 5.9 acres (2.4 ha)
- Built: 1817
- Built by: Samuel R. Demarest
- MPS: Stone Houses of Bergen County TR
- NRHP reference No.: 84002552
- NJRHP No.: 454

Significant dates
- Added to NRHP: July 24, 1984
- Designated NJRHP: October 3, 1980

The Samuel R. Demarest House is located at 212 County Road in the borough of Demarest in Bergen County, New Jersey, United States. The historic stone house was built in 1817, by tradition, and features a slate mansard roof. It was added to the National Register of Historic Places on July 24, 1984, for its significance in architecture and exploration/settlement. It was listed as part of the Early Stone Houses of Bergen County Multiple Property Submission (MPS).

According to the nomination form, the house was probably built by Samuel R. Demarest (1783–1872). He was a descendant of David des Marest (Demarest), one of the earliest settlers in the county. The property was inherited by Samuel's son, Garret Z. Demarest, in 1872

== See also ==
- National Register of Historic Places listings in Bergen County, New Jersey
