= Ackerman–Demarest House =

Historic house in New Jersey, US

- U.S. National Register of Historic Places
- New Jersey Register of Historic Places
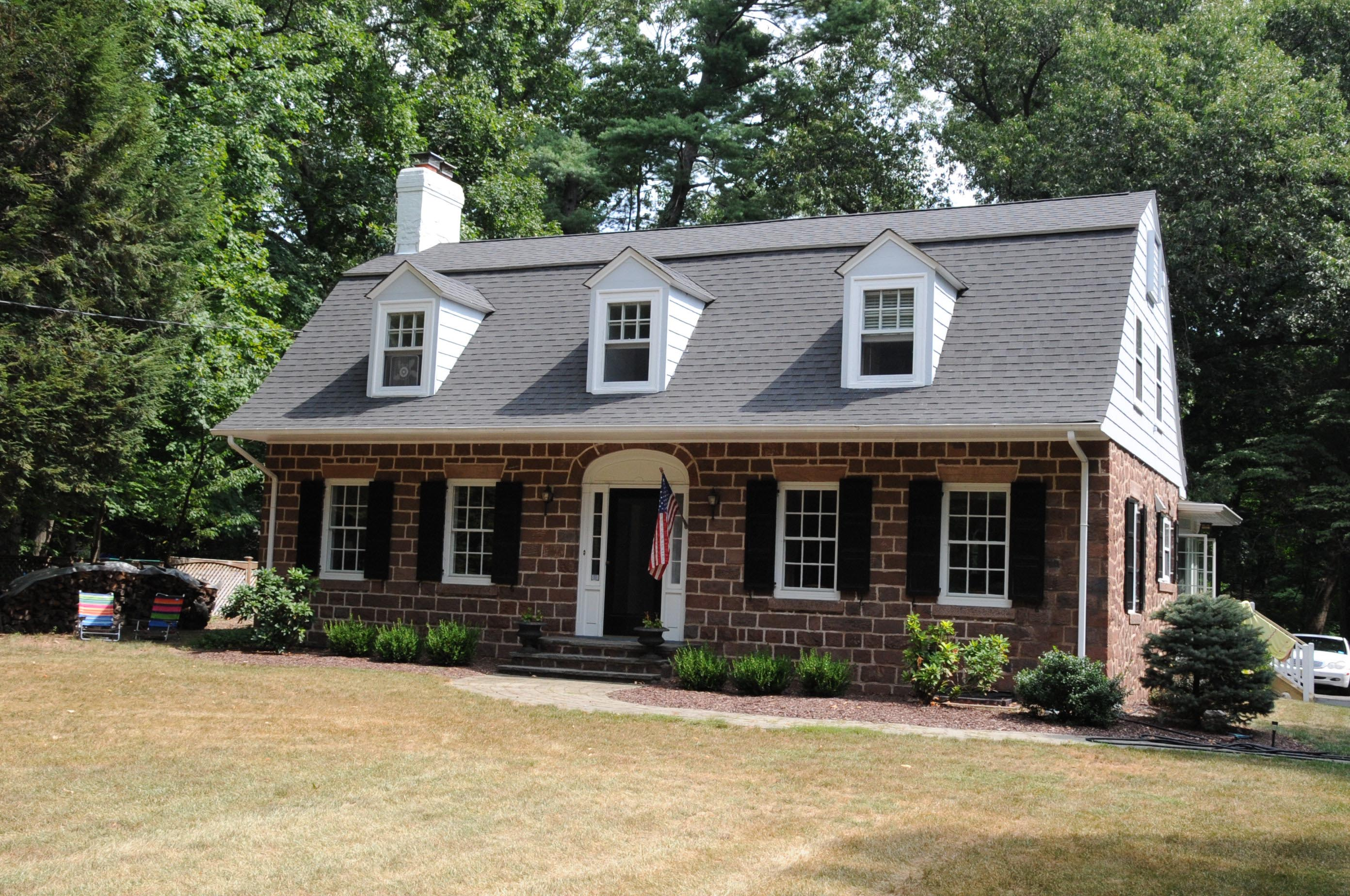

- Location within Bergen County, New Jersey Location within New Jersey Location within the United States
- Location: 605 East Saddle River Road, Ho-Ho-Kus, New Jersey
- Coordinates: 40°59′29.5″N 74°05′16.5″W
- Area: 1.9 acres (0.77 ha)
- Built: 1757
- MPS: Stone Houses of Bergen County TR
- NRHP reference No.: 83001454
- NJRHP No.: 539

Significant dates
- Added to NRHP: January 10, 1983
- Designated NJRHP: October 3, 1980

The Ackerman–Demarest House is located at 605 East Saddle River Road in the borough of Ho-Ho-Kus in Bergen County, New Jersey, United States. The historic stone house was built in 1757, by tradition. It was added to the National Register of Historic Places on January 10, 1983, for its significance in architecture. It was listed as part of the Early Stone Houses of Bergen County Multiple Property Submission (MPS).

According to the nomination form, William Cairns built a grist mill here in 1778. A house and mill are noted as Ackerman's Mill in 1780. Terhune is listed as the mill owner in 1791. B. S. Demarest owned the house by 1861.

== See also ==
- National Register of Historic Places listings in Bergen County, New Jersey
