= John R. Demarest House =

- U.S. National Register of Historic Places
- New Jersey Register of Historic Places
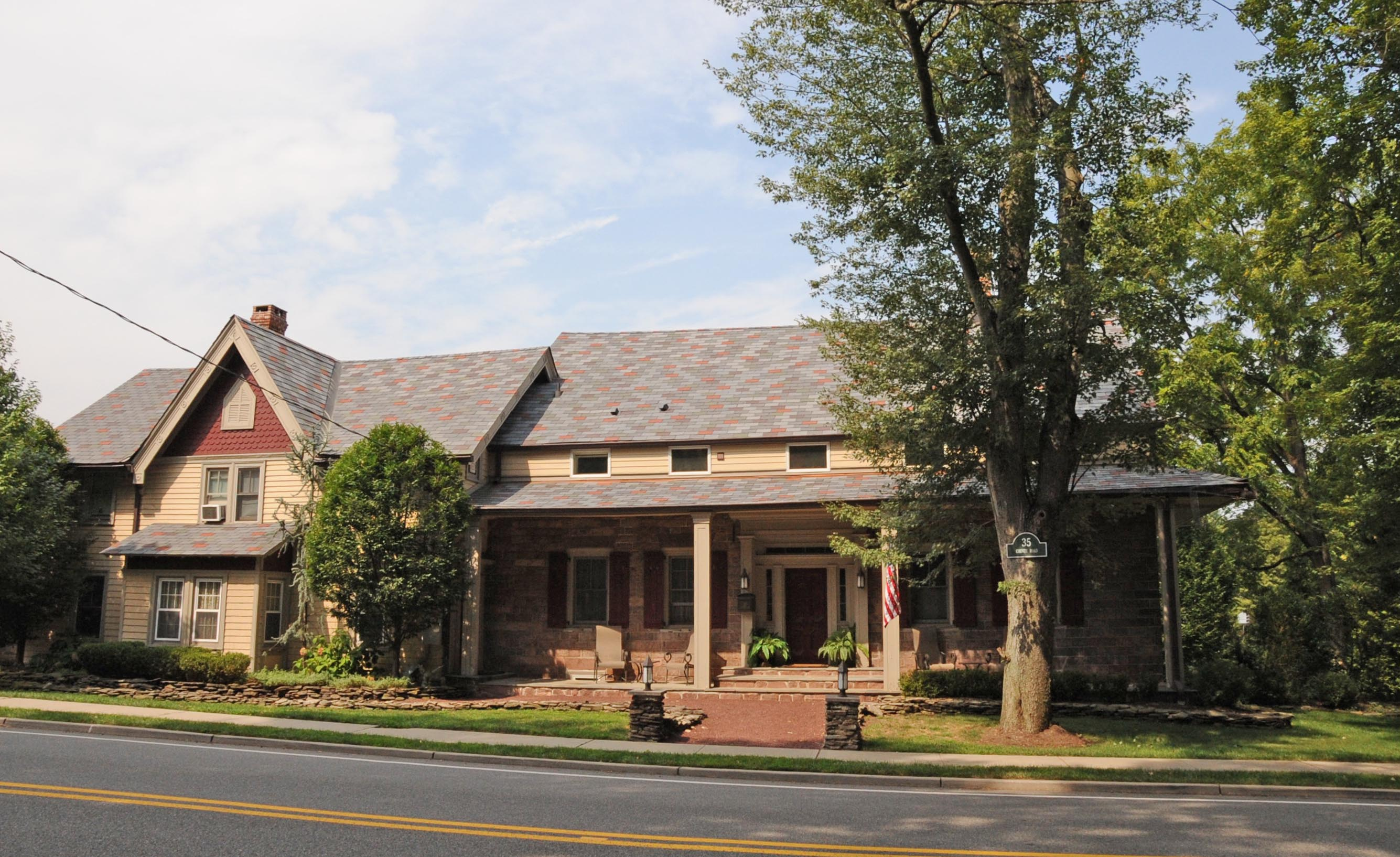

- Location within Bergen County, New Jersey Location within New Jersey Location within the United States
- Location: 35 County Road, Demarest, New Jersey
- Coordinates: 40°56′49″N 73°57′16″W
- Area: 6.9 acres (2.8 ha)
- Built: c. 1775–1800
- Built by: Roelef Demarest
- MPS: Stone Houses of Bergen County TR
- NRHP reference No.: 83001497
- NJRHP No.: 453

Significant dates
- Added to NRHP: January 9, 1983
- Designated NJRHP: October 3, 1980

The John R. Demarest House is located at 35 County Road in the borough of Demarest in Bergen County, New Jersey, United States. The historic stone house was built around 1775 to 1800 based on architectural evidence. It was added to the National Register of Historic Places on January 9, 1983, for its significance in architecture. It was listed as part of the Early Stone Houses of Bergen County Multiple Property Submission (MPS).

According to the nomination form, the house was probably built by Roelef Demarest. His son John R. Demarest lived here with his with Margaret Cole. He operated a nearby woolen mill.

== See also ==
- National Register of Historic Places listings in Bergen County, New Jersey
