= Demarest House (Oradell, New Jersey) =

Historic house in New Jersey, United States

- U.S. National Register of Historic Places
- New Jersey Register of Historic Places
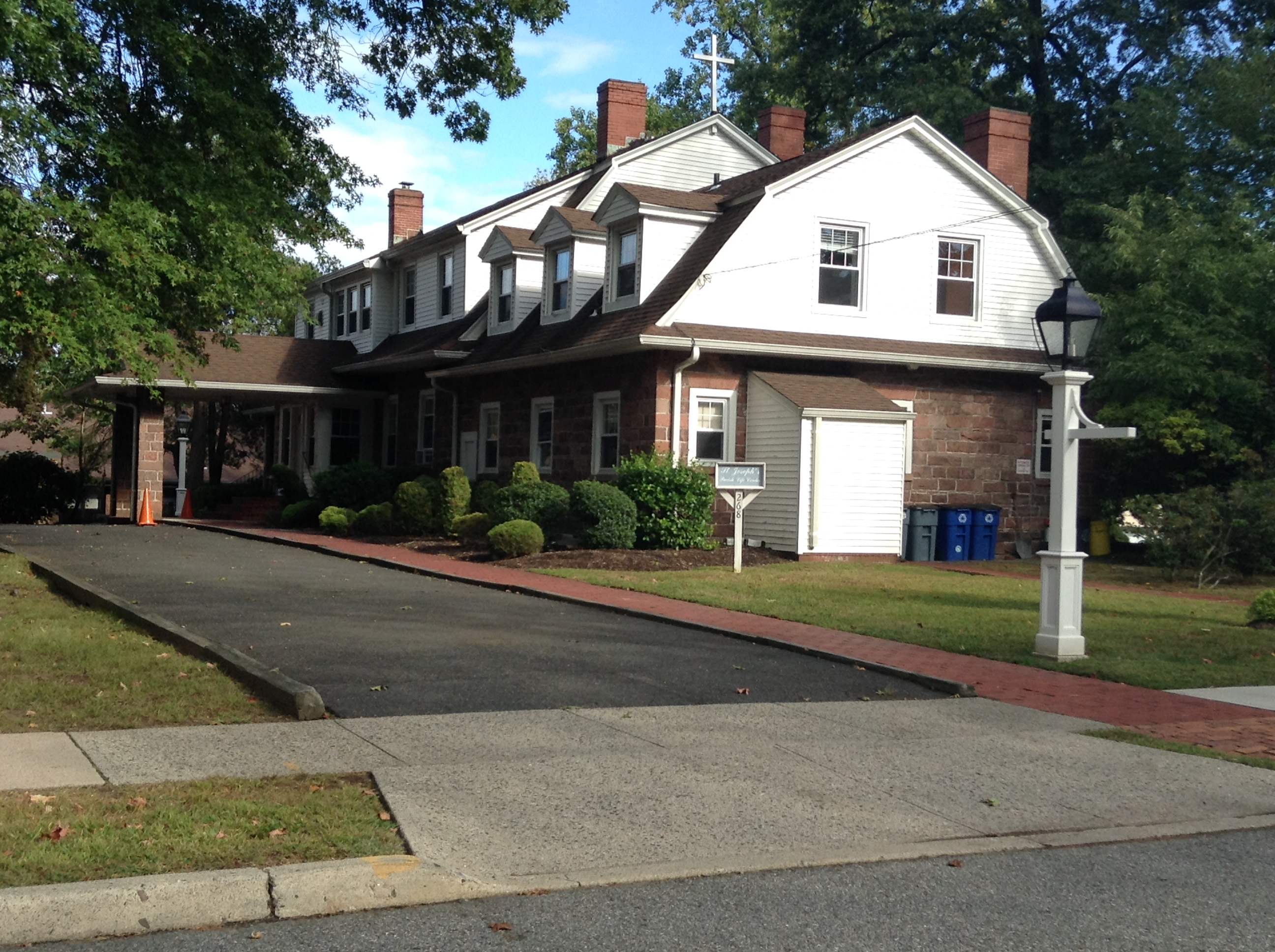

- Location within Bergen County, New Jersey Location within New Jersey Location within the United States
- Location: 268 Grove Street, Oradell, New Jersey
- Coordinates: 40°57′0″N 74°1′35″W
- Area: 2.5 acres (1.0 ha)
- Built: 1819
- MPS: Stone Houses of Bergen County TR
- NRHP reference No.: 83001496
- NJRHP No.: 611

Significant dates
- Added to NRHP: January 10, 1983
- Designated NJRHP: October 3, 1980

The Demarest House is located at 268 Grove Street in the borough of Oradell in Bergen County, New Jersey, United States. The historic stone house was built in 1819 and added to the National Register of Historic Places on January 10, 1983, for its significance in architecture. It was listed as part of the Early Stone Houses of Bergen County Multiple Property Submission (MPS).

== History ==
According to the nomination form, the house was probably built by Peter P. Demarest. It remained in the Demarest family until around 1900, when it was sold to Hugh J. Grant, who was mayor of New York City from 1889 to 1892. Later Peter P. Demarest's grandson, John G. Demarest, acquired the house.

== See also ==
- National Register of Historic Places listings in Bergen County, New Jersey
