= Joseph M. Demarest =

Joseph M. Demarest, Jr. is an associate executive assistant director of the Federal Bureau of Investigation (FBI), and was formerly the assistant director in charge of the FBI's cyber division. He is responsible for the FBI's operations to protect the United States from cyber-based national security threats.

== Early career ==
Before joining the FBI, Demarest was a Deputy Sheriff in Hillsborough County, Florida. Demarest left the FBI in 2008 and worked as an executive for Goldman Sachs, before returning to the FBI in January 2009.

== FBI career ==
Demarest began his career at the FBI in 1988 as a special agent. He was initially assigned to the Anchorage Division, where he investigated white collar crime, drug, violent crime, and foreign counterintelligence cases. In 1990, he was transferred to the New York Division, where he was assigned to a Colombian drug squad. He was promoted to squad supervisor in 1999, and was selected as SWAT team leader. In 2000, he was selected to serve as the drug branch's acting assistant special agent in charge.

After the September 11 attacks in 2001, Demarest was selected as one of two shift commanders for the PENTTBOM investigation. In that position, he led an ad hoc task force of over 400 federal, state, and local investigators from over 40 agencies to investigate the more than 5,500 PENTTBOM-related leads.

Demarest was promoted to unit chief at FBI Headquarters in 2002, where he served in the International Terrorism Operations Section (ITOS) within the Counterterrorism Division. In 2003, he was promoted to assistant section chief of ITOS. He later served as an acting section chief in ITOS until he was promoted to management positions in the International Terrorism Branch for the New York Division, ultimately becoming special agent in charge for counterterrorism. He served in that role until early 2008.

In January 2009, Demarest began serving as the assistant director in charge of the New York Division, where he oversaw several major investigations, including the terrorism investigation OPERATION HIGHRISE; the Bernard Madoff case; and the piracy investigation of MV Maersk Alabama.

In March 2010, Demarest was reassigned to Washington headquarters while the Inspector General's Office investigated statements he made about an alleged relationship he was having with FBI Special Agent Teresa Carlson.

In June 2012, Demarest was appointed the assistant director of the FBI's Cyber Division following the departure of former assistant director Gordon M. Snow. In 2015, he was promoted by FBI director James Comey to the position of associate executive assistant director.
