= Daniel Demarest House =

Historic house in New Jersey, United States

- U.S. National Register of Historic Places
- New Jersey Register of Historic Places
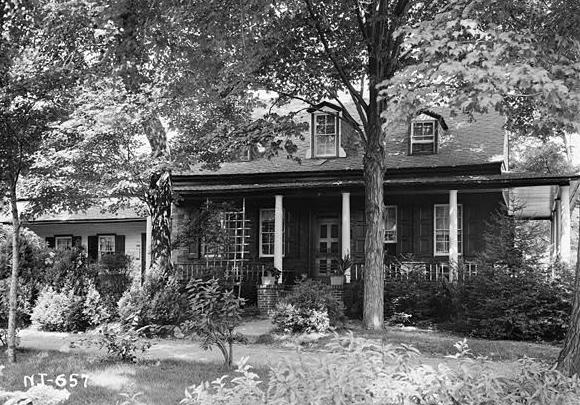
- HABS image from 1940

- Location within Bergen County, New Jersey Location within New Jersey Location within the United States
- Location: 404 Washington Avenue, Dumont, New Jersey
- Coordinates: 40°56′53″N 73°59′27″W
- Built: 1724
- Built by: James P. Demarest
- MPS: Stone Houses of Bergen County TR
- NRHP reference No.: 83001499
- NJRHP No.: 457

Significant dates
- Added to NRHP: January 9, 1983
- Designated NJRHP: October 3, 1980

The Daniel Demarest House is located at 404 Washington Avenue in the borough of Dumont in Bergen County, New Jersey, United States. The historic stone house was built in 1724, according to an inscribed datestone. It was documented as being owned by Daniel Demarest in the Historic American Buildings Survey (HABS) of 1940. The house was added to the National Register of Historic Places on January 9, 1983, for its significance in architecture. It was listed as part of the Early Stone Houses of Bergen County Multiple Property Submission (MPS).

== History and description ==
According to the nomination form, the house was probably built by James P. Demarest, and restored around 1850 after a fire by Abraham G. Demarest (1819–1889). It is said to be one of the oldest houses in the county and is one of many Bergen Dutch houses built by descendants of early settlers to New Netherland. Daniel Demarest (1685–1767) was the grandson of David des Marest, an early French settler.

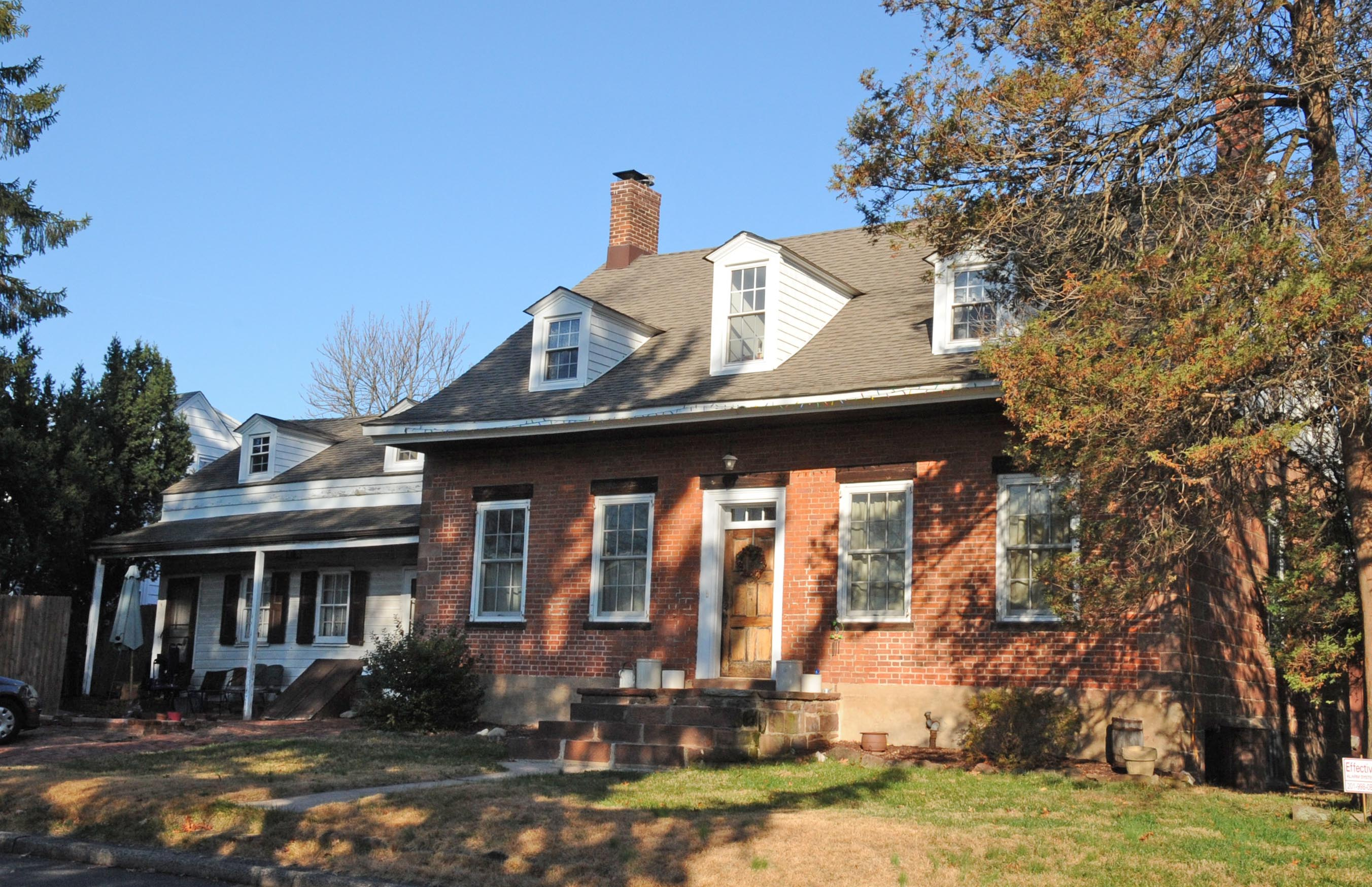
House in 2015

== See also ==
- National Register of Historic Places listings in Bergen County, New Jersey
- List of the oldest buildings in New Jersey
