= Demarest–Lyle House =

- U.S. National Register of Historic Places
- New Jersey Register of Historic Places
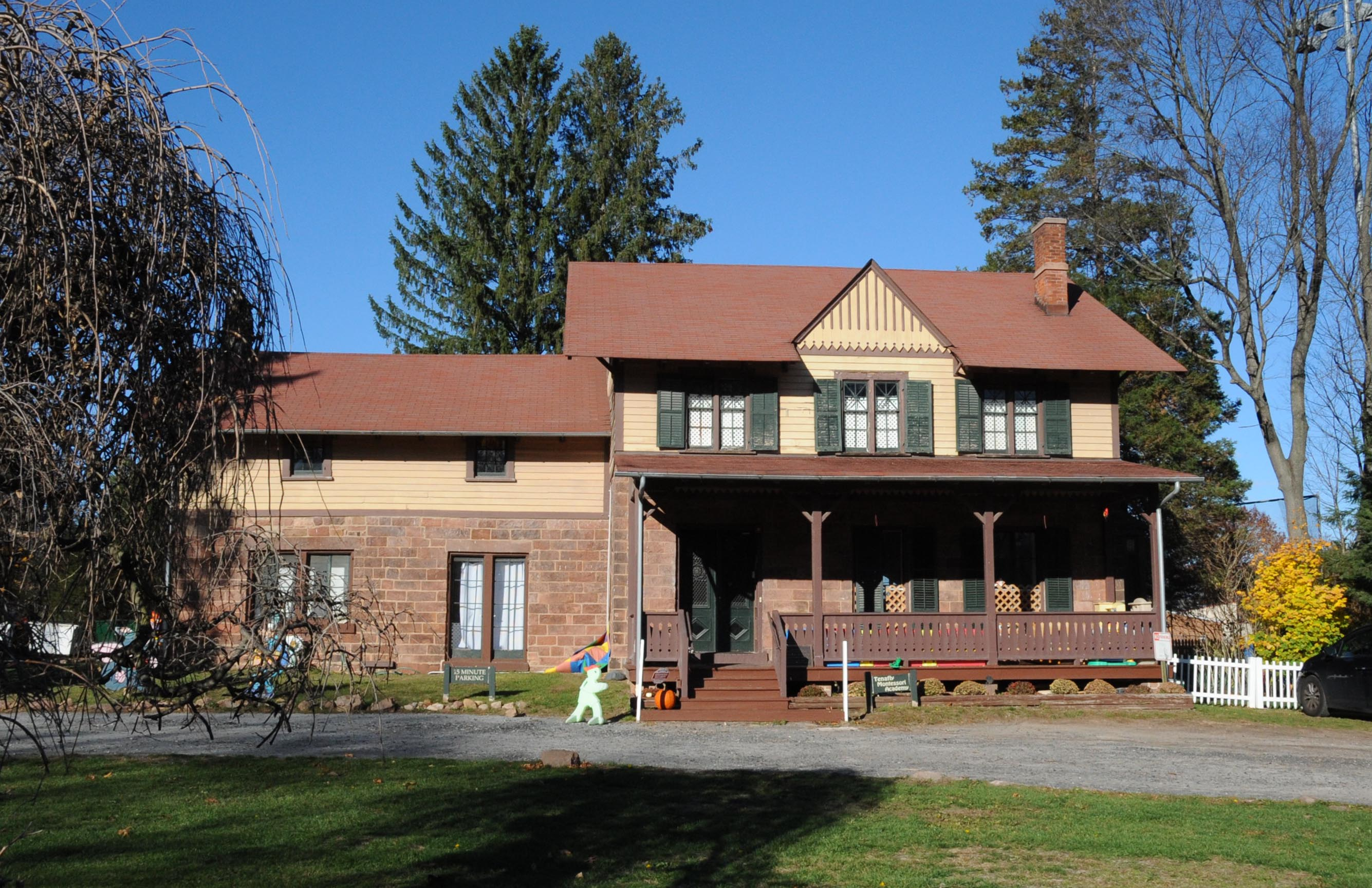

- Location within Bergen County, New Jersey Location within New Jersey Location within the United States
- Location: 91 W. Clinton Avenue, Tenafly, New Jersey
- Coordinates: 40°55′30″N 73°58′13″W
- MPS: Stone Houses of Bergen County TR
- NRHP reference No.: 83001494
- NJRHP No.: 705

Significant dates
- Added to NRHP: January 10, 1983
- Designated NJRHP: October 3, 1980

The Demarest–Lyle House is located at 91 W. Clinton Avenue in the borough of Tenafly in Bergen County, New Jersey, United States. The historic stone house was added to the National Register of Historic Places on January 10, 1983, for its significance in architecture. It was listed as part of the Early Stone Houses of Bergen County Multiple Property Submission (MPS).

According to the nomination form, the house was built by a member of the Demarest family in the early 19th century based on architectural evidence. Charles Newcomb made changes to the house during the 1860s. His son-in-law, John S. Lyle, bought the house in 1912.

== See also ==
- National Register of Historic Places listings in Bergen County, New Jersey
