= Burlington Towne Centre station =

Train station in Burlington, New Jersey

Burlington Towne Centre
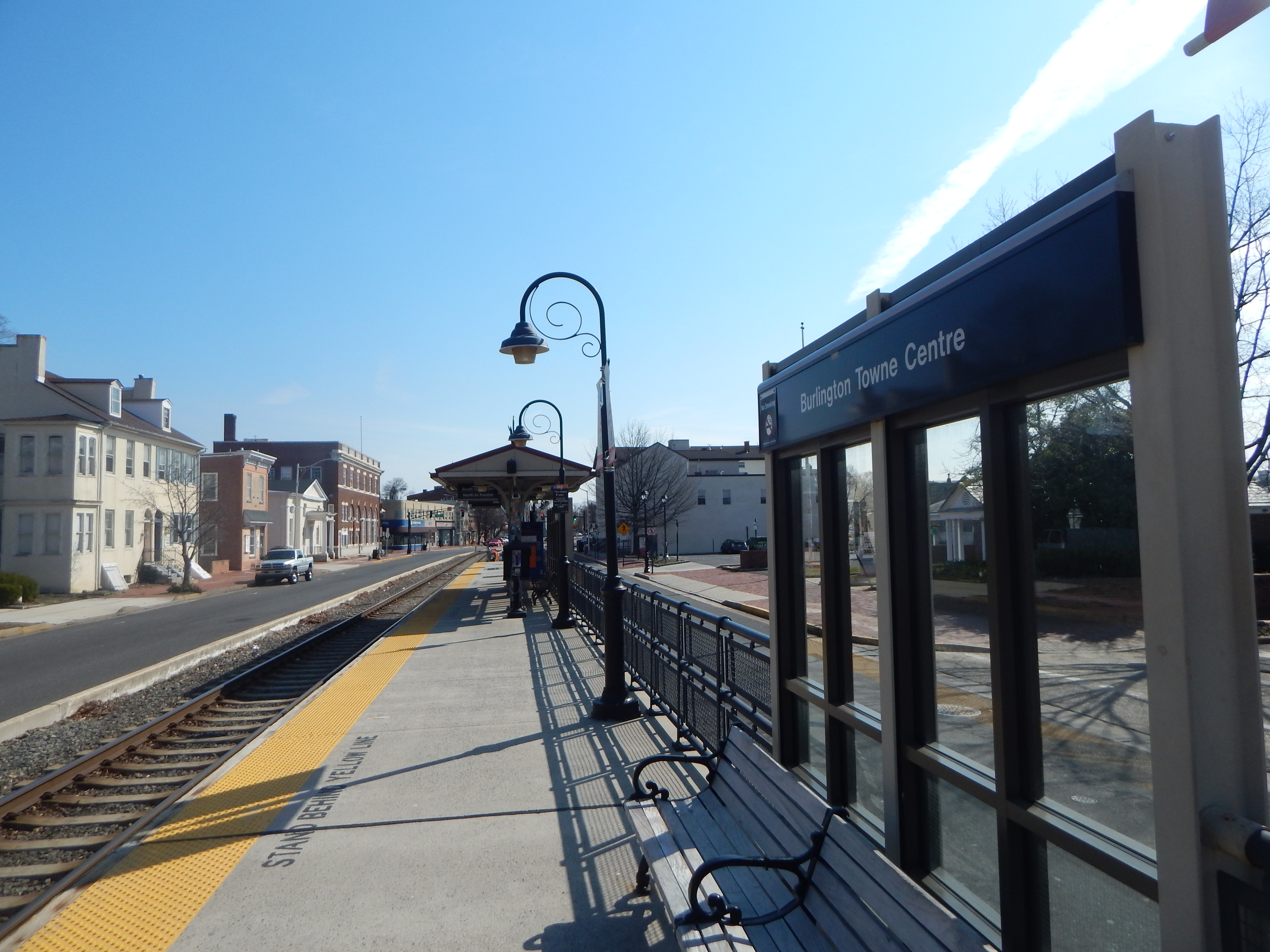
- The Burlington Towne Centre station in April 2015.

General information
- Location: West Broad Street; Burlington, New Jersey
- Coordinates: 40°4′38″N 74°51′34″W
- Owner: New Jersey Transit
- Platforms: 1 side platform
- Tracks: 1
- Connections: NJ Transit Bus: 409, 413

Construction
- Accessible: Yes

Other information
- Fare zone: 1

History
- Opened: March 15, 2004

Services
| Preceding station | NJ Transit | Following station |
|---|---|---|
| Burlington South toward Entertainment Center | River Line | Florence toward Trenton |

Former services
| Preceding station | Pennsylvania Railroad | Following station |
|---|---|---|
| Edgewater Park toward Camden | Amboy Branch | East Burlington toward South Amboy |
Location

Burlington Towne Centre station is a station on the River Line light rail system, located on West Broad Street in Burlington, Burlington County, New Jersey, United States within the Burlington Historic District. The tracks run in the middle of the street in a thin trench, so while it does run in the middle of the street, it is not considered "street running." Like many other River Line stations, the Towne Centre station is made up of a raised, accessible platform with ticket machines and a small passenger shelter. Of note, the station name uses the spelling "centre" rather than the more usual "center".

== History ==
The station site was home to the Pennsylvania Railroad's station. Service between Trenton and Camden ended on June 28, 1963.

The station opened on March 15, 2004. Southbound service from the station is available to Camden, New Jersey. Northbound service is available to the Trenton Rail Station with connections to New Jersey Transit trains to New York City, SEPTA trains to Philadelphia, and Amtrak trains. Transfer to the PATCO Speedline is available at the Walter Rand Transportation Center.
