= List of the oldest buildings in New Jersey =

This article attempts to list the oldest extant buildings surviving in the state of New Jersey in the United States of America, including the oldest houses in New Jersey and any other surviving structures. Some dates are approximate and based upon dendrochronology, architectural studies, and historical records. Sites on the list are generally from the First Period of American architecture or earlier. To be listed here a site must:

- date from prior to 1776; or
- be the oldest building in a county, large city, or oldest of its type (church, government building, etc.),

== Colonial era ==
Building	Image	Place	Year	Purpose	Notes
C. A. Nothnagle Log House		Gibbstown	c. 1638–43	Residence	Purportedly the oldest surviving log house in the U.S., once part of New Sweden, and the oldest house in NJ, and hence Gloucester County
Swedish Granary		Hopewell Greenwich	1650/1780s		Relocated. Once part of New Sweden, purportedly the oldest surviving building of its type in the US and likely oldest structure in Cumberland County Dendrochronology study from 2018 states a date in the 1780s.
Sip Manor		Jersey City; Westfield	1666	Residence	Originally part of Bergen, New Netherland, relocated in 1926 from Hudson County and now oldest building in Union County
Parker Homestead		Little Silver	1667	Residence	One of the oldest homes in Monmouth County
Old Mill at Tinton Falls		Tinton Falls	c. 1674	Mill	
Obisquahassit		Lower Penns Neck	1678	Residence	Oldest house in Salem County Obisquahassit was the sachem who sold land to Anders Seneca, son of one of the first settlers to New Sweden who bought a large tract before Fenwick's Colony was established.
Stone House by the Stone House Brook		South Orange	pre-1680	Residence	Oldest house in Essex County. Original stone walls are visible within enveloping Queen Anne Victorian added in two stages in 1876 and prior to 1896.
Nathaniel Bonnell House		Elizabeth	1682 (1670)		Oldest house in Elizabethtown, original capital of Province of New Jersey and oldest original building in Union County
6 West Pearl Street; Penn's Brew House		Burlington	1682	Residence	Oldest brewhouse in state
Aaron Dunn Homestead		Woodbridge	1685	Residence	Possibly the oldest house in Woodbridge and Middlesex County.
Buckelew Mansion		Jamesburg	c. 1685	Residence	One room in the house dates to c. 1685, possibly oldest in Middlesex County. House was expanded, most recently in the 19th century, and is also known as Lakeview
Revell House		Burlington	1685	Residence	Oldest house in Burlington County
Oakley Farmhouse		Freehold Township	1686	Residence and farmstead	One of the longest running farmsteads in the state
Chew–Powell House		Gloucester Township	1688	Residence	Oldest house in Camden County
Ladd's Castle		West Deptford Township	c. 1688–90	Residence	Home to the surveyor John Ladd who assisted William Penn in planning Philadelphia. Oldest brick house in Gloucester County
Hendrick Fisher House		Franklin	1688	Residence	Oldest structure in Somerset County substantially renovated in early 20th century, now owned by Ukrainian Orthodox Church of the USA
Newkirk House		Jersey City	c. 1690	Commercial	Oldest building in Hudson County, originally built as homestead
Caesar Hoskins Log Cabin		Mauricetown	1690	Residence	Oldest house in Cumberland County
Robinson Plantation House		Clark	c. 1690	Residence	
Coxe Hall Cottage		Cold Spring	1691	Museum	Oldest extant structure in Cape May County once part of complex belonging to Daniel Coxe. Relocated/reconstructed at Historic Cold Spring Village
Griffith Morgan House		Pennsauken Township	1693	Residence	
Joseph Cooper House		Camden	1695	Abandoned	Oldest house in Camden; Roof burnt about 2005 and in danger of complete collapse.
Schuyler-Colfax House		Wayne	1695	Residence	Oldest buildings in Passaic County
John Mason House		Elsinboro	1695	Residence	Oldest part has patterned brick, date stone marked 1695
St. John's Parsonage		Elizabeth	1696	Parsonage	Oldest religious building in Elizabeth
Thomas Maskel House		Greenwich Township	1698	Residence	
Andrews-Barlett Homestead		Tuckerton Seaport	1699	Unused	Likely the oldest house in Ocean County
Mortonson–Van Leer Log Cabin		Swedesboro	c. 1700		One of the oldest Swedish-Finnish log buildings in America, adjacent to Trinity Church Cemetery
Hinchman-Lippincott House		Haddon Heights	c. 1700	Residence	First home in Haddon Heights, New Jersey
Westerbrook–Bell House		Sandyston Township	c. 1701	Residence	Oldest house in Sussex County
St. Mary's Episcopal Church		Burlington	1703	Religious	Oldest church in New Jersey
Mullica House		Mullica Hill	1704	Residence	Built by Swedish settler (with Finnish ancestry) Eric Mullica. Log house, which has survived more than 300 years and also Hurricane Sandy, which destroyed many other buildings.
Mead–Van Duyne House		Wayne	1706	Museum	Second oldest surviving Dutch stone house in Passaic County
Isaac Watson House		Hamilton	1708	Museum	Oldest building in Mercer County, restored in 1964 as headquarters of the NJ Society of the Daughters of the American Revolution
Jonathan Singletary Dunham House		Woodbridge Township	1709	Residence	Built by Jonathan Singletary Dunham, who built the first gristmill in New Jersey and was a member of the New Jersey Assembly Date of 1709 ascertained through tree-ring dating.
Rockingham		Rocky Hill; Kingston	c. 1710	Museum	John Berrien's house served as the headquarters for George Washington and the Continental Army from August 23, 1783 to November 10, 1783. The house has been relocated three times: 1897, 1956, and 2001.
Plume House		Newark	1710	Rectory	Located near I-280 the house is threatened by pollution and vibration, and considered one of the 10 most threatened historical sites in the state
Burrough-Dover House		Pennsauken Township	1710	Residence	
Sydenham House		Newark	1711	Residence	Oldest private home in Newark
John Holcombe House		Delaware Township	1711	Museum	Part of Holcombe-Jimison Farmstead Museum. Oldest house in Hunterdon County
Shinn Curtis Log House		Mount Holly	1712		
Perth Amboy City Hall		Perth Amboy	1714–1717	City hall	Oldest city hall in US
Woodbury Friends' Meetinghouse		Woodbury	1715	Religious	Oldest Friends meeting house
Seaville Friends Meeting House		Seaville	1717	Religious	Friends meeting house
William Green House		Ewing Township, New Jersey	1717-1830	Residence (abandoned)	On grounds of The College of New Jersey
Derick Sutfin House		Manalapan	c. 1718	Residence (abandoned)	Located in Monmouth Battlefield State Park
William Trent House		Trenton	1719	Residence	Oldest house in Trenton, the state capitol, and served unofficially as governor's residence
Martin Berry House		Pequannock Township	1720	Residence	Former residence of Samuel Berry, Berry's were first family to settle Pompton Plains
Matthias Hendricke Smock House		Piscataway	1720	Residence	
Seabrook–Wilson House		Middletown	1720		Family tradition states that the house was built in 1663 by Thomas Whitlock, who came to the colony in 1648.
Van Wickle House		Franklin Township	1722	House	
Daniel Demarest House		Dumont	1724	Residence	Oldest building in Bergen County
Peachfield		Westampton Township	1725		
Somers Mansion		Somers Point	1725	Residence	Oldest intact house in Atlantic County
Van Veghten House		Finderne	c. 1725	Museum	Headquarters of Quartermaster General Nathanael Greene during the second (winter of 1778–79) Middlebrook encampment in the American Revolutionary War
Solitude House		High Bridge	c. 1725	Unused	Home of Robert Taylor, superintendent of the Union Iron Works, founded 1742. Temporary prison for John Penn and Benjamin Chew during the American Revolutionary War.
Davenport–Demarest House		Montville	c. 1730	Residence	
Morven		Princeton	1730	Residence	Served as the state's first Governor's mansion from 1945–1981.
Grover House		Middletown	c. 1730	Residence	
Joseph Ware House		Hancock's Bridge	c. 1730	Residence	
Village Inn		Englishtown	1732	Tavern	Served as the headquarters of George Washington after the Battle of Monmouth in June 1778
Holcombe House		Lambertville	c. 1733	Residence	Served as the headquarters of George Washington and the Continental Army, July 1777 and June 1778.
Hancock House		Lower Alloways Creek Township	1734	Residence	Major John Graves Simcoe led approximately 300 British soldiers and Queen's Rangers through a marsh and across Alloway Creek to surround Hancock House. They surprised 20 to 30 members of the local militia stationed there, along with Judge Hancock, killing most of them.
Old Salem County Courthouse		Salem	1735	Courthouse	Oldest active courthouse in New Jersey and second oldest courthouse in continuous use in the United States. Enlarged in 1817 and 1908, served as the courthouse for Salem County until 1969 and today for Salem City Municipal Court.
Wortendyke Barn		Park Ridge	1735	Barn	One of oldest New World Dutch barns
Woodruff House		Hillside	1735	Residence/Hillside Historical Society	
Samuel Mickle House		Haddonfield	1736	Residence	First home in Haddonfield, New Jersey
Droeschers Mill		Cranford	1737	Commercial	Oldest continuously operated commercial building in New Jersey
Upper Freehold Baptist Meeting		Upper Freehold Township	1737	Church	Ye Olde Yellow Meeting House, oldest Baptist Meetinghouse
Buccleuch Mansion		New Brunswick	1739	Residence	Visited by several prominent men, such as George Washington, Alexander Hamilton, General Kosciusko, General Gates, and John Hancock.
Hopper-Goetschius House		Upper Saddle River	1739		
Homestead Farm at Oak Ridge		Clark	c. 1720–1740		
Cedar Bridge Tavern		Barnegat	c. 1740	Unoccupied	Believed to contain oldest intact bar in the U.S. Site of the last skirmish of the American Revolutionary War.
The Red House		Ringwood	c. 1740	Unoccupied	Oldest structure in Ringwood, NJ, located on the grounds of Ringwood State Park.
Dey Mansion		Wayne	1740	Residence	Served as the headquarters of George Washington and the Continental Army from October to November 1780.
Staats House		South Bound Brook	c. 1740	Residence	Served as the headquarters of Baron William Frederick Von Steuben in the spring of 1779.
Van Vorst House		Jersey City	c. 1740	Residence	Oldest private home in Jersey City
Van Wagenen House		Jersey City	ca 1740s	Museum	Undergoing restoration per 2009
Ayers-Allen House aka Allen House Tavern		Metuchen, New Jersey	ca 1740		40°32′40″N 74°21′52″W
Oxford Furnace		Oxford	1741	Furnace	First hot blast furnace in United States
Cornelius Low House		Piscataway	1741	Residence	
Hutchings Homestead		Springfield	1741	Residence	Colloquially known as the "Cannon Ball House", it served as a British field hospital during the Battle of Springfield (1780)
Updike Parsonage Barn		Cranbury	1741	Barn	One of oldest barns in state
Trinity Church		Newark	1742	Church	Oldest church in Newark
Joseph Shinn House		Woodstown	1742	Residence	Also known as the Old Red House
Richard Holcombe House		Delaware Township	1744	Unused	Expanded in 1811.
Nathaniel Drake House		Plainfield	1746	Museum	George Washington briefly stayed at the house during the Battle of Short Hills. Currently operated as the Drake House Museum and home of the Historical Society of Plainfield.
Thomas West House		Westville	1746	Residence	
Craig House		Freehold Township	1746	Residence	Located in Monmouth Battlefield State Park
Westervelt–Ackerson House		Ramsey	1747	Museum	Also known as the Old Stone House, oldest home in Ramsey, NJ and home of the Ramsey Historical Association.
Zion Lutheran		Oldwick	1749	Church	Oldest Lutheran church in New Jersey
Boxwood Hall		Elizabeth	c. 1750	Residence	Home of Elias Boudinot, signer of the Treaty of Paris (1783) and the 10th President of the Continental Congress 1782–1783.
Indian King Tavern		Haddonfield	1750	Tavern	Served as the meeting place for the New Jersey General Assembly to ratify the Declaration of Independence and adopt the Great Seal of the State of New Jersey in 1777.
Isaac Onderdonk House		Piscataway	1750	Residence	
Simon Van Duyne House		Montville	c. 1750	Residence	
Old Dutch Parsonage		Somerville	1751	Parsonage	Jacob Rutsen Hardenbergh lived here and helped establish Queen's College, now known as Rutgers University. The original site was on the north side of the street, just east of the Wallace House, but the house was moved west when the railroad went through its original location.
Vreeland Homestead		Nutley	c. 1751	Museum	Operated by the Nutley Historical Society.
Mount Holly Firehouse		Mount Holly	1752	Firehouse	Oldest firehouse in the US, established by what is now the oldest continuously operating volunteer fire department in the US
Steuben House		New Bridge Landing	1752	Museum	
Neshanic Reformed Church		Hillsborough Township	1752	Church	Oldest church in New Jersey that is continuously used for its original purpose.
Dirck Gulick House		Montgomery Township	1752	Museum	Operated by the Van Harlingen Historical Society
Hankinson–Moreau–Covenhoven House		Freehold Borough	1752–1753	Museum	
Bishop–Irick Farmstead		Vincentown	1753	House	Headquarters and Visitors Center for the Pinelands Preservation Alliance
Old Tennent Church		Manalapan	1753	Church	Used as a field hospital during the Battle of Monmouth in June 1778
Nassau Hall		Princeton	1754	Academic	Housed the entire United States government in 1783
Holmes-Hendrickson House		Holmdel	1754	Residence	
Dickinson House (Alloway, New Jersey)		Alloway Township, New Jersey	1754	Residence	
Johannes Parlaman House		Montville	1755	Residence	
Shippen Manor		Oxford	1755	Residence	Possibly oldest house in Warren County
John Van Doren House		Millstone	c. 1755	Residence	Served as the headquarters for George Washington, the night of January 3–4, 1777 after the Battle of Princeton.
Gabreil Daveis Tavern House		Glendora	1756	Tavern	also known as the Hillman Hospital House, this tavern was built in 1756 near the Big Timber Creek and housed boatmen who used the creek to ship goods to Philadelphia. It was designated a hospital by George Washington during the Revolutionary War.
Samuel Fleming House		Flemington	1756	House	also known as Flemington Castle, is an historic home located in Flemington, in Hunterdon County, New Jersey, United States. The building is now operated as a museum. It is the oldest surviving house in the borough. It is part of the Flemington Historic District.
Alloways Creek Friends Meetinghouse		Hancock's Bridge	1756	Residence	
Steele-Condit House		Roseland	1757	Residence	Built approx 1720–1730. First recorded in 1757. Post-and-Beam construction. Oldest house in Roseland. Served as first school to area.
Old Barracks		Trenton	1758	Military	Last of its type, now National Historic Landmark & museum
Brainerd Schoolhouse		Mount Holly	1759	School	Oldest one room school, now a museum
William Chamberlain House		East Amwell	1760	Residence	
Haines/Tomlinson House		Medford, New Jersey	1760	Residence	Oldest structure in Medford
John Reading Farmstead		Raritan Township	1760	Residence	Home of John Reading, former governor of New Jersey, 1757–1758.
White Hill Mansion		Fieldsboro	1760	unused	
Mount Bethel Baptist Meetinghouse		Warren Township	1761	Museum	In Somerset County
John Newbold House		Chesterfield Township	c. 1761	Inn	At Fernbrook Farms in Burlington County
Proprietary House		Perth Amboy	1762	Government	Oldest remaining colonial proprietary governor's residence in the original Thirteen States
Seven Stars Tavern		Pilesgrove Township	1762	Tavern	In Salem County
Van Syckel's Tavern		Van Syckel	1763	Tavern	In Hunterdon County.
Caspar Westervelt House		Teaneck	1763	Residence	
Sandy Hook Light		Sandy Hook	1764	Lighthouse	Oldest surviving lighthouse in the United States.
Franklin House		Woodbury	pre-1765	Residence	Built before 1765 and originally a log cabin, the oldest surviving house in Woodbury was bought by a Joseph Franklin in 1823, and remained in his family until 1911. The exterior logs are intact but now have weatherboard cladding. Its front door, exposed beams, and one fireplace made from square handmade bricks are original.
Thatcher House		Kingwood Township	1765	Residence	
George Jr. and Sarah Morgan House		Washington Township	c. 1765	Museum	
Kingsland Manor		Nutley	1768	Residence	Built as a farmhouse in 1768 and expanded between 1790 and 1796 by Joseph Kingsland.
Samuel Johnson House		Franklin Corners	c. 1770	Residence	
Liberty Hall		Union	1772	Residence	The home of William Livingston, the first governor of New Jersey.
Rancocas Friends Meeting House		Rancocas	1772	Religious	
Van Houten–Van Allen House		Totowa	1772	Residence	
Crosswicks Friends Meeting House		Crosswicks	1773	Religious	
Christ Church		New Brunswick	1773 (tower)	Church	Episcopal Church, founded in 1742.
Campbell-Christie House		River Edge	1774	Museum	Part of Historic New Bridge Landing
Ford Mansion		Morristown	1774	Museum	The headquarters of George Washington and the Continental Army during the "Hard Winter" from December 1779 until May 1780.
Boudinot–Southard Farmstead		Bernards Township	pre-1776	Residence	Elias Boudinot moved here in November 1776.
Wallace House		Somerville	1776	Residence	Served as headquarters of General George Washington during the second Middlebrook encampment (1778–79)

== Post 1776 ==
Building	Image	Location	First Built	Use	Notes
First Reformed Dutch Church		Hackensack	1781	Religious	Oldest Dutch Reformed Church
Rahway and Plainfield Friends Meeting House		Plainfield	1788	Religious	First house of worship in Plainfield
New Jersey State House		Trenton	1792	Government	Second oldest statehouse in continuous use in the U.S.
Old Queens		New Brunswick	1809	Academic	Oldest building at Rutgers University.
Burlington County Prison		Mount Holly	1811	Prison	Possibly oldest prison building, which operated from 1811 to 1965
Pompton Reformed Church		Pompton Lakes	1814	Religious	
Barrow Mansion		Jersey City	c. 1835	Private home	Adapted as community center beginning in 1890s
Stratford Quaker Store		Stratford	c. 1840	General Store	Foundation from 1740s, rebuilt circa 1840
Jonathan Pyne House		Cape May	1844	Residence	In Cape May County. 2006 Dendrochronological survey provided date of 1844.
Saint Francis Roman Catholic Church		Trenton	1846	Church	Oldest Roman Catholic church. Catholics became entitled to own property only with the passage of the state's revised constitution in 1840.
Spermacetti Cove Life-saving Station		Sandy Hook; Highlands	1849	Maritime	Last surviving of first federally built by United States Life-Saving Service; Relocated from Fort Hancock to Navesink Twin Lights in 1954
Long-a-Coming Depot		Berlin	1856	Rail station	Oldest railroad station
Ramsey Station		Ramsey	1868	Railroad Station	Oldest passenger station in service
Market St. Firehouse		Morristown	1870	Firehouse	Oldest firehouse in Morris County
Mount Pisgah AME Church		Salem	1871	Church	Oldest African Methodist Episcopal Church
Cobb House		Manalapan	1872	Residence	The current headquarters for Monmouth Battlefield State Park
Chalfonte Hotel		Cape May	1876	Hotel	Oldest continuously operated hotel on the East Coast of the US and contributing property to the Cape May Historic District.
Congregation Adas Emuno		Hoboken	1883	Synagogue	Oldest surviving synagogue building in New Jersey
Weehawken Water Tower		Weehawken	1883	Water tower	Possibly oldest water tower
East Jersey State Prison	East Jersey State Prison	Avenel	1901	Prison	Better known by its original name, Rahway State Prison, oldest operating prison
Firemen's Insurance Company Building		Newark	1910	Skyscraper	The 220 foot (67m) 19 story building is the oldest existing skyscraper is located in the Four Corners Historic District
Max's Diner		Harrison	1927	Restaurant	Oldest diner
Newark Airport Administration Building		Newark	1935	Aviation	First airport terminal in the United States relocated in 2002
Oyster Creek Nuclear Generating Station		Forked River	1969	Nuclear power station	Oldest operating nuclear power station in the United States
Either the Caesars Atlantic City or Bally's Atlantic City		Atlantic City	1979	Gambling Casino	Oldest legal purpose-built gambling casino. (While Resorts Casino Hotel is a year older, it used an existing building for its business, Haddon Hall. Caesar's expanded a pre-existing building for its casino.)
Jersey-Atlantic Wind Farm		Atlantic City	2005	Wind farm	The first coastal wind farm in the United States and New Jersey's first wind farm, consisting of five towers

== See also ==
- List of the oldest buildings in the United States
- National Register of Historic Places listings in New Jersey
- List of Washington's Headquarters during the Revolutionary War
- New Jersey Historic Trust
- Monmouth County Historical Association
- Meadows Foundation (New Jersey)
- New Bridge Landing
- Cranford Historical Preservation Advisory Board
- Raritan Landing
