= Sears, Roebuck and Company Department Store =

Sears, Roebuck and Company Department Store or
Sears Roebuck and Company Mail Order Store or
Sears, Roebuck & Company Mail Order Building or
Sears, Roebuck and Company Warehouse Building or variations may refer to:

in the United States (by state then city)

- Sears, Roebuck & Company Mail Order Building (Los Angeles, California), listed on the NRHP in Boyle Heights, Los Angeles, California
- Sears-Pico, Sears store at Pico and Rimpau, Mid-City, Los Angeles 1930s–1990s
- Sears, Roebuck and Company Department Store (Miami, Florida), listed on the NRHP in Miami-Dade County, Florida
- Sears, Roebuck and Company Complex, Chicago, Illinois, listed on the NRHP in Chicago, Illinois
- Sears Merchandise Building Tower, Chicago, Illinois, listed on the NRHP in Chicago, Illinois
- McCurdy Building (Sears, Roebuck and Company Building), Evansville, Indiana, listed on the NRHP in Vanderburgh County, Indiana
- Sears, Roebuck and Company Store (Louisville, Kentucky), listed on the NRHP in Jefferson County, Kentucky
- Sears Roebuck and Company Mail Order Store (Boston, Massachusetts), also known as Landmark Center, listed on the NRHP in Boston, Massachusetts
- Sears, Roebuck and Company Mail-Order Warehouse and Retail Store, Minneapolis, Minnesota, listed on the NRHP in Hennepin County, Minnesota
- Sears, Roebuck and Company Warehouse Building (North Kansas City, Missouri), listed on the NRHP in Clay County, Missouri
- Sears, Roebuck and Company Retail Department Store-Camden, Camden City, New Jersey, listed on the NRHP in Camden County, New Jersey
- Sears Roebuck & Company Department Store (Brooklyn), Brooklyn, New York
- Starbucks Center, Seattle, Washington, formerly Sears, Roebuck & Co store and warehouse
- Sears, Roebuck Department Store (Spokane, Washington), listed on the NRHP in Spokane County, Washington
- Sears, Roebuck and Company Department Store (Washington, D.C.), listed on the NRHP in Northwest Quadrant, Washington, D.C.
