= Ephraim and Sarah Tomlinson House =

- U.S. National Register of Historic Places
- New Jersey Register of Historic Places
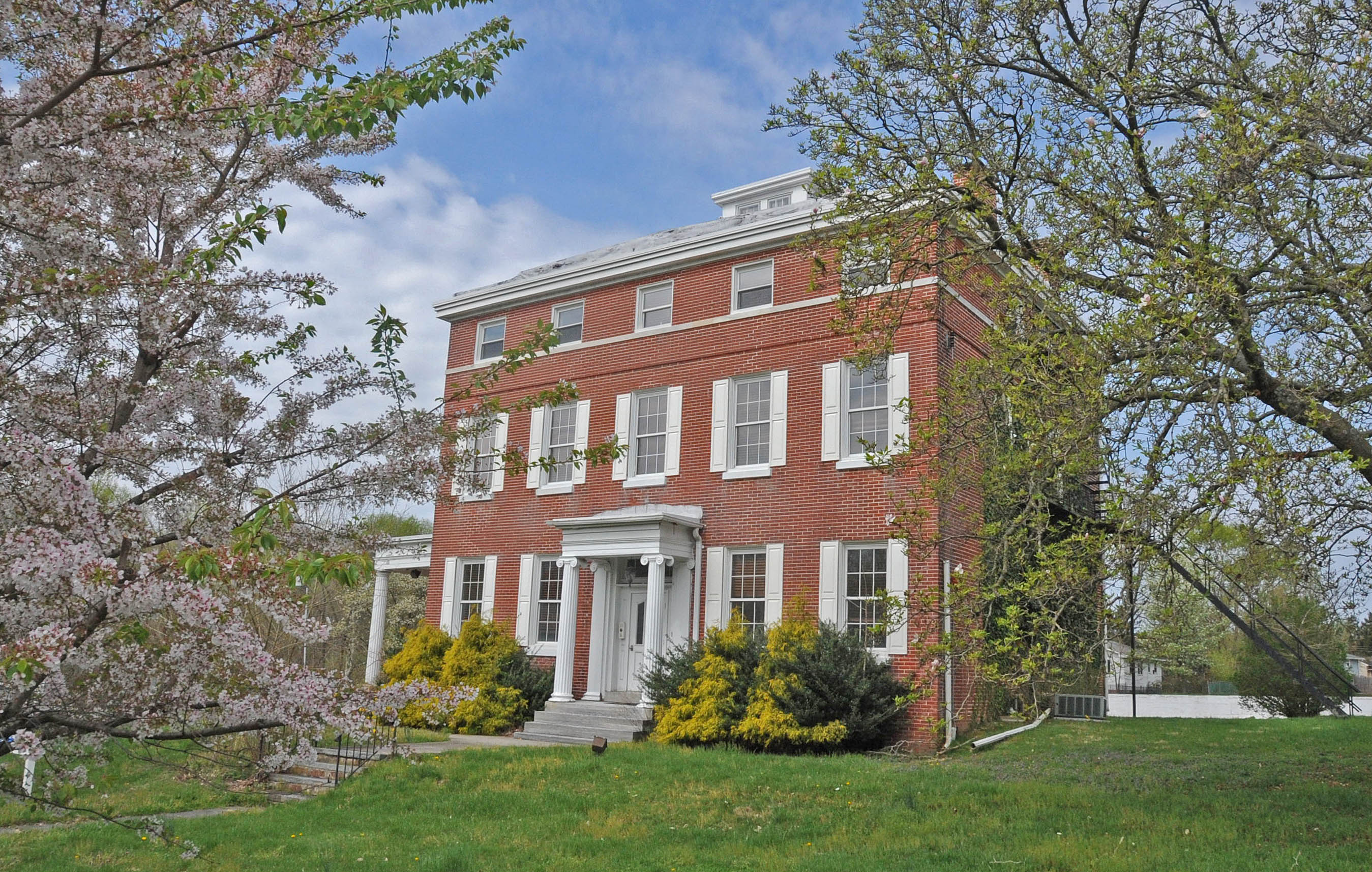

- Location within Camden County, New Jersey Location within New Jersey Location within the United States
- Location: 710 West Laurel Road, Stratford, New Jersey
- Coordinates: 39°49′11.5″N 75°00′54″W
- Built: 1844
- Architectural style: Greek Revival
- NRHP reference No.: 100003592
- NJRHP No.: 5508

Significant dates
- Added to NRHP: April 8, 2019
- Designated NJRHP: February 19, 2019

The Ephraim and Sarah Tomlinson House was located at 710 West Laurel Road in the borough of Stratford in Camden County, New Jersey, United States. The historic Greek Revival house was built in 1844. It was added to the National Register of Historic Places on April 8, 2019, for its significance in architecture. It was demolished in 2022.

== History and description ==
The three story brick house was built in 1844 for Ephraim and Sarah Tomlinson, Quakers who founded a small industrial village, Laurel Mills, the start of Stratford and Laurel Springs. In the 1920s, the house was a maternity hospital. In 1935, it was the Francis Military Academy, later known as the Stratford Military Academy. The Stratford Classical Christian Academy purchased the mansion in 2007, but it closed in 2015.

== See also ==
- National Register of Historic Places listings in Camden County, New Jersey
