= Station Avenue Business District =

Historic district in New Jersey, United States

- U.S. National Register of Historic Places
- U.S. Historic district
- New Jersey Register of Historic Places
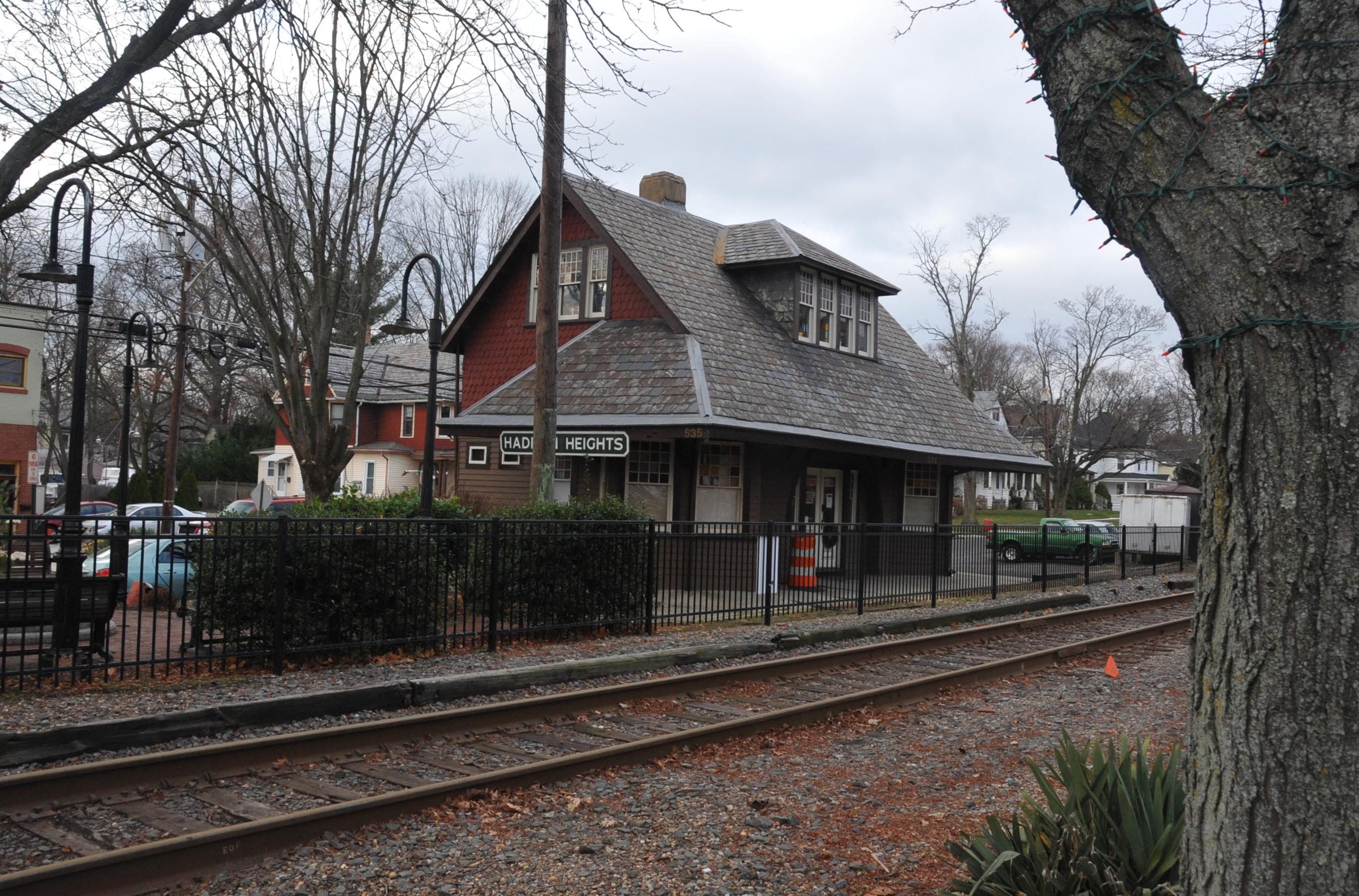
- A train station located in the district.

- Location within Camden County, New Jersey Location within New Jersey Location within the United States
- Location: Station Avenue from 7th Avenue to White Horse Pike, Haddon Heights, New Jersey
- Coordinates: 39.882°N 75.058°W
- Area: 1.9 acres (0.77 ha)
- Built: c.1930
- Architect: Multiple
- Architectural style: Multiple
- NRHP reference No.: 89001945

Significant dates
- Added to NRHP: August 7, 1989
- Designated NJRHP: August 7, 1989

Station Avenue Business District is a historic district located in Haddon Heights, Camden County, New Jersey, United States. The district goes from 8th Avenue to the White Horse Pike, along Station Avenue and was added to the National Register of Historic Places on November 13, 1989.

== See also ==
- National Register of Historic Places listings in Camden County, New Jersey
- Haddon Heights, New Jersey
