= Volney G. Bennett Lumber Company =

- U.S. National Register of Historic Places
- New Jersey Register of Historic Places
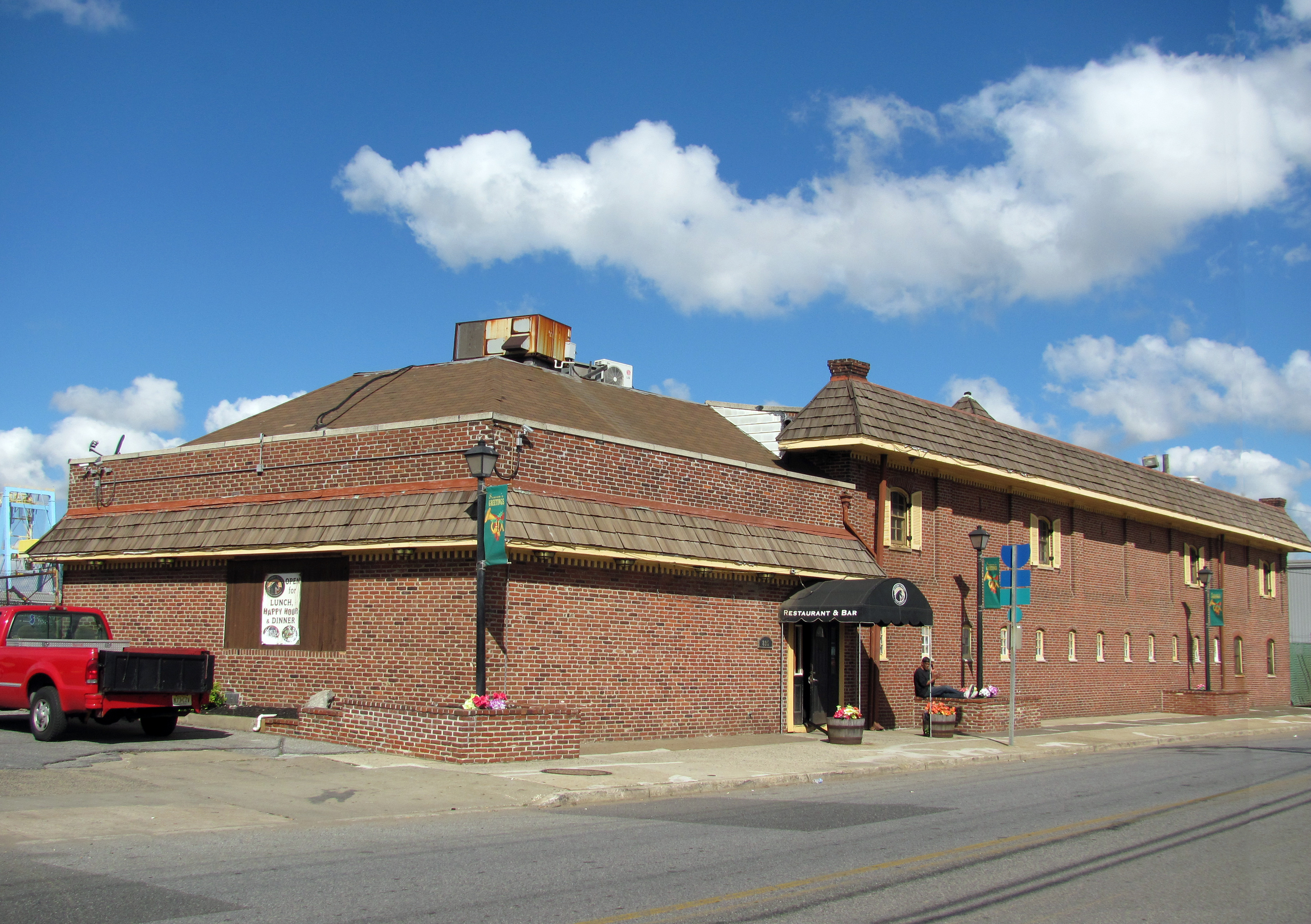
- Volney G. Bennett Lumber Company

- Location within Camden County, New Jersey Location within New Jersey Location within the United States
- Location: 138 Division Street and 845 South Second Street, Camden, New Jersey
- Coordinates: 39°56′5″N 75°7′43″W
- Area: 1.8 acres (0.73 ha)
- Built: 1904
- Architect: Bennett, Volney
- NRHP reference No.: 93000749
- NJRHP No.: 889

Significant dates
- Added to NRHP: August 5, 1993
- Designated NJRHP: June 28, 1993

Volney G. Bennett Lumber Company is located in Camden, Camden County, New Jersey, United States. The building was built in 1904 and was added to the National Register of Historic Places on August 5, 1993.

== See also ==
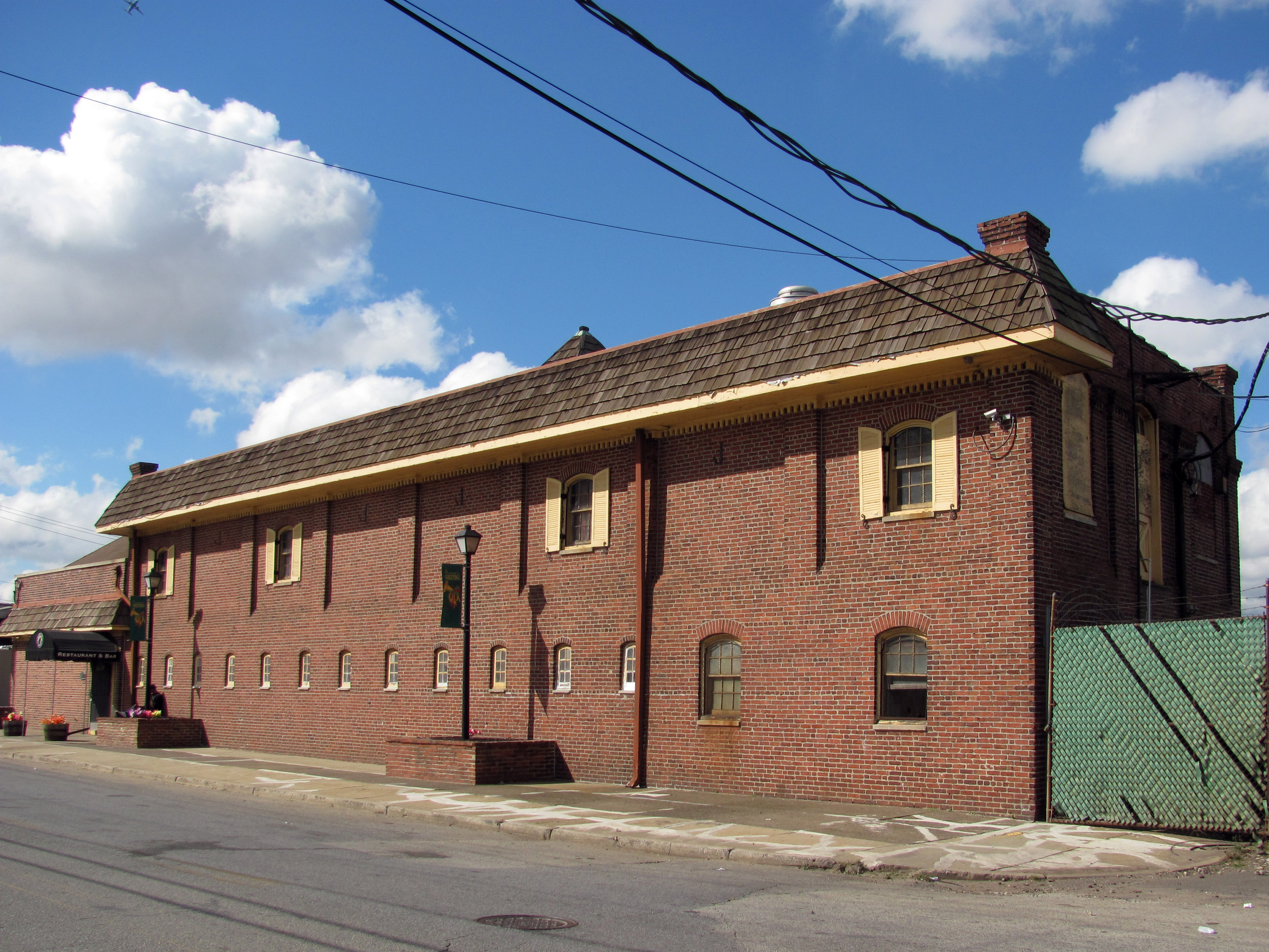

- National Register of Historic Places listings in Camden County, New Jersey
