= Samuel Coles House =

Historic house in New Jersey, United States

- U.S. National Register of Historic Places
- New Jersey Register of Historic Places
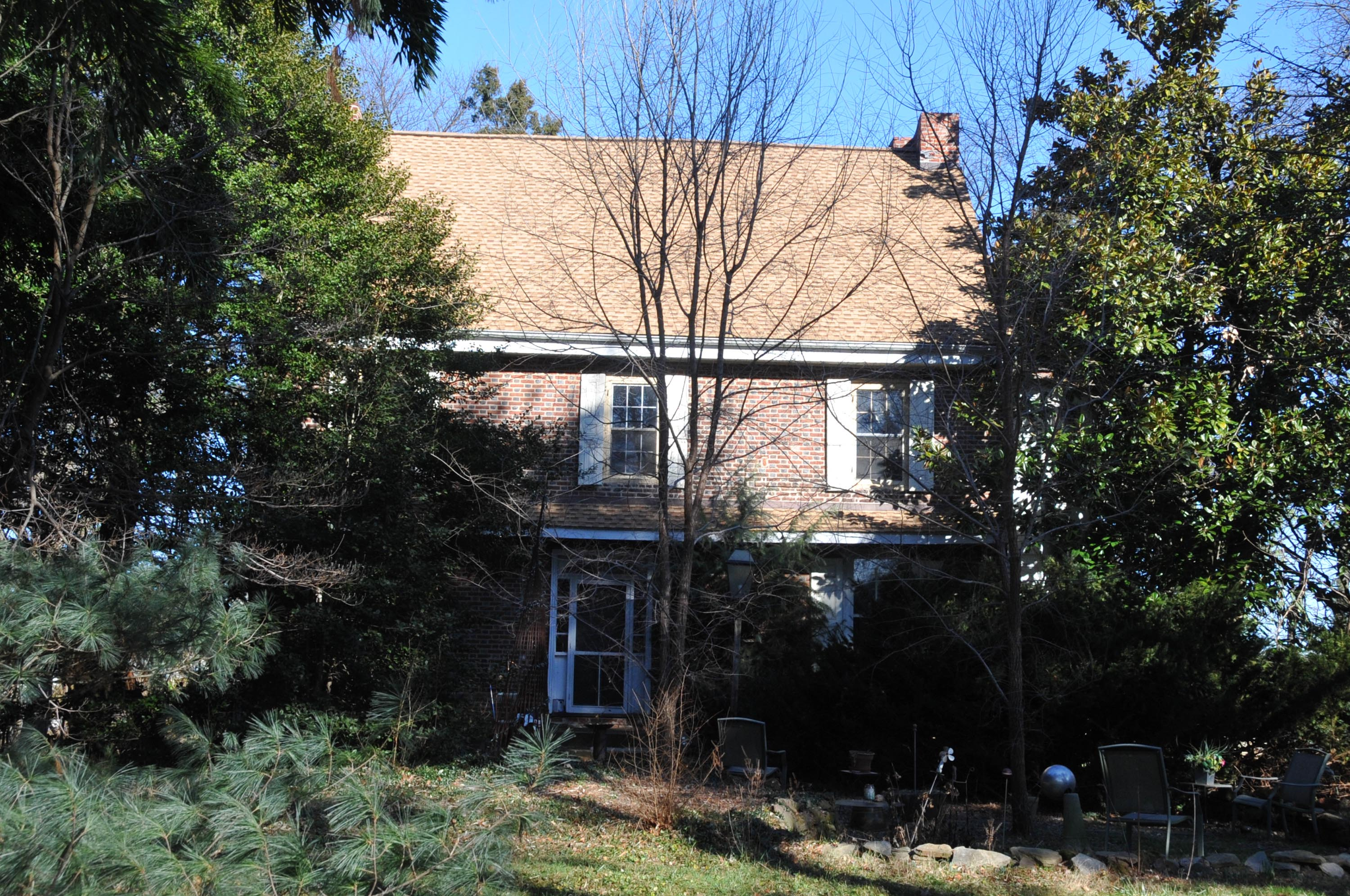

- Location within Camden County, New Jersey Location within New Jersey Location within the United States
- Location: 1881 Old Cuthbert Road, Cherry Hill, New Jersey
- Coordinates: 39°54′49″N 74°58′41″W
- Area: 5.3 acres (2.1 ha)
- Built: 1743
- NRHP reference No.: 73001087
- NJRHP No.: 941

Significant dates
- Added to NRHP: June 18, 1973
- Designated NJRHP: August 7, 1972

Samuel Coles House is located in Cherry Hill, Camden County, New Jersey, United States. The house was built in 1743 and was added to the National Register of Historic Places on June 18, 1973.

== See also ==
- National Register of Historic Places listings in Camden County, New Jersey
