= Stokes–Lee House =

Historic house in New Jersey, United States

- U.S. National Register of Historic Places
- New Jersey Register of Historic Places
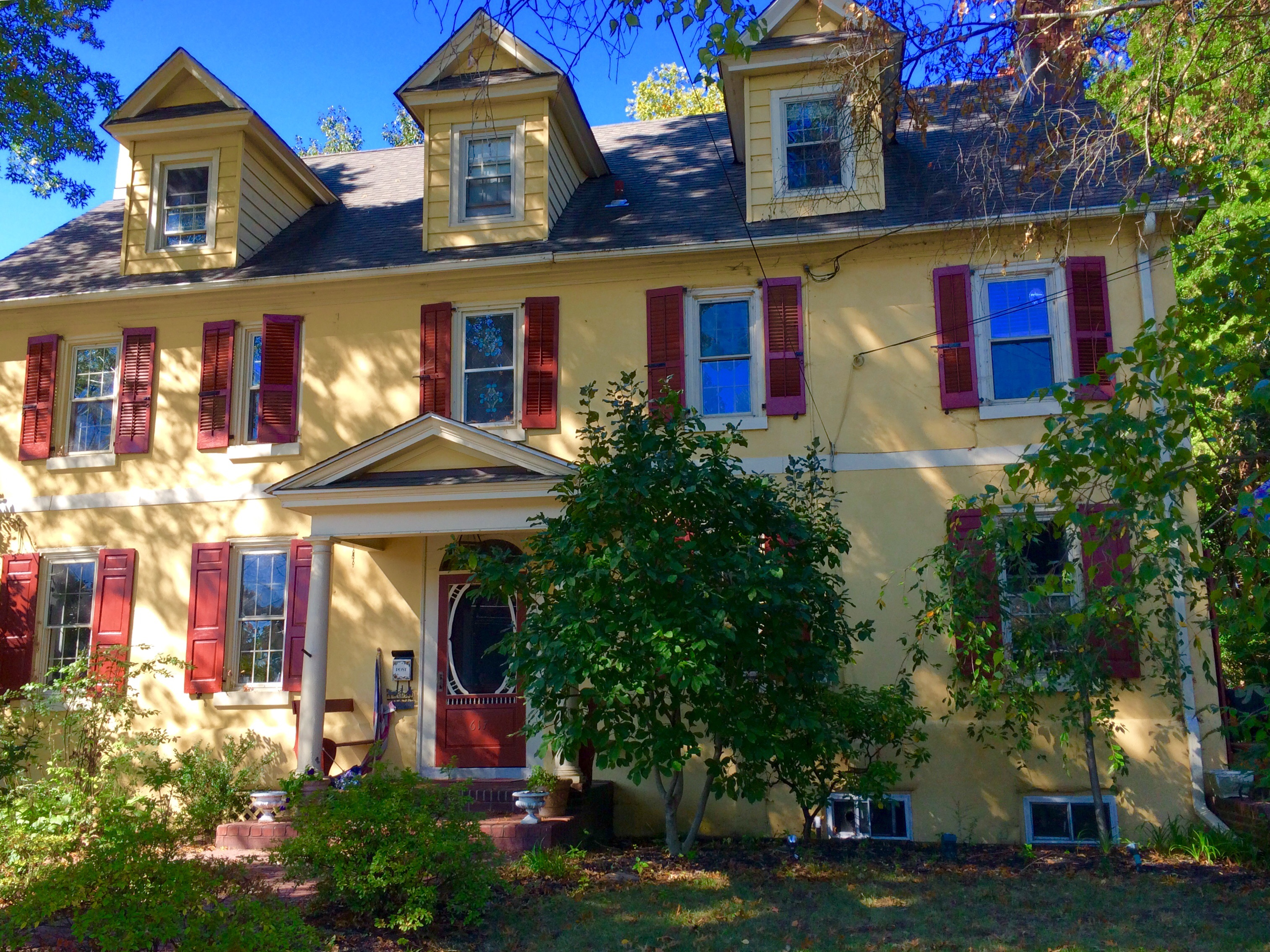

- Location within Camden County, New Jersey Location within New Jersey Location within the United States
- Location: 615–617 Lee's Avenue, Collingswood, New Jersey
- Coordinates: 39°54′31″N 75°4′12″W
- Built: c. 1700–1717; 1761
- Built by: Isaac Hollingham II; Jacob Stokes
- Architectural style: Georgian
- NRHP reference No.: 87001519
- NJRHP No.: 951

Significant dates
- Added to NRHP: September 10, 1987
- Designated NJRHP: July 27, 1987

The Stokes–Lee House is located at 615–617 Lee's Avenue in the borough of Collingswood in Camden County, New Jersey, United States. The historic brick house was added to the National Register of Historic Places on September 10, 1987, for its significance in agriculture, architecture, and exploration/settlement.

In 1693, Isaac Hollingham bought 404 acres (163 ha) from Robert Turner. After his death, his son, Isaac Hollingham II, inherited the property and built the northern part of the house from between 1700 and 1717. Sarah Bates Ellis purchased it in 1717. Her son, Joseph Ellis, farmed the land until his death in 1757. His son-in-law, Jacob Stokes, owned the property in 1761 and enlarged the house by adding the southern part that year. It remained in the Stokes family until 1828, when it was sold to George Lee.

== See also ==
- National Register of Historic Places listings in Camden County, New Jersey
