= Samuel Mickle House =

Historic house in New Jersey, United States

- U.S. National Register of Historic Places
- New Jersey Register of Historic Places
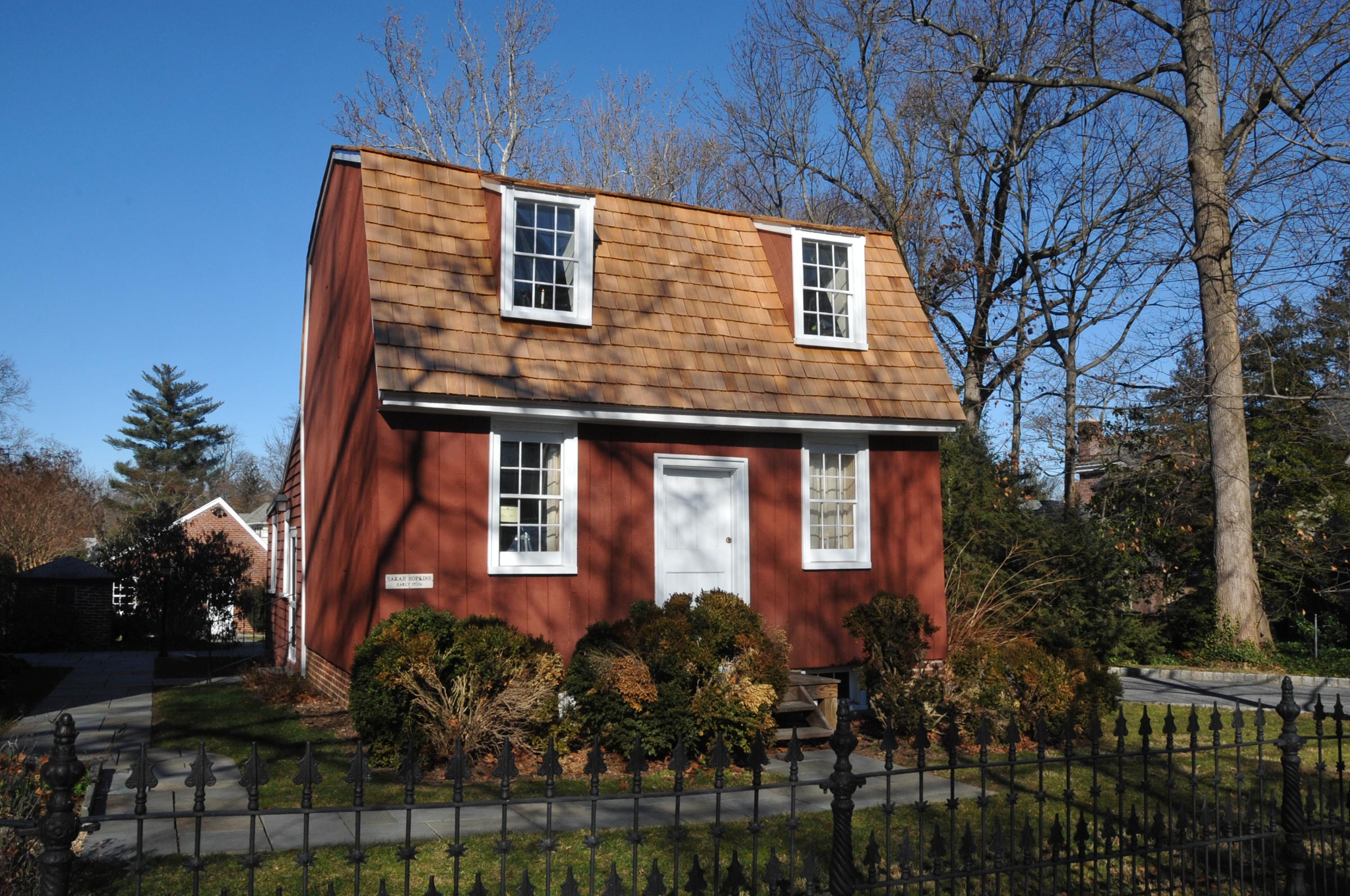

- Location within Camden County, New Jersey Location within New Jersey Location within the United States
- Location: 343 Kings Highway, East, Haddonfield, New Jersey
- Coordinates: 39°54′2.6″N 75°1′38.4″W
- Built: c. 1736
- NRHP reference No.: 75001129
- NJRHP No.: 975

Significant dates
- Added to NRHP: May 21, 1975
- Designated NJRHP: September 6, 1973

Samuel Mickle House, also known as the Hip Roof House, is located at 345 Kings Highway, East, in the borough of Haddonfield in Camden County, New Jersey, United States. The house was built about 1736 and was documented by the Historic American Buildings Survey (HABS) in 1936. The house was added to the National Register of Historic Places on May 21, 1975, for its significance in architecture.

== History and description ==
The one and one-half gambrel roof house built by Samuel Mickle was originally located at the northeast corner of King's Road and Tanner's Lane. By 1820, it was located at 227 Kings Highway. In 1836, it was moved to 23 Ellis Street. In 1965, the Historical Society of Haddonfield moved the house to its current location and now uses it as a library. According to the nomination form, it is thought to be the oldest house in the borough.

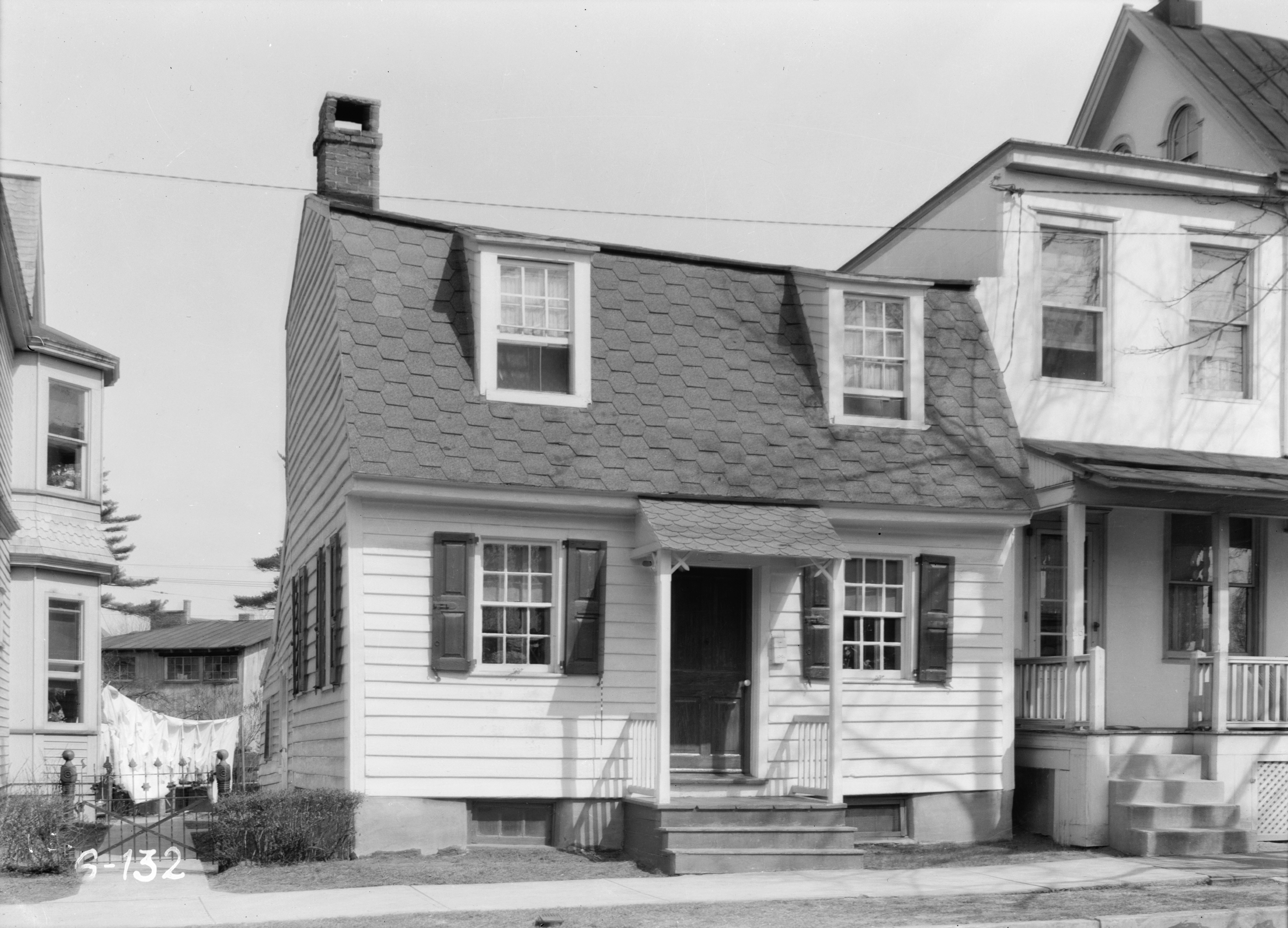
HABS photo from 1936

== See also ==
- National Register of Historic Places listings in Camden County, New Jersey
- List of the oldest buildings in New Jersey
