= A. S. Woodruff and Law Buildings =

Historic building in New Jersey, United States

- U.S. National Register of Historic Places
- New Jersey Register of Historic Places
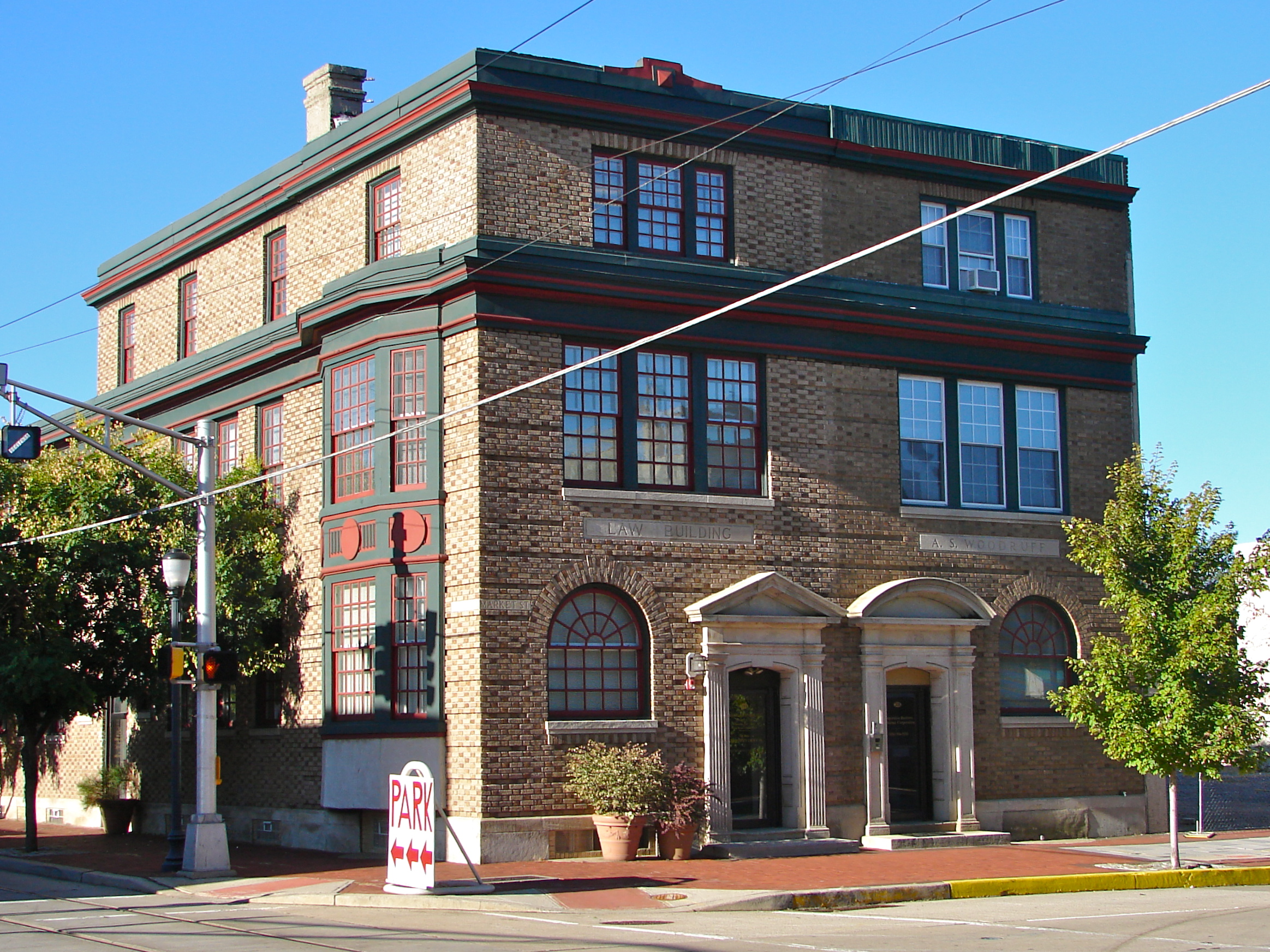

- Location within Camden County, New Jersey Location within New Jersey Location within the United States
- Location: 328-330 Market Street, Camden, New Jersey
- Coordinates: 39°56′45″N 75°7′23″W
- Area: less than one acre
- Built: 1920
- Architect: Peddle, Charles; Draper, James W.
- Architectural style: Colonial Revival, Georgian Revival
- MPS: Banks, Insurance, and Legal Buildings in Camden, New Jersey, 1873-1938 MPS
- NRHP reference No.: 90001264
- NJRHP No.: 937

Significant dates
- Added to NRHP: August 24, 1990
- Designated NJRHP: January 11, 1990

A. S. Woodruff and Law Buildings is located in Camden, Camden County, New Jersey, United States. The building was built in 1920 and was added to the National Register of Historic Places on August 24, 1990.

== See also ==
- National Register of Historic Places listings in Camden County, New Jersey
