= National State Bank (Camden, New Jersey) =

- U.S. National Register of Historic Places
- New Jersey Register of Historic Places
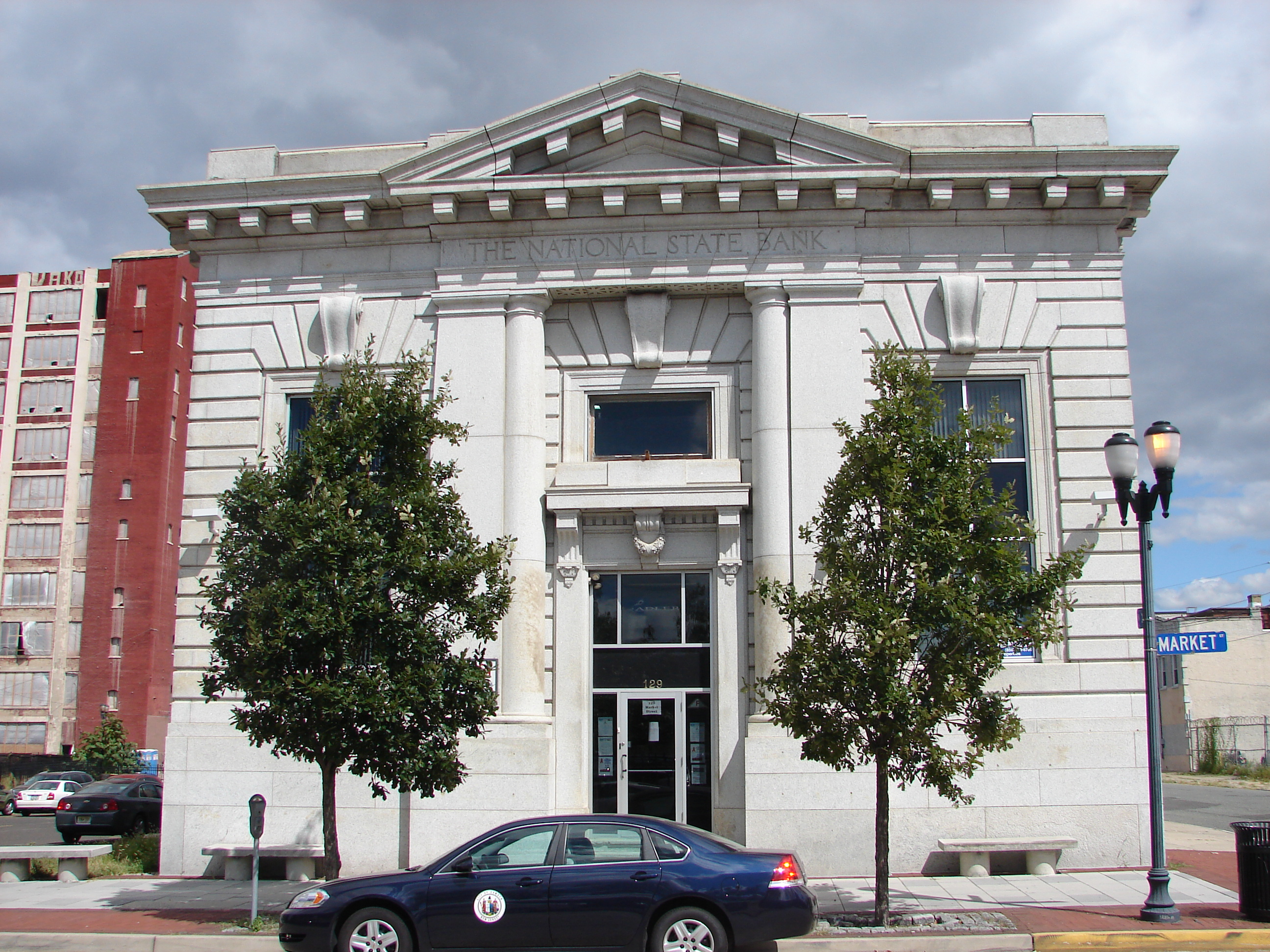

- Location within Camden County, New Jersey Location within New Jersey Location within the United States
- Location: 123 Market Street; Camden, New Jersey
- Coordinates: 39°56′47″N 75°7′34″W
- Built: 1913
- Architect: Davis & Davis
- Architectural style: Classical Revival
- MPS: Banks, Insurance, and Legal Buildings in Camden, New Jersey, 1873-1938 MPS
- NRHP reference No.: 90001267
- NJRHP No.: 916

Significant dates
- Added to NRHP: August 24, 1990
- Designated NJRHP: January 11, 1990

The National State Bank is located at 123 Market Street in the city of Camden in Camden County, New Jersey, United States. The building was built in 1913 and was added to the National Register of Historic Places on August 24, 1990, for its significance in architecture and economics. The bank is part of the Banks, Insurance, and Legal Buildings in Camden, New Jersey, 1873–1938 Multiple Property Submission (MPS).

== History and description ==
The one-story building was designed by the firm Davis & Davis and features Neoclassical Revival architecture with a rusticated granite exterior. Marble and brass are featured in the interior.

In February 2017 the building became home to "City Invincible" an architecture, urban design and tech start-up firm after extensive renovation.

== See also ==
- 1913 in architecture
- National Register of Historic Places listings in Camden County, New Jersey
