= Camden Safe Deposit & Trust Company =

- U.S. National Register of Historic Places
- New Jersey Register of Historic Places
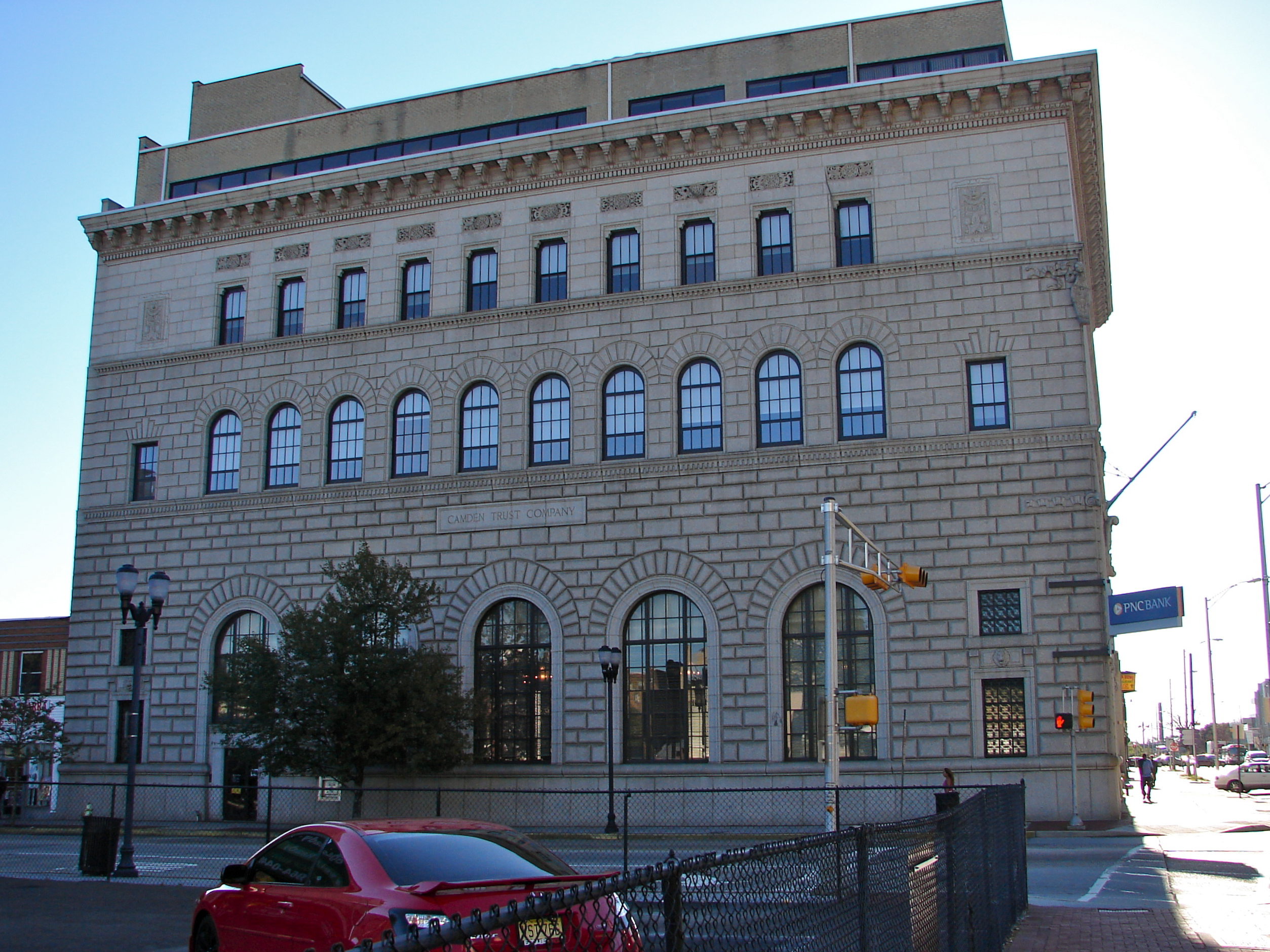

- Location within Camden County, New Jersey Location within New Jersey Location within the United States
- Location: Market Street and Broadway, Camden, New Jersey
- Coordinates: 39°56′43.9″N 75°7′6.5″W
- Built: 1929
- Built by: Ketcham & McQuade
- Architect: Rankin & Kellogg
- Architectural style: Late 19th And 20th Century Revivals, Second Renaissance Revival
- MPS: Banks, Insurance, and Legal Buildings in Camden, New Jersey, 1873-1938 MPS
- NRHP reference No.: 90001258
- NJRHP No.: 895

Significant dates
- Added to NRHP: August 22, 1990
- Designated NJRHP: January 11, 1990

The Camden Safe Deposit & Trust Company is located at the northeast corner of Market Street and Broadway in the city of Camden in Camden County, New Jersey, United States. The building was built in 1929 and was added to the National Register of Historic Places on August 22, 1990, for its significance in architecture and economics. The bank is part of the Banks, Insurance, and Legal Buildings in Camden, New Jersey, 1873–1938 Multiple Property Submission (MPS).

== History and description ==
Patterned after the Riccardi Palace in Florence, Italy, the four-story building rises directly from the side walk on the northeast corner of Market Street and Broadway. The first and second levels on the Market and Broadway facades have a rusticated finish. An addition was added to the roof in the 1950s. The Diocesan Center of the Roman Catholic Diocese of Camden is located in the building.

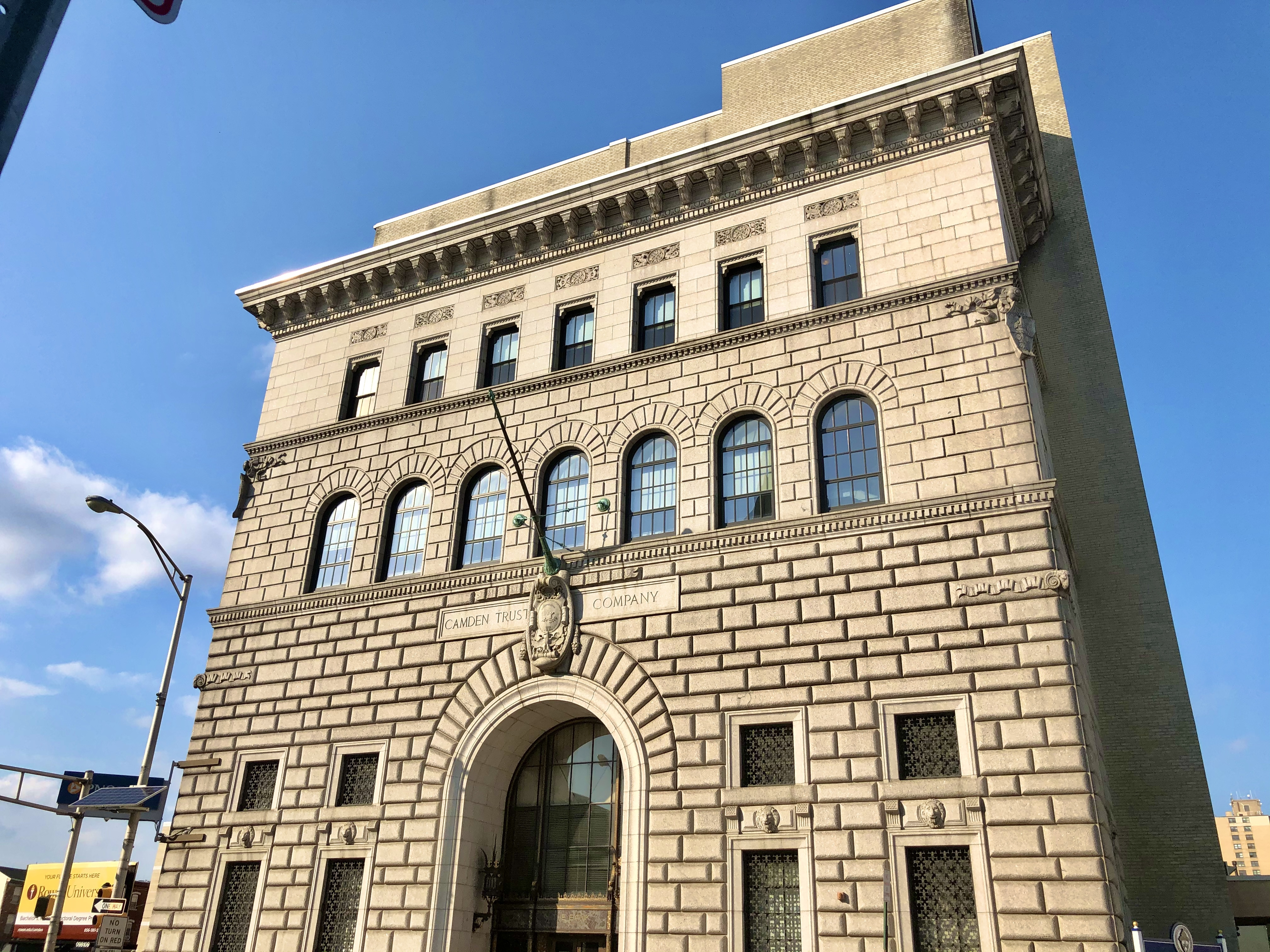
Entrance on Market Street

== See also ==
- National Register of Historic Places listings in Camden County, New Jersey
