= Burrough–Dover House =

Historic house in Camden County, New Jersey

- U.S. National Register of Historic Places
- New Jersey Register of Historic Places
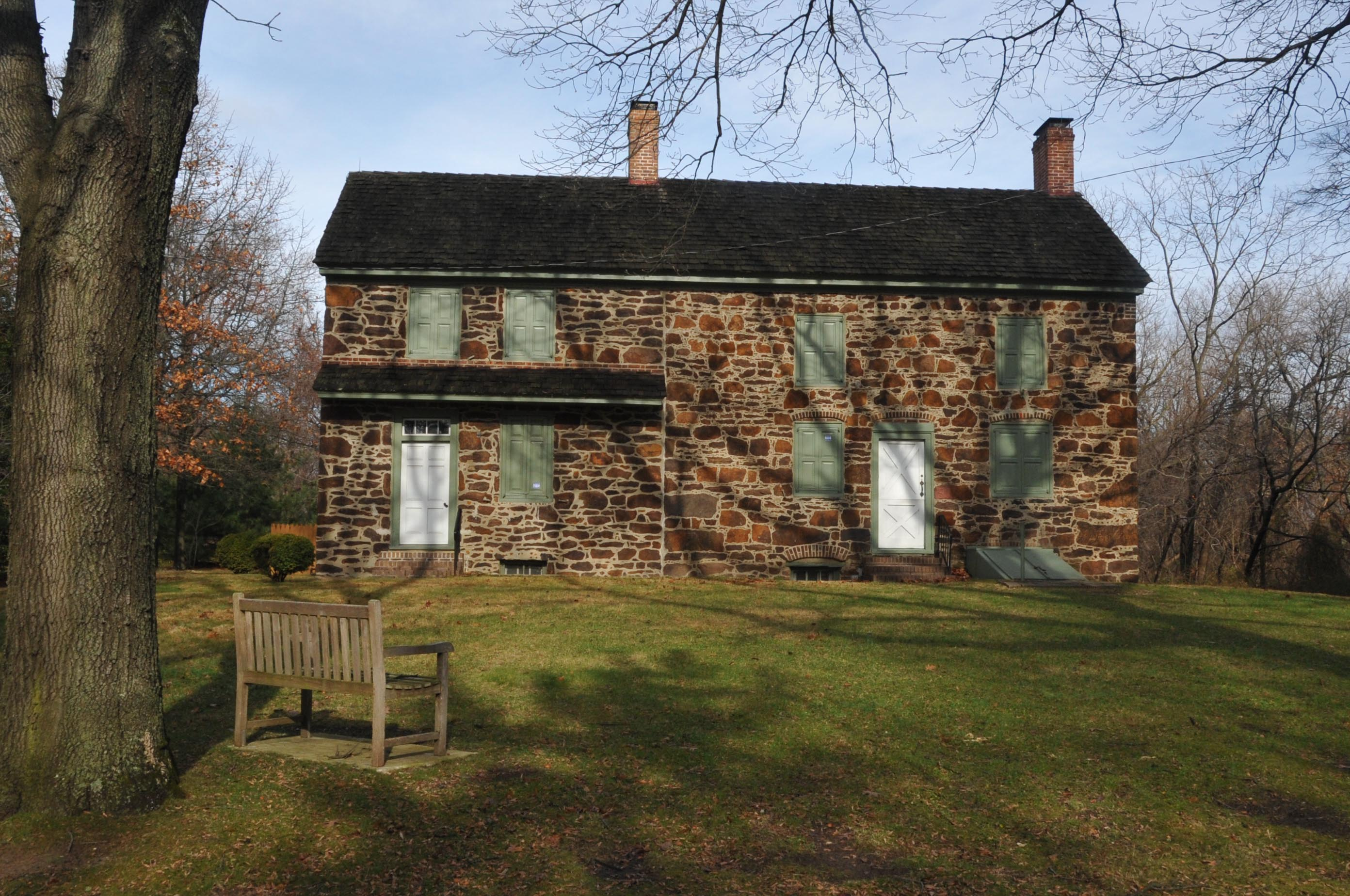

- Location within Camden County, New Jersey Location within New Jersey Location within the United States
- Location: Near Haddonfield Road, Pennsauken Township, New Jersey
- Coordinates: 39°58′24″N 75°1′5″W
- Built: 1710, 1793
- NRHP reference No.: 73001089
- NJRHP No.: 982

Significant dates
- Added to NRHP: October 25, 1973
- Designated NJRHP: June 15, 1973

The Burrough–Dover House, also known as the Burrough–Dover Farmhouse, is located in Pennsauken Township of Camden County, New Jersey, United States. The historic stone house was added to the National Register of Historic Places on October 25, 1973, for its significance in exploration/settlement. Restoration work on the house has been performed by the Pennsauken Historical Society.

According to the nomination form, the house was built in 1710 by a member of the Burrough family, one of earliest settlers in the area. Thomas Burrough expanded the house in 1793. Daniel Brooks bought it in 1834. The Dover family purchased the property in 1838 and lived here until 1960. The county then took control and gave it to the Pennsauken Historical Society.

== See also ==
- National Register of Historic Places listings in Camden County, New Jersey
- List of the oldest buildings in New Jersey
