= Newton Friends' Meetinghouse =

Historic church in New Jersey, United States

- U.S. National Register of Historic Places
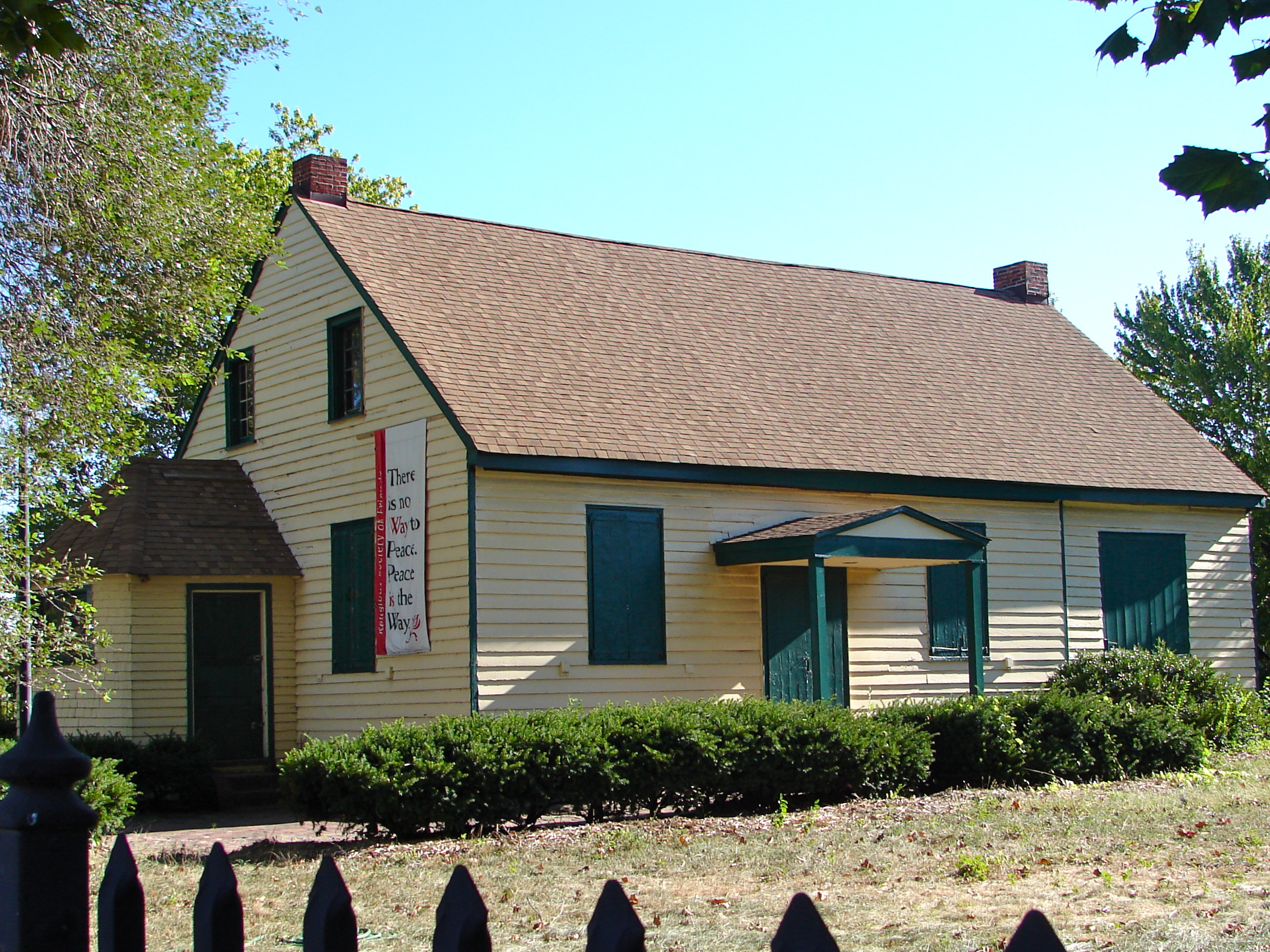

- Location within Camden County, New Jersey Location within New Jersey Location within the United States
- Location: 722 Cooper Street, Camden, New Jersey
- Coordinates: 39°56′45″N 75°7′1″W
- Area: 0.5 acres (0.20 ha)
- Built: 1824
- Architectural style: Queene Anne Revival
- NRHP reference No.: 71000498
- Added to NRHP: August 12, 1971

Newton Friends' Meetinghouse is the home of an active meeting of the Religious Society of Friends, who meet in a historic Quaker meeting house at 808 Cooper Street in Camden, Camden County, New Jersey, United States.

It was built in 1824 as an extremely simple "Quaker clapboard" structure in the typically subdued style of Friends meeting houses. It was remodeled in 1885 by architect Wilson Eyre Jr. in the sometimes-extravagant Queen Anne Revival style, though this expression of the style is still very subdued. The meetinghouse was added to the National Register of Historic Places in 1971.

== See also ==
- National Register of Historic Places listings in Camden County, New Jersey
