= Marcouse Building =

- U.S. National Register of Historic Places
- New Jersey Register of Historic Places
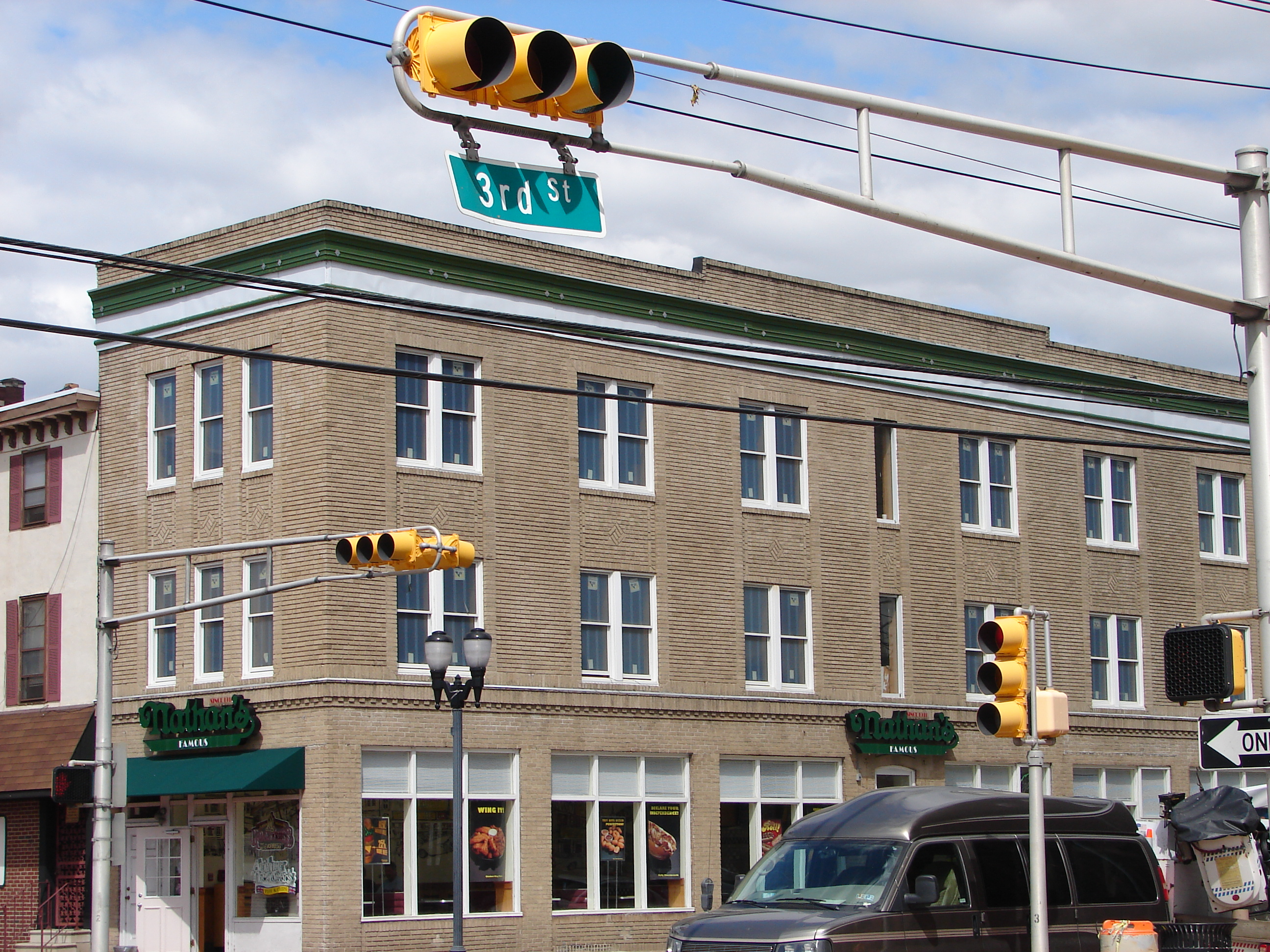

- Location within Camden County, New Jersey Location within New Jersey Location within the United States
- Location: 231 Market Street, Camden, New Jersey
- Coordinates: 39°56′47″N 75°7′28″W
- Area: less than one acre
- Built: 1924
- Architect: Wrifford, William
- Architectural style: Classical Revival
- MPS: Banks, Insurance, and Legal Buildings in Camden, New Jersey, 1873-1938 MPS
- NRHP reference No.: 90001266
- NJRHP No.: 914

Significant dates
- Added to NRHP: August 24, 1990
- Designated NJRHP: January 11, 1990

Marcouse Building is located in Camden, Camden County, New Jersey, United States. The building was built in 1924 and was added to the National Register of Historic Places on August 24, 1990.

== See also ==
- National Register of Historic Places listings in Camden County, New Jersey
