= Grant A.M.E. Church =

Historic church in New Jersey, United States

- U.S. National Register of Historic Places
- New Jersey Register of Historic Places
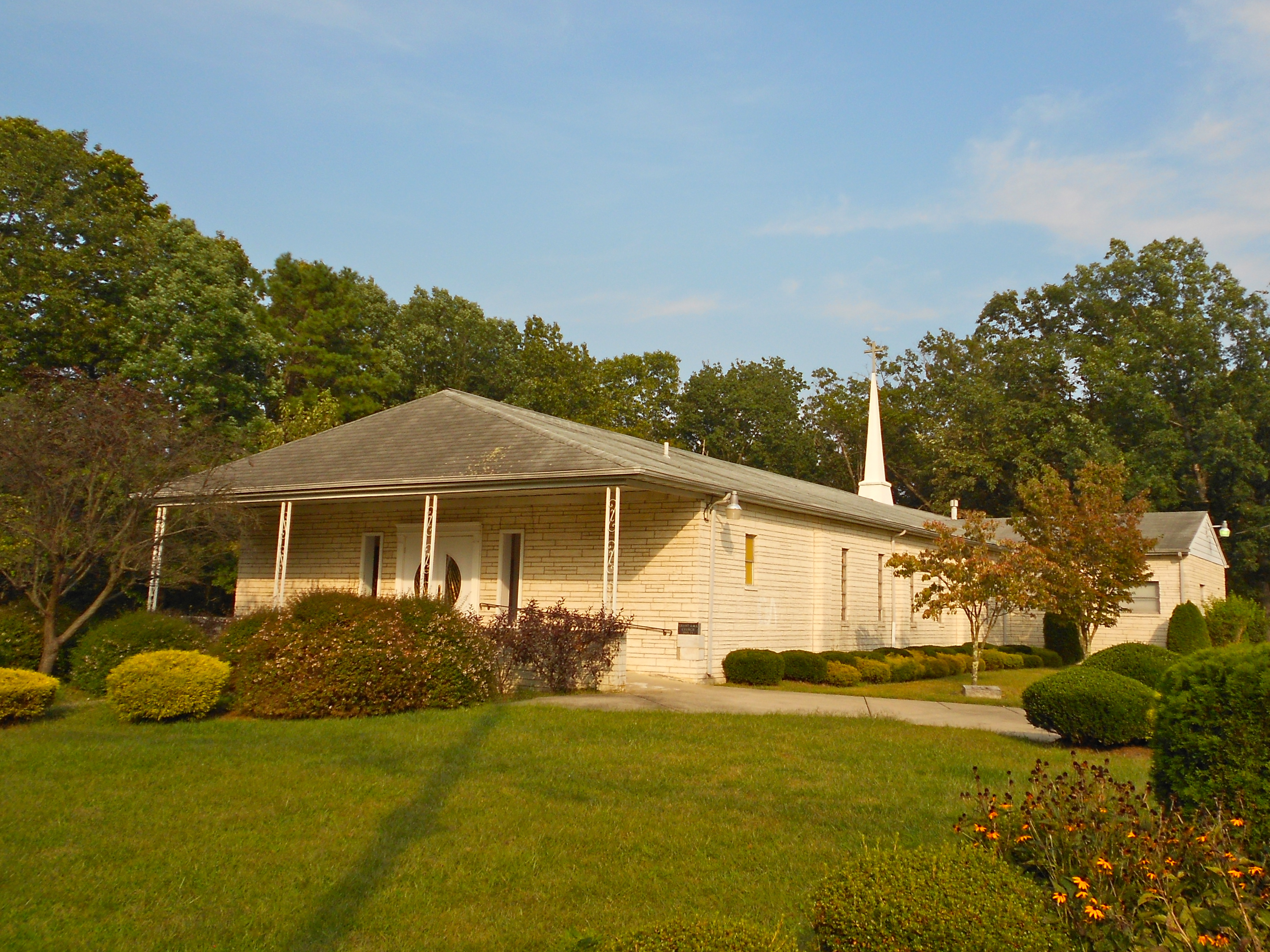
- New church

- Location within Camden County, New Jersey Location within New Jersey Location within the United States
- Location: 4th and Washington Streets, Chesilhurst, New Jersey
- Coordinates: 39°44′6″N 74°52′46″W
- Built: 1896
- NRHP reference No.: 77000857
- NJRHP No.: 945

Significant dates
- Added to NRHP: October 5, 1977
- Designated NJRHP: December 27, 1976

The Grant A.M.E. Church was a historic church at 4th and Washington Street in Chesilhurst of Camden County, New Jersey, United States.

It was built in 1896 and added to the National Register of Historic Places on October 5, 1977, for its significance in religion and social history.

== History and description ==
The Grant AME Church is probably the oldest building in Chesilhurst, a predominantly black community. As the town grew, the Grant Church served as the focal point for religious life for local blacks. Named for Bishop Abraham Grant, the Grant AME Church, was conceived by Margaret Wilson, evangelist and member of the Might Women’s Missionary Society in 1896. She was aided by 10 or 12 other citizens of Chesilhurst. Lots were purchased at 4th and Washington, ground was broken, and the cornerstone laid in 1897. Previously, services were held in private homes.

The church became a focal point in the community and surrounding areas. In 1936, additions were made to the original structure to meet the requirements of a growing congregation. In 1974, a new church was erected on a site next to the original church. The original church was demolished c. 1980.

== See also ==
- National Register of Historic Places listings in Camden County, New Jersey
