= Building at 525 Cooper Street =

- U.S. National Register of Historic Places
- New Jersey Register of Historic Places
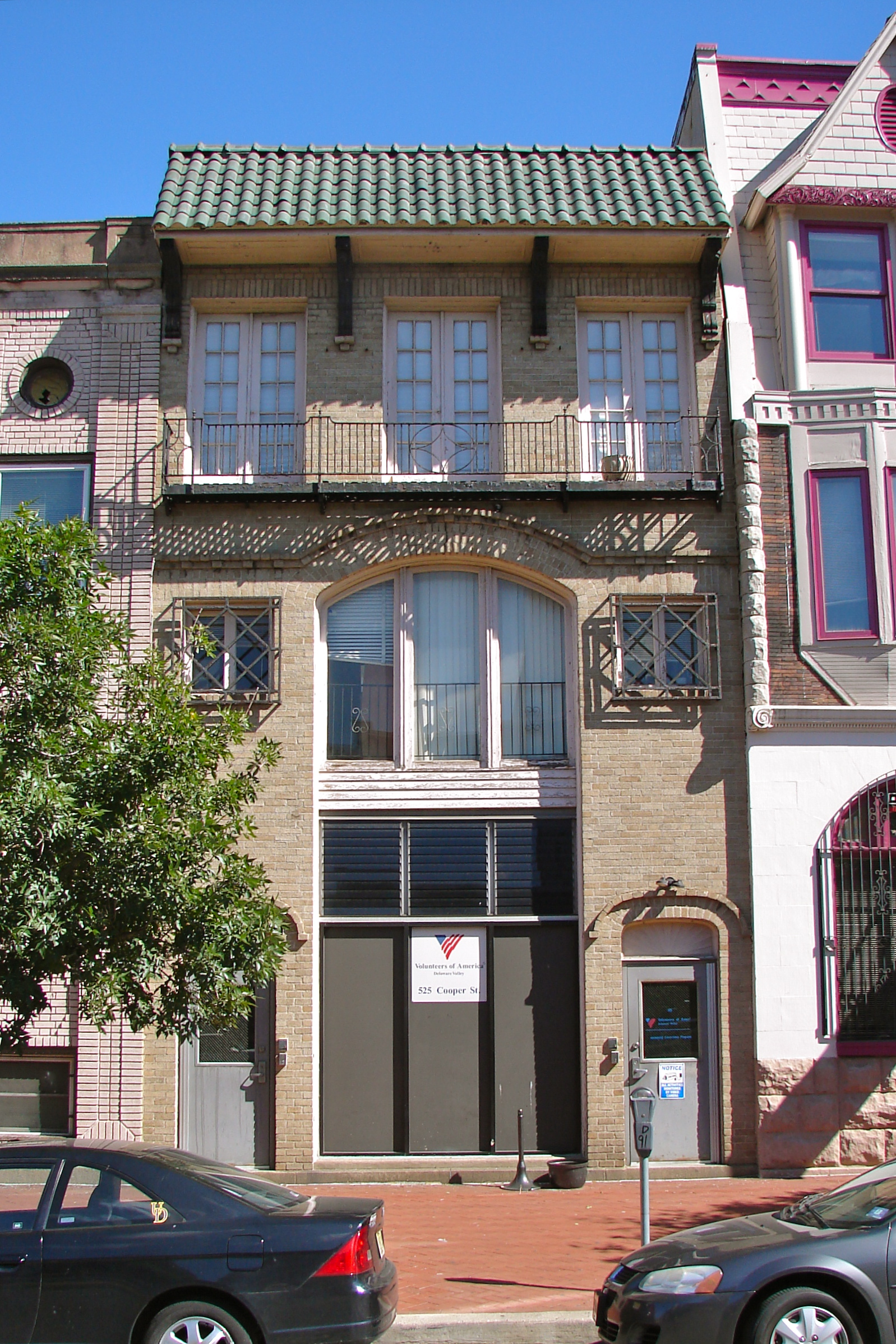

- Location within Camden County, New Jersey Location within New Jersey Location within the United States
- Location: 525 Cooper Street, Camden, New Jersey
- Coordinates: 39°56′49″N 75°07′11″W
- Built: 1925
- Architectural style: Mission/Spanish Revival
- MPS: Banks, Insurance, and Legal Buildings in Camden, New Jersey, 1873-1938 MPS
- NRHP reference No.: 90001286
- NJRHP No.: 891

Significant dates
- Added to NRHP: August 24, 1990
- Designated NJRHP: January 11, 1990

The building at 525 Cooper Street, also known as the Charles S. Boyer Building, is a professional building in the city of Camden in Camden County, New Jersey, United States. The historic brick building was built in 1925 and was added to the National Register of Historic Places on August 24, 1990, for its significance in architecture and law. The building is part of the Banks, Insurance, and Legal Buildings in Camden, New Jersey, 1873–1938, Multiple Property Submission (MPS).

The three-story building was built with tan bricks and features Mission Revival architecture. The site was originally a rowhouse where Charles S. Boyer lived. According to the nomination form, it was part of the expansion of the legal profession and the insurance industry in the city in the 1920s.

== See also ==
- National Register of Historic Places listings in Camden County, New Jersey
