= Griffith Morgan House =

Historic house in New Jersey, United States

- U.S. National Register of Historic Places
- New Jersey Register of Historic Places

- Location within Camden County, New Jersey Location within New Jersey Location within the United States
- Nearest city: Pennsauken Township, New Jersey
- Coordinates: 39.99039°N 75.04829°W
- Area: 0 acres (0 ha)
- Built: 1693
- NRHP reference No.: 73001088
- NJRHP No.: 983

Significant dates
- Added to NRHP: January 25, 1973
- Designated NJRHP: May 12, 1972

Griffith Morgan House is located in Pennsauken Township, Camden County, New Jersey, United States. The house was built in 1693 and added to the National Register of Historic Places on January 25, 1973.

== See also ==
- National Register of Historic Places listings in Camden County, New Jersey
- List of the oldest buildings in New Jersey
- Joseph Cooper House
