= Gloucester City Water Works Engine House =

- U.S. National Register of Historic Places
- New Jersey Register of Historic Places
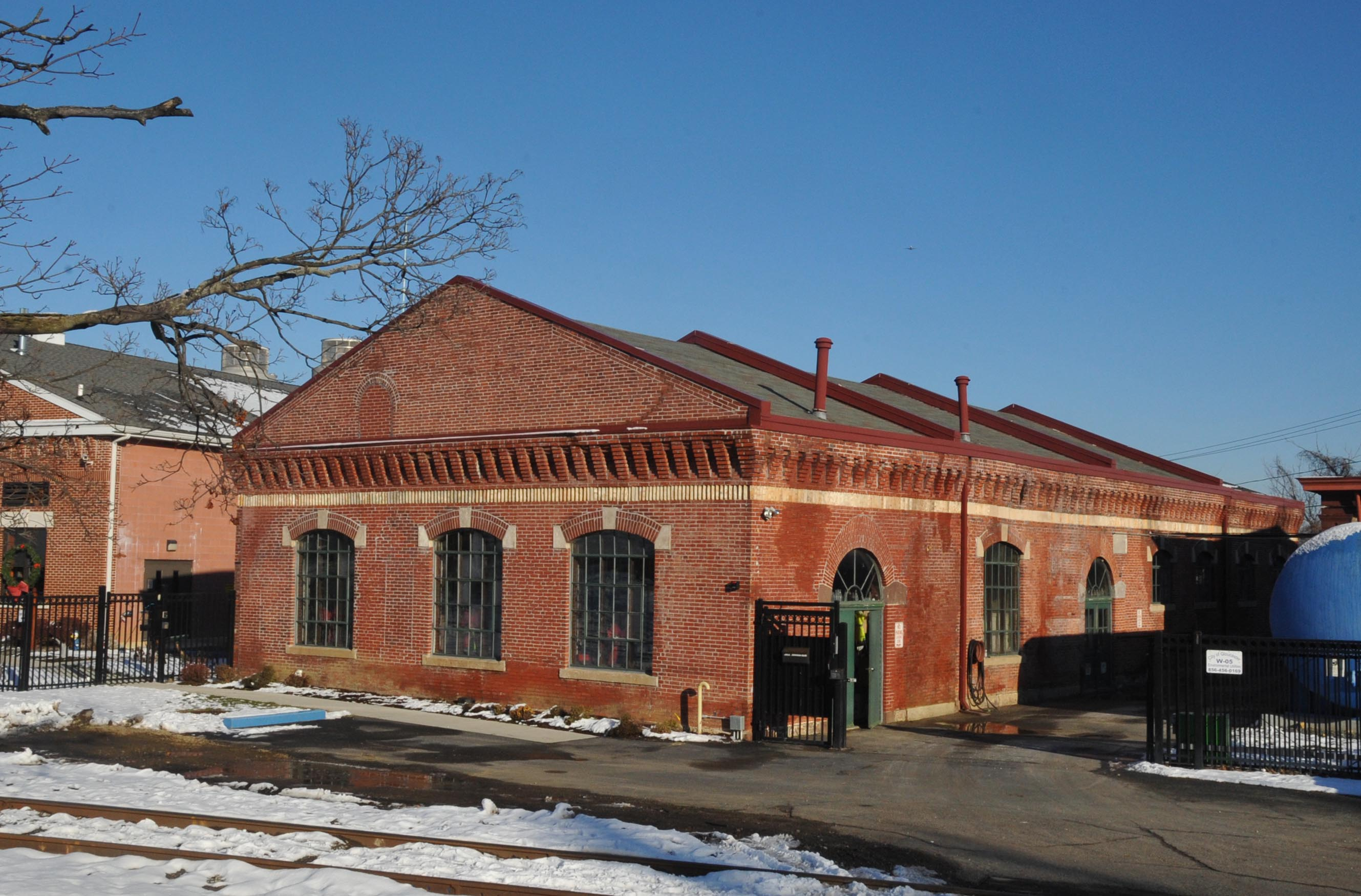

- Location within Camden County, New Jersey Location within New Jersey Location within the United States
- Location: Junction of Johnson Boulevard and Gaunt Street, Gloucester City, New Jersey
- Coordinates: 39°53′47″N 75°6′53″W
- Area: 0.1 acres (0.040 ha)
- Built: 1883
- Architect: Yocum, Jacob; Birkenbine, Henry P.M., et l.
- NRHP reference No.: 98000235
- NJRHP No.: 2686

Significant dates
- Added to NRHP: March 30, 1998
- Designated NJRHP: February 2, 1998

Gloucester City Water Works Engine House is located in Gloucester City, Camden County, New Jersey, United States. The building was built in 1883 and was added to the National Register of Historic Places on March 30, 1998.

== See also ==
- National Register of Historic Places listings in Camden County, New Jersey
