= Broadway Trust Company =

- U.S. National Register of Historic Places
- New Jersey Register of Historic Places
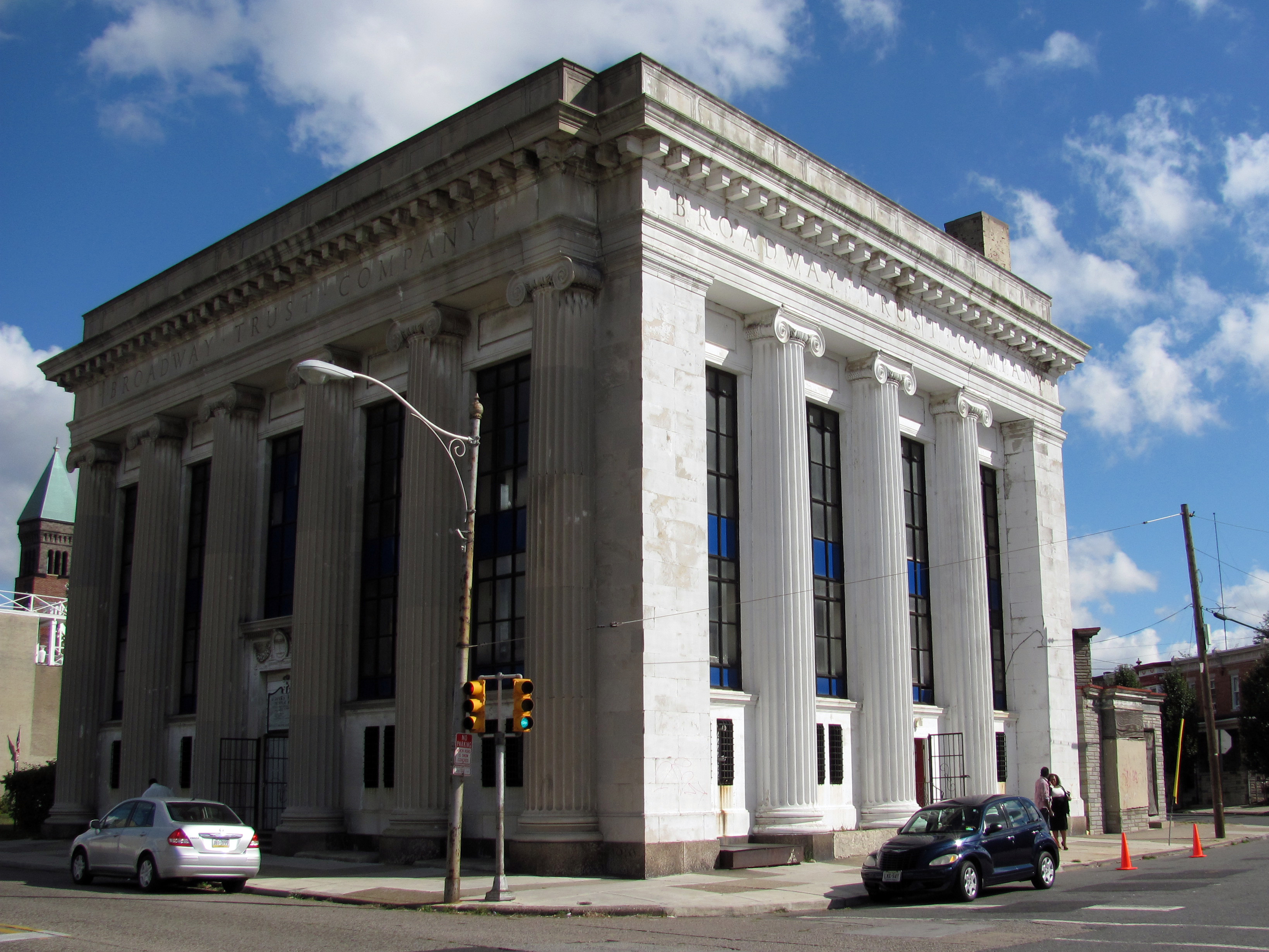

- Location within Camden County, New Jersey Location within New Jersey Location within the United States
- Location: 938–944 Broadway, Camden, New Jersey
- Coordinates: 39°56′2.2″N 75°07′9.2″W
- Built: 1920
- Built by: J. Henry Miller
- Architect: Phillip Merz
- Architectural style: Classical Revival
- MPS: Banks, Insurance, and Legal Buildings in Camden, New Jersey, 1873-1938 MPS
- NRHP reference No.: 90001284
- NJRHP No.: 892

Significant dates
- Added to NRHP: August 24, 1990
- Designated NJRHP: January 11, 1990

The Broadway Trust Company building is located at 938–944 Broadway in the city of Camden in Camden County, New Jersey, United States. The limestone Classical Revival building was built in 1920 and was added to the National Register of Historic Places on August 24, 1990, for its significance in architecture and economics. The bank is part of the Banks, Insurance, and Legal Buildings in Camden, New Jersey, 1873–1938 Multiple Property Submission (MPS).

The Broadway Trust Company was founded in 1909. The building was designed by the architect Phillip Merz in a Neoclassical style and features six Ionic columns facing Broadway. It is no longer used as a bank and is now the St. James Apostolic Temple.

== See also ==
- National Register of Historic Places listings in Camden County, New Jersey
