= Inter-County Mortgage and Finance Company =

- U.S. National Register of Historic Places
- New Jersey Register of Historic Places
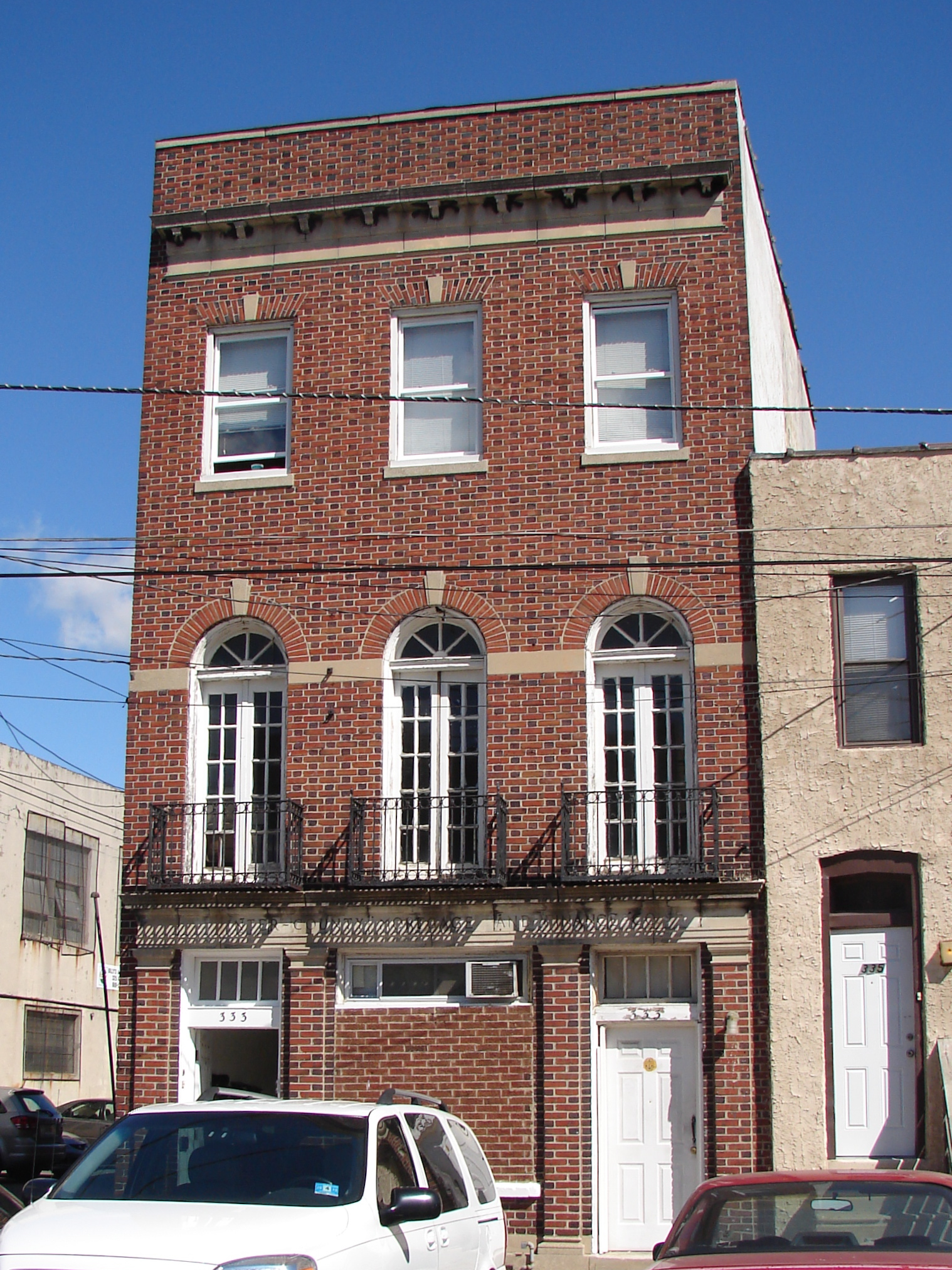

- Location within Camden County, New Jersey Location within New Jersey Location within the United States
- Location: 333 Arch Street, Camden, New Jersey
- Coordinates: 39°56′41″N 75°7′26″W
- Area: less than one acre
- Built: 1929
- Architect: Moffett, Herbert N.
- Architectural style: Regency Revival
- MPS: Banks, Insurance, and Legal Buildings in Camden, New Jersey, 1873-1938 MPS
- NRHP reference No.: 90001263
- NJRHP No.: 913

Significant dates
- Added to NRHP: August 22, 1990
- Designated NJRHP: January 11, 1990

Inter-County Mortgage and Finance Company is a historic building located in Camden, Camden County, New Jersey, United States. The building was finished in 1929 and was added to the National Register of Historic Places on August 22, 1990.

== See also ==
- National Register of Historic Places listings in Camden County, New Jersey
