= Edward Sharp House =

Historic house in New Jersey, United States

- U.S. National Register of Historic Places
- New Jersey Register of Historic Places
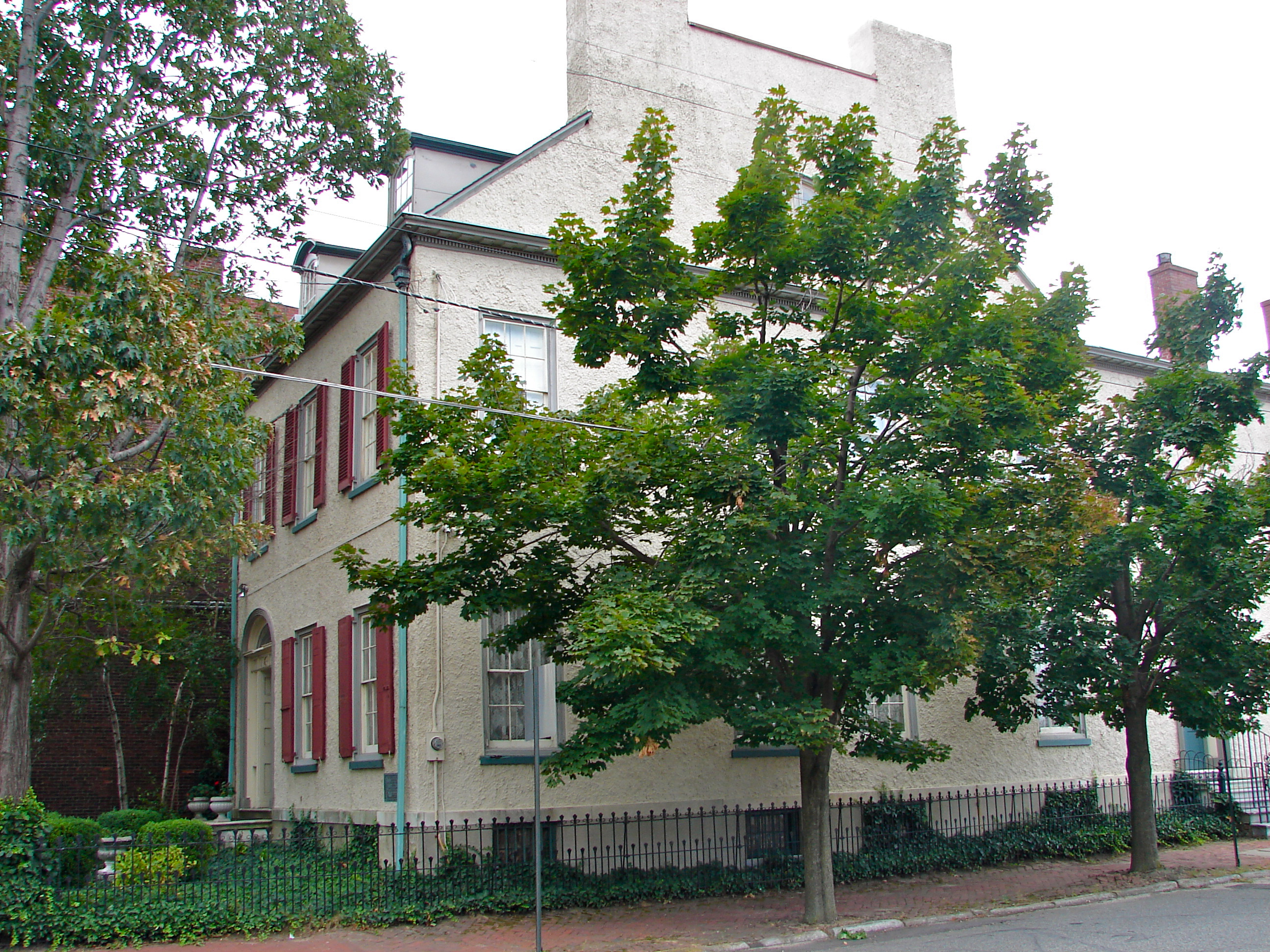

- Location within Camden County, New Jersey Location within New Jersey Location within the United States
- Location: 200 Cooper Street, Camden, New Jersey
- Coordinates: 39°56′50″N 75°7′30″W
- Area: less than one acre
- Built: 1810
- Architect: Gideon Vanwinkle Stivers
- Architectural style: Federal
- NRHP reference No.: 80002474
- NJRHP No.: 922

Significant dates
- Added to NRHP: February 29, 1980
- Designated NJRHP: October 26, 1979

Edward Sharp House is located in Camden, Camden County, New Jersey, United States. The house was built in 1810 and was added to the National Register of Historic Places on February 29, 1980.

== See also ==
- National Register of Historic Places listings in Camden County, New Jersey
