= Isaac Glover House =

Historic house in New Jersey, United States

Coordinates: 39.88018°N 75.08144°W

- U.S. National Register of Historic Places
- New Jersey Register of Historic Places
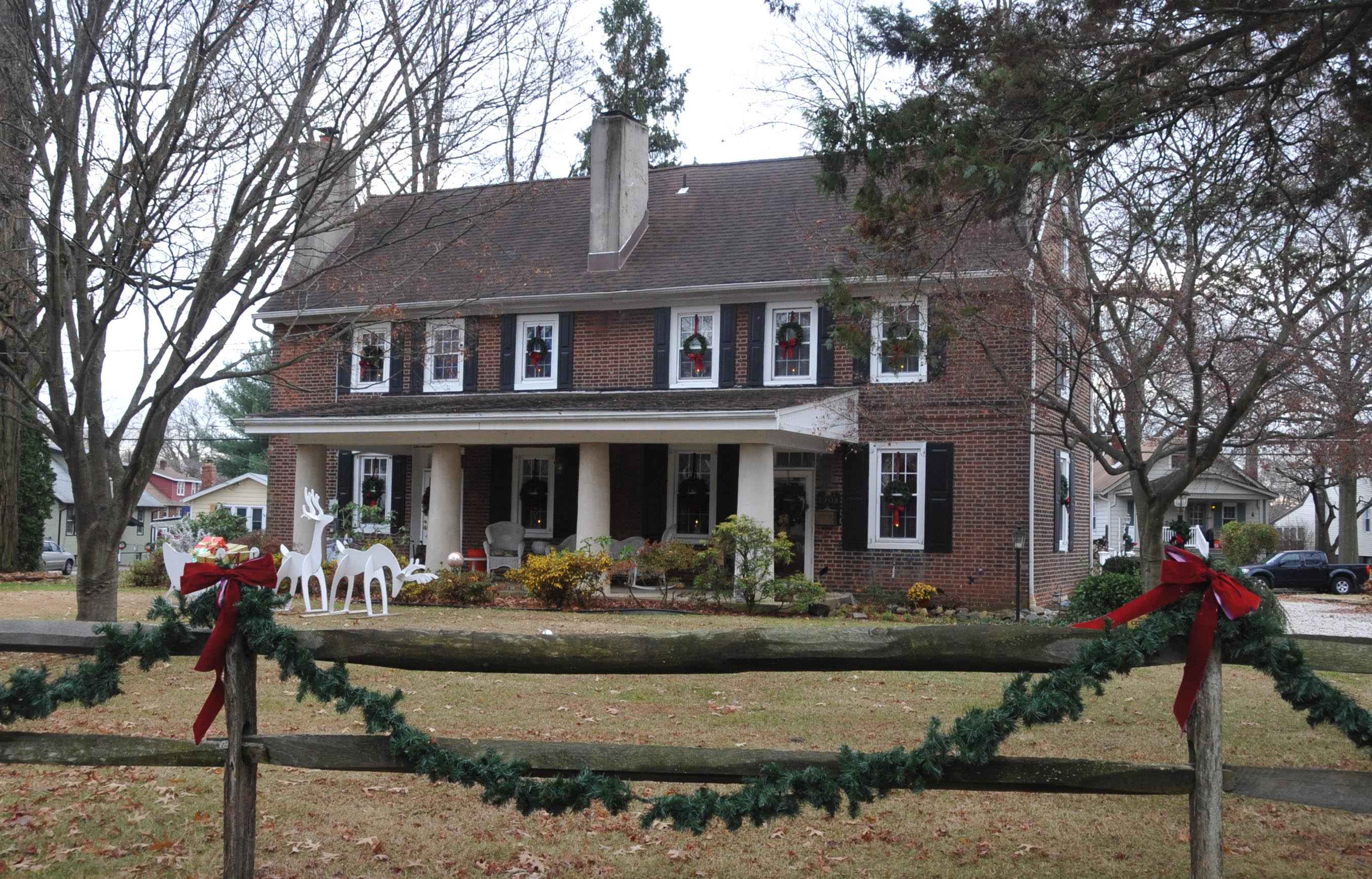

- Location within Camden County, New Jersey Location within New Jersey Location within the United States
- Location: 1908 New Jersey Avenue, Haddon Heights, New Jersey
- Built: c. 1750
- MPS: Haddon Heights Pre-Revolutionary Houses MPS
- NRHP reference No.: 94001117
- NJRHP No.: 963
- Designated NJRHP: September 23, 1994

The Isaac Glover House is located in Haddon Heights, Camden County, New Jersey, United States. The house was built c. 1750 and added to the National Register of Historic Places on September 23, 1994.

== See also ==
- National Register of Historic Places listings in Camden County, New Jersey
