= First Camden National Bank & Trust =

- U.S. National Register of Historic Places
- New Jersey Register of Historic Places
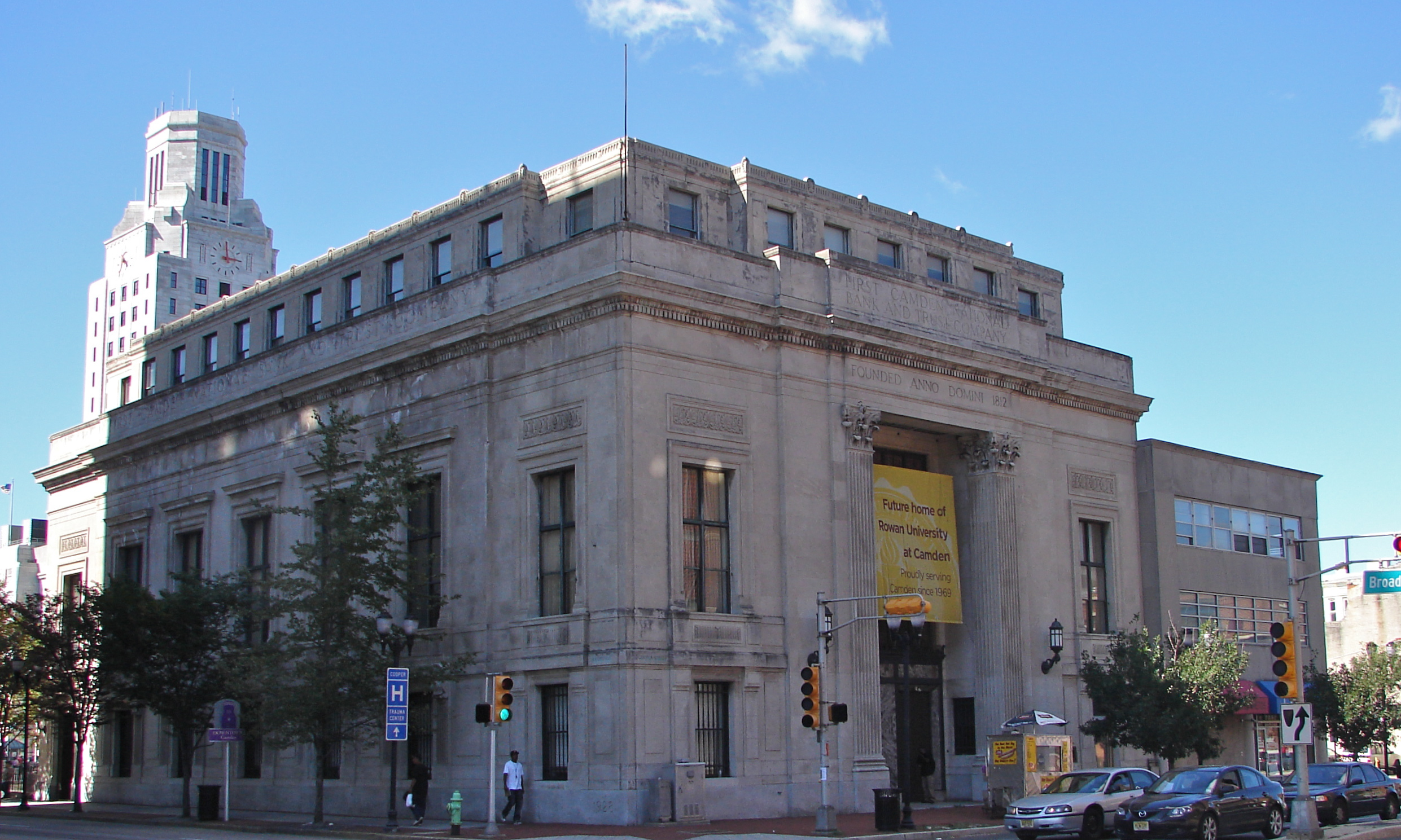

- Location within Camden County, New Jersey Location within New Jersey Location within the United States
- Location: Junction of Broadway and Cooper Street, Camden, New Jersey
- Coordinates: 39°56′42″N 75°7′10″W
- Built: 1928
- Built by: Irwin & Leighton
- Architect: Simon & Simon
- Architectural style: Classical Revival
- MPS: Banks, Insurance, and Legal Buildings in Camden, New Jersey, 1873-1938 MPS
- NRHP reference No.: 90001285
- NJRHP No.: 912

Significant dates
- Added to NRHP: August 24, 1990
- Designated NJRHP: January 11, 1990

First Camden National Bank & Trust, or the Camden Academic Building, is located at the junction of Broadway and Cooper Street in the city of Camden in Camden County, New Jersey, United States. The building was built in 1928 and was added to the National Register of Historic Places on August 24, 1990, for its significance in architecture and economics. The bank is part of the Banks, Insurance, and Legal Buildings in Camden, New Jersey, 1873–1938 Multiple Property Submission (MPS).

== History and description ==
Designed by the firm Simon & Simon, the building features Neoclassical Revival architecture. The bank that was headquartered here changed its name to "South Jersey National Bank" in the 1960s and to "Heritage Bank" in the 1970s. It later merged with Midlantic National Bank, which was ultimately acquired by PNC Bank.

In 2016, the building was renovated and became the Rowan University Camden Academic Building. The old vaults were converted to student lounges.

== See also ==
- National Register of Historic Places listings in Camden County, New Jersey
