= National Register of Historic Places listings in Camden County, New Jersey =

Location of Camden County in New Jersey

Contents: Counties and communities in New Jersey
Atlantic – Bergen (Closter, Franklin Lakes, Ridgewood, Saddle River, Wyckoff) – Burlington – Camden – Cape May – Cumberland – Essex – Gloucester – Hudson – Hunterdon – Mercer – Middlesex – Monmouth – Morris – Ocean – Passaic – Salem – Somerset – Sussex – Union – Warren

This is intended to be a complete list of properties and districts listed on the National Register of Historic Places in Camden County, New Jersey. Latitude and longitude coordinates of the sites listed on this page may be displayed in an online map.

This National Park Service list is complete through NPS recent listings posted April 24, 2026.

	Name on the Register	Image	Date listed	Location	City or town	Description
1	American National Bank	American National Bank	August 22, 1990 (#90001256)	1219 Broadway; 39°55′49″N 75°07′12″W	Camden	Demolished
2	Barclay Farm House	Barclay Farm House	January 26, 1978 (#78001753)	209 Barclay Lane; 39°54′19″N 74°59′54″W	Cherry Hill	
3	Barnegat	Barnegat	November 29, 1979 (#79002317)	North 7th Street; 39°57′21″N 75°06′46″W	Camden	Lightship (LV 79 / WAL 506); Was in Philadelphia
4	Volney G. Bennett Lumber Company	Volney G. Bennett Lumber Company	August 5, 1993 (#93000749)	138 Division St. and 845 S. 2nd St. 39°56′06″N 75°07′38″W	Camden	
5	Berlin Historic District	Berlin Historic District	April 14, 1995 (#95000408)	Along Washington, East Taunton, and Haines avenues and parts of South White Horse Pike, Jackson Road, and Jefferson Avenue; 39°47′34″N 74°55′43″W	Berlin	
6	Blackwood Historic District	Blackwood Historic District	July 27, 1989 (#89000996)	Roughly Church St. from E. Railroad Ave. to Indiana Ave., Blackhorse Pike, and Central Ave. 39°48′02″N 75°03′11″W	Blackwood	
7	Bonnie's Bridge	Bonnie's Bridge	September 13, 1984 (#84002604)	350 Wayland Rd. 39°54′39″N 75°00′18″W	Cherry Hill	
8	Broadway Trust Company	Broadway Trust Company	August 24, 1990 (#90001284)	938-944 Broadway; 39°56′02″N 75°07′09″W	Camden	part of the Banks, Insurance, and Legal Buildings in Camden MPS
9	Building 2, RCA Victor Complex	Building 2, RCA Victor Complex	February 4, 2019 (#100003402)	201 N. Front St. 39°56′53″N 75°07′34″W	Camden	
10	Building 17, RCA Victor Company, Camden Plant	Building 17, RCA Victor Company, Camden Plant	October 4, 2002 (#02001253)	1 Market St. 39°56′51″N 75°07′38″W	Camden	
11	Building at 525 Cooper Street	Building at 525 Cooper Street	August 24, 1990 (#90001286)	525 Cooper St. 39°56′48″N 75°07′14″W	Camden	Charles S. Boyer Building, part of the Banks, Insurance, and Legal Buildings in Camden MPS
12	Burrough–Dover House	Burrough–Dover House	October 25, 1973 (#73001089)	9201 Burrough-Dover Lane (off Haddonfield Road); 39°58′24″N 75°01′05″W	Pennsauken Township	
13	Camden Fire Insurance Association	Camden Fire Insurance Association	August 22, 1990 (#90001262)	428-432 Federal St. 39°56′38″N 75°07′20″W	Camden	Demolished.
14	Camden Free Public Library Main Building	Camden Free Public Library Main Building	October 15, 1992 (#92001385)	616 Broadway; 39°56′14″N 75°07′06″W	Camden	
15	Camden Safe Deposit & Trust Company	Camden Safe Deposit & Trust Company	August 22, 1990 (#90001258)	Market St. and Broadway; 39°56′43″N 75°07′09″W	Camden	part of the Banks, Insurance, and Legal Buildings in Camden MPS
16	Cattell Tract Historic District	Cattell Tract Historic District	September 8, 1994 (#94001103)	Roughly bounded by N. Chestnut Ave., Cove Rd., and Rogers and Leslie Aves. 39°57′16″N 75°02′57″W	Merchantville	
17	Centennial House	Centennial House	May 30, 1991 (#91000674)	17-19 E. Chestnut Ave. 39°57′10″N 75°02′56″W	Merchantville	
18	Central Trust Company	Central Trust Company	January 5, 2005 (#90001253)	401 Federal Street; 39°56′39″N 75°07′24″W	Camden	part of the Banks, Insurance, and Legal Buildings in Camden MPS
19	Chew–Powell House	Chew–Powell House	March 27, 1975 (#75001127)	500-502 Good Intent Road, Blenheim; 39°48′23″N 75°04′33″W	Gloucester Township	
20	Church of the Immaculate Conception	Church of the Immaculate Conception	December 10, 2003 (#03001277)	642 Market St. 39°56′41″N 75°07′08″W	Camden	
21	Cole Landing Tavern	Cole Landing Tavern	December 7, 2020 (#100005879)	500 Cole Landing Rd. 39°49′10″N 75°05′11″W	Gloucester Township	
22	Samuel Coles House	Samuel Coles House	June 18, 1973 (#73001087)	1743 Old Cuthbert Rd. 39°54′49″N 74°58′41″W	Cherry Hill	
23	Collings-Knight Homestead	Collings-Knight Homestead	September 10, 1987 (#87001518)	500 Collings Ave. 39°54′42″N 75°04′52″W	Collingswood	
24	Collingswood Commercial Historic District	Collingswood Commercial Historic District	September 13, 1990 (#90001439)	Roughly Haddon Ave. between Woodlawn and Fern, including adjacent areas on Collings Ave. 39°54′57″N 75°04′06″W	Collingswood	
25	Collingswood Residential Historic District	Collingswood Residential Historic District	September 13, 1990 (#90001436)	Roughly Knight Park and its bordering properties, including Park Ave. east to Dayton Ave. 39°54′46″N 75°04′40″W	Collingswood	
26	Collingswood Theatre	Collingswood Theatre	June 3, 1982 (#82003269)	843 Haddon Ave. 39°54′57″N 75°03′58″W	Collingswood	
27	Collins and Pancoast Hall	Collins and Pancoast Hall	February 16, 1984 (#84002608)	4-8 S. Centre St. 39°57′07″N 75°02′59″W	Merchantville	
28	Cooper Grant Historic District	Cooper Grant Historic District	January 30, 1989 (#87002229)	Point, N. Front, Linden, Penn, and N. 2nd Sts. Boundary increase: 300 N. Delaware Ave. 39°56′58″N 75°07′32″W	Camden	
29	Cooper Library in Johnson Park	Cooper Library in Johnson Park	March 11, 1980 (#80002473)	2nd and Cooper Sts. 39°56′53″N 75°07′31″W	Camden	
30	Cooper River Park Historic District	Cooper River Park Historic District	July 19, 2016 (#16000456)	Roughly bounded by Kaighn, Roberts, Glover & Narbeth Aves., N. Park, S. Edge Park & S. Park Drs., Kings Hwy. 39°55′33″N 75°05′02″W	Collingswood	
31	Cooper Street Historic District	Cooper Street Historic District	August 7, 1989 (#89001057)	Cooper St. from 2nd to 7th Sts. 39°56′49″N 75°07′17″W	Camden	
32	Joseph Cooper House	Joseph Cooper House	March 14, 1973 (#73001086)	Head of 7th St. in Pyne Point Park; 39°57′16″N 75°06′57″W	Camden	
33	Arthur Dorrance House	Arthur Dorrance House	May 13, 1994 (#94000391)	28 Franklin Ave. 39°57′05″N 75°02′49″W	Merchantville	
34	James M. Downey Building	James M. Downey Building	August 22, 1990 (#90001261)	521 Cooper St. 39°56′16″N 75°07′14″W	Camden	part of the Banks, Insurance, and Legal Buildings in Camden MPS
35	East End Trust Company	East End Trust Company	August 22, 1990 (#90001254)	2614-2616 Federal St. 39°56′46″N 75°05′19″W	Camden	part of the Banks, Insurance, and Legal Buildings in Camden MPS
36	Col. Joseph Ellis House	Col. Joseph Ellis House	September 23, 1994 (#94001110)	1009 Sycamore Street; 39°52′36″N 75°03′48″W	Haddon Heights	part of the Haddon Heights Pre-Revolutionary Houses MPS
37	Fairview District	Fairview District	November 19, 1974 (#74001157)	Roughly bounded by Newton Creek, Crescent Boulevard, Mt. Ephraim Ave., and Olympia and Hull Rds. 39°54′20″N 75°06′17″W	Camden	
38	Federal Building and Courthouse	Federal Building and Courthouse	January 4, 2012 (#11000992)	401 Market St. 39°56′46″N 75°07′19″W	Camden	
39	Finance Building	Finance Building	August 22, 1990 (#90001260)	549-559 Cooper St. 39°56′48″N 75°07′11″W	Camden	Demolished. Photo shows the replacement building.
40	First Camden National Bank & Trust	First Camden National Bank & Trust	August 24, 1990 (#90001285)	Junction of Broadway and Cooper St. 39°56′42″N 75°07′10″W	Camden	part of the Banks, Insurance, and Legal Buildings in Camden MPS
41	Four Echelon Plaza	Four Echelon Plaza	February 27, 2026 (#100012755)	201 Laurel Road; 39°50′52″N 75°00′07″W	Voorhees Township	
42	Gatehouse at Colestown Cemetery	Gatehouse at Colestown Cemetery	May 21, 1975 (#75001128)	Kings Highway and Church Road; 39°56′00″N 74°59′24″W	Cherry Hill	Gatehouse to the Colestown Cemetery
43	Glendale Methodist Episcopal Church	Glendale Methodist Episcopal Church	August 4, 1995 (#95001000)	615 Haddonfield-Berlin Rd. (Route 561) at its junction with White Horse Rd. 39°51′14″N 74°58′58″W	Voorhees Township	
44	Gloucester City Water Works Engine House	Gloucester City Water Works Engine House	March 30, 1998 (#98000235)	Junction of Johnson Boulevard and Gaunt St. 39°53′47″N 75°06′53″W	Gloucester City	
45	Glover Fulling Mill Site	Glover Fulling Mill Site	September 28, 1990 (#90001452)	Address Restricted	Haddon Heights	
46	Isaac Glover House	Isaac Glover House	September 23, 1994 (#94001117)	1908 New Jersey Avenue; 39°52′49″N 75°04′53″W	Haddon Heights	part of the Haddon Heights Pre-Revolutionary Houses MPS
47	Grant A.M.E. Church	Grant A.M.E. Church	October 5, 1977 (#77000857)	4th and Washington Sts. 39°44′06″N 74°52′46″W	Chesilhurst	Church built in 1896 and destroyed sometime after 1977. The photo shows its replacement.
48	Greenfield Hall	Greenfield Hall	June 5, 1974 (#74001158)	343 Kings Highway, E. 39°54′01″N 75°05′11″W	Haddonfield	
49	Haddon Fortnightly Club House	Haddon Fortnightly Club House	October 26, 1972 (#72000771)	301 Kings Highway; 39°53′59″N 75°01′45″W	Haddonfield	
50	Haddonfield Historic District	Haddonfield Historic District	July 21, 1982 (#82003270)	Roughly bounded by Washington, Hopkins, Summit, and E. Park Aves., and the Kings Highway; 39°53′49″N 75°02′00″W	Haddonfield	
51	Hadrosaurus foulkii Leidy Site	Hadrosaurus foulkii Leidy Site	October 12, 1994 (#94001648)	End of Maple Avenue near the Cooper River; 39°54′34″N 75°01′40″W	Haddonfield	
52	Hillman Hospital House	Hillman Hospital House	July 14, 1977 (#77000858)	500 3rd Ave. 39°50′15″N 75°03′40″W	Glendora	
53	Hinchman-Lippincott House	Hinchman-Lippincott House	February 17, 1995 (#94001121)	1089 N. Park Avenue; 39°52′48″N 75°04′01″W	Haddon Heights	part of the Haddon Heights Pre-Revolutionary Houses MPS
54	Indian King Tavern	Indian King Tavern	December 18, 1970 (#70000382)	233 Kings Highway, E. 39°53′56″N 75°01′52″W	Haddonfield	
55	Inter-County Mortgage and Finance Company	Inter-County Mortgage and Finance Company	August 22, 1990 (#90001263)	333 Arch St. 39°56′41″N 75°07′26″W	Camden	part of the Banks, Insurance, and Legal Buildings in Camden MPS
56	Kay-Evans Farm	Kay-Evans Farm	June 28, 2000 (#00000693)	100 Borton Mill Rd. 39°53′54″N 75°01′13″W	Cherry Hill	better known as the Croft Farm
57	Lawnside School	Lawnside School	March 17, 2015 (#15000092)	23 N. Warwick Rd. 39°52′06″N 75°02′04″W	Lawnside Borough	
58	Long-a-Coming Depot	Long-a-Coming Depot	February 14, 1997 (#97000063)	Between Washington and E. Taunton Aves., southeast of the junction of Route 73 and E. Taunton Ave. 39°47′38″N 74°55′34″W	Berlin	
59	John Lucas House	John Lucas House	March 29, 2019 (#100003591)	10 Clemonton Rd. E. 39°50′20″N 74°57′51″W	Gibbsboro	
60	Macedonia African Methodist Episcopal Church	Macedonia African Methodist Episcopal Church	March 12, 2012 (#12000108)	261-265 Spruce St. 39°56′06″N 75°07′29″W	Camden	
61	Marcouse Building	Marcouse Building	August 24, 1990 (#90001266)	231 Market St. 39°56′47″N 75°07′28″W	Camden	part of the Banks, Insurance, and Legal Buildings in Camden MPS
62	Robert Marshall House	Robert Marshall House	January 16, 2008 (#07001402)	510 Almonesson Rd. 39°48′44″N 75°04′50″W	Gloucester Township	
63	Peter J. McGuire Memorial and Gravesite	Peter J. McGuire Memorial and Gravesite	January 17, 2019 (#100003321)	Arlington Cemetery, 1620 Cove Rd. 39°58′06″N 75°03′29″W	Pennsauken Township	
64	Samuel Mickle House	Samuel Mickle House	May 21, 1975 (#75001129)	345 Kings Highway, East; 39°54′03″N 75°01′38″W	Haddonfield	Also known as the Hip Roof House
65	Griffith Morgan House	Griffith Morgan House	January 25, 1973 (#73001088)	234 Griffith Morgan Lane (off River Road); 39°59′24″N 75°02′55″W	Pennsauken Township	
66	Peter Mott House	Peter Mott House	September 8, 1994 (#94001101)	Junction of Moore and Gloucester Aves. 39°52′02″N 75°02′10″W	Lawnside	
67	Mount Peace Cemetery and Funeral Directing Company Cemetery	Mount Peace Cemetery and Funeral Directing Company Cemetery	July 29, 2009 (#08000971)	329 U.S. Route 30; 39°52′13″N 75°02′35″W	Lawnside	
68	National State Bank	National State Bank	August 24, 1990 (#90001267)	123 Market St. 39°56′47″N 75°07′34″W	Camden	part of the Banks, Insurance, and Legal Buildings in Camden MPS
69	New Jersey Safe Deposit and Trust Company	New Jersey Safe Deposit and Trust Company	August 24, 1990 (#90001265)	Market and 3rd Sts. 39°56′47″N 75°07′40″W	Camden	part of the Banks, Insurance, and Legal Buildings in Camden MPS
70	Newton Friends' Meetinghouse	Newton Friends' Meetinghouse	August 12, 1971 (#71000498)	722 Cooper St. 39°56′45″N 75°07′01″W	Camden	
71	Newton Union Schoolhouse	Newton Union Schoolhouse	October 27, 1988 (#88002122)	Collings and Lynne Aves. 39°54′31″N 75°05′30″W	Haddon Township	
72	The Oaks Historic District	The Oaks Historic District	July 9, 1997 (#97000772)	Roughly bounded by W. Maple Ave., Browning Rd., Volan St., and Oak Terrace; 39°56′55″N 75°03′32″W	Merchantville	
73	Pomona Hall	Pomona Hall	August 12, 1971 (#71000499)	Park Boulevard and Euclid Ave. 39°55′51″N 75°05′40″W	Camden	
74	Ritz Theatre	Ritz Theatre	December 26, 2002 (#02001625)	915 White Horse Pike; 39°54′01″N 75°04′33″W	Haddon Township	
75	St. Bartholomew Roman Catholic Church	St. Bartholomew Roman Catholic Church	December 3, 2018 (#100003202)	751 Kaighn Ave. 39°55′53″N 75°06′50″W	Camden	
76	Sears, Roebuck and Company Retail Department Store-Camden	Sears, Roebuck and Company Retail Department Store-Camden	July 27, 2000 (#00000795)	1300 Admiral Wilson Boulevard; 39°56′37″N 75°06′37″W	Camden	Demolished in 2013.
77	Edward Sharp House	Edward Sharp House	February 29, 1980 (#80002474)	200 Cooper St. 39°56′50″N 75°07′30″W	Camden	
78	Smith-Austermuhl Insurance Company	Smith-Austermuhl Insurance Company	August 24, 1990 (#90001301)	Northwestern corner of the junction of 5th and Market Sts. 39°56′49″N 75°07′17″W	Camden	part of the Banks, Insurance, and Legal Buildings in Camden MPS
79	Solomon Wesley United Methodist Church	Solomon Wesley United Methodist Church	April 10, 1989 (#89000241)	291-B Davistown Rd./Asyla Rd. 39°47′35″N 75°02′46″W	Blackwood	
80	South Camden Historic District	South Camden Historic District	September 28, 1990 (#90001453)	Roughly bounded by Jackson St., S. 4th St., Chelton Ave., and Railroad Ave. 39°55′18″N 75°07′13″W	Camden	
81	South Camden Trust Company	South Camden Trust Company	August 24, 1990 (#90001255)	Broadway at Ferry St. 39°55′19″N 75°07′12″W	Camden	part of the Banks, Insurance, and Legal Buildings in Camden MPS
82	South Jersey Gas, Electric and Traction Company Office Building	South Jersey Gas, Electric and Traction Company Office Building	January 5, 2005 (#04001436)	418 Federal St. 39°56′51″N 75°07′16″W	Camden	
83	St. John's Episcopal Church and Burying Ground	St. John's Episcopal Church and Burying Ground	November 22, 1980 (#80002475)	Chews Landing Rd. and Old Black Horse Pike; 39°49′56″N 75°03′48″W	Runnemede	
84	St. Joseph Polish Catholic Church	St. Joseph Polish Catholic Church	December 18, 2003 (#03001307)	1010 Liberty St. 39°55′49″N 75°06′36″W	Camden	
85	Station Avenue Business District	Station Avenue Business District	November 13, 1989 (#89001945)	Station Ave. from 7th Ave. to White Horse Pike; 39°52′56″N 75°03′32″W	Haddon Heights	
86	Stokes–Lee House	Stokes–Lee House	September 10, 1987 (#87001519)	615–617 Lee's Avenue; 39°54′31″N 75°04′12″W	Collingswood	
87	Dr. Henry Genet Taylor House and Office	Dr. Henry Genet Taylor House and Office	August 12, 1971 (#71000500)	305 Cooper St. 39°56′51″N 75°07′23″W	Camden	
88	Thackara House	Thackara House	September 10, 1987 (#87001520)	912 Eldridge Ave. 39°54′29″N 75°05′17″W	Collingswood	
89	Ephraim and Sarah Tomlinson House	Ephraim and Sarah Tomlinson House	April 8, 2019 (#100003592)	710 West Laurel Road; 39°49′07″N 75°00′55″W	Stratford	Demolished in 2022
90	Isaac Tomlinson House	Isaac Tomlinson House	March 9, 2005 (#05000123)	834 Blackwood-Clementon Rd. 39°48′16″N 75°00′42″W	Pine Hill	
91	USS New Jersey (BB-62)	USS New Jersey (BB-62)	September 17, 2004 (#04000980)	62 Battleship Place; 39°56′31″N 75°07′57″W	Camden	
92	Victory Trust Company	Victory Trust Company	August 24, 1990 (#90001257)	Broadway and Spruce St. 39°56′06″N 75°07′11″W	Camden	Demolished. Photo shows the replacement building.
93	Westmont Theatre	Westmont Theatre	October 14, 2010 (#10000834)	49 Haddon Ave. 39°54′46″N 75°03′14″W	Haddon Township	
94	White Horse Pike Historic District	White Horse Pike Historic District	October 27, 1988 (#88002104)	Roughly bounded by 4th Ave., High and Haddon Sts., E. Atlantic St., the Kings Highway, and Green St. 39°52′58″N 75°03′24″W	Haddon Heights	
95	George Whitman House	George Whitman House	October 11, 1990 (#90001482)	431 Stevens St. 39°56′31″N 75°07′24″W	Camden	Demolished. Photo shows the neighboring building and the empty lot.
96	Walt Whitman House	Walt Whitman House	October 15, 1966 (#66000461)	330 Mickle Street; 39°56′33″N 75°07′26″W	Camden	
97	Walt Whitman Neighborhood	Walt Whitman Neighborhood	January 20, 1978 (#78001752)	326–332 Mickle Street; 39°56′32″N 75°07′26″W	Camden	
98	Wilson Building	Wilson Building	August 24, 1990 (#90001259)	Cooper St. and Broadway; 39°56′46″N 75°07′08″W	Camden	part of the Banks, Insurance, and Legal Buildings in Camden MPS
99	Woodlynne Log Cabin	Woodlynne Log Cabin	August 21, 1997 (#97000933)	200 block of Cooper Ave. 39°54′58″N 75°05′45″W	Woodlynne	
100	A.S. Woodruff and Law Buildings	A.S. Woodruff and Law Buildings	August 24, 1990 (#90001264)	328-330 Market St. 39°56′45″N 75°07′23″W	Camden	part of the Banks, Insurance, and Legal Buildings in Camden MPS
