= Sears, Roebuck and Company Retail Department Store-Camden =

- U.S. National Register of Historic Places
- New Jersey Register of Historic Places
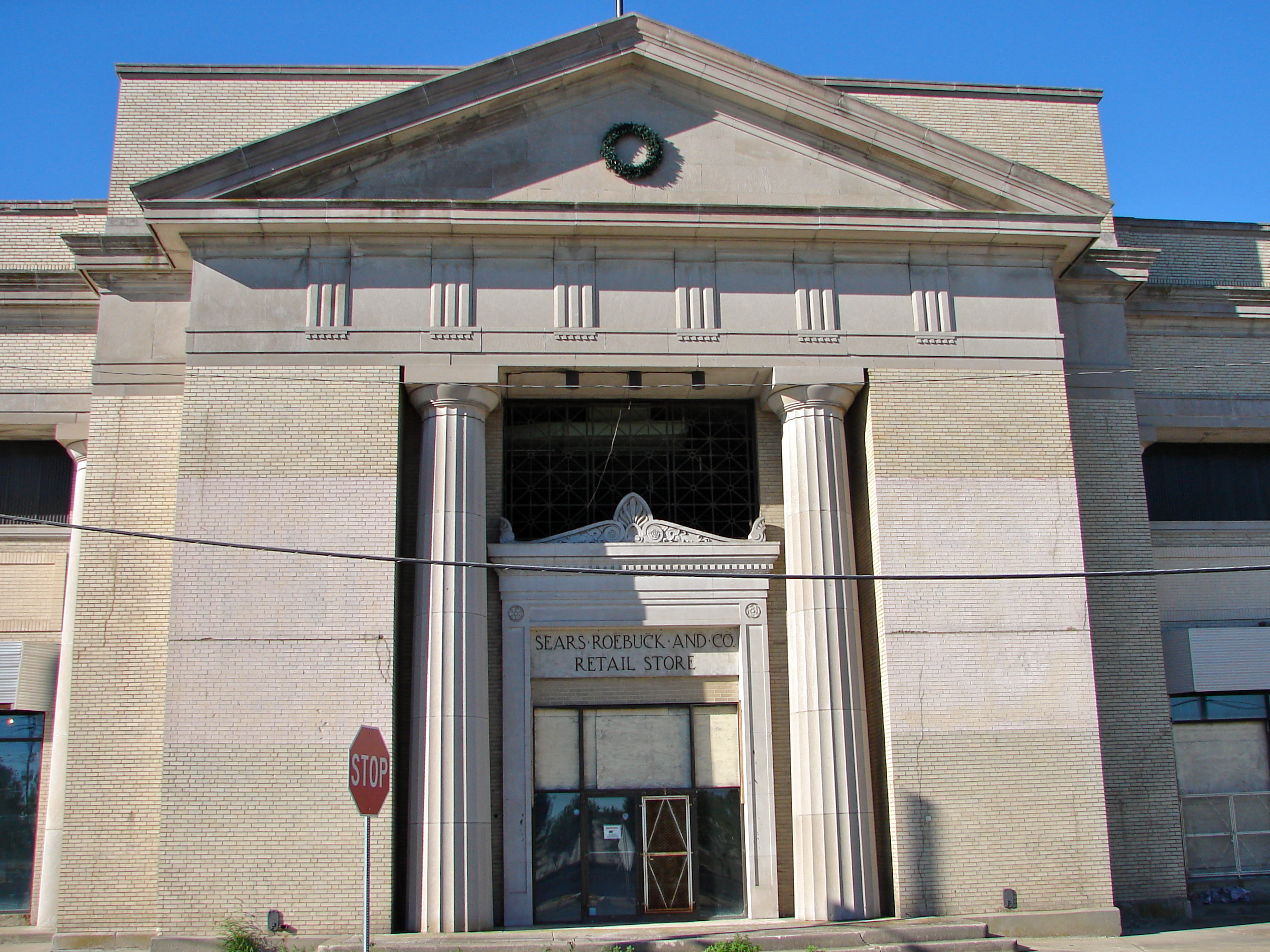

- Location within Camden County, New Jersey Location within New Jersey Location within the United States
- Location: 1300 Admiral Wilson Boulevard, Camden, New Jersey
- Coordinates: 39°56′37″N 75°6′37″W
- Area: 3.5 acres (1.4 ha)
- Built: 1927
- Architect: Carr, George Wallace; Nimmons, George C.
- Architectural style: Classical Revival
- Demolished: June 5, 2013 – August 23, 2013
- NRHP reference No.: 00000795
- NJRHP No.: 8

Significant dates
- Added to NRHP: July 27, 2000
- Designated NJRHP: May 22, 2000

The Sears, Roebuck and Company Retail Department Store Building in Camden, Camden County, New Jersey, United States, was built in 1927 and housed a Sears department store until 1971, when the store relocated to Moorestown Mall. It was South Jersey's first free-standing department store. It was also among the first department stores to be built with its own parking lot, a precursor to the modern shopping mall. It was added to the National Register of Historic Places on July 27, 2000.

After Sears relocated, the building was home at different times to a nightclub, a car dealership, a day care center, and a housing authority office, before becoming vacant for several years. In 2007, it was purchased by Ilan Zaken, owner of the hip-hop clothing company Miskeen Originals, for $2.7 million (~$3.92 million in 2024). Zaken spent more than $1 million on a plan to transform it into his company's headquarters as well as a culinary school and restaurant supply mall, but the project was not completed.

In February 2011, a New Jersey Superior Court judge ruled that the city could acquire the building through eminent domain.

On June 11, 2012, Campbell Soup Company, whose corporate headquarters is nearby, purchased the building for about $3.5 million, with plans to demolish it. Campbell contended that uncertainty surrounding the building impeded its development of an adjacent office park. The purchase effectively ended the ongoing legal battle to preserve the building.

Demolition of the building began on June 5, 2013. It was completed on August 23, 2013.

== See also ==
- National Register of Historic Places listings in Camden County, New Jersey
