= Quincy (band) =

- Origin: New Jersey, United States
- Genres: New wave, power pop, punk rock
- Years active: 1976–1983
- Label: Columbia
- Past members: Stephen Butler; Brian Butler; Gerald Takach; Alex Takach; Bob Holden; Wally Smith

Quincy was a new wave/power pop band from New Jersey. They released their first album on Columbia Records in 1980 self-titled Quincy, and an EP in 1983 entitled Don't Say No, using the band name Lulu Temple.

== Formation ==
The band was formed by two sets of brothers, Stephen and Brian Butler, and Gerald and Alex Takach. The brothers had met while going to Haddon Heights High School in New Jersey during the 1970s and eventually forming Quincy, where they started off with an acoustic/electric soft rock sound with 4 part vocal harmonies. In 1976, Quincy did a month-long tour of the midwest with Bob Holden on drums. A few months later on Friday August 13, 1976, while playing at JC Dobbs club on South Street in Philadelphia, Alex Takach was mysteriously murdered.

After a short period of inactivity, the band re-emerged embracing the punk/new wave movement. Gerald Takach took the stage name Gerald Emerick and the band added Wally Smith (a.k.a. Metro) on keyboards. They found their way to CBGB in New York and became a regular fixture in the late 1970s. They were managed by the owner of CBGB, Hilly Kristal. Quincy released a single on CBGB Records titled "Can't Live In A Dream"/"Salvation Fantasy". The band eventually signed with Columbia/CBS Records. The debut album was released to favorable reviews and enthusiasm at radio stations.

== Name change ==
Shortly after the first album came out, Quincy Jones sued them for using his name. CBS Records did not help the band with the lawsuit. (Both the band and Jones recorded for CBS, and Jones was vastly more powerful than the band.) The band Quincy and Quincy Jones eventually settled out of court. The band then changed its name to Lulu Temple. The settlement stipulated that no mention could be made of the lawsuit in public.

After a long battle to release a second record, the album Don't Say No was released under the new name Lulu Temple. In addition to the new name, the band took on a new musical direction adding horns and percussion and a more layered approach. Without the support of the label and the lack of press, even the band's fan base didn't know of their new record.

== Disbandment ==
The band soon split up and went their separate ways in various musical and theatrical endeavors. The Butler brothers eventually founded the band Smash Palace.
