= Hinchman-Lippincott House =

Historic house in New Jersey, United States

- U.S. National Register of Historic Places
- New Jersey Register of Historic Places
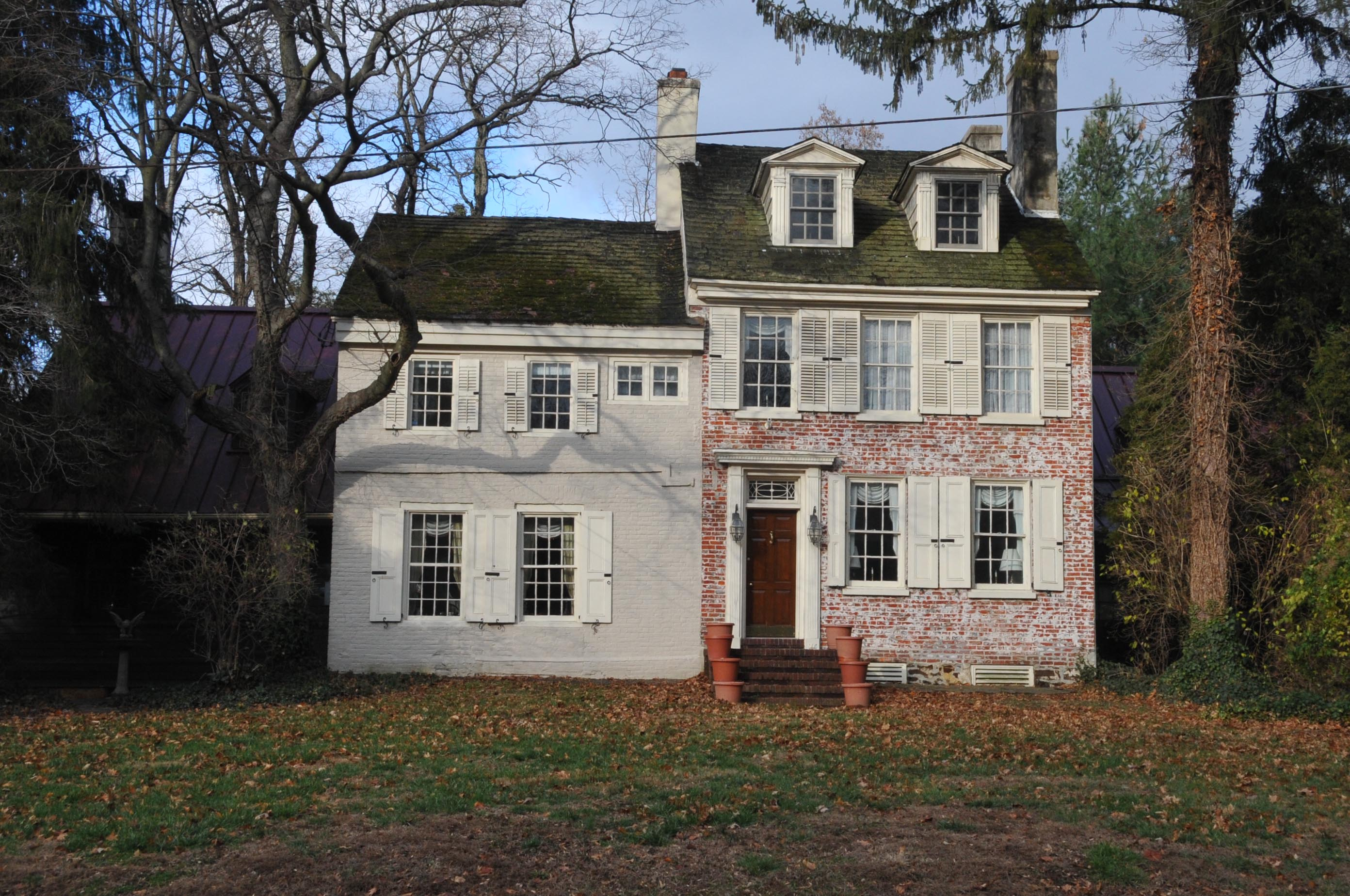

- Location within Camden County, New Jersey Location within New Jersey Location within the United States
- Location: 1089 North Park Avenue, Haddon Heights, New Jersey
- Coordinates: 39°52′48″N 75°03′59″W
- Built: c. 1699
- Architect: Francis Collins
- Architectural style: Greek Revival, Georgian
- MPS: Haddon Heights Pre-Revolutionary Houses MPS
- NRHP reference No.: 94001121
- NJRHP No.: 965

Significant dates
- Added to NRHP: February 17, 1995
- Designated NJRHP: February 28, 1990

The Hinchman-Lippincott House is located at 1089 North Park Avenue in Haddon Heights of Camden County, New Jersey, United States. The house was built c. 1699 and added to the National Register of Historic Places on February 17, 1995, for its significance in architecture and exploration/settlement. It is part of the Haddon Heights Pre-Revolutionary Houses Multiple Property Submission (MPS).

== History ==
The Hinchmann-Lippincott house is associated with the earliest founders of Haddon Heights, New Jersey. The first permanent settlement in the Haddon Heights area was established by various families from Flushing, New York. John Hinchmann purchased a 1000-acre plot from John Hugg in 1699.

In the early 1700s John Hinchmann built two farmhouses on the property: the Hinchmann-Lippincott House and the Col. Joseph Ellis House.

The Hinchmann family owned the property until it was divided and sold by Isaac Hinchmann in 1762. The Hinchmann-Lippincott House and 100 acres was bought by David Hurley. In 1807, James Hurley sold the property, including the house, to Nathaniel Lippincott. Benjamin Lippincott, who built the first railroad station in Haddon Heights, was also the last Lippincott to live in the house. In the early twentieth century, he subdivided the land for housing.

== See also ==
- National Register of Historic Places listings in Camden County, New Jersey
- Col. Joseph Ellis House
