= Pippa Mouse =

Children's book series by Betty Boegehold

- Pippa Mouse; Here's Pippa Again!; Pippa Pops Out!; Hurray for Pippa!
- Author: Betty Boegehold
- Illustrator: Cyndy Szekeres
- Country: United States
- Language: English
- Genre: Children's fiction
- Publisher: Alfred A. Knopf
- Published: 1973–1980

Pippa Mouse is a series of children's books by American author Betty Boegehold, with illustrations by Cyndy Szekeres. Each book features four or six short adventures about the titular character, an independent female mouseling living in the woods. Boegehold originally conceived the character as a boy named Pippen, but changed the name and gender under persuasion from a lecture on literary sexism.

The four original Pippa titles were published by Alfred A. Knopf between 1973 and 1980. A compilation of the first two followed posthumously in 1989, with re-illustrated installments from Random House following a decade later. The series earned mixed to positive reception throughout its run.

== Overview ==
Pippa, the titular character of the series, is a brown-eyed woodland mouse dressed in a pinafore. With her friends—a squirrel, duck, bird, and cricket—she engages in "playful adventures". As early as the first installment, she "is allowed by her wise parents to test out her own abilities."

Pippa was originally a boy mouse named Pippen in Betty Boegehold's original manuscript; a Princeton, New Jersey lecture on literary sexism convinced her to change the character's name and gender. In a 1973 Mount Vernon Argus story, she stated her intent for the first book: "[I planned] to show a sturdy [independent] activist, but my main point was to show that everything you do doesn't necessarily work." By the start of the 1980s, Pippa was promoted as a non-sexist series for young readers.

=== Original books ===
The original Pippa Mouse series consists of four books published by Knopf. Each story by Boegehold is only several lines in length, and is accompanied by black-and-white illustrations from Cyndy Szekeres. (Note: Attributed to multiple sources: Christian 1973, Claiborne 1973, Ehlert & Gerhardt 1975, Coffey 1979, Coffey 1980, and Spencer 1980.)

| # | Title | Date | Stories | Ref. | ISBN |
|---|---|---|---|---|---|
| 1 | Pippa Mouse | September 1973 | 6 | | 0-394-82671-X |
| 2 | Here's Pippa Again! | April 1975 | 6 | | 0-394-83090-3 |
| 3 | Pippa Pops Out! | March 1979 | 4 | | 0-394-84057-7 |
| 4 | Hurray for Pippa! | March 1980 | 4 | | 0-394-84067-4 |

=== Posthumous books ===
At the end of the 1990s, Random House's Jellybean Books imprint posthumously re-released two Pippa stories, with Julie Durrell as their new illustrator. A third one, A Pet for Pippa Mouse (ISBN 0-679-99340-1), was announced on the back cover of a Sesame Street Jellybean title, and listed in the 2002 edition of R.R. Bowker's Children's Books in Print. A 1989 compilation of the first two books, Here's Pippa!, was in print as late as 2003.

| Title | Date | Ref. | ISBN |
|---|---|---|---|
| Here's Pippa! | 1989 | | 0-394-82702-3 |
Collects the stories of the first two installments.
| Pippa Mouse's House | Fall 1998 | | 0-679-99191-3 |
A reprint of "Her Mouse House" from the 1973 original.
| Hurray for Christmas! | 1999 | | 0-375-80148-0 |
A reprint of the Christmas story from the 1973 original. (Note: Connor 1999: "Pippa is tucked into bed with the story of 'Not-Even.' ('Not a creature was stirring,/Not-Even, a mouse...!')")

== Reception ==
"A perfect book for the quiet, gentle child. Especially a gentle mouse-loving child."

— Jane Yolen, Daily Hampshire Gazette

"A list of the world's most adorable, furry creatures would have to include Pippa, along with baby chickens and kittens."

— Raymond Teague, The Mini Page

Both Pippa Mouse and Here's Pippa Again! were selections of the Junior Literary Guild. The inaugural installment was also a bestseller during its original publication, and was recommended by Gene Shalit of The Today Show. The series remained popular into the mid-1980s; sales of the posthumous title, Pippa Mouse's House, reached more than 117,000 in early 1999.

Throughout its publication, the series received mixed to positive reviews. Writing for the Modern Language Association journal Chilldren's Literature, Sandra Fenichel Asher had mixed feelings on the first book. Despite the warmth of Boegehold and Szekeres' work, she said it "would do better as read-to-me for the preschool set. I fear the modern first grader is too sophisticated for such cuteness". Jane Yolen of Massachusetts' Daily Hampshire Gazette positively reviewed the first and fourth titles; she wrote that Pippa's charm overcame the sentimentality of Szekeres' illustrations, and declared Hurray "as true to the heart and the funnybone as the others."

Reviewers of the other three original installments found Szekeres' artwork of the titular character fitting for Boegehold's text, and vice versa. However, a local Kentucky librarian critiqued the text of Again! in the Lexington Herald-Leader: "Why [the author] decided to write in the present tense is a puzzle. It casts an awkward gait on the free spirited prose." The School Library Journal gave the 1973 debut a starred review, but was more critical of later books. They wrote that Pops Out! "dawdles" with a clichéd "new-baby-brother" ending; Hurray's story was "as cluttered as [the mouseling's] pack-rat nest"; and Christmas! had an "overly sweet story [line] and too-cute illustrations." In a retrospective capsule review, Masha Rudman stated that the series "delights young children at the same time that it offers them a lively, bright model for their consideration."
