= Smash Palace (rock band) =

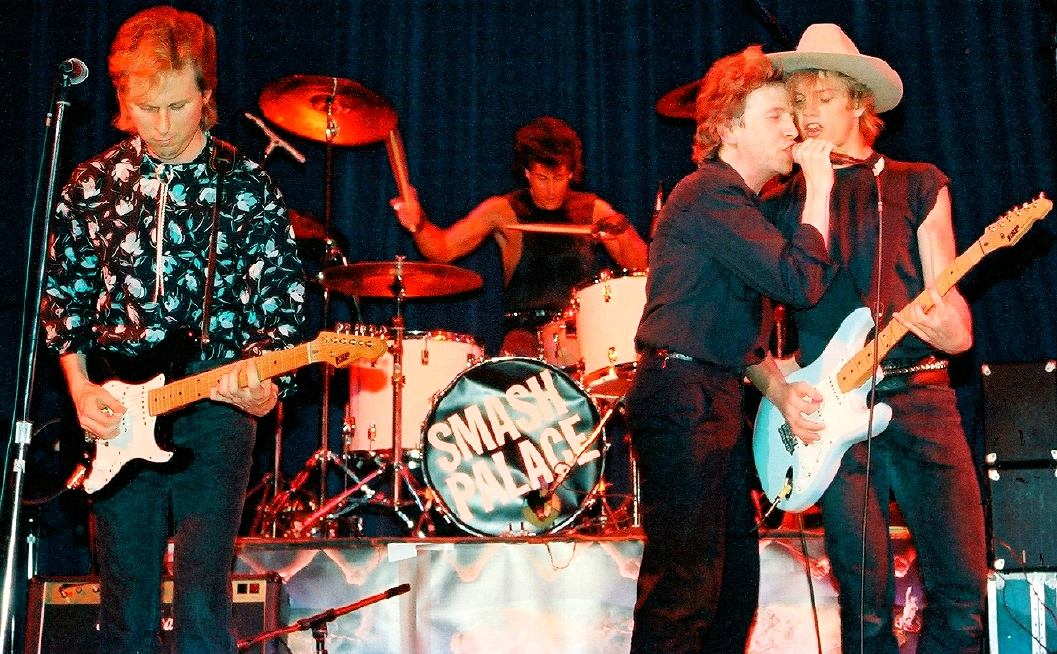
- Smash Palace at the Tower Theater in Upper Darby in 1986

Background information
- Origin: Haddon Heights, New Jersey, U.S.
- Genres: New wave, pop rock, power pop
- Years active: 1983–present
- Labels: Epic, Imagine Records, Back Porch Music

Smash Palace are an American power pop rock band currently based out of Southern New Jersey.

== Pre-Smash Palace ==
Brothers Stephen and Brian Butler originally led a new wave-power pop band called Quincy. The band recorded an LP for Columbia Records in 1980 and began to tour, but their momentum was curtailed when producer/performer Quincy Jones saw the name "Quincy" on the marquee at the Whisky a Go Go in Los Angeles, CA. He sent the band a trademark infringement cease-and-desist order and Quincy were no longer allowed to use the name and broke up soon afterward. Quincy did record one more EP for Columbia records but under the new name Lulu Temple. Stephen and Brian became unhappy with the direction that the band was taking and quit while the record was being recorded. The Lulu Temple EP was released in 1983.

== Smash Palace ==
The Butler brothers quickly formed a new band, Smash Palace, and signed with Epic Records in 1985. The new line-up included Brian Butler (lead vocals), Stephen Butler (lead guitar and vocals), Phil Rizzo (bass guitar), Harry Lewis (drums) and Greg Persun (rhythm guitar).

The band's first self-titled LP was released in the fall of 1985 along with an MTV video of the first single, "Living on the Borderline" (directed by Nigel Dick).

Smash Palace then toured extensively throughout the United States and Canada with Mr. Mister and the Cruzados. Greg DiDonato (keyboards) joined the lineup for the tour. When Smash Palace's A&R man, Dick Wingate, left Epic Records in 1985, he asked the band to come on over to his new label, Polygram Records. Unfortunately, once the band left Epic, the offer from Polygram melted away.

The band recorded demos for tracks that were intended for their second album, including "Cold Wind", "Girl with the Stars in Her Eyes", "Stranger Than Strange" and "I'll Be There" (which was later reworked and recorded on the band's Over the Top CD release in 2004) and these tracks were played on Philadelphia radio station WMMR-FM's local music program Street Beat, but never officially released.

== Inactive years ==
Disillusioned and broke, Stephen and Brian took staff songwriter jobs at CBS Songs, EMI, and then with BMG. DiDonato remained active with Brian and Steve in the studio providing keys, drums, and later, engineering services. Not finding much happiness or success in the hit song writing business, the brothers left the music business altogether for a while. Stephen was the first to return in 1997, working as a co-writer and guitarist with the band Mary Lee's Corvette. This has been a lasting relationship that Stephen has maintained for the past 10 years and he has produced the most recent Mary Lee's Corvette album Love, Loss and Lunacy which was released in 2006.

== Fast, Long, Loud ==
In 1999, the Butler brothers reunited to record a new Smash Palace CD, Fast, Long, Loud, the follow-up recording to their 1985 LP with a 14-year gap in between. The new album was recorded by just the brothers themselves at Stephen's house using recording equipment he had just recently purchased. Once the tracks were completed, Smash Palace signed with the indie label Imagine Records.

The first single "Another Man" was a top 100 rock radio track for the summer of 1999. Smash Palace then re-formed to play out live with a new line-up which included Stephen Butler (lead vocals and lead guitar), Brian Butler (drums and vocals), DyAnne DiSalvo (rhythm guitar and vocals), Phil Rizzo (bass guitar) and Greg DiDonato (keyboards).

== Unlocked, Over the Top, and more ==
In 2001 the next Smash Palace album released was titled Unlocked, followed by 2004's Over the Top. The Best Of '99-06 came out in 2006 on Zip Records.

Anthony Bezich took over drumming for the band in 2004 with the retirement from live performing by Brian Butler. Brian is still active in writing and recording aspects but spends his time these days pursuing other passions such as art and photography.

Smash Palace have currently been touring the east coast of the United States and also the United Kingdom. Their album Everybody Comes and Goes was released in January 2008.

Since 2012, Smash Palace has a new line up. Stephen Butler, lead vocals and lead guitar, Cliff Hillis, rhythm guitar and vocals, David Uosikkinen, drums, Wally Smith, keyboards and Fran Smith Jr on bass and vocals. In 2010, Smash Palace released 7, a full length CD. In 2012, the band released Do It Again and with the current line up, recorded Live at the Auction House in 2013, Extended Play in 2014, Some Kind of Magic in 2016 and the most recent release was Right As Rain released in 2018. All of the CDs were released on Zip Records owned by Arthur Herman. Brian Butler writes, records and co produces the CDs along with brother Steve Butler and on occasion, appears live with the band.

== Band members ==
=== Original 1985 line-up ===
- Brian Butler - lead vocals
- Stephen Butler - lead guitar & vocals
- Don Merlino - guitar & vocals
- Greg Persun - guitar
- Phil Rizzo - bass
- Harry Lewis - drums
- Greg DiDonato - keyboards (Joined band in Feb. 1986)

=== 1999 line-up ===
- Stephen Butler - lead vocals & lead guitar
- Brian Butler - drums & vocals
- DyAnne DiSalvo - rhythm guitar & vocals
- Phil Rizzo - bass
- Greg DiDonato - keyboards

=== 2004 line-up ===
- Stephen Butler - lead vocals & lead guitar
- Anthony Bezich - drums
- DyAnne DiSalvo - rhythm guitar & vocals
- Phil Rizzo - bass
- Greg DiDonato - keyboards

=== 2012 line-up ===
- Stephen Butler - lead vocals & guitar
- Phil Rizzo - rhythm guitar
- Fran Smith - bass
- Greg Didonato - drums
- Wally Smith - keyboards

=== 2014 line-up ===
- Stephen Butler - lead vocals & guitar
- Cliff Hillis - rhythm guitar
- Fran Smith - bass
- David Uosikkinen - drums
- Wally Smith - keyboards

=== Current line-up ===
- Stephen Butler - lead vocals & guitar
- Cliff Hillis - rhythm guitar
- David Uosikkinen - drums
- Wally Smith - keyboards
- Greg Maragos - bass

== Discography ==
- Smash Palace (1985 - Epic Records) Note: This album was only released on LP and cassette.
- Fast, Long, Loud (1999 - Imagine Records)
- Unlocked (2001 - Back Porch Records)
- Over the Top (2004 - Smash Palace Studios)
- Best Of '99-'06 (2006 - Zip Records)
- Everybody Comes and Goes (2008 - Zip Records)
- 7 (2010 - Zip Records)
- Do It Again (2012 - Zip Records)
- Live at the Auction House (2012 - Zip Records)
- Extended Play (2014 - Zip Records)
- Some Kind of Magic (2015 - Zip Records)
- Right as Rain (2018 - Zip Records)
- 21 (2021 - In The Pocket)
