= Ron Israel =

American football player (born 1978)

No. 37, 25
- Position: Safety

Personal information
- Born: January 5, 1978 (age 48); Voorhees Township, New Jersey, U.S.
- Listed height: 6 ft 0 in (1.83 m)
- Listed weight: 212 lb (96 kg)

Career information
- High school: Haddon Heights (Haddon Heights, New Jersey)
- College: Notre Dame
- NFL draft: 2002: undrafted

Career history
- Washington Redskins (2002)*; Minnesota Vikings (2003); Cleveland Browns (2003); Denver Broncos (2004)*; Pittsburgh Steelers (2005); → Amsterdam Admirals (2005)
- * Offseason or practice squad member only

Awards and highlights
- World Bowl champion (2005)
- Stats at Pro Football Reference

Ron Israel (born January 5, 1978) is an American former professional football safety who played for the Minnesota Vikings of the National Football League (NFL). He played college football for the Notre Dame Fighting Irish.

== Early life ==
Ron Israel was born on January 5, 1978, in Voorhees Township, New Jersey. Raised in Lawnside, New Jersey, he played high school football at Haddon Heights High School in Haddon Heights, New Jersey. He posted 104 tackles and eight interceptions as a senior in 1996, earning Philadelphia Inquirer All-South Jersey honors.

== College career ==
Israel enrolled at the University of Notre Dame to play college football for the Fighting Irish. He redshirted the 1997 season and played for the Irish from 1998 to 2001. He recorded three interception for 41 yards during his college career, all coming in 2000. Israel missed most of his senior year due to a hamstring injury.

== Professional career ==
After going undrafted in the 2002 NFL draft, Israel signed with the Washington Redskins on April 24, 2002. He was waived on August 26, 2002, after the fourth of five preseason games.

Israel was signed by the Minnesota Vikings on April 7, 2003. He was waived on August 31 and re-signed on September 9. He played in one game for the Vikings, posting one solo tackle on special teams. Israel was waived on September 22, 2003. He was listed as a safety while with the Vikings.

On September 24, 2003, the Cleveland Browns signed Israel to the team's practice squad. He was released on September 30 but signed to the practice squad again on December 3. He was promoted to the active roster on December 10. Israel did not play in any games for the Browns and was waived on December 23, 2003.

Israel signed a reserve/future contract with the Denver Broncos on December 31, 2003. He was waived by the Broncos on August 31, 2004, after the fourth of five preseason games.

Israel was signed by the Pittsburgh Steelers on February 15, 2005, and allocated to NFL Europe to play for the Amsterdam Admirals. He started all ten games at free safety for the Admirals during the 2005 NFL Europe season, posting 45 defensive tackles, 11 special teams tackles, one interception, four pass breakups, and one sack. The Admirals finished the year with a 6–4 record. In World Bowl XIII, Israel and Norman LeJeune deflected a Berlin Thunder pass in the end zone as time expired, securing a 27–21 Amsterdam victory. On September 3, 2005, before the start of the NFL regular season, Israel was placed on the Steelers' NFL Europe reserve/non-football injury list. He was released by Pittsburgh on February 23, 2006.

== Personal life ==
Israel's older brother, Steve, also played in the NFL.
