= Bo Wood =

American football player and coach (born 1945)

No. 81
- Position: Defensive end

Personal information
- Born: January 24, 1945 (age 81); Camden, New Jersey, U.S.
- Listed height: 6 ft 3 in (1.91 m)
- Listed weight: 235 lb (107 kg)

Career information
- High school: Haddon Heights (Haddon Heights, New Jersey)
- College: North Carolina (1963-1966)
- NFL draft: 1967: 6th round, 159th overall pick

Career history
- New Orleans Saints (1967)*; Atlanta Falcons (1967)
- * Offseason or practice squad member only

Career NFL statistics
- Sacks: 1.5
- Stats at Pro Football Reference

Charles Henry "Bo" Wood (born January 24, 1945) is an American former professional football player and high school coach. He played for the Atlanta Falcons in 1967 and coached the Cherry Hill East Cougars high school team for 33 years.

== Early life ==
Bo Wood was born on January 24, 1945, in Camden, New Jersey, and grew up in Barrington, New Jersey. He attended Haddon Heights High School, where he garnered All-South Jersey recognition in track, swimming and football. He earned 11 varsity letters overall during high school.

== College career ==
Wood went to college at North Carolina. In 1964 he had 4 catches for 44 yards. In 1966 he was an All-American selection.

== Professional career ==
In 1967, Wood was selected 159th overall in the sixth round by the New Orleans Saints. He made the roster but was traded to the Atlanta Falcons right before the season started. Wood played in all 14 games for the Falcons but only one statistic was recorded; a 9 yard kick return. He did not make the roster in 1968. In 1969, he was signed by a Canadian Football League team but did not play for them.

== Later life ==
After his playing career, he went back to college to get a master's degree. He then was a High School coach for more than 30 years. He first started at Bishop Eustace but then went to the Cherry Hill East Cougars and was there for 33 seasons. 3 players he coached went to the NFL; Pete Kugler, Glenn Foley, and Stan Clayton. In 1988 they won the state championship. In 1987 he was inducted into the New Jersey Coaches Hall of Fame. In 2018 he was inducted into the Cherry Hill East Athletics Hall of Fame.
