= Mary Chalmers =

American author and illustrator

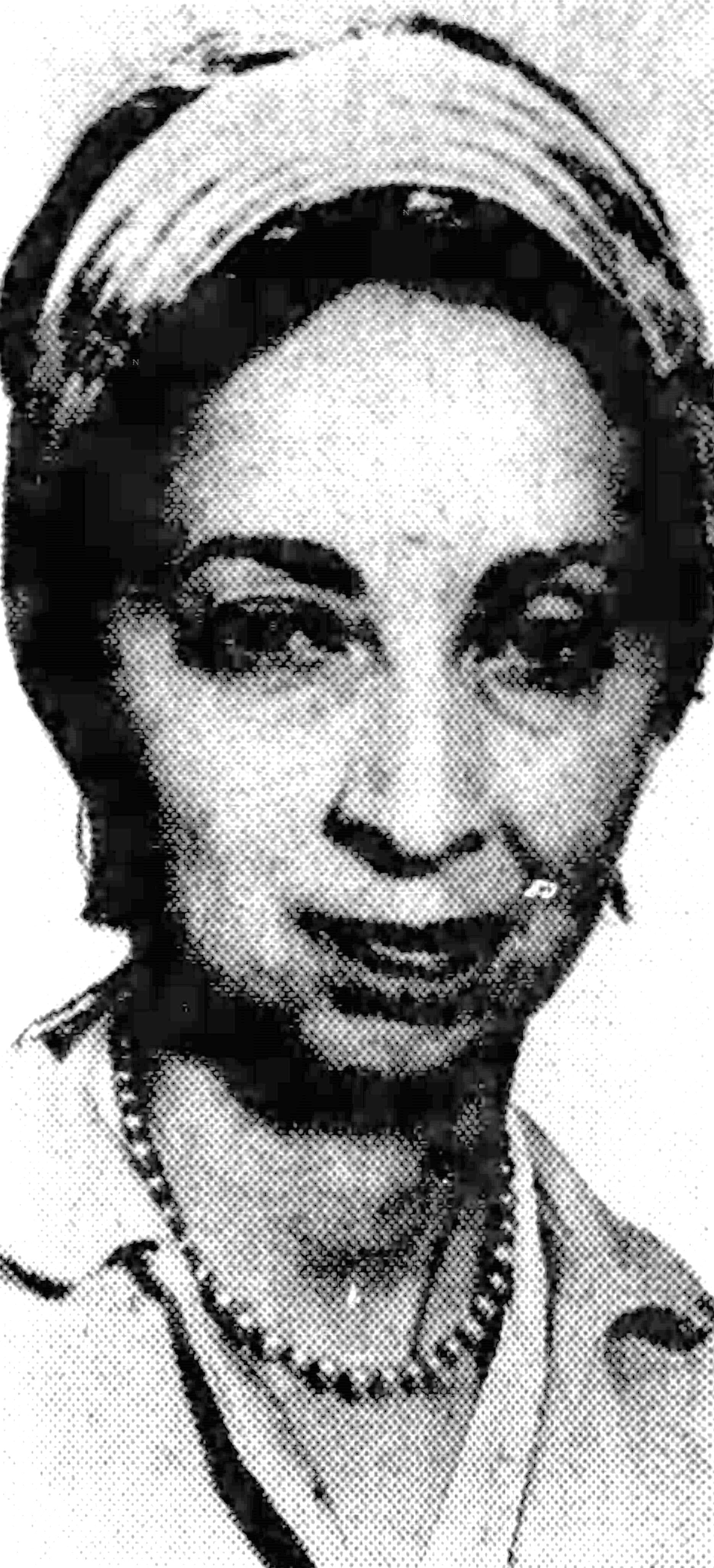
Chalmers in 1967

Mary Eileen Chalmers (born March 16, 1927) is an American author and illustrator who has written children's books frequently featuring cats from the 1950s through the 1980s. She is known for her books about Harry, an anthropomorphic cat. Her books were well known for featuring her own illustrations in addition to the written text, including a unique complex layout with full pages of text and drawings woven throughout the pages and within the margins. She also provided illustrations for many other authors' books, especially those involving animals.

== Career ==
Born in Camden, New Jersey, on March 16, 1927, Chalmers developed an early interest in art due to her sister becoming an artist. Raised in Haddon Heights, New Jersey, Chalmers graduated from Haddon Heights High in 1944 and obtained a four-year degree in painting at the Philadelphia Museum College of Art. During her college years, she sold several of her city and landscape watercolors, aiming to become a professional artist after graduation. She then was hired as an artist for the magazines Holiday and Jack and Jill. Her work for these children's magazines raised her interest in writing her own children's story and worked on her own time designing characters and storylines.

The stories she wrote were repeatedly rejected by publishers before she received attention in 1954 from Harper & Brothers for her first published story, Come for a Walk With Me. Published in March 1955, it sold 6000 copies within three months. She soon published Here Comes the Trolley Car the same year and A Hat for Amy Jean in 1956, with several more books already on contract. All of the books featured not only Chalmers' writing, but also her personally made illustrations. They stood out from other children's books at the time by not being primarily illustrations with a line or two of story per page, but instead had illustrations woven throughout and within the borders and margins, alongside complete pages of written story.

After several more books published in 1957, Chalmers found herself in a period without ideas for new stories. The director of children's books for her publisher Harper & Row, Ursula Nordstrom, sent her a note praising Here Comes the Trolley Car. Touched by the message, Chalmers sent back a multi-page thank you note that featured a kitten blowing a kiss. Nordstrom suggested that the kitten be turned into a book itself, leading to Chalmers writing the first volume in her Harry the anthropomorphic kitten series, Throw A Kiss, Harry. By 1967 and several books into the series, along with other cat-focused books, Chalmers ended up owning ten cats and a Pomeranian dog. These pets assisted in her drawing of poses for the cats in her illustrations.

Chalmers donated a collection of her illustrations, sketches, layouts, and dummy books to the University of Southern Mississippi in 1998.

== Books ==
- — (1955). Come for a Walk With Me. Harper.
- — (1955). Here Comes the Trolley Car. Harper. p. 32.
- — (1956). A Hat for Amy Jean. Harper & Brothers.
- — (1956). A Christmas Story. HarperCollins Canada. p. 24. ISBN 9780064431569.
- — (1957). George Appleton. Harper & Brothers. p. 32.
- — (1957). Kevin. Harper & Brothers.
- — (1958). Throw a Kiss, Harry. HarperCollins. p. 32. ISBN 9780064430302.
- — (1958). Boats Finds a House. Harper & Brothers. p. 32.
- — (1959). The Cat Who Liked to Pretend. Harper & Brothers. ISBN 9780060211806.
- — (1961). Mr. Cat's Wonderful Surprise. Harper & Row.
- — (1964). Take a Nap, Harry. HarperCollins. p. 32. ISBN 9780060212445.
- — (1967). Be Good, Harry. Harper & Row. p. 32. ISBN 9780064430272.
- — (1977). Merry Christmas, Harry. HarperCollins. p. 31. ISBN 9780060227425.
- — (1981). Come to the Doctor, Harry. Harper & Row. p. 32. ISBN 9780590758239.
- — (1986). Six Dogs, Twenty-three Cats, Forty-five Mice, and One Hundred Sixteen Spiders. Harper & Row. p. 32. ISBN 9780060211882.
- — (1988). Easter Parade. Harper & Row. p. 32. ISBN 9780064432191.

=== Illustrator ===
- The Secret Language by Ursula Nordstrom (1960)
- Big Brother by Charlotte Zolotow (1960)
- The Happy Birthday Present by Joan Heilbroner (1962)
- Marigold and Grandma on the Town by Stephanie Calmenson (1994)
- Three to Get Ready by Betty Doyle Boegehold (1965)
- Crystal Tree by Jennie D. Lindquist (1966)
- Goodnight, Andrew, Goodnight, Craig by Marjorie Sharmat (1969)
- When Will It Snow? by Syd Hoff (1971)
- Letitia Rabbit's String Song by Russell Hoban (1973)
- Crickety Cricket!: The Best-Loved Poems of James S. Tippett (1973)
- The Snuggle Bunny by Nancy Jewell (1972)
- The day after Christmas by Alice Bach (1975)
- Oh No, Cat! by Janice May Udry
- Mule in the Mail by Stephen Manes (1978)
- When Daisies Pied, and Violets Blue: Songs from Shakespeare by William Shakespeare (1974)
- Home at Last: A Young Cat's Tale by Patricia Lauber (1980)
