= Ghostheads =

2016 Canadian documentary film

- Directed by: Brendan Mertens
- Produced by: Tommy Avallone; Derrick Kunzer; Lee Leshen
- Starring: Dan Aykroyd; Ivan Reitman; Sigourney Weaver; Paul Feig; William Atherton; Ernie Hudson; Kurt Fuller
- Cinematography: Derrick Kunzer
- Edited by: Brendan Mertens, Tommy Avallone
- Music by: John Avarese
- Distributed by: Netflix
- Release date: July 15, 2016
- Running time: 75 minutes
- Countries: Canada; United States
- Language: English

Ghostheads is a 2016 documentary film about Ghostbusters fans, produced by Tommy Avallone and directed by Brendan Mertens. It features Dan Aykroyd, Ivan Reitman, Sigourney Weaver, and Paul Feig. Ghostheads was mainly funded by Indiegogo and Kickstarter campaigns. The film premiered as a Work-in-Progress at the 2016 Tribeca Film Festival and became available on Netflix in July 2016.

== History ==
Film production started in the fall of 2015. It was partially crowdfunded: a Indiegogo campaign started on October 29, 2015, and a Kickstarter campaign was launched on February 11, 2016.

In April 2016, Ghostheads premiered as a Work in Progress at the 2016 Tribeca Film Festival. At the end of June 2016 it was announced that Ghostheads will premiere on Netflix on July 15. The term Ghosthead was coined by Norman "Paranorman" Gagnon on July 3, 1996.

== Plot ==
The film documents the Ghostbusters fan community, presented mainly through the story of New Jersey resident Tom Gebhardt. In general, the documentary shows how Ghostbusters film affection helped various people through life.

== Reception ==
The film was highly anticipated by the Ghostbusters film fans, however, some of them were critical to the very idea of making such a film. A popular critical comment to the film was that its subjects were almost overwhelmingly white and male.
