= Eric Stokes (composer) =

American classical composer (1930–1999)

Eric Stokes (1930 – March 16, 1999) was a composer whose work spanned an eclectic range of influences and styles.

Stokes was born in Haddon Heights, New Jersey, about ten miles southeast of Philadelphia. His mother was a fine vocalist and the early artistic influence in his life. Stokes studied piano at an early age and began composing on his own in high school. He held degrees in music from Lawrence College in Appleton, Wisconsin, the New England Conservatory of Music in Boston, and the University of Minnesota in Minneapolis, where he taught for 29 years.

While at the University of Minnesota, Stokes founded the school’s electronic music laboratory and championed the development of contemporary music by starting the First Minnesota Moving and Storage Warehouse Band. His early compositions were tonal and lyrical while his later compositions were more heavily influenced by Charles Ives, John Cage, and Henry Brant and used American music idioms and unconventional sounds in juxtaposed styles.

Stokes is best remembered for his seven operas, many of which premiered at the Minnesota Opera. His first opera, Horspfal, is a collage of voices, instruments, and film requiring up to five different conductors. Stokes’ Rock & Roll (Phonic Paradigm I) calls for rocks to be hit together and rolled across the stage. His music was a reflection of his life and personality: eccentric and humorous with an ability to blur the lines between fantasy and reality.

== Death ==
He died in an auto accident on Interstate Hwy. 94 at 11th St. in downtown Minneapolis. According to police reports, Stokes was driving west on 94 from Saint Paul when he collided with a highway repair vehicle parked on the shoulder.
