= Miss December =

- Directed by: Derek Lindeman
- Written by: Faith Brody
- Produced by: John Guarnere; Tommy Avallone; Anne Qualteri; Frank Williams
- Starring: Jensen Bucher (aka Jensen Jacobs; Nick Troy; Jake Matthews; Gilbert Gottfried; Corbin Bernsen; Brian O'Halloran
- Production company: Double Windsor Films
- Distributed by: SModcast Pictures
- Release date: 2011
- Country: United States

Miss December (aka Calendar Girl) is a 2011 dark romantic comedy directed by Derek Lindeman and written by Faith Brody. Jensen Bucher plays Ari, a waitress who believes she may be the next victim of a serial killer.

== Plot ==
The "Calendar Girl Killer" has been murdering a different girl in Philadelphia every month and sending their photos to the press in pin-up style poses. After a taunting letter to the press describing his future "Miss December", a waitress named Ari believes he has selected her and finds it flattering rather than horrifying and attempts to figure out who her "secret admirer" may be.

== Production ==
The story originated as a 2002 one-act play by Brody called Christmas Eve. It was later adapted into the 2006 short film titled Calendar Girl, before being adapted into the feature-length 2012 film, Miss December by Double Windsor Films.

== Film festivals ==
Festival	Award	Year
Woods Hole Film Festival	Best Comedy Feature	2011
First Glance Film Festival Philadelphia	Best Director (Derek Lindeman)	2011
First Glance Film Festival Philadelphia	Best in Fest	2011
Philadelphia Cinefest	Best Festival of Independents Film	2011
Hoboken International Film Festival	Best Actress (Jensen Bucher)	2011
Hoboken International Film Festival	Best Feature Film	2011

== Reception ==
Ain't It Cool News wrote "MISS DECEMBER has a nice black soul and is definitely worth checking out for those in the mood for a little humor in the shade of pitch."
