= Tommy Avallone =

American actor, director, and producer

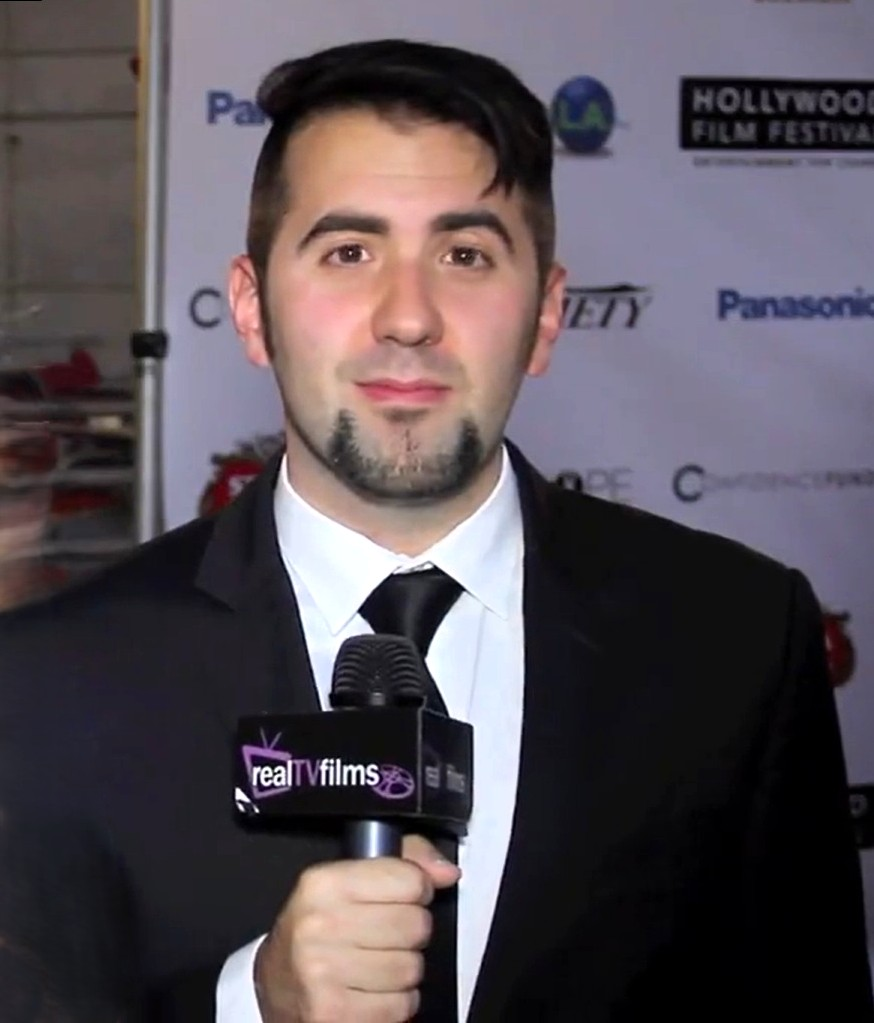
- Avallone in 2014
- Born: Haddon Heights, New Jersey
- Occupations: Actor; director; writer; editor; producer
- Years active: 2006–present

Tommy Avallone is an American film director and producer. He is best known for his work on the documentaries I Am Santa Claus, The Bill Murray Stories: Life Lessons Learned from a Mythical Man and Waldo on Weed.

== Life and career ==
Avallone was born and raised in Haddon Heights, New Jersey and graduated from Haddon Heights High School in 2001. At the age of 20 years he was running for mayor of his hometown.

Avallone's debut feature documentary, I Am Santa Claus, premiered at the Hollywood Film Festival, in 2014. In 2018, he directed the feature documentary, The Bill Murray Stories: Life Lessons Learned from a Mythical Man. It had its international premiere at Hot Docs and was nominated at American Film Festival. In 2019, he directed the feature documentary, Waldo on Weed, premiered at the Tribeca Film Festival, and was nominated at the Philadelphia Film Festival.

In 2021, he directed and co-produced a two-part docuseries on Barney the Dinosaur entitled I Love You, You Hate Me with Scout Productions. The docuseries premiered on Peacock on October 12, 2022.

== Filmography ==
Year	Title	Writer	Director	Editor	Producer	Note
2009	Community College	✗	✓	✓	✓	Feature film
2009	No Footing	✗	✗	✗	✓	Feature film
2011	Miss December	✗	✗	✗	✓	Feature film
2012	Mancation	✗	✗	✗	✓	Feature film
2014	I Am Santa Claus	✗	✓	✓	✓	Documentary
2016	Ghostheads	✗	✗	✓	✓	Documentary
2018	The Bill Murray Stories: Life Lessons Learned from a Mythical Man	✓	✓	✓	✓	Documentary
2019	Waldo on Weed	✗	✓	✓	✓	Documentary
2022	I Love You, You Hate Me	✗	✓	✓	✓	Docuseries

As Actor

- 2006 - 24 Hour Diner
- 2008 - The Editor
- 2008 - Scene In
- 2009 - Community College
- 2009 - No Footing
- 2010 - Living in 8 Bits
- 2011 - Our Footloose Remake
- 2011 - Miss December
- 2012 - Mancation
- 2014 - Our RoboCop Remake
