= Jeff Jones (outfielder) =

American baseball player (born 1957)

- Outfielder
- Born: October 22, 1957 (age 68); Philadelphia, Pennsylvania, U.S.
- Batted: Right Threw: Right

MLB debut
- April 4, 1983, for the Cincinnati Reds

Last MLB appearance
- April 24, 1983, for the Cincinnati Reds

MLB statistics
- Batting average: .227
- Home runs: 0
- Runs batted in: 5
- Stats at Baseball Reference

Teams
- Cincinnati Reds (1983)

Jeffrey Raymond Jones (born October 22, 1957) is an American former professional baseball player who appeared in 16 Major League games as an outfielder, pinch hitter and first baseman for the 1983 Cincinnati Reds. He threw and batted right-handed, stood 6 feet 2 inches (1.88 m) tall and weighed 200 pounds (91 kg).

Raised in Haddon Heights, New Jersey, Jones played prep baseball at Haddon Heights Junior/Senior High School.

Jones attended the University of Iowa and was selected by Cincinnati in the 20th round of the 1979 Major League Baseball draft. In 1982, his fourth pro season, he led the Class A Midwest League in home runs (42), drove in 101 runs, and was selected to the All-Star team. He began the 1983 season on the Reds' Major League roster and started 13 games as a right fielder, left fielder and first baseman during a three-week April stretch. But he collected only ten hits in 44 at bats, with three doubles, no home runs, 11 bases on balls and 13 strikeouts. His best games came April 9 against the Chicago Cubs, when he went 2-for-3, and on April 17, when he netted three hits in three at bats against the San Francisco Giants.

He was sent back to the minors after April 24, and played through the 1985 season. He hit 125 homers as a minor leaguer, but struck out 749 times in 694 games.
