= Col. Joseph Ellis House =

Historic house in New Jersey, United States

- U.S. National Register of Historic Places
- New Jersey Register of Historic Places
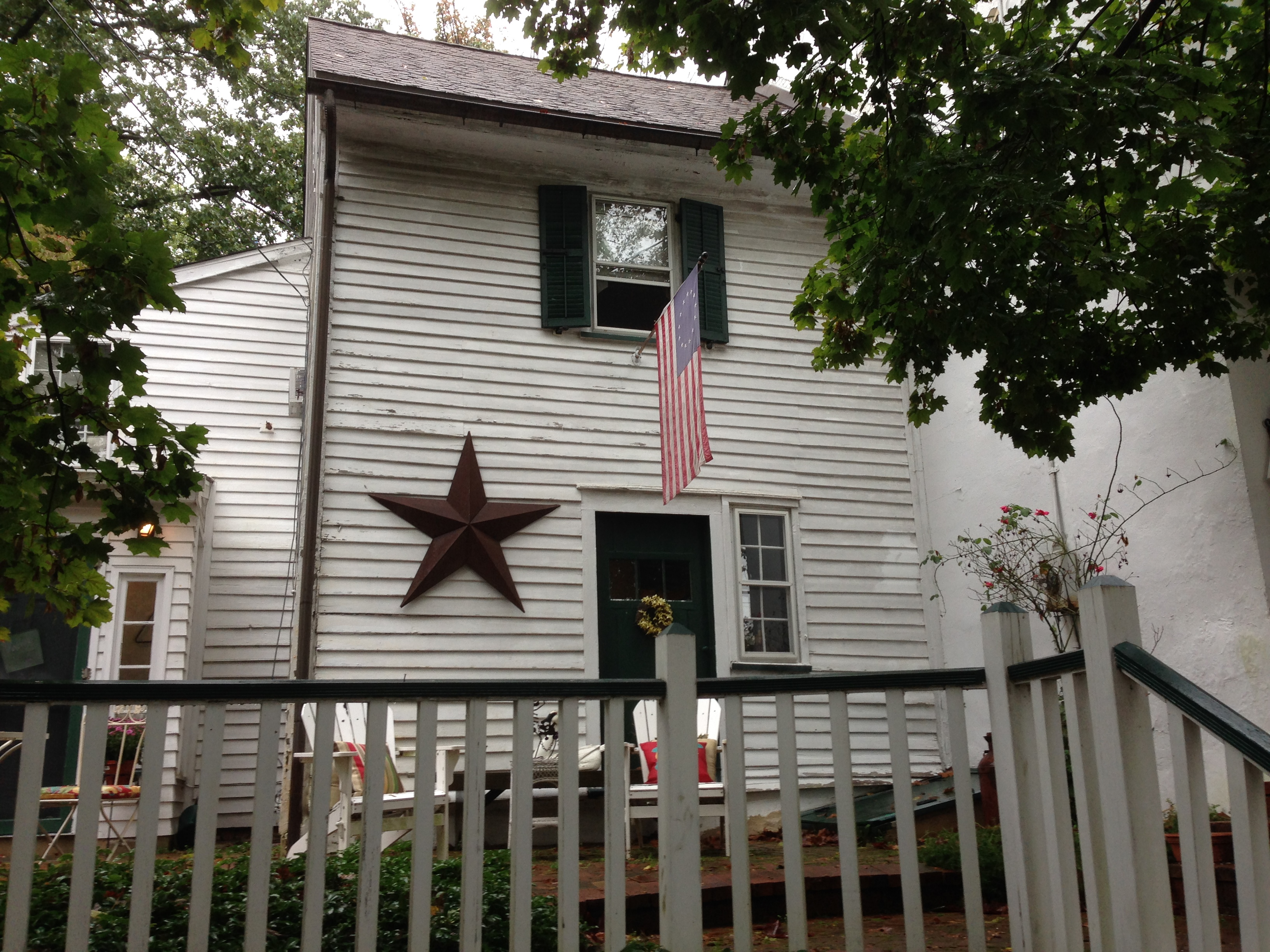
- Structure that currently sits on the site of the Col. Joseph Ellis House

- Location within Camden County, New Jersey Location within New Jersey Location within the United States
- Location: 1009 Sycamore Street, Haddon Heights, New Jersey
- Coordinates: 39.8765°N 75.0627°W
- Built: 1760
- Architectural style: Georgian
- MPS: Haddon Heights Pre-Revolutionary Houses MPS
- NRHP reference No.: 94001110
- NJRHP No.: 961

Significant dates
- Added to NRHP: September 23, 1994
- Designated NJRHP: February 28, 1990

The Col. Joseph Ellis House is located at 1009 Sycamore Street in Haddon Heights, Camden County, New Jersey, United States. The house was built in 1760, and was the dwelling of Revolutionary War hero Colonel Joseph Ellis. It was added to the National Register of Historic Places on September 23, 1994, for its significance in architecture and military history. It is part of the Haddon Heights Pre-Revolutionary Houses Multiple Property Submission (MPS)

== History ==
The Col. Joseph Ellis House derives primary significance as the residence of Joseph Ellis (d. 1796), a political officeholder and important commander of local militia during the American Revolution. Born in Ellisburg, Gloucester (now Camden) County, Ellis married Mary, daughter of Jacob Hinchman, in 1760. The couple lived in this house.

The house stands on land that belonged to John Hinchman, Sr., then, after his death, to Jacob Hinchman his youngest son.

== See also ==
- National Register of Historic Places listings in Camden County, New Jersey
- Haddon Heights, New Jersey
- Hinchman-Lippincott House
