= The Bill Murray Stories: Life Lessons Learned from a Mythical Man =

2018 documentary film directed by Tommy Avallone

- Film poster
- Directed by: Tommy Avallone
- Written by: Tommy Avallone; Max Paolucci
- Produced by: Raymond Esposito; Max Paolucci; Derrick Kunzer; Kevin Sisti Jr.
- Starring: Tommy Avallone; John Barnhardt; Christopher Beaumont
- Cinematography: Derrick Kunzer
- Edited by: Tommy Avallone
- Music by: John Avarese
- Production companies: Double Windsor Films; Old Lime Productions
- Release date: March 10, 2018 (South by Southwest)
- Running time: 70 minutes
- Country: United States
- Language: English

The Bill Murray Stories: Life Lessons Learned from a Mythical Man is a 2018 American documentary film written, edited and directed by Tommy Avallone.

== Plot ==
The film explores and investigates several urban legends surrounding American actor and comedian Bill Murray.

== Cast ==
- Tommy Avallone
- John Barnhardt
- Christopher Beaumont

== Reception ==
The review aggregator website Rotten Tomatoes reported a 95% approval rating based on 21 reviews.

Peter Howell of the Toronto Star gave the film 3 out of 4 stars, stating: "The Bill Murray Stories: Life Lessons Learned From a Mythical Man addresses the very real title star’s amusingly bizarre habit of casually barging into regular lives." Richard Roeper, writing for the Chicago Sun-Times, gave The Bill Murray Stories 3.5 out of 4 stars. John DeFore from The Hollywood Reporter called it "an enjoyable but hardly essential pop-culture exploration".
