= Kristin Hunter =

American writer

- Born: Kristin Elaine Eggleston; September 12, 1931; Philadelphia, Pennsylvania, USA
- Died: November 14, 2008 (aged 77)
- Education: Haddon Heights High School
- Writing career
- Pen name: Kristin Hunter Lattany

Kristin Elaine Hunter (née Eggleston; September 12, 1931 – November 14, 2008) was an African-American writer from Pennsylvania. She sometimes wrote under the name Kristin Hunter Lattany. She is best known for her first novel, God Bless the Child, published in 1964.

== Early life and education ==
On September 12, 1931, Kristin Elaine Eggleston was born in Philadelphia, to George L. and Mabel (née Manigault) Eggleston. Her father held positions as a school principal and army officer, and her mother worked as a teacher and pharmacist. She attended Charles Sumner School and Magnolia Public School in Philadelphia before graduating from Haddon Heights High School in 1947. She then earned a Bachelor of Science from the University of Pennsylvania in 1951. Eggleston became a writer when she was fourteen years old after publishing a column in the Pittsburgh Courier, a newspaper whose readership is located in Philadelphia, and continued doing so until 1952. She then worked for some time as a teacher at an elementary school in Camden, New Jersey, and resigned to become a full-time writer and advertiser.

Journalism and Professional Career

In addition to her role as an author, Hunter also had a wide-ranging professional life in media and communication circles. After leaving teaching after just a short while, she joined the advertising profession, working as a copywriter with the Lavenson Bureau of Advertising in Philadelphia between 1952 and 1959. The period was noteworthy because of the rarity of African American female copywriters at that time in the mainstream advertising sector.

Apart from her work in advertising, Hunter worked as a research assistant at the University of Pennsylvania's School of Social Work between 1961 and 1962, and as a public information officer for the City of Philadelphia between 1965 and 1966.Her background in journalism was not overlooked either since she continued to publish articles and reviews in journals like the Pittsburgh Courier, The Nation, and The New York Times Book Review. This gave her an insight into the relationship between public policy, social services, and media, themes that she often portrayed in her fictional stories about black urban life.

== Career ==
Hunter became a columnist for the Pittsburgh Courier at age 14, a position she held for nearly eight years. This journalistic foundation heavily influenced her later prose, giving her a keen eye for social reporting.

Hunter's first novel, God Bless the Child, was published in 1964, and won the Athenaeum Literary Award. Like most of her work, it confronts issues of race and gender.

Her 1966 novel, The Landlord, was made into a movie by Hal Ashby (United Artists, 1970). It is often cited as a key instance of the intersection of Black literature and the New Hollywood cinema‚ and marked the directorial debut of American director Hal Ashby․ It was also produced by Norman Jewison, with the screenplay written by Bill Gunn․ Gunn's script has been noted for maintaining the sharp‚ satirical quality of Hunter's prose while adapting her urban realism to the experimental and avant-garde style of early cinema․

Her 1973 collection of short stories, Guests in the Promised Land, was nominated for the National Book Award.

In 1955, Hunter gained national attention when her television script, Minority of One, won a prestigious writing contest. However, the production became a landmark case of mid-century media censorship. Television executives, fearing backlash from advertisers and Southern viewers, rewrote Hunter's script to change the Black protagonist into a white French immigrant. This experience with racial gatekeeping in the media informed much of her later work, particularly her focus on the necessity of authentic Black representation and the systemic hurdles faced by African American intellectuals.

In 1972 Hunter began teaching in the English department at the University of Pennsylvania, retiring from the university in 1995. She was also a visiting professor at Emory University. She received the Moonstone Black Writing Celebration Lifetime Achievement Award in 1996.

Commenting on her own work, she said,

The bulk of my work has dealt—imaginatively, I hope—with relations between the white and black races in America. My early work was 'objective,' that is, sympathetic to both whites and blacks, and seeing members of both groups from a perspective of irony and humor against the wider backdrop of human experience as a whole. Since about 1968 my subjective anger has been emerging, along with my grasp of the real situation in this society, though my sense of humor and my basic optimism keep cropping up like uncontrollable weeds.

== Themes and Literary Style ==
Hunter’s work has traditionally been seen as that of an author who makes use of elements of urban realism and social satire. In most of Hunter’s novels, one finds an analysis of social structures and class division within the Black community, an aspect that, according to Yolanda Williams Page, was influenced by Hunter’s middle-class upbringing and profession.

Hunter explored issues related to identity and interracial relationships in works intended for both adults and younger audiences. As Hunter told Claudia Tate, many of her books revolve around “the middle-class Black person’s quest for identity.” According to one critic, Hunter’s first novel, The Landlord, serves as an example of how Black literature began merging with the new wave of cinema dubbed the “New Hollywood.”

In addition to creative work, Hunter devoted much of her time to criticism, examining aspects of popular culture in her article “Why Buckwheat Was Shot,” published in 1984.

Legacy

Kristin Hunter made an important impact on making a difference in her community. She used her audience's experiences to show different perspectives in her work. Hunter enjoyed writing books for children and teenagers, because she felt as they could easily relate to her stories. One of her novels that helped the younger people the most was The Soul Brothers and Sister Lou. This novel helped the most, because it was taught in education systems. Hunter also influenced so many of her students as she taught at The University of Pennsylvania. Her hard work as writer has made an important impact in many communities, and is also talked about today.

== Awards and Achievements ==
Awards were given to Kristin Hunter in recognition of her literary and professional achievements. The book titled God Bless the Child published in 1964 won the Philadelphia Athenaeum Literary Award. In 1968, she won another award titled the National Council on Interracial Books for Children Award for her literary piece called The Soul Brothers and Sister Lou, which was later awarded the Lewis Carroll Shelf Award in 1971.

The book “Guests in the Promised Land” (1973) earned her many accolades, including the nomination for the National Book Award and a Christopher Award (1974). Some of the other honors that have been bestowed on her include the fellowship of New Jersey State Council on the Arts (1981-82) and Drexel Children’s Literature Citation (1981). Her contribution to the field of literature and education has been recognized through the Moonstone Black Writing Celebration Lifetime Achievement Award (1996) and Chisholm Award from the Philadelphia Congress of the National Political Congress of Black

== Urban realism ==
Hunter is recognized as a pioneer of urban realism, a style that centers the experiences of African Americans within Northern cityscapes, particularly Philadelphia.Unlike many of her contemporaries who focused solely on the trauma of the ghetto, Lattany’s work, notably in The Landlord (1966), used satire and caricature to explore the complexities of class within the Black community. Different analysis from critics like Trudier Harris suggests that Lattany viewed the urban environment not just as a setting of struggle, but as a site of community resilience and inner strength.

Her shift toward young adult literature with The Soul Brothers and Sister Lou (1968) marked a significant evolution in her style. She began using her background in elementary education to create "pedagogical fiction," where the narrative serves as a tool for social organization and identity formation for Black youth. By blending the musicality of the Black Arts Movement with realistic depictions of police-community tensions, Hunter provided a bridge between traditional literature and the politically charged climate of the late 1960s.

== Publications ==
- God Bless the Child, 1964.
- The Landlord, 1966.
- The Soul Brothers and Sister Lou (National Council on Interracial Books for the Children Award), 1968.
- Boss Cat, 1971.
- Guests in the Promised Land (stories; nominated for the National Book Award), 1973.
- The Survivors, 1975.
- The Lakestown Rebellion, 1978.
- Lou in the Limelight, 1981.
- Kinfolks, 1996.
- The Scribe, 1998.
- Do Unto Others, 2000.
- Breaking Away, 2003.
- Mom Luby and the Social Worker ,
