= Bessie Mecklem Hackenberger =

American saxophonist

Bessie Mecklem Hackenberger (19 April 1876 – 5 June 1942) was one of the earliest American-born saxophone soloists. In her teens, she was a student of Edward A. Lefebre (1834–1911), pre-eminent saxophonist of the nineteenth century and soloist with Gilmore and Sousa's bands. During the 1890s, when female woodwind and brass players were uncommon, she performed extensively throughout the northeastern United States with her father, harpist Henry Clay Mecklem (1841–1915). The pair appeared in a wide variety of venues popular during the Gilded Age including lyceum; YMCA and temperance organizations; meetings of fraternal societies, labor organizations, and civic groups; benefit concerts; solos with professional wind bands; and amusement parks. Mecklem recorded twelve wax phonograph cylinders at the Edison Laboratories on 23 April 1892. After her marriage in 1900 to Bertram Lyon Hackenberger (1871–1932), she ceased playing professionally, but continued to perform as an active participant in the Progressive-era women's club movement.

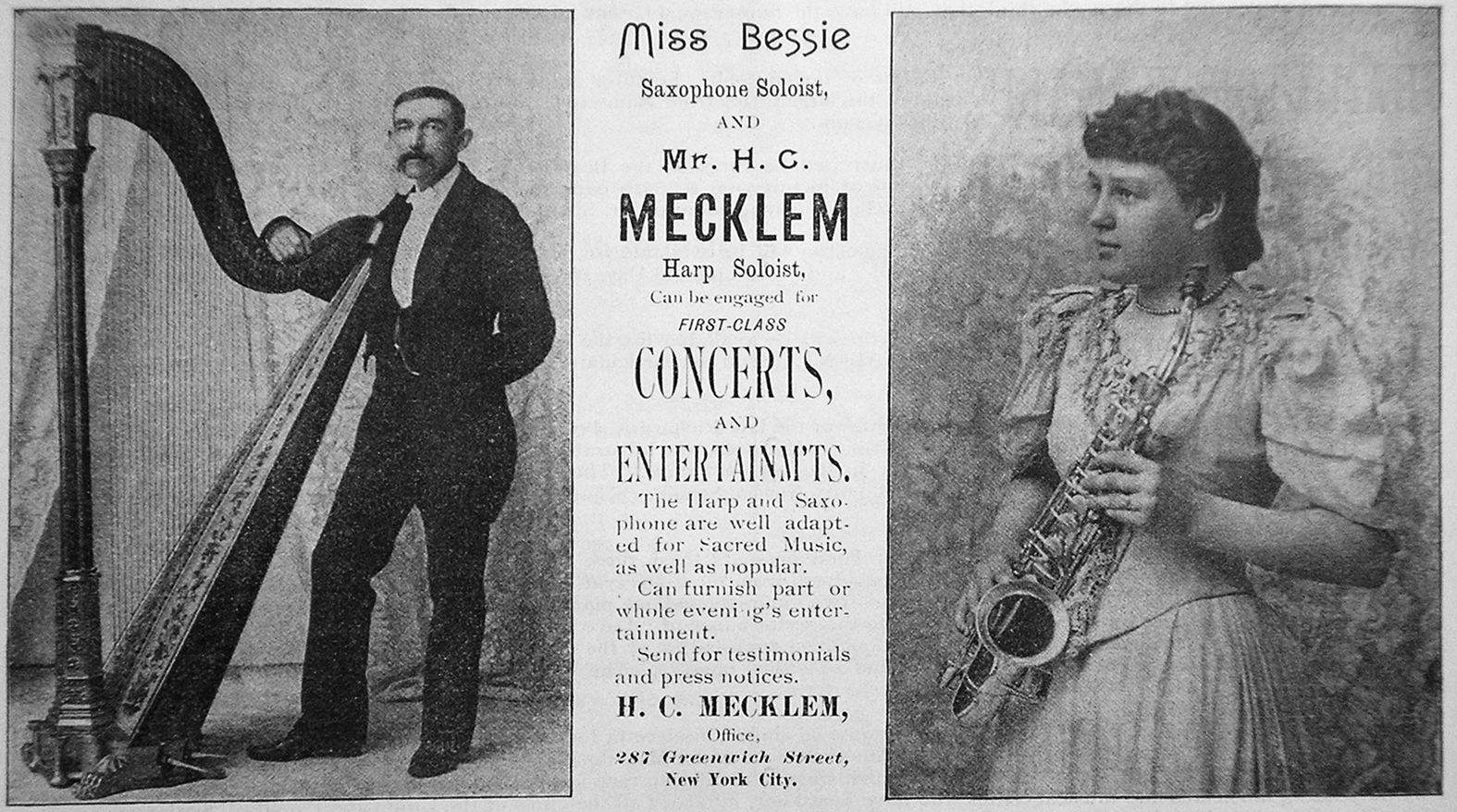

== Professional performing career ==
=== Lyceum ===
Lyceum tours comprised the mainstay of Bessie and H. C. Mecklem's performing itinerary. A lyceum “course” consisted of a series of monthly programs for which audience members purchased a season's subscription. Lyceum programs combined education and entertainment functions, offering “lectures by humorists, as well as dramatic readings, impersonations, concerts, magic acts, and other ‘lighter’ fare.” The Mecklems entered "the lyceum field when musicians first began to appear on its programs on a regular basis." The Mecklems were billed as a saxophone-harp duo. Henry Clay accompanied Bessie on her featured selections in addition to performing his own harp solos. They frequently shared their programs with various dramatic readers or humorists. Other musical soloists, chamber groups, or vocal ensembles were sometimes included. The duo was managed by Alonzo Foster's Star Lyceum Bureau.

The Mecklems occasionally appeared with Foster's New York Stars during the 1891-92 season. From 1892 through 1894, the Mecklems and elocutionist Florence Russell performed as the New York Ideal Trio, sometimes billed as the New York Ideal Concert Company. On 19 May 1892, the New York Ideal Trio shared the program with five other performers in a concert presented at Toronto's Broadway Tabernacle. A review from the Toronto Empire stated,"The duets by Miss Bessie Mecklem and her father, introducing the saxophone and harp, were of peculiar interest to the audience, the two instruments in conjunction being a genuine novelty. The young lady showed much ability and Mr. Mecklem’s harmonious work on the harp was splendidly done." The Mecklems were engaged as part of the Black Patti Concert Company on 10 May 1893, at the Strong Place Baptist Church in South Brooklyn, assisted by humorist Fred Emerson Brooks. The Mecklems’ performances as part of the Black Patti Concert Company were notable in that they resulted in a racially mixed program of performers, a rare situation at the time. The company's featured performer, soprano Sissieretta Jones (1869-1933), became one of the most famous black musicians in America after the Civil War. Jones was known as the “Black Patti” for comparisons of her singing to that of Adelina Patti, one of the nineteenth century's most celebrated opera stars. The Mecklems paired with Walter Pelham, “a distinguished English humorist, poet and mimic elocutionist,” for a tour of lecture courses in western New York during November 1894.

=== YMCA and temperance ===
As part of its programming, the YMCA sponsored lecture and entertainment courses similar to those of the lyceum. Because the audience for YMCA lecture courses comprised mostly young men, as opposed to a more heterogeneous composition in the lyceum, these events tended to have a more consistently moralistic, or motivational, emphasis. YMCA engagements made up the largest portion of the Mecklems’ documented bookings.

H. C. Mecklem was a supporter of the Temperance movement. Five of the Mecklems’ documented performances were associated with anti-alcohol institutions or organizations. One of their earliest engagements included the American Temperance Union's Centennial Day service at Chickering Hall in New York in April 1889. They appeared twice at events sponsored by the New York Temperance Union. On 1 February 1891, “a rare and delightful musical programme” was offered at Masonic Temple in New York City. After the musical selections, Citizen George Francis Train spoke on “The Drink Customs Around the World.” A second engagement, on 21 February 1892, at the Grand Opera House Hall, Twenty-third Street and Eighth Avenue, featured the young Baptist orator Reverend E. S. Halloway. Holloway, pastor of the West Thirty-third Street Church, spoke on the Parkhurst Raid.

=== Fraternal societies, labor organizations, and civic groups ===
Membership in fraternal societies was widespread during the late 1800s, with an estimated participation of as many as one third of American adult males by 1920. Henry Clay Mecklem was among the first members of Longfellow Council, No. 675, of the Royal Arcanum, East Orange, New Jersey. Consequently, "the Mecklems frequently performed for fraternal orders, such as the Royal Arcanum, Order of Tonti, Fraternal Mystic Circle, Freemasons, Odd Fellows, Grand Army of the Republic, Farragut Association, Daughters of the American Revolution, and the Brooklyn Oxford Club. These engagements were nearly equal in number to their lyceum appearances. Social and fraternal organizations provided diversity to the types of performances the Mecklems presented, filled in open dates during tours, and increased their bookings overall." In addition to their work for fraternal organizations, the Mecklems performed during holiday observances and for labor groups. Civic groups that heard the Mecklems included the New York Press Club. The Mecklems also performed at events held by musical societies such as the Richmond, Virginia, Mozart Musicale; the St. Cecelia Society of Hudson, New York; and the Beethoven Choral Society of Newark, New Jersey.

=== Benefit concerts ===
Benefit concerts for various charitable causes, large and small, were an integral part of the Mecklems’ performance schedule. Some of these engagements took place in very prestigious venues. On 22 May 1890, the Mecklems participated in a joint benefit for the Babies’ Ward of the Post Graduate Hospital and for the Actors’ Fund, which took place concurrently at the Metropolitan Opera House and two other New York theaters. Nearly $7,000 was raised. Benefit concerts were often lengthy affairs and featured numerous contributors; before a packed house at the Met that evening, Bessie Mecklem appeared sixteenth on a program of eighteen different acts. In addition to benefits organized in support of a colleague who had fallen ill or experienced financial difficulties, performers often staged events to pay tribute to fellow artists who were completing extended engagements.

The Mecklems donated their services for a number of church benefits. A month after their May 1893 performance with Sissieretta Jones at Strong Place Baptist Church in Brooklyn, they once again appeared with the Black Patti Concert Company. On June 6, they participated in a concert at the Lee Avenue Congregational Church, Brooklyn, to benefit the church's Sunday school. The Mecklems joined the Black Patti Concert Company a third time on June 13, at the Emory M. E. Church in Jersey City, New Jersey. Both June performances featured humorist James S. Burdett.

=== Band concerts and tours ===
In early 1895, the Mecklems participated in two tours with the highly regarded Veteran Corps Band of Baltimore. A January Southern Tour took them through Virginia (to Richmond, Norfolk, with a return engagement to Richmond, then Lynchburg and Roanoke), then on to Pittsburgh and New York City. Their return to Baltimore was followed by a concert in Harrisburg, Pennsylvania. The reviewer of the Norfolk (Va.) Virginian found, "The saxaphone [sic] solos of Miss Bessie Mecklem were artistically performed, and her 'Then You’ll Remember Me,' completely captured the audience. Miss Mecklem is an accomplished soloist, and her number received several encores." In late February-early March 1896, the band swung through Ohio, Pennsylvania, and New Jersey, with a final stop in Philadelphia.

In 1895, H. C. Mecklem reported to Talent that Bessie “played a saxophone solo at Central Park, N. Y., concert with Rogers’ Seventh Regiment Band, July 27 and August 3. On the 27th, her solo received a double encore. Miss Mecklem is the first lady who has ever played before a Park audience."

== Women's club participation ==
At different periods of her married life, Bessie Mecklem Hackenberger participated in both the music-centered and general-purpose women's club formats. From 1902-1904, Hackeberger was a member of The East Orange, New Jersey, Tuesday Musical Club. The Tuesday Musical Club exemplified the women's amateur arts association of the Early Progressive Era. In addition to performing for their colleagues during monthly meetings, the club's members contributed to the community's cultural life by presenting a series of public concerts each season. Although no longer a paid professional musician—as in the years prior to her marriage when she toured in the lyceum—these activities enabled Hackenberger to continue to appear before a public audience on a regular basis. As one of the club's most dynamic members, Hackenberger quickly attained status, succeeding its founder as president, until the demands of her husband's career precluded her from taking office.

The Hackenbergers moved from East Orange to Philadelphia (1904), Baltimore (1910), and Washington, DC (1911) as Bert Hackenberger's career advanced. Bessie did not join a women's club during this time as the family's means were modest and she was raising young children. She began to participate in organizations—such as the Red Cross and the Ladies Aid Society—that contributed to the war effort during World War I. These activities, along with the domestic responsibilities her husband continued to expect of her, did not leave much time for performing on the saxophone. During her time in Washington, Hackenberger was able to perform just a few times each year in benefit concerts, a lyceum course, church services, fraternal society meetings, community events, and assemblies or individual classes of students at her children's schools.

In 1922, the Hackenbergers moved from Washington, DC, to Haddon Heights, a southern-New Jersey suburb with a population of approximately 3,000. Hackenberger soon joined the Haddon Heights Woman's Club, which was divided into various departments that would suit each member's interests and/or level of social engagement. Hackenberger was an active participant, performing regularly at club meetings and social events. Her pursuits during this period correspond with the larger post-war club movement's shift from the goal of self-development to an emphasis on civic reform. As her participation in club activities expanded, music began to take a secondary role to her growing commitment to her community's economic and social welfare as chair of the Legislative, Civics, and Welfare Departments. In recognition of her contributions to the Haddon Heights Woman's Club, members unanimously elected Hackenberger a trustee on 10 April 1931.

== Performing repertoire ==
During the Gilded Age an increasing separation between cultivated and vernacular music occurred. By contrast, in the venues where the Mecklems performed there existed a greater “fluidity and routine intersection between popular and elite culture.” Lyceum and YMCA entertainments, benefit and band concerts still employed the traditional practice of mixing musical genres and of programming an eclectic assortment of works from the cultivated and vernacular traditions. Bessie Mecklem's performing repertoire generally reflected the range of American popular tastes: popular songs, operatic selections (with or without variations), dances (like the waltz or polka), original compositions, and sacred music. Her most frequently performed numbers were sentimental ballads, such as Henry Trotère (1855-1912) and lyricist Clifton Bingham's (1859–1913) song In Old Madrid or Charles Albert White's (1832–1892) Marguerite. “Then You’ll Remember Me” from Michael William Balfe's (1808–1870) opera The Bohemian Girl, follows the nineteenth-century trend of basing a popular song in English upon well-known operatic aria.

In addition to programming arrangements and transcriptions, Mecklem occasionally performed original compositions for saxophone. E. A. Lefebre's Grand Easter Concert, given at the Academy of Music in Brooklyn on 6 April 1890, concluded with Harry Rowe Shelley's (1858-1947) Quartet “The Resurrection,” featuring Lefebre and Mecklem on alto saxophone, with piano and organ accompaniment. Another notable sacred song in Mecklem's repertoire was Chant Religieux by Jules Demersseman, which she performed on 2 July 1891 at the convention of the New York State Teachers’ Musical Association, held in Utica, New York. Mecklem and many other Gilded-Age musicians frequently programmed Jean Fauré’s (1830-1914) The Palms, also known as Palm Branches.

After her marriage in 1900, the music Mrs. B. L. Hackenberger performed on the programs of the East Orange, New Jersey, Tuesday Musical Club focused more on transcriptions of serious compositions from the cultivated tradition rather than the popular and light classical numbers programmed during the lyceum and YMCA concerts of her teenage years. Her performances in Haddon Heights, New Jersey, during the 1920s returned to a reliance on light classics and sentimental songs, closest to the repertoire favored by saxophonists who worked in Chautauqua and lyceum. Although she did not embrace the evolving musical trends of the 1920s—which featured the saxophone's growing prominence in syncopated dance music and jazz—her continued adherence to a cultivated, more genteel repertoire provided continuity to the music most closely associated with the instrument’s origins and early societal role.

== Edison recording session ==
On 23 April 23, 1892, Bessie Mecklem "produced twelve Edison wax cylinders of saxophone solos with piano accompaniment. . . . The titles [she] rendered, probably several times each, were 'Ave Maria,' 'Sweet Lullaby Waltz,' 'Eugenia—Waltz Song,' 'Nightingale Song,' 'Easter Song,' 'Love’s Old Sweet Song,' 'Christmas Song,' 'Grand Fantasie,' 'Dreaming,' 'Afterwards,' 'In Old Madrid,' and 'Palm Branches'—mostly slow-paced and comparatively simple numbers." Although Mecklem was long thought to be the first saxophone soloist to make a phonograph record, "Edward A. Lefebre recorded for Edison, or one of its subsidiaries, some time in 1889, making him the first." Mecklem still retains the distinction of being the first female saxophonist to record and likely the first female instrumental soloist as well. "It is not known if Edison ever released any of Mecklem’s recordings for sale to the public."
