= Betty Boegehold =

American children's author

- Born: September 15, 1913; New York City
- Died: April 7, 1985 (aged 71); Bronxville, New York
- Other names: Donovan Doyle
- Occupation: Children's author
- Years active: 1965–1985
- Children: 1

Betty Virginia Doyle Boegehold (Note: In 1984, Gale's Contemporary Authors gave the surname's pronunciation as "Berg-a-hold".) (September 15, 1913 – April 7, 1985) was an American children's author, known for the Pippa Mouse series.

== Life and career ==
Born in 1913 in New York City, Boegehold was a resident of Bronxville, New York. A graduate of Wellesley College in 1935 and Columbia University in 1943, she began her teaching career in 1948 and joined New York's Bank Street Writers Workshop in 1967, where she also researched education methods. During her career, she was also a librarian and preschool teacher.

Boegehold's works—among them a fairy tale with black characters, stories of young characters in urban areas as opposed to rural and suburban, and a piece featuring a working mother—tackled traditional stereotypes found in children's material in her time. She also used animal characters to express human emotions to her readers. Later titles of hers "dealt with societal issues facing children".

One of Boegehold's early manuscripts initially told the tale of a boy mouse named Pippen, but a lecture on literary sexism convinced her to change the character's name and gender. The resulting book, Pippa Mouse, became a bestseller and led to a series.

Boegehold contributed to children's magazines under her real name, as well as Houghton Mifflin's Discovery series; she also wrote under the pseudonym of Donovan Doyle. While she reportedly died of a heart attack on April 7, 1985, her works remained in print as of 2005. One of her final books, You Can Say "NO", underwent a 1987 censorship challenge at Starke, Florida's school board over its sexual content.

== Selected works ==
=== Series ===
- Bank Street Reading Series
- Pippa Mouse

=== Standalone ===
- Three to Get Ready (1965)
- Paw Paw's Run (1969)
- What the Wind Told (1974)
- Education Before Five (1975)
- Small Deer's Magic Tricks (1977)
- Beat Underground (1980)
- Chipper's Choices (1981)
- In the Castle of Cats (1981)
- The Pleasure of Their Company: How to Have More Fun with Your Children (1981; with William Hooks)
- Getting Ready to Read (1984)
- Daddy Doesn't Live Here Anymore (1985)
- You Can Say "NO" (1985)

=== As Donovan Doyle ===
These five titles were published by Houghton Mifflin.

- Almost There
- Bugs
- Gray Gull
- The Old Woman Who Couldn't Keep a Secret
- Perseus and Andromeda: A Retelling
