= The Mini Page =

The Mini Page was a syndicated newspaper supplement for children, created by Betty Debnam Hunt in 1969 and authored by her and two other writers.

== History ==
The Mini Page began in August 1969 and appears weekly in hundreds of newspapers in the United States as an offering of Andrews McMeel Syndication. Its regular features include short articles, puzzles, jokes, and recipes. Andrews McMeel has also published several Mini Page spinoff books covering subjects such as the U.S. military, science, the states, history, geography and the environment.

The supplement was conceived as a cross between the Weekly Reader and a newspaper comics section, with an underlying mission of encouraging family-centered reading and literacy. It was the first supplement of its kind when it debuted in August 1969 in the Raleigh, North Carolina News & Observer. The Mini Page's first issue had a "Back to School" theme and included a mini-profile of Los Angeles Rams quarterback Roman Gabriel and a "Faces in the News" section asking readers to identify a picture of Spiro Agnew.

When Debnam created the Mini Page, she had been an elementary school teacher for twelve years and had never drawn before. Initially, she handled all tasks involved in the Mini Page's production, including researching, producing, laying out and editing all the content. She was also responsible for selling advertising, which is no longer included in the supplement. Debnam sold The Mini Page to Andrews McMeel in 2007 but continued to consult on the feature.

== Awards ==
In 1999, as the Mini Page celebrated its thirtieth anniversary, Debnam was inducted into the North Carolina Journalism Hall of Fame and received the first-ever Lifetime Achievement Award from the Newspaper Association of America. Debnam was inducted into the Association of Educational Publishers' hall of fame in 2001, and the Raleigh Hall of Fame in 2013. She won a 2007 Distinguished Achievement Award from the AEP for The Mini Page Guide to the Constitution, a nine-part series that was released as a book by Andrews McMeel after appearing in newspapers.

== Betty Debnam ==
Debnam credited her inspiration for the Mini Page to her family, especially her grandmother, who ran a small weekly newspaper in Snow Hill, North Carolina. Her grandfather was a school superintendent and edited the newspaper; her father was a newspaper reporter in Norfolk, Virginia. Debnam was married to Richard Hunt, a former Associated Press reporter and military adviser to Hubert Humphrey and died on November 1, 2020.
