= Steve Israel (American football) =

American football player (born 1969)

No. 21, 31
- Position: Cornerback

Personal information
- Born: March 16, 1969 (age 57); Camden, New Jersey, U.S.
- Listed height: 5 ft 11 in (1.80 m)
- Listed weight: 194 lb (88 kg)

Career information
- High school: Haddon Heights (NJ)
- College: Pittsburgh
- NFL draft: 1992: 2nd round, 30th overall pick

Career history
- Los Angeles Rams (1992–1994); Green Bay Packers (1995)*; San Francisco 49ers (1995–1996); New England Patriots (1997–1999); New Orleans Saints (2000–2001); Carolina Panthers (2002)*
- * Offseason or practice squad member only

Awards and highlights
- All-East Team (1991)

Career NFL statistics
- Tackles: 68
- Interceptions: 5
- Sacks: 4
- Stats at Pro Football Reference

Steven Douglas Israel (born March 16, 1969) is an American former professional football player who was a cornerback in the National Football League (NFL). He played college football for the Pittsburgh Panthers.

== Career ==
Israel grew up in Lawnside, New Jersey and played high school football at Haddon Heights High School.

He played college football at the University of Pittsburgh and was selected first in the second round of the 1992 NFL draft. He played in the NFL for the Los Angeles Rams, the San Francisco 49ers, the New England Patriots, the New Orleans Saints, and the Carolina Panthers. After ten years in the NFL, Israel is now a college football analyst on ESPNU, Fox Sports and has appeared on some local networks.

Israel founded the EndZone Luncheon Series and created the Gridiron Luncheon Series in Charlotte.

== Personal life ==
Israel received a BA in economics from the University of Pittsburgh and received business qualifications from the Stanford Graduate School of Business and from Harvard Business School.

In recognition for his contributions to football, Israel was inducted into the Camden County, New Jersey Hall Of Fame and the South Jersey Coaches Hall Of Fame.

Israel is currently married to Lorae Israel, lives in Charlotte, North Carolina, and has four children.

His younger brother, Ron, also played in the NFL.
