= Haddon Heights High School =

High school in Camden County, New Jersey, US

Haddon Heights Junior/Senior High School
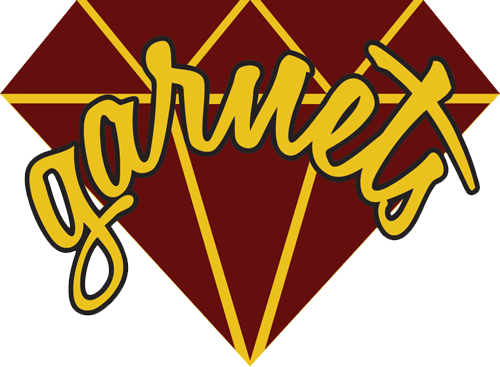

Location
- 301 Second Avenue; Haddon Heights, Camden County, New Jersey 08035; United States; 39.88403°N 75.05115°W

Information
- Type: Public middle school / high school
- Motto: "Where Tradition and Progress Meet"
- Established: c. 1898
- NCES School ID: 340633001528
- Principal: Warren Danenza
- Faculty: 81.0 FTEs
- Grades: 7 - 12
- Enrollment: 926 (as of 2024–25)
- Student to teacher ratio: 11.4:1
- Colors: Garnet gold
- Athletics conference: Colonial Conference (general); West Jersey Football League (football)
- Team name: Garnets
- Rival: Haddonfield Memorial High School
- Newspaper: The Scribe
- Yearbook: Garneeteer
- Website: highschool.gogarnets.com

Haddon Heights Junior/Senior High School, commonly known as Haddon Heights High School, is a six-year comprehensive public middle school / high school that serves students in seventh through twelfth grades from Haddon Heights, in Camden County, in New Jersey, operating as part of the Haddon Heights School District. The school also serves students from the neighboring communities of Barrington, Lawnside and Merchantville (starting in the 2015–16 school year), who attend the high school for grades 9–12 as part of sending/receiving relationships.

As of the 2024–25 school year, the school had an enrollment of 926 students and 81.0 classroom teachers (on an FTE basis), for a student–teacher ratio of 11.4:1. There were 199 students (21.5% of enrollment) eligible for free lunch and 38 (4.1% of students) eligible for reduced-cost lunch.

The school was nationally ranked #6,114 and #206 in New Jersey High Schools for an overall score of 65.84/100..

== History ==
The first graduating class in June 1903 included students from Audubon. The high school's current Tudor Gothic-style building, constructed at a cost of $500,000 (equivalent to $9.4 million in 2025) opened in September 1924.

In September 1960, students from Magnolia, Somerdale and Stratford left the high school to start attending the new Sterling High School.

In 1992, the borough of Merchantville, which at the time was sending students to Pennsauken High School in Pennsauken Township as part of a longstanding sending/receiving relationship with the Pennsauken Public Schools, made plans to switch its high school students to Haddon Heights High, but the New Jersey Commissioner of Education did not allow these plans to go forward. In 2012, the board of the Merchantville School District decided to send its students to Haddon Heights High. The Haddon Heights district approved a plan in September 2013; it would add nearly 80 students a year from Merchantville to the high school, in addition to the average of more than 260 students from Barrington and 120 from Lawnside that are sent to Haddon Heights each year. The plan was approved by the Commissioner of the New Jersey Department of Education, and students from Merchantville began attending the school in September 2015. Students from Merchantville already in high school before 2015 will continue to attend Pennsauken High until their graduation. Scott Strong, the chief administrator of the Merchantville district, stated that "Haddon Heights offers the right programs, the right diversity and really met our needs."

== Awards, recognition and rankings ==
The school was the 207th-ranked public high school in New Jersey out of 339 schools statewide in New Jersey Monthly magazine's September 2014 cover story on the state's "Top Public High Schools", using a new ranking methodology. The school had been ranked 151st in the state of 328 schools in 2012, after being ranked 129th in 2010 out of 322 schools listed. The magazine ranked the school 168th in 2008 out of 316 schools. The school was ranked 135th in the magazine's September 2006 issue, which surveyed 316 schools across the state. Schooldigger.com ranked the school 159th out of 381 public high schools statewide in its 2011 rankings (an increase of 69 positions from the 2010 ranking) which were based on the combined percentage of students classified as proficient or above proficient on the mathematics (84.0%) and language arts literacy (91.8%) components of the High School Proficiency Assessment (HSPA).

== Athletics ==
The Haddon Heights High School Garnets compete in the Colonial Conference, which is comprised of public high schools in Camden and Gloucester counties operating under the supervision of the New Jersey State Interscholastic Athletic Association (NJSIAA). With 657 students in grades 10–12, the school was classified by the NJSIAA for the 2022–24 school years as Group II South for most athletic competition purposes. The football team competes in the Constitution Division of the 94-team West Jersey Football League superconference and was classified by the NJSIAA as Group II South for football for 2024–2026, which included schools with 514 to 685 students.

The school has Boys and Girls Basketball teams, soccer, boys/girls track, field hockey, boys cross country, girls lacrosse, as well as a softball and baseball team.

== Extracurricular activities ==
=== Marching band ===
The marching band was Tournament of Bands Atlantic Coast Champions in Group 1 in 1994. They finished in third place at the 2007 United States Scholastic Band Association National Championships, competing as a Group I band at M&T Bank Stadium in Baltimore, Maryland on November 16, 2007, with a score of 94.175, missing second place by 1/20th of a point.

At the USSBA Yamaha Cup competition in October 2012, the marching band came in first in the 1 Open group, winning awards for Best Visual and Best Guard.

== Administration ==
The school's principal is Warren Danenza. His core administration team includes three assistant principals.

== Notable alumni ==
- Tommy Avallone (born c. 1983, class of 2001), film director and producer
- Mary Chalmers (born 1927, class of 1944), author and illustrator who wrote children's books frequently featuring cats
- Sarah Elfreth (born 1988, class of 2006), politician who has represented the 30th district of the Maryland Senate
- Ray Fisher (born 1988), actor in 2008 short film The Good, the Bad, and the Confused and Cyborg in Batman v Superman: Dawn of Justice
- Kristin Hunter (1931–2008), author best known for her first novel, God Bless the Child, published in 1964
- Ron Israel (born 1978), former professional football safety who played in the NFL for the Minnesota Vikings
- Steve Israel (born 1969), former football cornerback who played nine seasons in NFL
- Jeff Jones (born 1957), baseball player who played in MLB for the Cincinnati Reds
- Herb Kelleher (1931–2019), co-founder, chairman and former CEO of Southwest Airlines
- Bill Manlove (born 1933, class of 1951), National Champion football coach at Widener University, member of College Football Hall of Fame
- Walter E. Pedersen (1911–1998, class of 1929), union leader and politician who served as Mayor of Clementon and a two-year term in the New Jersey General Assembly
- Haason Reddick (born 1994), football linebacker with the Tampa Bay Buccaneers
- Bo Wood (born 1945), former American football player and high school coach, who played in the NFL for the Atlanta Falcons
