= DyAnne DiSalvo =

American artist and children's author

DyAnne DiSalvo is an American artist and children's book author. She has published more than 50 children's books, including City Green (HarperCollins, 1994) and Uncle Willie and the Soup Kitchen (HarperCollins, 1991).

== Early life and career ==
DiSalvo was born and raised in Brooklyn, New York. She attended Fontbonne Hall Academy for Girls in Brooklyn and studied art at the School of Visual Arts in New York City. Before illustrating children's books, she worked as an artist for Hallmark Cards. In 1982, she met Jane Feder, then-Senior Editor at Harper and Row (now HarperCollins). Feder later founded the Jane Feder Agency, which represents children's book illustrators, and she was the agency's first client.

She has given presentations at schools, targeting K-8 students, on the writing process and the life of a working artist. In the fall of 2010, she presented at the United Nations International School of Hanoi in Vietnam.

== Books written and illustrated by DiSalvo ==
- Going to Grandma's House (1998)
- A Dog Like Jack (2000)
- Grandpa's Corner Store (2001)
- A Castle on Viola Street (2001)
- Spaghetti Park (2002)
- The Sloppy Copy Slipup (2006)

== Books illustrated by DiSalvo ==
=== By Mary Pope Osborne ===
- Mo to the Rescue (1988)
- Mo and his Friends (Dial, 1989)

=== By Beverly Cleary ===
- Two Dog Biscuits (1986)
- The Real Hole (1986)
- The Growing-Up Feet (1987)
- Janet's Thingamajigs (1987)

=== By Jane O’Connor ===
- Kate's Skates (1996)
- Nina, Nina Ballerina (1996)
- Nina, Nina Star Ballerina (1997)
- Nina, Nina Copycat Ballerina (2000)

=== By other authors ===
- That New Baby (1980)
- The Bear Under the Bed (E. P. Dutton, 1980)
- The First Day of School (1981)
- Best Friends (1983)
- The Half Birthday Party (1984)
- Those Terrible Terwilliger Twins (Raintree Heinemann-Raintree, 1984)
- Sam Ellis's Island (1985)
- Saturday Belongs to Sara (Bradbury Press, 1988)
- What did Mommy do Before You? (Albert Whitman &Co, 1988)
- The Mommy Exchange (1988)
- Why is Baby Crying? (Albert Whitman & Co, 1989)
- The Best-Ever Good-Bye Party (1989)
- George Washington's Mother (1992)
- The Go-Between (1992)
- The Christmas Knight (1993)
- You Want Women to Vote, Lizzie Stanton? (1995)
- Olivia and The Real Live Pet (1995)
- Friends and Amigos Series (1995)
- True Blue (1996)
- The Bravest Cat, a True Story About Scarlet (1997)
- Now We Can Have a Wedding (1998)
- The American Wei (Albert Whitman & Co, 1998)
- If I Were President (Albert Whitman & Co, 1999)
- Is It Hanukkah Yet? (2000)
- Our Eight Nights of Hanukkah (2000)
- A Doll Named Dora Anne (2002)
- Grandma's Smile (A Neal Porter Book/Roaring Brook Press/Macmillan, 2010)

== Impact of books written and illustrated by DiSalvo ==
=== Uncle Willie and the Soup Kitchen (1991) ===
DiSalvo wrote and illustrated Uncle Willie and The Soup Kitchen (1991), which was inspired by her volunteer work at Chips Soup Kitchen in Brooklyn. The book received the 1991 Children's Book of the Year award from the Child Study Association of America Book Committee. It was also named Notable 1991 Children's Book by the National Council for the Social Studies and Children's Book Council United. The book was featured on the television show Reading Rainbow in 1996 and adapted into a children's play at the Puttin' on The Ritz Theatre in Oaklyn, New Jersey in 2000.

=== City Green (1994) ===
City Green (1994) tells the story of a young girl who helps transform a vacant city lot into a garden. Illustrations from the book served as inspiration for a children's playground at the Dallas Arboretum and Botanical Garden during the Storybook competition in 2009. Stagebridge Theater Company in Berkeley, California produced a musical adaptation. A 25th anniversary edition was published by HarperCollins in 2019.

== Awards and honors ==
The Sloppy Copy Slipup, (Holiday House), 2006:

- Bank Street Library Best Children's Book of the Year
- Minnesota Maud Hart Lovelace Book Award Nominee (2010–2011)
- Garden State Children's Book Award Master List (2008–2009)
- Sunshine State Young Readers Award Master List (2008–2009)
- Young Hoosier Book Award Master List (2008–2009)
- Rhode Island State Book Award Master List (2008–2009)
- Great Stone Face Book Award Master List (2006–2007)

A Castle on Viola Street, (HarperCollins, 2001):

- Notable 2001 Children's Book (National Council for the Social Studies / Children's Book Council)

Grandpa's Corner Store, (HarperCollins, 2001):

- Notable 2000 Children's Book (National Council for the Social Studies / Children's Book Council)
- Congressional Commendation (United States House of Representatives, First District, NJ)
- Adapted into a 2001 Puttin' on the Ritz Children's Theatre Production (The Ritz Theatre Co., Oaklyn, NJ)

A Dog Like Jack, (Holiday House, 2000):

- Gold Medal, Irma S. and James H. Black Award (Bank Street College of Education Bank Street Library)
- June 1999 Philadelphia Children's Reading Round Table Book of the Month
- Publishers Weekly starred review

City Green, (William Morrow and Company, 1994):

- Notable 1995 Children's Book (National Council for the Social Studies / Children's Book Council)
- Adapted into a 2010 Stagebridge Theatre Production
- Illustrations used as inspiration for a playground design at the 2009 Dallas Arboretum and Botanical Garden Storybook Playhouse competition
- Adapted into a 1999 Puttin' on the Ritz Children's Theatre Production (The Ritz Theatre Co., Oaklyn, NJ)
- 1996 Reading Rainbow Selection
- February 1996 Philadelphia Children's Reading Round Table Book of the Month
- Scholastic Corporation Spanish Edition
- Scott Foresman School Edition
- Harcourt (publisher) HBJ School Edition
- Macmillan Publishers (United States) McGraw-Hill School Edition
- Silver Burdett Ginn School Edition

Uncle Willie and the Soup Kitchen, (William Morrow and Company, 1991):

- Adapted into a 2000 Puttin' on the Ritz Children's Theatre Production (The Ritz Theatre Co., Oaklyn, NJ)
- 1996 Reading Rainbow Selection
- Notable 1991 Children's Book (National Council for the Social Studies / Children's Book Council)
- 1991 Children's Books of the Year (The Child Study Book Committee)

The American Wei, (Albert Whitman & Co., 1998):

- 1998 National Parenting Publications Awards

Now We Can Have A Wedding, (Holiday House, 1998):

- June 1998 Philadelphia Children's Reading Round Table Book of the Month

You Want Women to Vote, Lizzie Stanton?, (Putnam Publishing Group, 1995):

- ALA Selection

Olivia and the Real Live Pet, (Macmillan Publishers (United States) for Young Readers, 1995):

- October 1995 Philadelphia Children's Reading Round Table Book of the Month

The Christmas Knight, (Margaret K. McElderry, 1993):

- December 1993 Philadelphia Children's Reading Round Table Book of the Month

George Washington's Mother, (Putnam Publishing Group, 1992):

- February 1993 Philadelphia Children's Reading Round Table Book of the Month

== Personal life ==
From 1999 to 2012, DiSalvo played rhythm guitar and sang harmonies for the power-pop rock and roll band Smash Palace. Signed by Zip Records in 1999, the band toured the US and the UK and was listed among BBC Liverpool's Best Top Ten Live Acts in 2006.

DiSalvo lives in Princeton, New Jersey, and is the mother of two adult children: educator and entrepreneur John E. Zangari-Ryan and screenwriter Marja-Lewis Ryan.
