= Haddon Heights, New Jersey =

Borough in Camden County, New Jersey, US

- Borough
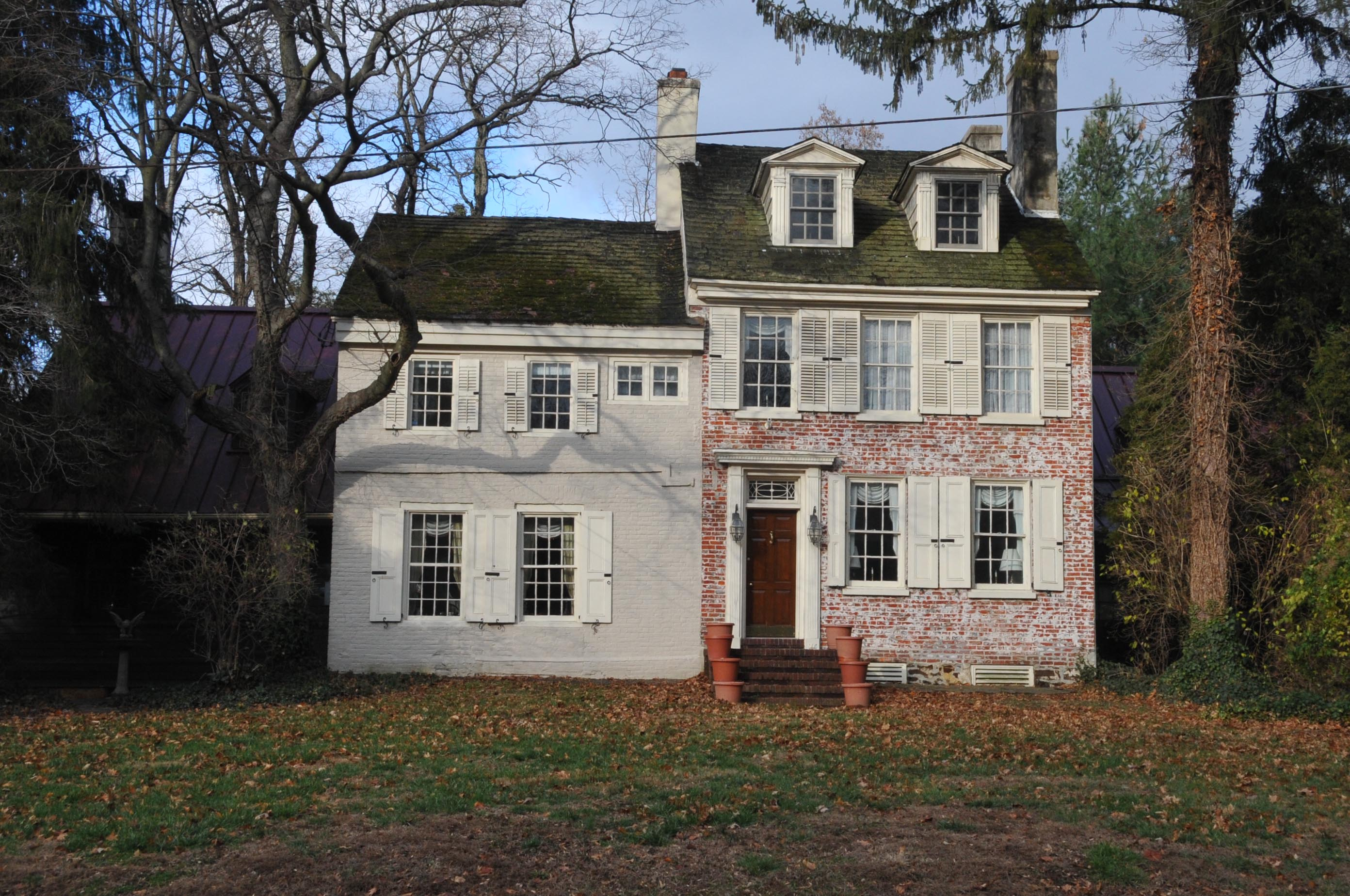
- Hinchman-Lippincott House

- Haddon Heights highlighted in Camden County. Inset: Location of Camden County in the State of New Jersey.

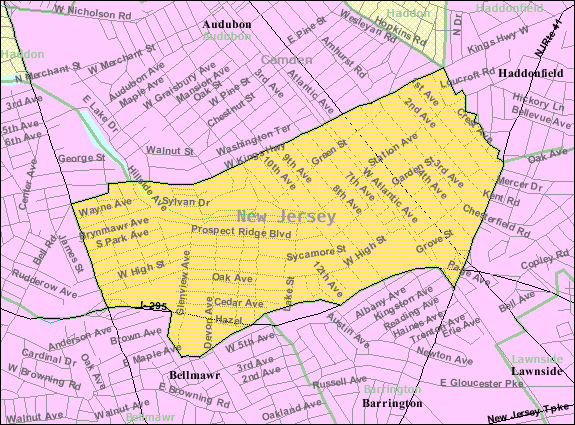
- Census Bureau map of Haddon Heights, New Jersey

- Location in Camden County Location in New Jersey Location in the United States
- Coordinates: 39.879127°N 75.065918°W
- Country: United States
- State: New Jersey
- County: Camden
- European settlement: 1699
- Incorporated: March 2, 1904
- Named for: Elizabeth Haddon

Government
  - Type: Borough
  - Body: Borough Council
  - Mayor: Zachary Houck (D, term ends December 31, 2027)
  - Administrator: Vacant
  - Municipal clerk: Kelly Santosusso

Area
  - Total: 1.57 sq mi (4.07 km^{2})
  - Land: 1.57 sq mi (4.06 km^{2})
  - Water: 0.0039 sq mi (0.01 km^{2}) 0.32%
  - Rank: 445th of 565 in state 22nd of 37 in county
- Elevation: 59 ft (18 m)

Population (2020)
  - Total: 7,495
  - Estimate (2023): 7,511
  - Rank: 306th of 565 in state 17th of 37 in county
  - Density: 4,786.1/sq mi (1,847.9/km^{2})
  - Rank: 118th of 565 in state 12th of 37 in county
- Time zone: UTC−05:00 (Eastern (EST))
  - Summer (DST): UTC−04:00 (Eastern (EDT))
- ZIP Code: 08035
- Area code: 856
- FIPS code: 3400728800
- GNIS feature ID: 0885239
- Website: www.haddonhts.com

Haddon Heights is a borough in Camden County, in the U.S. state of New Jersey. As of the 2020 United States census, the borough's population was 7,495, an increase of 22 (+0.3%) from the 2010 census count of 7,473, which in turn reflected a decline of 74 (−1.0%) from the 7,547 counted in the 2000 census.

Haddon Heights was incorporated as a borough by an act of the New Jersey Legislature on March 2, 1904, from portions of the now-defunct Centre Township and parts of Haddon Township. The borough was named for Elizabeth Haddon, an early settler of the area. Haddon Heights is a dry town where alcohol cannot be sold. A November 2024 non-binding referendum asking voters to allow liquor sales at restaurants and bars in the borough passed by a 2–1 margin; the borough council would have to approve an ordinance allowing for the sale of liquor licenses.

New Jersey Monthly magazine ranked Haddon Heights as the 98th best place to live in New Jersey in its 2008 rankings of the "Best Places To Live" in New Jersey, and the borough has also been listed among its "Classic Towns of Greater Philadelphia" by the Delaware Valley Regional Planning Commission. In 2011, New Jersey Monthly named Haddon Heights the second best town to live in Southern New Jersey, after Moorestown Township.

== History ==
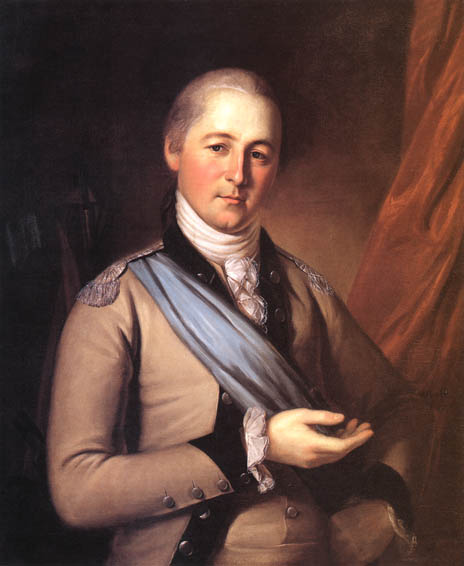
Joseph Bloomfield

The land that was to become Haddon Heights was settled in 1699 by John Hinchman. In 1713, John Siddon built a farmhouse near Hinchman's property. John Thorn Glover dammed King's Run and constructed a mill race and fulling mill on this property before 1776. Jacob Hinchman built a frame dwelling no later than 1720 that was later enlarged by American Revolutionary War hero Col. Joseph Ellis. It is currently referred to as the Col. Joseph Ellis House. New Jersey governor Joseph Bloomfield later purchased this property.

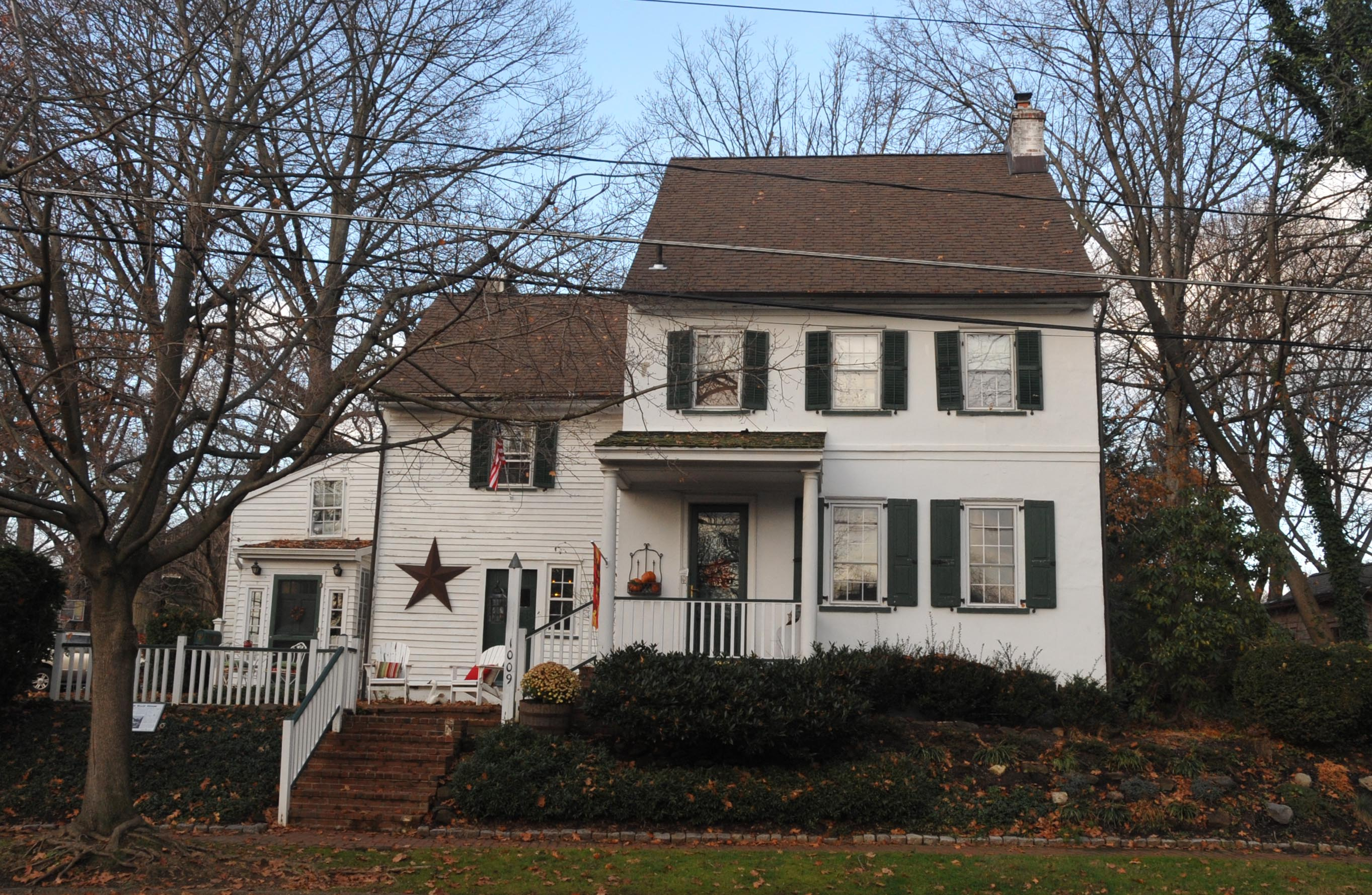
Col. Joseph Ellis House

In 1890, Benjamin A. Lippincott constructed a passenger station in the center of his land for the Atlantic City Railroad. Then Lippincott, with Charles Hillman, filed a grid street plan with Camden County to develop a community. They named it Haddon Heights because of its proximity to Haddonfield and its high elevation. Large houses were built in Colonial Revival, Queen Anne or Foursquare style that appealed to prosperous middle-class families moving from the cities. In 1904, Haddon Heights was incorporated as a borough and Lippincott was elected mayor. A small downtown grew near the railroad and the White Horse Pike and eight churches and a synagogue were built. An area of old Centre Township, known as Fairfield Estates, voted in 1926 to become part of Haddon Heights. This land was developed for more single-family housing through the 1940s and 1950s. Even though rail passenger service was suspended in July 1965, Haddon Heights remains a typical turn-of-the-twentieth-century railroad suburb with tree-shaded streets and comfortable homes.

== Geography ==
According to the United States Census Bureau, the borough had a total area of 1.57 square miles (4.07 km^{2}), including 1.57 square miles (4.06 km^{2}) of land and 0.01 square miles (0.01 km^{2}) of water (0.32%).

The borough borders Audubon, Barrington, Bellmawr, Haddonfield, Haddon Township and Mount Ephraim.

== Demographics ==
Historical population
Census	Pop.	Note	%±
1910	1,452		—
1920	2,950		103.2%
1930	5,394		82.8%
1940	5,555		3.0%
1950	7,287		31.2%
1960	9,260		27.1%
1970	9,365		1.1%
1980	8,361		−10.7%
1990	7,860		−6.0%
2000	7,547		−4.0%
2010	7,473		−1.0%
2020	7,495		0.3%
2023 (est.)	7,511	▲	0.2%
Population sources: 1910–2000 1910–1920; 1910 1910–1930; 1940–2000 2000; 2010 2020

=== 2020 census ===
As of the 2020 census, Haddon Heights had a population of 7,495. The median age was 43.0 years. 21.4% of residents were under the age of 18 and 20.5% of residents were 65 years of age or older. For every 100 females there were 91.7 males, and for every 100 females age 18 and over there were 89.4 males age 18 and over.

100.0% of residents lived in urban areas, while 0.0% lived in rural areas.

There were 3,009 households in Haddon Heights, of which 29.8% had children under the age of 18 living in them. Of all households, 55.1% were married-couple households, 13.5% were households with a male householder and no spouse or partner present, and 26.7% were households with a female householder and no spouse or partner present. About 27.5% of all households were made up of individuals and 15.3% had someone living alone who was 65 years of age or older.

There were 3,154 housing units, of which 4.6% were vacant. The homeowner vacancy rate was 2.0% and the rental vacancy rate was 5.3%.

Racial composition as of the 2020 census
Race	Number	Percent
White	6,857	91.5%
Black or African American	87	1.2%
American Indian and Alaska Native	10	0.1%
Asian	87	1.2%
Native Hawaiian and Other Pacific Islander	1	0.0%
Some other race	90	1.2%
Two or more races	363	4.8%
Hispanic or Latino (of any race)	254	3.4%

=== 2010 census ===
The 2010 United States census counted 7,473 people, 2,997 households, and 2,023 families in the borough. The population density was 4,764.1 per square mile (1,839.4/km^{2}). There were 3,159 housing units at an average density of 2,013.9 per square mile (777.6/km^{2}). The racial makeup was 95.45% (7,133) White, 1.12% (84) Black or African American, 0.16% (12) Native American, 1.31% (98) Asian, 0.07% (5) Pacific Islander, 0.54% (40) from other races, and 1.35% (101) from two or more races. Hispanic or Latino of any race were 2.65% (198) of the population.

Of the 2,997 households, 29.4% had children under the age of 18; 55.6% were married couples living together; 8.8% had a female householder with no husband present and 32.5% were non-families. Of all households, 28.4% were made up of individuals and 13.0% had someone living alone who was 65 years of age or older. The average household size was 2.49 and the average family size was 3.10.

22.9% of the population were under the age of 18, 6.5% from 18 to 24, 23.9% from 25 to 44, 30.7% from 45 to 64, and 16.0% who were 65 years of age or older. The median age was 42.6 years. For every 100 females, the population had 91.5 males. For every 100 females ages 18 and older there were 87.9 males.

The Census Bureau's 2006–2010 American Community Survey showed that (in 2010 inflation-adjusted dollars) median household income was $82,663 (with a margin of error of +/− $9,335) and the median family income was $101,943 (+/− $5,362). Males had a median income of $75,785 (+/− $5,098) versus $58,912 (+/− $4,731) for females. The per capita income for the borough was $40,913 (+/− $3,618). No families and 1.0% of the population were below the poverty line, including none of those under age 18 and 3.3% of those age 65 or over.

=== 2000 census ===
As of the 2000 United States census there were 7,547 people, 3,039 households, and 2,039 families residing in the borough. The population density was 4,855.5 inhabitants per square mile (1,874.7/km^{2}). There were 3,136 housing units at an average density of 2,017.6 per square mile (779.0/km^{2}). The racial makeup of the borough was 97.97% White, 0.40% African American, 0.11% Native American, 0.65% Asian, 0.04% Pacific Islander, 0.27% from other races, and 0.57% from two or more races. Hispanic or Latino of any race were 1.05% of the population.

There were 3,039 households, out of which 30.6% had children under the age of 18 living with them, 56.4% were married couples living together, 8.2% had a female householder with no husband present, and 32.9% were non-families. 28.5% of all households were made up of individuals, and 14.7% had someone living alone who was 65 years of age or older. The average household size was 2.48 and the average family size was 3.09.

In the borough the population was spread out, with 24.1% under the age of 18, 5.3% from 18 to 24, 28.2% from 25 to 44, 24.2% from 45 to 64, and 18.2% who were 65 years of age or older. The median age was 41 years. For every 100 females, there were 89.0 males. For every 100 females age 18 and over, there were 86.3 males.

The median income for a household in the borough was $58,424, and the median income for a family was $73,460. Males had a median income of $51,572 versus $35,208 for females. The per capita income for the borough was $28,198. About 1.0% of families and 2.8% of the population were below the poverty line, including 1.9% of those under age 18 and 5.3% of those age 65 or over.

== Arts and culture ==
The Haddon Heights Public Library provides residents access to more than 46,000 volumes in the fiction, mystery, teen, children's, non-fiction and biography collections as well as periodicals, DVDs, Audio CDs, reference materials, online databases, e-content, and museum passes. Dating back to 1902, there was a Haddon Heights Library Association. The current library building was constructed in 1965.

== Government ==
=== Local government ===
Haddon Heights is governed under the borough form of New Jersey municipal government, which is used in 218 municipalities (of the 564) statewide, making it the most common form of government in New Jersey. The governing body is comprised of a mayor and a borough council, with all positions elected at-large on a partisan basis as part of the November general election. A mayor is elected directly by the voters to a four-year term of office. The borough council has six members elected to serve three-year terms on a staggered basis, with two seats coming up for election each year in a three-year cycle. The borough form of government used by Haddon Heights is a "weak mayor / strong council" government in which council members act as the legislative body, with the mayor presiding at meetings and voting only in the event of a tie. The mayor can veto ordinances subject to an override by a two-thirds majority vote of the council. The mayor makes committee and liaison assignments for council members, and most appointments are made by the mayor with the advice and consent of the council.

The reorganization meeting of the governing body is held on the first Saturday in January. At this meeting, the newly elected council members take the oath of office and a council president, who serves as acting mayor when the mayor is absent, is elected by the council. Appointments for the coming year are announced by the mayor and confirmed by the council when required by law.

As of 2023, the mayor of Haddon Heights is Democrat Zachary Houck, whose term of office ends December 31, 2023. Members of the Borough Council are Council President Christopher Morgan (D, 2024), Trisha D. Egbert (D, 2023), Tom Ottoson (D, 2025), Matthew Pagan (D, 2025), Regina M. Philipps (D, 2023) and Kate Russo (D, 2024).

At the January 2022 reorganization meeting Scott Schreiber was appointed to fill the seat expiring in December 2022 that had been vacated by Asiyah Kurtz.

In March 2016, the borough council selected Vincent Ceroli from three candidates nominated by the Republican municipal committee to fill the seat expiring in December 2016 that had been held by Earl R. Miller Jr. until he resigned from office.

=== Federal, state and county representation ===
Haddon Heights is located in the 1st Congressional District and is part of New Jersey's 5th state legislative district.

For the 119th United States Congress, New Jersey's 1st congressional district is represented by Donald Norcross (D, Camden). New Jersey is represented in the United States Senate by Democrats Cory Booker (Newark, term ends 2027) and Andy Kim (Moorestown, term ends 2031).

For the 2026–2027 session, the 5th legislative district of the New Jersey Legislature is represented in the State Senate by Nilsa Cruz-Perez (D, Barrington) and in the General Assembly by Bill Moen (D, Camden) and William Spearman (D, Camden).

Camden County is governed by a Board of County Commissioners composed of seven members chosen at-large in partisan elections for three-year terms on a staggered basis by the residents of the county, with either two or three seats up for election each year as part of the November general election. At a reorganization meeting held in January after each election, the newly constituted Board of Commissioners selects one member to serve as Director and another as Deputy Director, each serving a one-year term in that role. As of 2025, Camden County's Commissioners are: Commissioner Director Louis Cappelli Jr. (D, Collingswood, 2026), Commissioner Deputy Director Edward T. McDonnell (D, Pennsauken Township, 2025), Virginia Ruiz Betteridge (D, Runnemede, 2025), Almar Dyer (D, Pennsauken Township, 2027), Melinda Kane (D, Cherry Hill, 2027), Jeffrey L. Nash (D, Winslow Township, 2027), and Jonathan L. Young Sr. (D, Berlin Township, 2026).

Camden County's constitutional officers are: Clerk Pamela Rosen Lampitt (D, Cherry Hill, 2029) Sheriff Chuck Billingham (D, Gloucester City, 2027) and Surrogate Michelle Gentek-Mayer (D, Gloucester Township, 2025).

=== Politics ===
As of March 2011, there were a total of 5,754 registered voters in Haddon Heights, of which 2,137 (37.1%) were registered as Democrats, 1,310 (22.8%) were registered as Republicans and 2,300 (40.0%) were registered as Unaffiliated. There were 7 voters registered as Libertarians or Greens.

Gubernatorial election results for Haddon Heights
Year	Republican		Democratic		Third party(ies)	
Year	No.	%	No.	%	No.	%
2025	1,358	32.52%	2,797	66.98%	21	0.50%
2021	1,326	39.24%	2,019	59.75%	34	1.01%
2017	1,109	37.15%	1,794	60.10%	82	2.75%
2013	1,821	65.22%	928	33.24%	43	1.54%
2009	1,450	47.40%	1,338	43.74%	271	8.86%
2005	1,306	46.16%	1,385	48.96%	138	4.88%

In the 2012 presidential election, Democrat Barack Obama received 54.8% of the vote (2,352 cast), ahead of Republican Mitt Romney with 44.0% (1,891 votes), and other candidates with 1.2% (51 votes), among the 4,326 ballots cast by the borough's 6,019 registered voters (32 ballots were spoiled), for a turnout of 71.9%. In the 2008 presidential election, Democrat Barack Obama received 55.8% of the vote (2,548 cast), ahead of Republican John McCain, who received around 41.4% (1,893 votes), with 4,568 ballots cast among the borough's 5,586 registered voters, for a turnout of 81.8%. In the 2004 presidential election, Democrat John Kerry received 53.2% of the vote (2,411 ballots cast), outpolling Republican George W. Bush, who received around 45.1% (2,045 votes), with 4,534 ballots cast among the borough's 5,562 registered voters, for a turnout percentage of 81.5.

United States presidential election results for Haddon Heights
Year	Republican		Democratic		Third party(ies)	
Year	No.	%	No.	%	No.	%
2024	1,697	34.72%	3,091	63.25%	99	2.03%
2020	1,788	34.71%	3,281	63.70%	82	1.59%
2016	1,610	36.59%	2,563	58.25%	227	5.16%
2012	1,891	44.04%	2,352	54.77%	51	1.19%
2008	1,893	41.44%	2,548	55.78%	127	2.78%
2004	2,045	45.10%	2,411	53.18%	78	1.72%

In the 2013 gubernatorial election, Republican Chris Christie received 65.2% of the vote (1,821 cast), ahead of Democrat Barbara Buono with 33.2% (928 votes), and other candidates with 1.5% (43 votes), among the 2,859 ballots cast by the borough's 6,010 registered voters (67 ballots were spoiled), for a turnout of 47.6%. In the 2009 gubernatorial election, Republican Chris Christie received 47.4% of the vote (1,450 ballots cast), ahead of both Democrat Jon Corzine with 43.7% (1,338 votes) and Independent Chris Daggett with 6.4% (195 votes), with 3,059 ballots cast among the borough's 5,680 registered voters, yielding a 53.9% turnout.

United States Senate election results for Haddon Heights1
Year	Republican		Democratic		Third party(ies)	
Year	No.	%	No.	%	No.	%
2024	1,653	34.25%	3,135	64.96%	38	0.79%
2018	1,597	40.44%	2,125	53.81%	227	5.75%
2012	1,805	43.61%	2,272	54.89%	62	1.50%
2006	1,438	47.87%	1,502	50.00%	64	2.13%

United States Senate election results for Haddon Heights2
Year	Republican		Democratic		Third party(ies)	
Year	No.	%	No.	%	No.	%
2020	1,931	37.58%	3,164	61.57%	44	0.86%
2014	1,243	46.00%	1,422	52.63%	37	1.37%
2013	760	47.35%	830	51.71%	15	0.93%
2008	2,029	47.34%	2,208	51.52%	49	1.14%

== Education ==
The Haddon Heights School District serves public school students in kindergarten through twelfth grade. As of the 2024–25 school year, the district, comprised of four schools, had an enrollment of 1,556 students and 135.5 classroom teachers (on an FTE basis), for a student–teacher ratio of 11.5:1. Schools in the district (with 2024–25 enrollment data from the National Center for Education Statistics) are Atlantic Avenue Elementary School with 125 students in grades PreK–2, Glenview Elementary School with 261 students in grades K–6, Seventh Avenue Elementary School with 145 students in grades 3–6 and Haddon Heights Junior/Senior High School with 926 students in grades 7–12. The districts' high school also serves students from the neighboring communities of Barrington and Lawnside who attend the high school for grades 9–12 as part of sending/receiving relationships with the three respective school districts.

St. Rose of Lima School, founded in 1921, is a K–8 elementary school that operates under the auspices of the Roman Catholic Diocese of Camden.

Baptist Regional School is a private, co-educational K–12 college-preparatory school governed by a board of directors in association with Haddon Heights Baptist Church (GARBC). The school offers an integrated curriculum with a conservative Christian worldview.

== Transportation ==
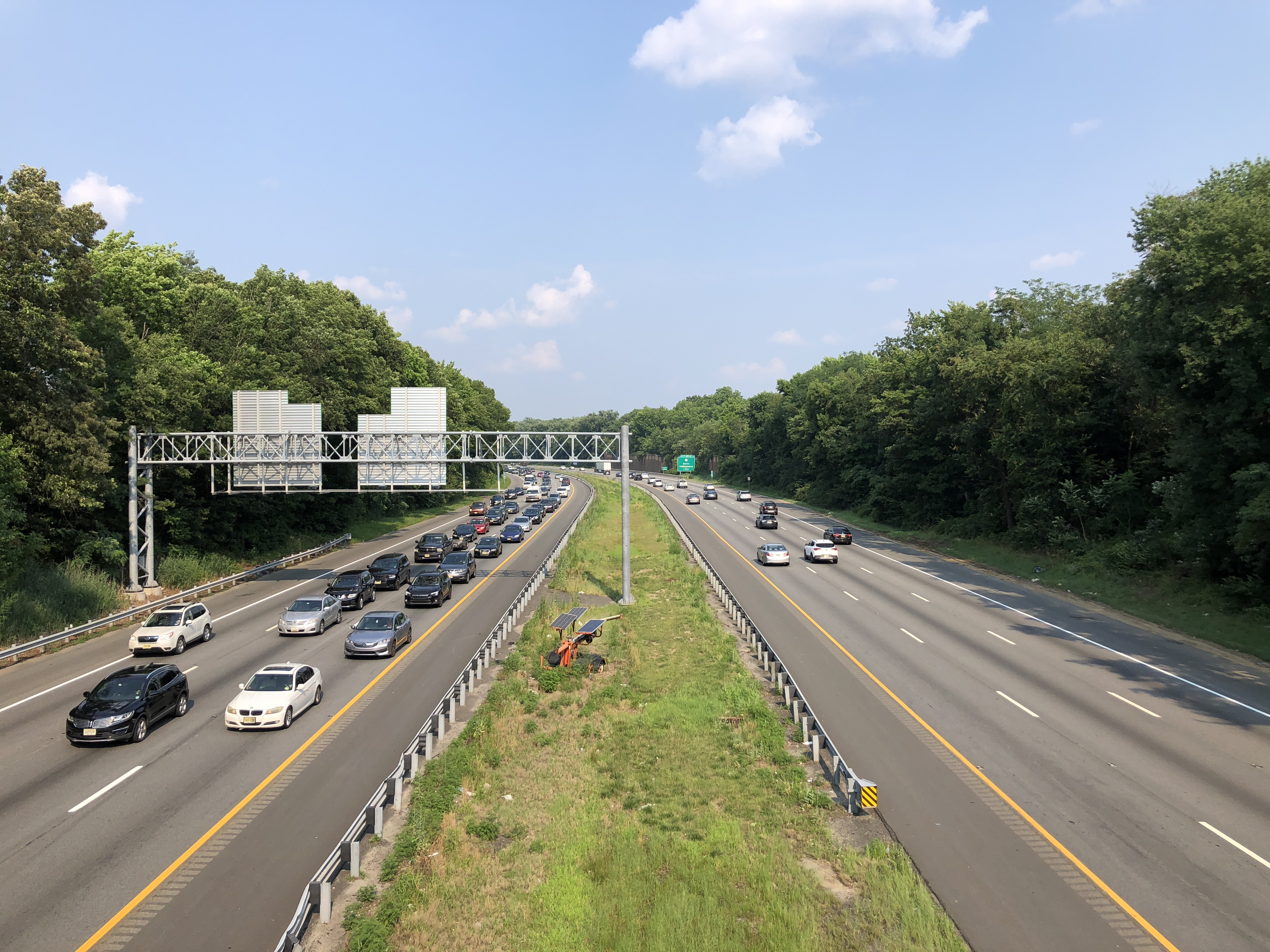
Interstate 295 northbound in Haddon Heights

=== Roads and highways ===
As of May 2010, the borough had a total of 30.82 miles (49.60 km) of roadways, of which 22.06 miles (35.50 km) were maintained by the municipality, 6.52 miles (10.49 km) by Camden County and 2.24 miles (3.60 km) by the New Jersey Department of Transportation.

Interstate 295 follows the southern border of the borough, while Route 168 (Black Horse Pike) straddles the western border and Route 41 follows the eastern border.

=== Public transportation ===
NJ Transit local bus service between the borough and Philadelphia is provided on the 400 and 403 routes, with local service available on the 455 and 457 routes.

Commuter train service to Philadelphia is available using the PATCO Speedline. The closest stops are Westmont and Haddonfield.

== Notable people ==
People who were born in, residents of, or otherwise closely associated with Haddon Heights include:

- Rob Andrews (born 1957), Congressman
- Tommy Avallone (born c. 1983), film director and producer
- Andrew Bailey (born 1984), Major League Baseball player, two time MLB All-Star, and 2009 AL Rookie of the Year for the Oakland Athletics
- Edward Clyde Benfold (1931–1952), United States Navy Hospital Corpsman Third Class who was killed in action and posthumously awarded the Medal of Honor
- Erwin Bergdoll (1890–1965), racing driver during the formative years of auto racing, who had been imprisoned for dodging the draft during World War I
- Matt Brady (born 1965), Division I college basketball head coach at James Madison University
- Mary Chalmers (born 1927), author and illustrator who wrote children's books frequently featuring cats
- DyAnne DiSalvo, illustrator
- Bessie Mecklem Hackenberger (1876–1942), one of the earliest American-born saxophone soloists and an active participant and trustee in the Haddon Heights Woman's Club
- Patrick T. Harker (born 1958), President of the Federal Reserve Bank of Philadelphia and former president of the University of Delaware
- Steve Israel (born 1969), former NFL cornerback who played for the Los Angeles Rams, San Francisco 49ers, New England Patriots, New Orleans Saints and the Carolina Panthers
- Fredric Jameson (1934–2024), Marxist thinker and literary critic
- Jeff Jones (born 1957), baseball player who played in MLB for the Cincinnati Reds
- Herb Kelleher (1931–2019), founder/Chairman and former CEO of Southwest Airlines
- Billy Lange (born 1972), head men's basketball coach at the United States Naval Academy started his coaching career at Bishop Eustace Preparatory School in 1995–1996
- Willie Mosconi (1913–1993), billiards world champion
- Blaine Neal (born 1978), Major League Baseball player and Olympic bronze medalist 2008
- Kevin F. O'Toole (born 1950), casino gaming regulator
- George A. Palmer (1895–1981), Protestant clergyman who was pastor at Haddon Heights Baptist Church and started the long-running Morning Cheer radio broadcast in 1932 from his home in Haddon Heights
- Haason Reddick (born 1994), American football linebacker who has played in the NFL for the Arizona Cardinals
- Lee Solomon (born 1954), Associate Justice of the Supreme Court of New Jersey
- Steven Spielberg (born 1946), film director and producer
- Eric Stokes (1930–1999), composer at the University of Minnesota
