= Clarks Landing, New Jersey =

Clarks Landing, New Jersey may refer to:

- Clarks Landing, Atlantic County, New Jersey
- Clarks Landing, Ocean County, New Jersey
