= Egg Harbor Commercial Bank =

- U.S. National Register of Historic Places
- New Jersey Register of Historic Places
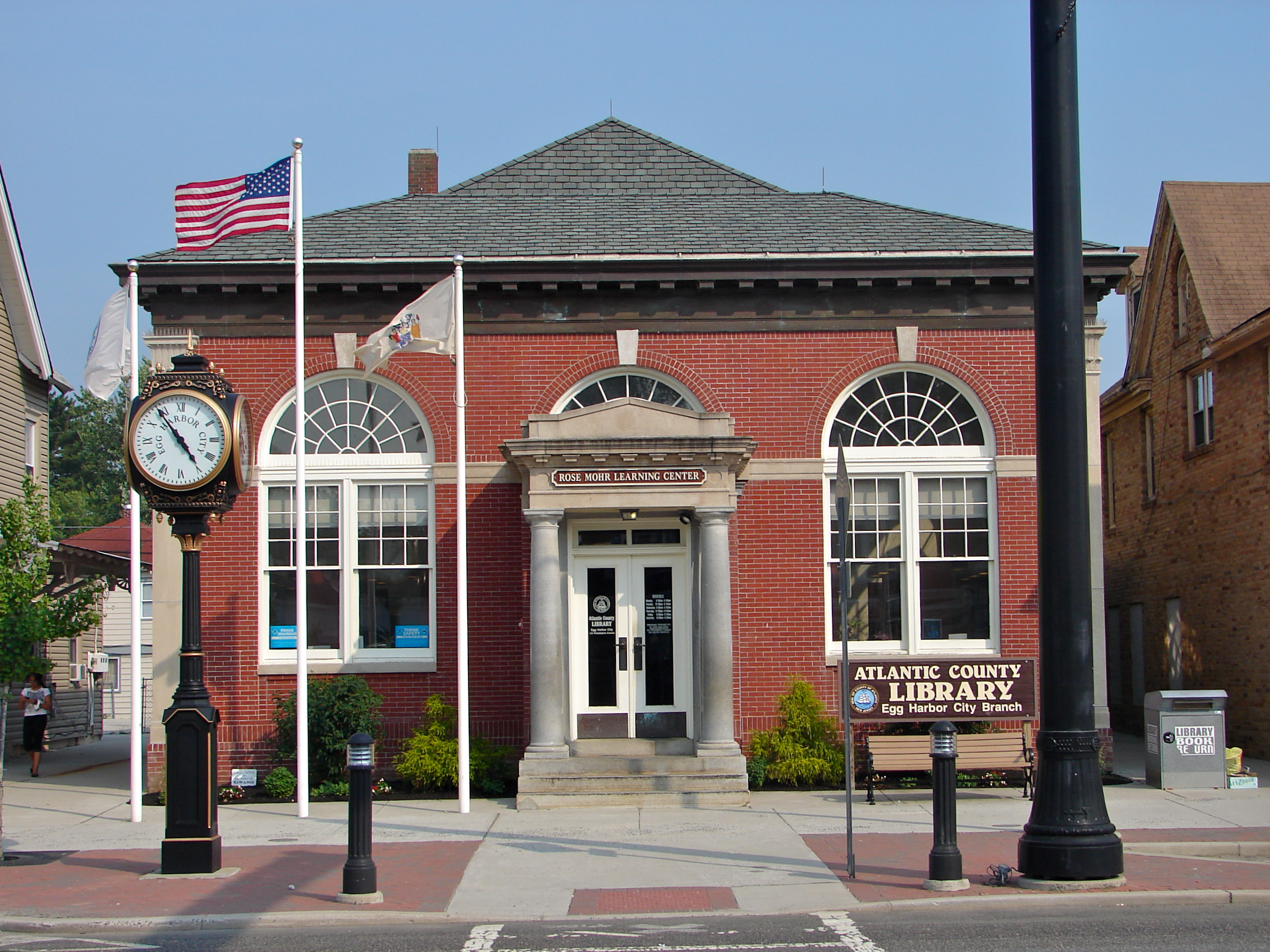

- Location within Atlantic County, New Jersey Location within New Jersey Location within the United States
- Location: 134 Philadelphia Avenue; Egg Harbor City, New Jersey
- Coordinates: 39°31′46″N 74°38′48″W
- Built: 1896
- Architectural style: Classical Revival
- NRHP reference No.: 07000875
- NJRHP No.: 4274

Significant dates
- Added to NRHP: August 28, 2007
- Designated NJRHP: June 25, 2007

The Egg Harbor Commercial Bank building is located at 134 Philadelphia Avenue in Egg Harbor City in Atlantic County, New Jersey, United States. Built in 1896, the historic brick building was added to the National Register of Historic Places on August 28, 2007, for its significance in economics. The building now is a branch of the Atlantic County Library.

== History and description ==
The Egg Harbor Commercial Bank was founded in 1888 by German-American members of the board of the Camden and Atlantic Railroad. The bank building was constructed in two stages. In the first, a two-story brick building was built in 1896. A granite portico and vestibule were added to the front between 1908 and 1917. The second stage, completed by 1924, moved the original two-story section back and built a new one-story brick section between the portico and the old section. The new section featured Classical Revival architecture. It later served as the city hall of Egg Harbor City from 1954 to 1978.

== See also ==
- National Register of Historic Places listings in Atlantic County, New Jersey
