= Roscoe Hansen =

American football player (born 1929)

No. 73
- Position: Tackle

Personal information
- Born: September 24, 1929; New York City, New York, U.S.
- Died: July 26, 2020 (aged 90); Absecon, New Jersey, U.S.
- Listed height: 6 ft 3 in (1.91 m)
- Listed weight: 215 lb (98 kg)

Career information
- High school: Holy Spirit (Absecon)
- College: North Carolina (1947–1950)
- NFL draft: 1951: 29th round, 346th overall pick

Career history
- Philadelphia Eagles (1951)

Career NFL statistics
- Games played: 9
- Stats at Pro Football Reference

Roscoe Harold Hansen Jr. (September 24, 1929 – July 26, 2020) was an American professional football tackle who played for the Philadelphia Eagles. He played college football at the University of North Carolina at Chapel Hill, having played prep football at Holy Spirit High School in New Jersey.
