= Terry Bradway =

American football executive (born 1955)

Carolina Panthers
- Title: Consultant

Personal information
- Born: May 19, 1955 (age 71)

Career information
- High school: Holy Spirit High School (Absecon, New Jersey)
- College: Trenton State College; Glassboro State College

Career history

Coaching
- Holy Spirit High School (1976–1977) Assistant coach; Cincinnati (1978) Graduate assistant/Wide receivers coach; United States Merchant Marine Academy (1979) Running backs coach

Operations
- Philadelphia Stars (1982) Scout; Philadelphia Stars (1983–1984) Administrative assistant; Baltimore Stars (1985) Assistant director of player personnel; New York Giants (1985–1991) Scout; Kansas City Chiefs (1992) National scout; Kansas City Chiefs (1993–1996) Director of college scouting; Kansas City Chiefs (1997–1999) Director for player personnel; Kansas City Chiefs (2000) Vice president for player personnel; New York Jets (2001–2005) General manager; New York Jets (2006–2014) Senior personnel executive; Miami Dolphins (2015–2020) Senior scout; Carolina Panthers (2022–present) Part-time consultant
- Executive profile at Pro Football Reference

Robert Terrence "Terry" Bradway (born May 19, 1955) is an American football executive. He was the general manager for the New York Jets of the National Football League (NFL) from 2001 to 2006. Bradway had worked in the personnel department for the Kansas City Chiefs prior to being hired as general manager of the Jets.

== Early life and career ==
A native of Atlantic City, New Jersey, Bradway played prep football at Holy Spirit High School. He played football at Trenton State College (since renamed as The College of New Jersey) and returned to Holy Spirit as a junior varsity coach after graduating. After two seasons at Holy Spirit, Bradway joined the coaching staff for the Cincinnati Bearcats, where two of his former Holy Spirit players were playing. In 1979 he became the running backs coach for the Merchant Marine Mariners at the United States Merchant Marine Academy. After one season at the academy, Bradway left coaching to pursue a master's degree in health and physical education at Glassboro State College (since renamed as Rowan University).

== Executive career ==
In 1982, Bradway was a part-time scout for the Philadelphia Stars. The following year he became an administrative assistant to Stars' president and general manager Carl Peterson. In 1985, he joined the New York Giants as a part-time scout. He was hired as a full-time scout in 1987.

In 1992, Bradway joined the Kansas City Chiefs as a national scout. The following year he was promoted to director of college scouting. In 1997, he was promoted to director of player personnel.

On January 9, 2001, Bill Parcells resigned as the New York Jets' director of football operations and recommended three of his former Giants' scouts (Bradway, Jerry Angelo, and Rick Donohue) as his successor. Two days later, the Jets hired Bradway as their general manager following a single interview. As the Jets GM, the Jets compiled a 39–41 record and made the playoffs three times. Bradway resigned in February 2006 and was succeeded by his assistant general manager, Mike Tannenbaum.

Bradway remained with the Jets as a senior personnel executive until the end of the 2014 season. He then scouted for the Miami Dolphins until 2020. In 2022, he became a part-time consultant to the Carolina Panthers.
