= Greg Roman =

American football coach (born 1972)

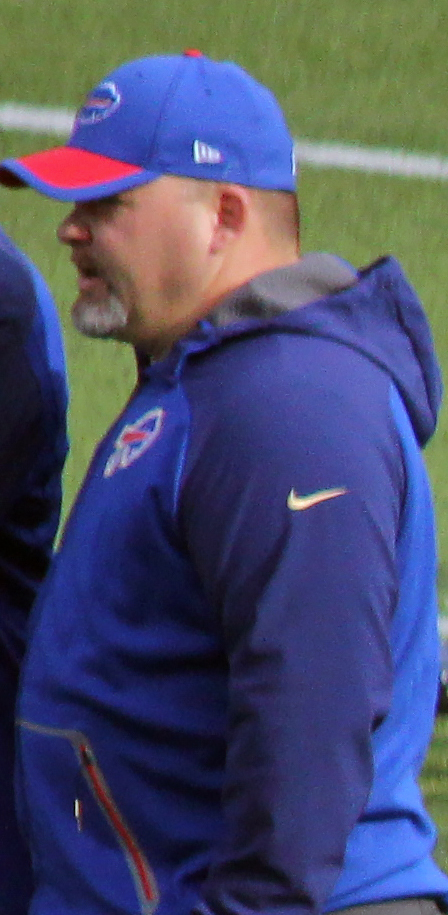
- Roman with the Buffalo Bills in 2015

New York Giants
- Title: Senior offensive assistant

Personal information
- Born: August 19, 1972 (age 54); Atlantic City, New Jersey, U.S.

Career information
- Position: Defensive lineman
- High school: Holy Spirit (Absecon, New Jersey)
- College: John Carroll

Career history
- Carolina Panthers (1995–2001) Assistant offensive line coach; Houston Texans (2002–2005); Tight ends coach (2002–2003); Quarterbacks coach (2004–2005); Baltimore Ravens (2006–2007) Assistant offensive line coach; Holy Spirit (2008) Offensive coordinator; Stanford (2009–2010) Associate head coach; San Francisco 49ers (2011–2014) Offensive coordinator; Buffalo Bills (2015–2016) Offensive coordinator; Baltimore Ravens (2017–2022); Senior offensive assistant & tight ends coach (2017); Assistant head coach & tight ends coach (2018); Offensive coordinator (2019–2022); Los Angeles Chargers (2024–2025) Offensive coordinator; New York Giants (2026–present) Senior offensive assistant

Awards and highlights
- AP NFL Assistant Coach of the Year (2019)
- Coaching profile at Pro Football Reference

Gregory P. Roman (born August 19, 1972) is an American professional football coach. He is currently Senior offensive assistant for the New York Giants of the National Football League (NFL) He was previously the Offensive Coordinator for the Los Angeles Chargers from 2024 to 2025, and the Baltimore Ravens for four years prior. Before serving with the Baltimore Ravens, Roman was an assistant coach for the Buffalo Bills, San Francisco 49ers, Houston Texans and Carolina Panthers.

== Early life and playing career ==
Roman was born in Atlantic City, New Jersey and grew up in nearby Ventnor. He and his two older brothers, Jeff and Jim, were raised by his mom after his parents divorced. Roman never had a relationship with his father. At age 10, with his family strapped for cash, Roman got his first job as a paperboy for the Atlantic City newspaper The Press; during the summers he worked as a "runner" on the beaches of South Jersey. The money he made, in addition to helping to support his family, helped him to pay for his education at a nearby private high school. He graduated from Holy Spirit High School in Absecon, New Jersey where he played football for the Holy Spirit Spartans. In his senior year at Holy Spirit, he was named to the All-South Jersey team. After graduation in 1991, Roman got an academic scholarship to attend John Carroll University in the Cleveland suburb of University Heights.

Roman played football for the John Carroll Blue Streaks for three years, winning the starting job as a defensive lineman in his last two years. He earned All-Ohio Athletic Conference honorable mention status following his senior season in which he recorded 80 tackles and six sacks. That year the Blue Streaks defense allowed a league-low 98 points in 10 games and enabled the John Carroll University football team to capture a share of the OAC championship. Roman finished his collegiate career with 145 tackles, 20.0 tackles-for-loss and 9.5 sacks.

Greg Roman is married to Dana, and they have three children, Connor, Gregory, and Emily.

== Coaching career ==
=== Carolina Panthers ===
Roman's first coaching job was with the Carolina Panthers in 1995, where he started as the unpaid strength and conditioning coach.

=== Houston Texans ===
In 2002, Roman was hired by the expansion Houston Texans as their tight ends and quarterbacks coach.

=== Baltimore Ravens (first stint) ===
In 2006, Roman was hired by the Baltimore Ravens as an offensive line assistant.

=== Holy Spirit HS ===
In 2008, Roman returned to his alma mater and served as the offensive coordinator at Holy Spirit High School.

=== Stanford ===
In 2009, Roman was hired and served for two years as associate head coach at Stanford, under head coach Jim Harbaugh. In 2010, Roman was a finalist for the Broyles Award, given annually to the nation's top college football assistant coach.

=== San Francisco 49ers ===
When Harbaugh left Stanford in 2011 to become head coach of the San Francisco 49ers, Roman followed and was named the offensive coordinator. He remained at the position until 2014.

=== Buffalo Bills ===
On January 12, 2015, Roman was hired by the Buffalo Bills to be their offensive coordinator under newly hired head coach Rex Ryan. On September 16, 2016, Roman was relieved of his duties after a 37–31 loss to the New York Jets.

=== Baltimore Ravens (second stint) ===
External videos
- Greg Roman's 2019 preseason press conference Ravens video

In 2017, the Ravens hired Roman as a senior offensive assistant and tight ends coach under head coach John Harbaugh; in 2018 he was promoted to assistant head coach and tight ends coach. In 2019, the Ravens opted to completely revamp the offense and the then offensive coordinator Marty Mornhinweg decided to retire. Roman, who had coached Colin Kaepernick at San Francisco, was promoted to offensive coordinator. He was tasked with the development of a new offense based on his experiences as a tight ends coach and in football theory. It was centered on the Ravens' new quarterback, Lamar Jackson and running back Mark Ingram II. In Roman's first full season in charge of the Ravens' offense, the team finished the season averaging 33.2 points per game; best in the NFL. The prolific season ended in a playoff exit that deviated from those run heavy schemes which became a notable point in the legacy of the achievements from that season.

On January 19, 2023, the Ravens announced that Roman had resigned as the team's offensive coordinator following the Ravens' loss in the Wild Card round of the 2022–23 NFL playoffs against the Cincinnati Bengals. Roman was replaced by Todd Monken, who installed a more passing oriented offense in Baltimore.

=== Los Angeles Chargers ===
On February 8, 2024, Roman was named as offensive coordinator for the Los Angeles Chargers under head coach Jim Harbaugh, with whom he had worked with while Harbaugh was head coach of the 49ers. He was fired on January 13, 2026, following a Wild Card loss to the New England Patriots by a score of 3–16.

=== New York Giants ===
On February 6, 2026, Roman was hired to serve as a senior offensive assistant for the New York Giants, reuniting him with John Harbaugh.
