= Jonathan Pitney =

American physician (1797–1869); "father" of Atlantic City, NJ

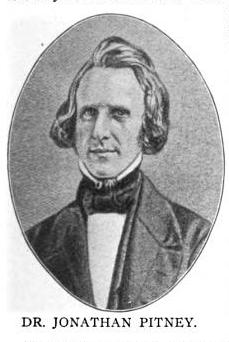
"Father of Atlantic City"

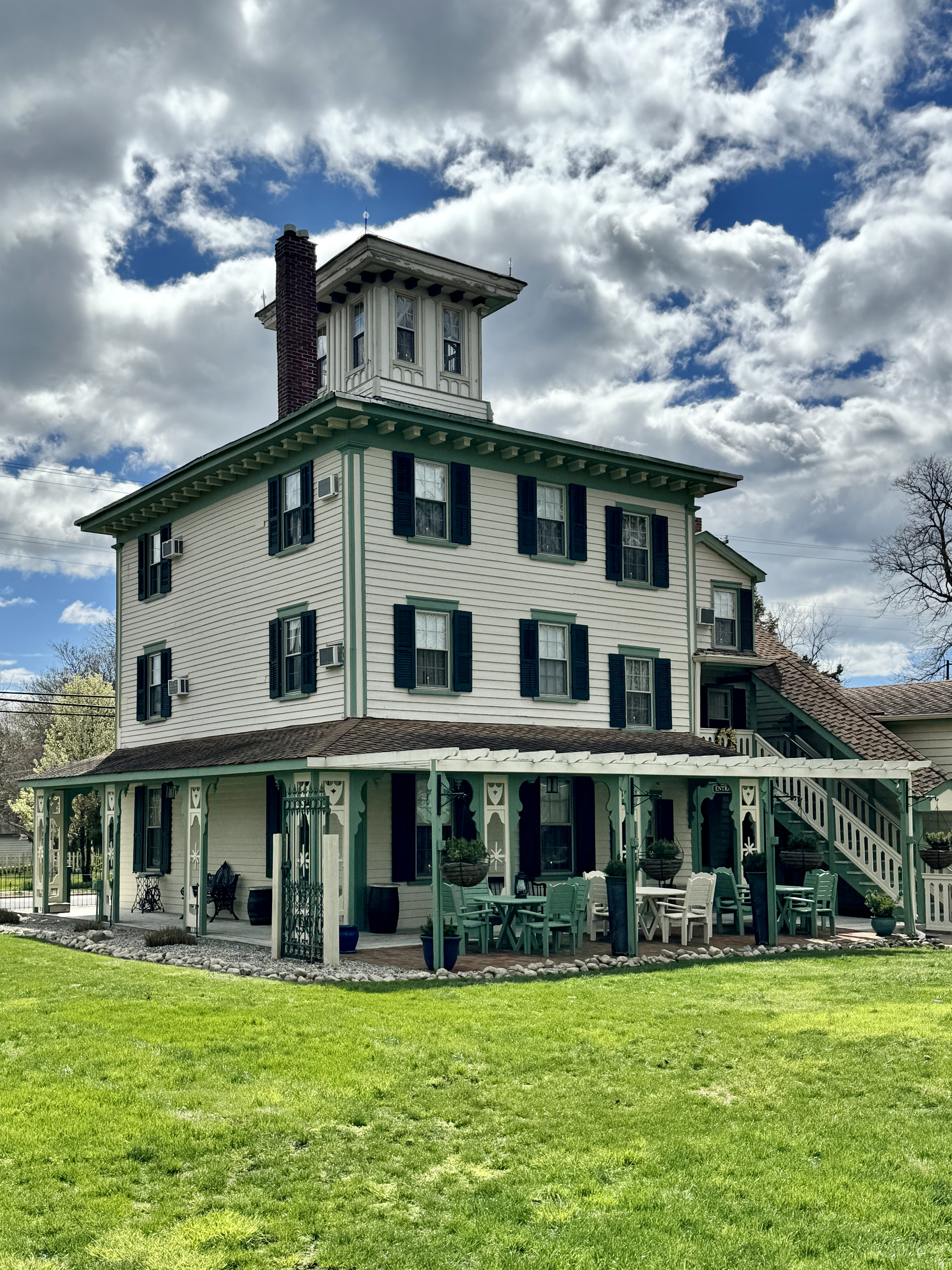
The historic Dr. Jonathan Pitney House

Dr. Jonathan Pitney (October 2 or 27 or 29, 1797 – August 7, 1869), considered the Father of Atlantic City, New Jersey, United States, was a medical doctor who promoted Absecon Island as a healing seashore resort.

== Biography ==
Born in Mendham Borough, New Jersey, on October 29 (or 27), 1797, he studied medicine at Columbia University under Valentine Mott. He moved to Absecon, New Jersey in 1819 and established his medical practice there. He was a delegate to the New Jersey Constitutional Convention in 1844 and was instrumental in lobbying for the construction of the Absecon Lighthouse in the aftermath of the Powhattan ship wreck

Pitney's main achievement was the promotion of Absecon Island as a shore medical retreat, with the help of civil engineer Richard Osborne and well-connected Richard Summers, they devised the idea creating a large scale resort. In 1853, he presented Osborne's designs for the city to Philadelphia railroad investors, which led to the creation of the Camden and Atlantic Railroad which opened on July 4, 1854, the same year Atlantic City, New Jersey, was officially incorporated. Pitney further promoted the Atlantic City resort by extolling the healing properties of salt water and ocean air. Dr. Pitney died in his Absecon home on August 7, 1869, the historic Dr. Jonathan Pitney House.
