= Atlantic County Library =

Coordinates: 39.383°N 74.554°W

Atlantic County Library System
- Established: 1926
- Branches: 10 branches, 1 reading center

Access and use
- Circulation: 542,373 (2022)
- Population served: 274,966 (2022): 38,849 card holders; 348,693 printed volumes owned; 19,101 audio volumes owned; 49,949 video volumes owned; 21 subscribed databases; 30,864 eBooks; 9,666 eAudiobooks; 3,896 eMagazines; 152,798 downloads or views in 9 digital media services; 165 public computers available with internet; 51,280 public computer uses; 86,540 WiFi sessions; 998 children programs; 491 adult programs

Other information
- Employees: 85 with 35+ hours per week (2022)
- Website: www.atlanticlibrary.org

Atlantic County Library System of Atlantic County, New Jersey is a public library system consisting of ten branches: Absecon, Brigantine, Egg Harbor City, Egg Harbor Township, Galloway Township, Hammonton, Mays Landing, Pleasantville, Somers Point, and Ventnor. The computerized public access catalog contains over 500,000 books, audio-visual and downloadable items. Atlantic County Library System also provides books-by-mail and other outreach services.

== History ==
The Atlantic County Library was founded in 1926 following a public referendum which was held in compliance with the law for establishing a county library. All communities were automatically included in the library’s services except Atlantic City which already had a municipal library. The first librarian was Jane Brown and the library’s first location was a room on the ground floor of the American Legion building on West Second Street in Mays Landing. By the end of 1926, the total collection was 13,000; there were four local libraries, eight deposit stations, 57 grammar schools with collections as well as four high schools with beginning collections.

The first Children’s Librarian was employed in 1930. The 1950s were the expansion years and the beginning of a building, equipment, and contingency fund. In 1952, the library owned 49,000 volumes and 5,543 requests. In 1967 grants of $15,000 were available which were renewable for five years; the county library received a grant to develop a good reference collection. The library was also able to purchase a new book truck partially using State Aid. In 1969 the library owned 80,977 volumes and circulated 241,143 materials.

The 1970s was a time for study, appeals, and plans. The library appealed a cut in State Aid allotment resulting in partial restitution of funds. The Library Commission formed a five year plan for improving staff, resources, and services in the libraries. Each year the size of the staff increased along with stock, equipment, and services. The Cape-Atlantic Consortium was formed in 1972 to apply for a grant for a Union Catalog of Reference Books. In 1973 the Commission obtained legal ruling on its autonomy and powers.

In 1979, the Atlantic County Library System took shape when the County Board of Chosen Freeholders passed a $3.75 million bond issue for construction of libraries in Hammonton, Egg Harbor Township, and Mays Landing. ACLS was the first library system in the state to be built on an innovative decentralized concept, building three regional libraries instead of one central library. In 1979 the Library Director, Joe Green, envisioned a new library system as a shift "from the time honored notion that library services should be provided where all patrons are expected to go for library services. That's an archaic belief in an electronic world." ACLS was also the first fully computerized public library system in New Jersey in 1980. Community libraries were linked through the computer system.

In 1983, a pre-fabricated building was erected in Brigantine, the first of its kind in New Jersey. In 1985 Galloway Township became a branch of the Atlantic County Library System and in 1990 a community branch in Longport was added.

== Branches ==
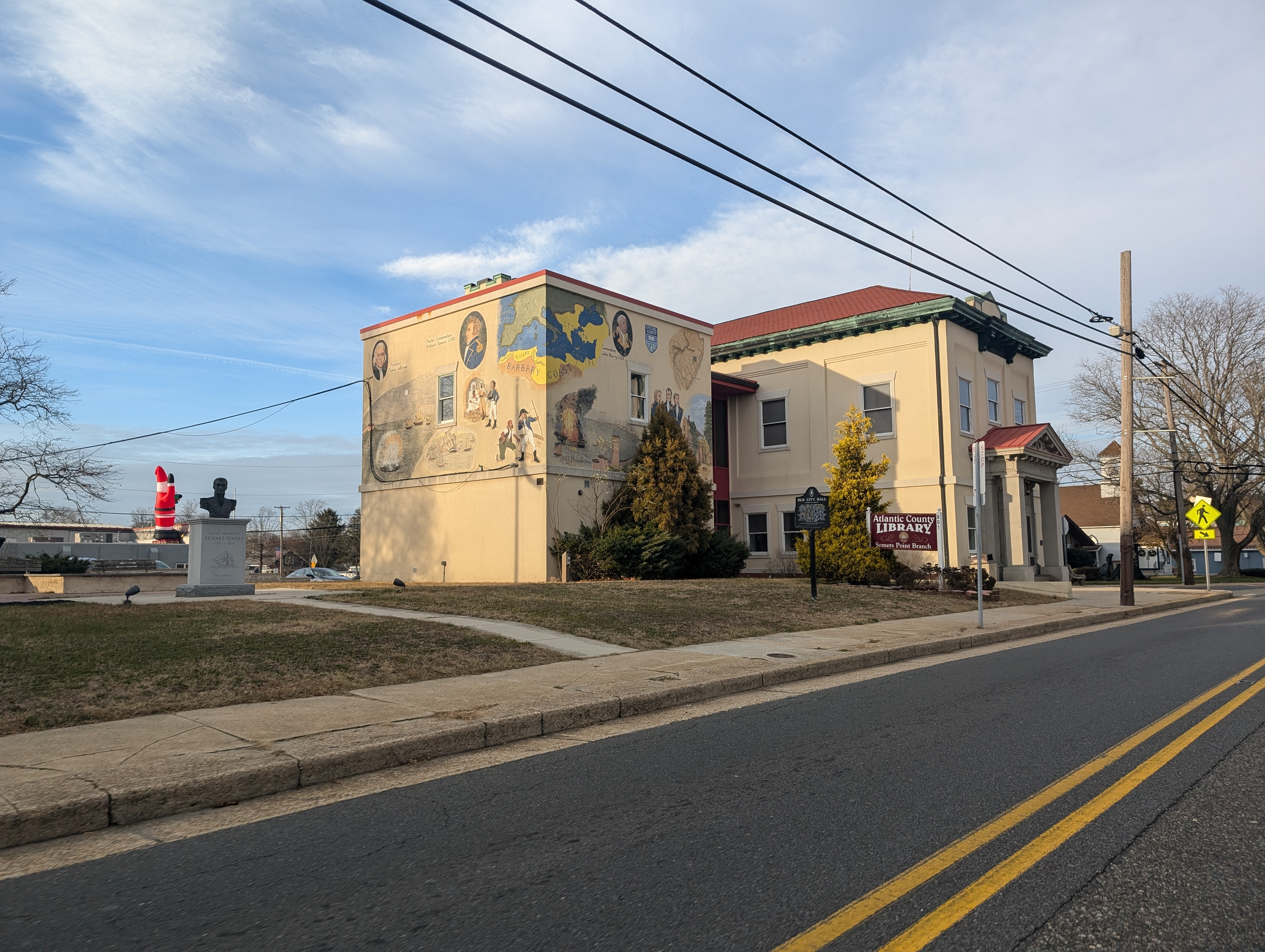
Somers Point Branch

Absecon Branch
305 New Jersey Ave., Absecon, NJ 08201
Brigantine Branch
201 15th St. South, Brigantine, NJ 08203
Egg Harbor City Branch
134 Philadelphia Ave., Egg Harbor City, NJ 08215
Egg Harbor Township Branch
1 Swift Ave., Egg Harbor Township, NJ 08234
Galloway Township Branch
306 E. Jimmie Leeds Rd., Galloway Township, NJ 08205
Hammonton Branch
451 Egg Harbor Rd., Hammonton, NJ 08037
Mays Landing Branch
40 Farragut Ave, Mays Landing, NJ 08330
Pleasantville Branch
33 Martin L. King Dr., Pleasantville, NJ 08232
Somers Point Branch
801 Shore Rd., Somers Point, NJ 08244
Ventnor Branch
6500 Atlantic Ave., Ventnor, NJ 08406

== Outreach and Services ==
=== Buena Community Reading Center ===
The Buena Community Reading Center is located in the Buena Regional High School in Buena, NJ. Outreach Services provides workshops and special story hours at the Buena Community Reading Center.

=== Books By Mail ===
Provides delivery service of library materials to homes of Atlantic County Library System patrons. This service benefits those in the community that cannot visit the branches due to physical hardships or otherwise.

=== Special collections ===
- Story Time Collection
- Coping for Children Collection: books that are issue related
- Bilingual Children's Books: Spanish and English
- Backpack Book Kits: includes books and physical items such as stuffed animals, musical instruments, and videos.
- Professional Collection: books on libraries and librarianship
- African-American Collection
- Poetry for Young People: the series
