= Clarks Landing =

Clarks Landing may refer to:

- Clarks Landing, Indiana
- Clarks Landing, Atlantic County, New Jersey
- Clarks Landing, Ocean County, New Jersey
