= John Roman =

American football player (born 1952)

No. 61
- Position: Offensive lineman

Personal information
- Born: August 31, 1952 (age 74); Ventnor City, New Jersey, U.S.
- Listed height: 6 ft 4 in (1.93 m)
- Listed weight: 255 lb (116 kg)

Career information
- High school: Holy Spirit (Absecon, New Jersey)
- College: Idaho State
- NFL draft: 1975: 13th round, 313th overall pick

Career history
- New York Jets (1976–1982)

Career NFL statistics
- Games played: 93
- Games started: 12
- Stats at Pro Football Reference

John George Roman (born August 31, 1952) is an American former professional football player who was an offensive lineman for seven seasons with the New York Jets of the National Football League (NFL) from 1976 to 1982. He played college football for the Idaho State Bengals.

Born in Ventnor City, New Jersey, and raised in nearby Absecon, New Jersey, Roman played prep football at Holy Spirit High School and then played collegiately at Idaho State University. A resident of Hamilton Township, Atlantic County, New Jersey, Idaho State University indicted him into its sports hall of fame in 1994.
