= The Pilgrim Academy =

Private school in Atlantic County, New Jersey, United States

Location
- 301 West Moss Mill Road; Egg Harbor City, Atlantic County, New Jersey 08215-3448; United States
- 39.5167°N 74.5395°W

Information
- Type: Private Christian
- Motto: Shaping Lives Through Christian Education
- Established: 1971
- NCES School ID: 00869615
- Headmaster: Christopher Storr
- Faculty: 30.1 FTEs
- Grades: PreK-12
- Enrollment: 334 (plus 17 in PreK, as of 2021–22)
- Student to teacher ratio: 11.1:1
- Colors: Red and White
- Nickname: Pilgrim
- Website: www.pilgrimacademy.org

The Pilgrim Academy is a private Christian school located in Egg Harbor City, in Atlantic County, in the U.S. state of New Jersey. Founded by Dr. Warren Allem in 1971, the school teaches children from kindergarten through twelfth grade. The school is accredited by the American Association of Christian Schools through September 2021. The school is also part of the Garden State Association of Christian Schools.

As of the 2021–22 school year, the school had an enrollment of 334 students (plus 17 in PreK) and 30.1 classroom teachers (on an FTE basis), for a student–teacher ratio of 11.1:1. The school's student body was 69.8% (233) White, 13.8% (46) Black, 12.0% (40) two or more races, 2.4% (8) Asian and 2.1% (8) Hispanic.

== Extracurricular activities ==
Sports include competitive soccer, basketball, baseball, and softball. Clubs include Art, Drama, Concert Choir, Handbell Ensemble, two levels of Orchestra, and a variety of religious groups.

== Administration ==
The school's headmaster is Christopher Storr.

Former headmasters include Dr. Warren Allem, Robert A. Peterson, John E. Sahl and Dr. Hubert Hartzler.
