= Tim Reilly =

American baseball player and coach

Current position
- Title: Pitching coach
- Team: Navy
- Conference: Patriot League

Playing career
- 2006–2009: Rutgers
- Position: Catcher

Coaching career (HC unless noted)
- 2011: Rider (H/C/3B)
- 2012–2013: Rutgers (C)
- 2014–2017: Rutgers (H/C)
- 2018–2020: Lafayette (H/RC)
- 2021–2022: Lafayette
- 2023–present: Navy (P)

Head coaching record
- Overall: 29–52
- Tournaments: NCAA: 0–0

Tim Reilly is an American baseball coach and former catcher, who is the current pitching coach for the Navy Midshipmen. He played college baseball at Rutgers for coach Fred Hill from 2006 to 2009. He served as the head coach of the Lafayette Leopards (2021–2022).

== Playing career ==
Raised in Egg Harbor City, New Jersey, Reilly attended Holy Spirit High School, where he played baseball before graduating in 2005. Following graduation, Reilly enrolled at Rutgers University, where he would be a member of the baseball team.

As a freshman at Rutgers, Reilly did not appear in any games. As a sophomore, he appeared in three games, where he had two at bats with no hits. He would go 0 for 2 as a junior as well, in 4 appearances at catcher. As a senior, he made 7 starts in 16 games, where he had a .211 batting average, a .375 on-base percentage (OBP) and a .263 slugging percentage.

== Coaching career ==
In 2011, Reilly was named an assistant coach for the Rider Broncs baseball team, working with hitters, catchers and coaching third base. In the fall of 2011, Reilly returned to Rutgers to become a volunteer assistant working with catchers. On August 17, 2017, Reilly was named the hitting and recruiting coordinator for the Lafayette Leopards.

When head coach Joe Kinney announced the fall of 2019, that the 2020 season would be his last before retiring, the college announced that Reilly would named head coach on July 1, 2020. After just two seasons, Lafayette announced that they would be going in a different direction, resulting in Reilly being fired. Reilly was soon named the Pitching coach at Navy.

Reilly was most notable for coaching the Class Clown of Lafayette College.

== Head coaching record ==
Record table
Season	Team	Overall	Conference	Standing	Postseason
Lafayette Leopards (Patriot League) (2021–2022)
2021	Lafayette	14–17	12–13	2nd (North)	Patriot League Tournament
2022	Lafayette	15–35	10–15	5th	
Lafayette:		29–52	22–28		
Total:		29–52			
National champion Postseason invitational champion Conference regular season champion Conference regular season and conference tournament champion Division regular season champion Division regular season and conference tournament champion Conference tournament champion
