= Hilary Tompkins =

American lawyer and government official

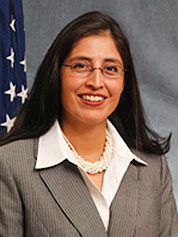

Solicitor of the U.S. Department of the Interior
- In office June 2009 – January 2017
- President: Barack Obama
- Preceded by: David Bernhardt
- Succeeded by: Daniel Jorjani

Personal details
- Born: Zuni, New Mexico, U.S.
- Citizenship: Navajo Nation; United States
- Education: Dartmouth College; Stanford University

Hilary Chandler Tompkins is an American lawyer who served as the solicitor of the U.S. Department of the Interior from 2009 to 2017. A citizen of the Navajo Nation, she was the first Native American woman to hold the position of solicitor. Prior to her federal service, she served as chief legal counsel to New Mexico Governor Bill Richardson. Tompkins became a partner at Hogan Lovells in 2017.

== Early life and education ==
Tompkins was born in Zuni, Ramah Chapter of the Navajo Reservation in New Mexico. Her birth mother made the decision to give her up at birth, and she was adopted a few months later by Nancy and Kenneth Tompkins, a Quaker family. Her father, Kenneth, was a professor of medieval literature at a liberal arts college, and her mother, Nancy, operated a preschool.

Raised in Absecon, New Jersey, Tompkins grew up in a vegetarian household with an older brother and a younger brother and sister from Puerto Rico. She did not meet another Native American person until she was 15 years old, when she attended a Quaker boarding school in Pennsylvania for one year. She completed her secondary education at Holy Spirit High School, a Catholic school near Absecon.

Tompkins attended Dartmouth College, where she initially considered a career in the foreign service. She lived in Topliff Hall and attended the college during a period of campus controversy regarding the school's Indian mascot. She was the first student hired by N. Bruce Duthu, a professor and associate dean who became a mentor. She earned a bachelor's degree in political science and government in 1990, funding her education in part through the Navajo Nation's Chief Manuelito Scholarship. She subsequently earned a J.D. from Stanford Law School in 1996, where she served as an associate editor of the Stanford Law Review and met her future husband, Michael Prindle.

== Career ==
=== Early career ===
After graduating from college in 1990, Tompkins worked as a paralegal at a law firm in New York City. She returned to the Navajo Nation, working as a law clerk for the Navajo Nation Supreme Court and as a tribal court advocate for the U.S. Department of Justice in the early 1990s. During her three years in Window Rock, Arizona, she handled cases involving disadvantaged families and negotiated tribal borders, utilizing a legal framework that blended elements of both U.S. and tribal law.

Tompkins began her legal career in the honors program at the U.S. Department of Justice Environment and Natural Resources Division, serving as a trial attorney. She served as an assistant U.S. Attorney in Brooklyn, New York. She was recruited by a Washington, D.C.-based law firm specializing in Indian law to work in their Albuquerque, New Mexico branch. Tompkins has also served as an adjunct professor at the University of New Mexico School of Law.

Tompkins joined the administration of New Mexico Governor Bill Richardson, initially serving as deputy counsel before becoming chief counsel in April 2005. In this capacity, she negotiated gaming compacts between the state of New Mexico and tribal nations.

=== U.S. Department of Interior ===
In June 2009, the U.S. Senate confirmed Tompkins as the solicitor of the U.S. Department of the Interior. Her confirmation was temporarily delayed by Republican senator Tom Coburn of Oklahoma, who raised concerns regarding whether she would uphold legislation prohibiting the Interior Department from banning firearms in national parks and wildlife refuges. She served in this role until January 2017, becoming the first Native American woman to hold the position. As solicitor, she led over 300 attorneys.

During her tenure, Tompkins played a role in resolving the Cobell v. Salazar trust fund lawsuit, as well as over 100 other tribal trust fund lawsuits, with settlements totaling more than $6.7 billion. The Cobell settlement established a $60 million scholarship fund that has benefited over 1,000 Native American students. Her work also included developing legal reforms following the Deepwater Horizon oil spill, defending renewable energy projects on public lands, and providing legal clearance for the establishment of national monuments, including the Harriet Tubman Underground Railroad National Historical Park, the César E. Chávez National Monument, and the Rio Grande del Norte National Monument.

Following the United States Supreme Court decision in Carcieri v. Salazar, she issued a solicitor's opinion establishing a test to evaluate the eligibility of tribes to take land into trust. Additionally, she authored a legal opinion supporting treaty rights regarding the Dakota Access Pipeline. During her service, Interior secretary Ken Salazar noted her potential as a candidate for the U.S. Supreme Court or a high-ranking position in a future administration.

=== Private practice ===
In March 2017, Tompkins joined the law firm Hogan Lovells as a partner. She serves in the firm's environment practice group and heads the Native American practice area.

Tompkins serves as a trustee for Dartmouth College, having been elected as an alumni trustee in 2019. She is the first Native American member of the Dartmouth Board of Trustees. She also sits on the boards of the Environmental Law Institute and the Conservation Lands Foundation.

== Personal life ==
Tompkins is an enrolled member of the Navajo Nation and identifies with the Salt Clan. She reunited with her birth parents as an adult, and they helped organize her wedding to Michael Prindle in 2000, which was held as a traditional Navajo ceremony in Ramah, New Mexico. On August 20, 2009, Navajo Nation president Joe Shirley Jr. proclaimed the date "Hilary C. Tompkins Day."
