= Holy Spirit High School (New Jersey) =

High school in Atlantic County, New Jersey, US

Location
- 500 South New Road; Absecon, Atlantic County, New Jersey 08201; United States
- 39°25′2″N 74°30′35″W

Information
- Type: Preparatory School, Coeducational
- Motto: Caritas Omnia Vincit (Love conquers all)
- Religious affiliation: Roman Catholic
- Established: 1922
- School district: Diocese of Camden
- CEEB code: 310025
- NCES School ID: 00864978
- President: Perry Cherubini
- Dean: Dennis Smith
- Principal: Thomas J. Farren Sr.
- Faculty: 32.3 FTEs
- Grades: 9–12
- Enrollment: 391 (as of 2017–18)
- Student to teacher ratio: 12.1:1
- Colors: Navy and Vegas gold
- Athletics conference: Cape-Atlantic League (general); West Jersey Football League (football)
- Team name: Spartans
- Rival: St. Joseph High School
- Accreditation: Middle States Association of Colleges and Schools
- Tuition: $10,200 (2022–23)
- Website: www.holyspirithighschool.com

Holy Spirit High School is a Roman Catholic preparatory school located in Absecon in Atlantic County, in the U.S. state of New Jersey. The school operates under the jurisdiction of the Diocese of Camden. The school's motto is Caritas Omnia Vincit, which translates to "love conquers all". The school has been accredited by the Middle States Association of Colleges and Schools Commission on Elementary and Secondary Schools since 1971; the school's accreditation status was extended for seven years in Fall 2018.

As of the 2017–18 school year, the school had an enrollment of 391 students and 32.3 classroom teachers (on an FTE basis), for a student–teacher ratio of 12.1:1. The school's student body was 78.0% (305) White, 6.4% (25) Asian, 5.6% (22) Black, 4.1% (16) Hispanic and 5.9% (23) two or more races.

The school is under the limited governance of an independent Board of Trustees. The President/Principal serves as the Chairman of the Board of Trustees and the chief administrative officer.

== History ==
The school was founded in 1922 in Atlantic City and moved to Absecon in 1964.

== Athletics ==
The Holy Spirit High School Spartans compete in the National Division of the Cape-Atlantic League, an athletic conference comprised of public and private high schools in Atlantic, Cape May, Cumberland and Gloucester counties that operates under the aegis of the New Jersey State Interscholastic Athletic Association. With 281 students in grades 10-12, the school was classified by the NJSIAA for the 2019–20 school year as Non-Public B for most athletic competition purposes, which included schools with an enrollment of 37 to 366 students in that grade range (equivalent to Group I for public schools). The football team competes in the Continental Division of the 94-team West Jersey Football League superconference and was classified by the NJSIAA as Non-Public Group B (equivalent to Group I/II for public schools) for football for 2024–2026, which included schools with 140 to 686 students.

The boys track team won the Non-Public A spring / outdoor track state championship in 1947.

The football team won the Non-Public A South state sectional championships in 1974 (awarded by the NJSIAA), 1975, 1978, 1987, 1988 and 1990, won the Non-Public III title in 2007, 2008, and 2010, and the Non-Public Group II state title in 2011, 2012 and 2019. The 1987 football team won the Parochial A state title by defeating Notre Dame High School by a score of 15–8. The 2007 team finished the season with a record of 12-0 and won the Non-Public, Group III state sectional championship with a 26–13 win over Immaculata High School. The undefeated season and state championship were both firsts in team history. After scoring on the opening kickoff, the 2012 team went on to win the Non-Public III state title with a 30-6 win against Immaculata in the championship game to finish the season with an 8-4 record. The 2019 team won the Non-Public Group II title with a 38-0 finals win against St. Joseph High School. Though only dating to 2000, NJ.com ranked the "Holy War" rivalry between Holy Spirit and St. Joseph 11th on its list "Ranking the 31 fiercest rivalries in N.J. HS football", with St. Joseph winning 12 of the 18 games played through 2017.

In the 1970s through the late 1980s, Holy Spirit made a name for itself in boys' rowing, winning several national championships and competing several times at the Henley Regatta on the River Thames by the town of Henley-on-Thames, England. This rowing success led to an entry in The Official Preppy Handbook in 1980. The boys' rowing team has competed for the Princess Elizabeth Challenge Cup at Henley six times 1970, 1974, 1976, 1981, 1982, and 2003. The team won in 1974, 1976, and 1981; in addition to finishing second twice, in a race in which the winner is widely considered to be the best youth crew in the world. Holy Spirit's three titles is tied with St. Paul's School for the most by any American high school. Coach Stan Bergman led the team to all three Henley victories.

The girls eight-person rowing team won the Peabody Cup at the 2003 Henley Women's Regatta, defeating the Kingston School of England. Their coach, Joseph Welsh Jr., was a member of the boys team at Holy Spirit when it won a similar championship at Henley in 1976. The girls eight-person rowing team repeated the win of the Peabody Cup at the 2004 Henley Women's Regatta; this time defeating a fellow US team, St. Andrew's School of Delaware. The girl's four-person sweeping boat rowing team placed second in the National Scholastic Rowing Championship in 2019.

The baseball team won the Non-Public A state championship in 1980 (defeating runner-up Don Bosco Preparatory High School in the finals of the tournament) and 1982 (vs. Essex Catholic High School), and won the Non-Public B title in 2015 (vs. Newark Academy) and 2021 (vs. Morristown–Beard School). Down 4-0 in the first inning in the championship game at Mercer County Park, the 1982 team came back to tie the score and win the Parochial A state title with a 7-4 win against Essex Catholic. The team finished the 2015 season with a 14–16 record, winning the Non-Public B South Jersey final by a score of 7–1 against Marist High School and then won the Non-Public B state championship for the first time in 33 seasons with a 9–4 win against Newark Academy in the playoff finals.

The field hockey team won the Parochial A South state sectional championships in 1982.

The 2005 softball team won the Non-Public, South B state sectional championship with a 10–6 win over St. Joseph High School in the tournament final.

The boys' swimming team won the Non-Public A state championship in 2000 and 2001 and the Non-Public B state championship in 2002, 2003, 2005 and 2006. The 2006 title came in a 95.5–74.5 tournament win over Bishop Eustace High School.

In 2004, the girls' soccer team won their first Cape Atlantic League championship, beating Ocean City High School 4–1, after having lost in the league's title game in each of the four previous years. In 2016, the girls' soccer team won the South Jersey Non-Public B final against Our Lady of Mercy Academy 4–1 after losing the previous year to Moorestown Friends. This was the first time Spartan girls' soccer has won this title and the first time the team went to the New Jersey Non-Public B state final.

In 2006, the boys' basketball team brought home the school's first Cape Atlantic League championship after defeating their rival Atlantic City High School, finishing the season with a record of 26–3.

The girls' swimming team won the Non Public A state championship in 2007 with a 102–68 win against Red Bank Catholic High School.

The 2007 girls' tennis team took the South A state sectional championship with a 3–2 win over Notre Dame High School in the tournament final.

The wrestling team won the Non-Public B South state sectional championship in 2016, 2017 and 2018.

== Notable alumni ==
- Terry Bradway (born 1955), American football executive who was the general manager for the New York Jets of the NFL from 2001 to 2006
- B. J. Callaghan (born 1981/1982), association football manager who was named as the interim head coach of the United States men's national soccer team in May 2023
- Joe Callahan (born 1993), football quarterback who played for the Green Bay Packers
- Lawrence J. Delaney (born 1935), scientist and businessman who served as Assistant Secretary of the Air Force (Acquisition)
- Chris Ford (1949-2023), NBA basketball player and head coach who made the first official three-point shot in NBA history
- Toni Ann Gisondi (born 1972), actress best known for her role as Molly in the 1982 film Annie
- William Green (born 1979), running back who currently is a free agent of the NFL
- Roscoe Hansen (1929–2020), American football tackle who played in the NFL for the Philadelphia Eagles
- Brigid Callahan Harrison (born 1965, class of 1983), academic, author and political commentator
- Dennis Horner (born 1988), basketball player who played for the NBA's New Jersey Nets
- Brian Joo (born 1981), of Fly to the Sky, American R&B and South Korean pop (a.k.a. K-pop) recording artist and entertainer who is based in the United States and South Korea
- Amy Kennedy (born 1978, class of 1997), educator, mental health advocate and politician who is the Democratic Party nominee in the 2020 elections for New Jersey's 2nd congressional district
- Phil Leonetti (born 1953), former Philadelphia crime family underboss
- Brittany Lee Lewis (born 1990, class of 2008), professor, television personality, domestic violence advocate, Miss Delaware 2014 and Miss Black America 2017
- Michelle Malkin (born 1970), political commentator and author
- Don McGahn (born 1968), White House Counsel and Assistant to the President for U.S. President Donald Trump and a former Commissioner of the United States Federal Election Commission
- Joseph McGahn (1917–1999), obstetrician and politician who served in the New Jersey Senate from 1972 to 1978
- John P. O'Neill (1952–2001), FBI Terrorist Specialist, Director of Security World Trade Center, died in the September 11th, 2001 terrorist attacks
- Tim Reilly (class of 2005), head coach of the Lafayette Leopards baseball team
- Greg Roman (born 1972), offensive coordinator for the Baltimore Ravens
- John Roman (born 1952), former professional American football offensive lineman who played seven seasons in the NFL for the New York Jets
- Ralph L. Sacco (1957–2023), neurologist, who served as president of the American Heart Association
- Nicky Scarfo Jr. (born 1964), former Philadelphia crime family associate and Lucchese crime family soldier
- Hilary Tompkins, lawyer who served as the solicitor of the U.S. Department of the Interior
- Stephanie Williams (born 1986), Miss District of Columbia 2010
