= Joe Callahan (American football) =

American football player (born 1993)

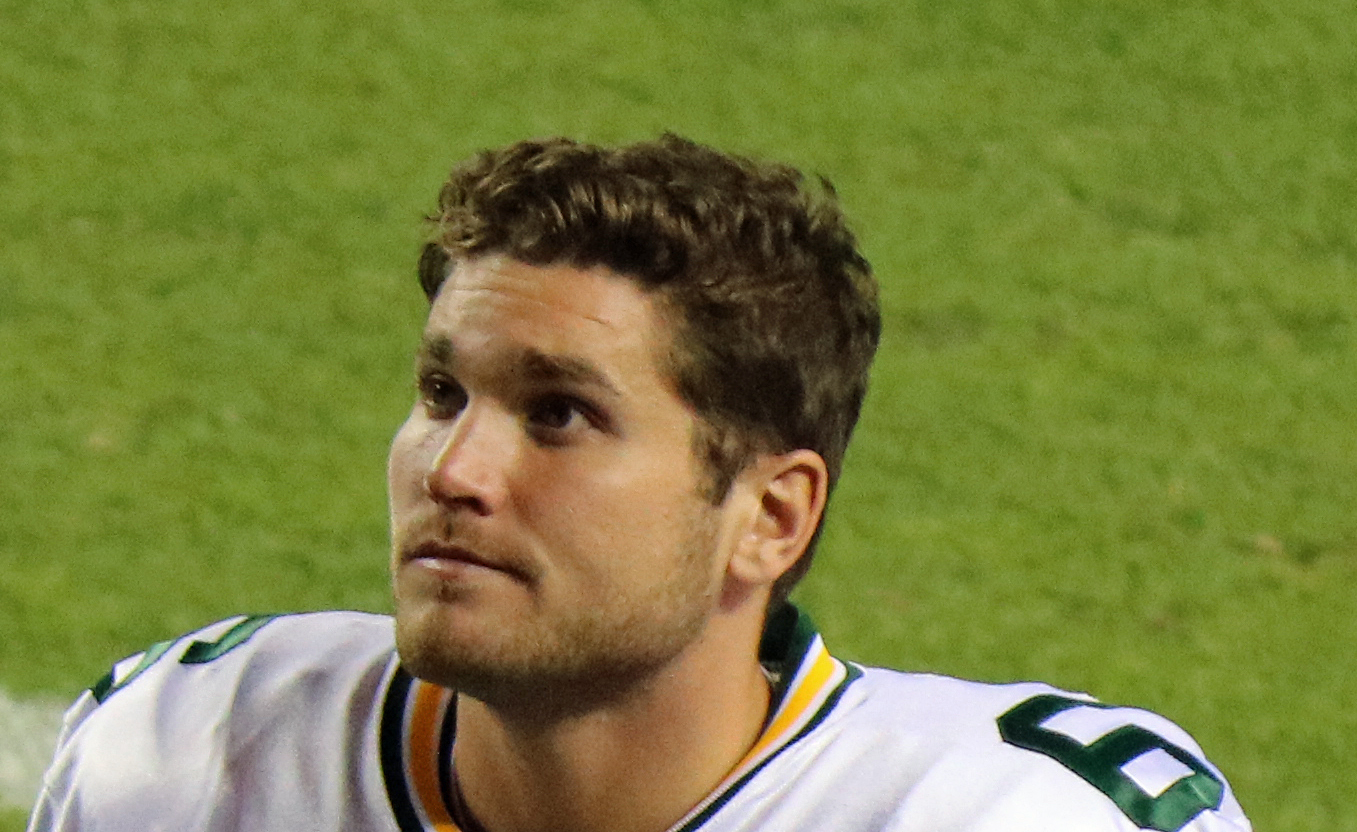
- Callahan with the Green Bay Packers in 2017

No. 6, 18, 3, 2
- Position: Quarterback

Personal information
- Born: June 4, 1993 (age 33); Cape May Court House, New Jersey, U.S.
- Listed height: 6 ft 1 in (1.85 m)
- Listed weight: 216 lb (98 kg)

Career information
- High school: Holy Spirit (Absecon, New Jersey)
- College: Wesley (DE) (2011–2015)
- NFL draft: 2016: undrafted

Career history
- Green Bay Packers (2016); New Orleans Saints (2016); Cleveland Browns (2016); Green Bay Packers (2016–2017); Philadelphia Eagles (2018)*; Tampa Bay Buccaneers (2019)*; Baltimore Ravens (2019)*; Detroit Lions (2019)*; Seattle Dragons (2020)*; Team 9 (2020)*
- * Offseason or practice squad member only

Awards and highlights
- Gagliardi Trophy (2015)

Career NFL statistics
- Passing attempts: 7
- Passing completions: 5
- Completion percentage: 71.4%
- TD–INT: 0–0
- Passing yards: 11
- Passer rating: 74.1
- Stats at Pro Football Reference

Francis Joseph Callahan (born June 4, 1993) is an American former professional football player who was a quarterback in the National Football League (NFL). He played college football for the Wesley Wolverines, a Division III program in Dover, Delaware. He was signed by the Green Bay Packers as an undrafted free agent in 2016, and was briefly a member of the New Orleans Saints, Cleveland Browns, Philadelphia Eagles, Tampa Bay Buccaneers, Baltimore Ravens, Detroit Lions, and Seattle Dragons.

== Early life ==
Francis Joseph Callahan was born on June 4, 1993, in Cape May Court House, New Jersey. He attended Holy Spirit High School in his hometown of Absecon, New Jersey.

== College career ==
After graduation from Holy Spirit High, Callahan appeared in four games for Wesley as a true freshman in 2011. He completed three of nine throws for 26 yards but missed the entire next season with an injury and redshirted.

In 2013, Callahan started all thirteen games for the Wolverines and completed 269 of 461 attempts for 3,599 yards and 29 touchdowns. He set Wesley single-season records in completions and attempts and ranked second in single-season passing yards. In his first career start against Widener, he threw for 510 yards and five touchdowns. In the following week, Callahan led the Wolverines to victory with a 43-yard Hail Mary touchdown on fourth and 21 with under a minute remaining to beat archrival Salisbury. Callahan also helped the Wolverines beat the Division I Charlotte 49ers 35–28. In that game, he passed for 317 yards, threw two touchdowns, and ran for another two. In the Division III playoffs, Wesley beat Johns Hopkins 29–24 in the first round; Callahan threw a 33-yard touchdown pass with 0:13 remaining and finished with 244 passing yards and four touchdowns. Wesley faced Mount Union in the NCAA quarterfinals. Behind 31–0 after the first quarter, the Wolverines fell short by just three, 62–59; Mount Union recovered an unsuccessful onside kick with ninety seconds remaining. Callahan set school and NCAA playoff records with 633 passing yards and eight passing touchdowns.

As a redshirt junior in 2014, Callahan threw for 4,190 yards and 46 touchdowns with 10 interceptions, making it the best season ever for a Wesley quarterback. In the fourth game, Wesley beat Southern Virginia 47–7, with Callahan passing for 339 yards and five touchdowns. He went on to have 300 yards or more in the first five games of the season. Callahan once again faced D-I Charlotte in the regular season, this time in the season finale. He threw for a total of 336 yards and two touchdowns with pair of rushing touchdowns in the Wolverines' 38–33 loss. Callahan and the Wolverines dominated in their first three playoff games, outscoring opponents 152–20 until losing again to Mount Union, this time by a wider margin, 70–21.

Returning for a fifth year in 2015, Callahan threw for 5,063 yards and 55 touchdowns and led Wesley back to the D-III playoffs. He was awarded the Gagliardi Trophy, considered the Heisman Trophy for Division III, and became the first D-III player to throw for over 5,000 yards in a season.

== Professional career ==
Pre-draft measurables
Height	Weight	Arm length	Hand span	Wingspan	40-yard dash	10-yard split	20-yard split	20-yard shuttle	Three-cone drill	Vertical jump	Broad jump	Bench press	Wonderlic
6 ft 1 1/8 in (1.86 m)	216 lb (98 kg)	30 1/4 in (0.77 m)	9 1/2 in (0.24 m)	6 ft 0 5/8 in (1.84 m)	4.98 s	1.78 s	2.81 s	4.70 s	7.47 s	33 in (0.84 m)	8 ft 11 in (2.72 m)	18 reps	24
All values from Pro Day

=== Green Bay Packers (first stint) ===
Not selected in the 2016 NFL draft, Callahan signed as a free agent with the Green Bay Packers on May 6. He threw for 499 yards, three touchdowns, and zero interceptions in the preseason, earning him a spot on the Packers' 53-man roster. He was released by the Packers on October 13.

=== New Orleans Saints ===
On October 14, Callahan was claimed off waivers by the New Orleans Saints, and waived by the team on October 22.

=== Cleveland Browns ===
Callahan was claimed off waivers by the Cleveland Browns on October 24, and released by the team on November 28.

=== Green Bay Packers (second stint) ===
On December 2, Callahan was signed to the Packers' practice squad, and was promoted to the active roster on December 17, 2016.

On September 2, 2017, Callahan was waived by the Packers and was signed to the practice squad the next day. After starter Aaron Rodgers suffered a broken collarbone in Week 6 against the Minnesota Vikings, head coach Mike McCarthy stated that Brett Hundley would take over as starter and Callahan would be Hundley's backup. Callahan was promoted to the active roster the following day. On December 16, 2017, with Hundley still maintaining his position as the Packers' second-string quarterback and the return of Aaron Rodgers from injured reserve, Callahan was cut to make room for Rodgers. However, three days later on December 19, the Packers re-signed Callahan after Rodgers was placed back on injured reserve. Callahan made his NFL debut on December 31, completing 5 of 7 passes for 11 yards.

On April 30, 2018, Callahan was waived by the Packers.

=== Philadelphia Eagles ===
On May 7, 2018, Callahan signed a two-year contract with the Philadelphia Eagles. He was waived on September 1, 2018.

=== Tampa Bay Buccaneers ===
On January 3, 2019, Callahan signed a reserve/future contract with the Tampa Bay Buccaneers. On April 26, 2019, the Buccaneers waived Callahan.

=== Baltimore Ravens ===
On July 29, 2019, Callahan was signed by the Baltimore Ravens. He was waived during final roster cuts on August 30, 2019.

=== Detroit Lions ===
On November 30, 2019, Callahan was signed to the Detroit Lions. His practice squad contract with the team expired on January 6, 2020.

=== Seattle Dragons ===
Callahan was selected by the Seattle Dragons of the XFL during the 2020 XFL draft's open phase. He signed a contract with the team on January 13, 2020. He was waived during final roster cuts on January 22, 2020.

=== Team 9 ===
Callahan was signed to the XFL's practice squad team, referred to as Team 9, on January 30, 2020. He had his contract terminated when the league suspended operations on April 10, 2020.

== Career statistics ==
=== NFL ===
Year	Team	Games		Passing							
Year	Team	GP	GS	Cmp	Att	Pct	Yds	Avg	TD	Int	Rtg
2017	GB	1	0	5	7	71.4	11	1.6	0	0	74.1
Total		1	0	5	7	71.4	11	1.6	0	0	74.1
Source: NFL.com

=== College ===
Season	Team	Games		Passing								Rushing			
Season	Team	GP	Record	Comp	Att	Pct	Yards	Avg	TD	Int	Rate	Att	Yards	Avg	TD
2011	Wesley	4	0–0	3	9	33.3	26	2.9	0	0	57.6	0	0	0.0	0
2012	Wesley	DNP													
2013	Wesley	13	10–3	269	461	58.4	3,599	7.8	29	16	137.7	80	109	1.4	6
2014	Wesley	13	12–1	261	394	66.2	3,750	9.5	45	6	180.8	50	114	2.3	4
2015	Wesley	13	11–2	346	496	69.8	5,068	10.2	55	12	187.3	92	398	4.3	7
Career		43	32−6	879	1,360	64.8	12,443	9.2	129	34	168.5	222	621	2.8	7
