= Dr. Jonathan Pitney House =

Historic home in New Jersey, US

- U.S. National Register of Historic Places
- New Jersey Register of Historic Places
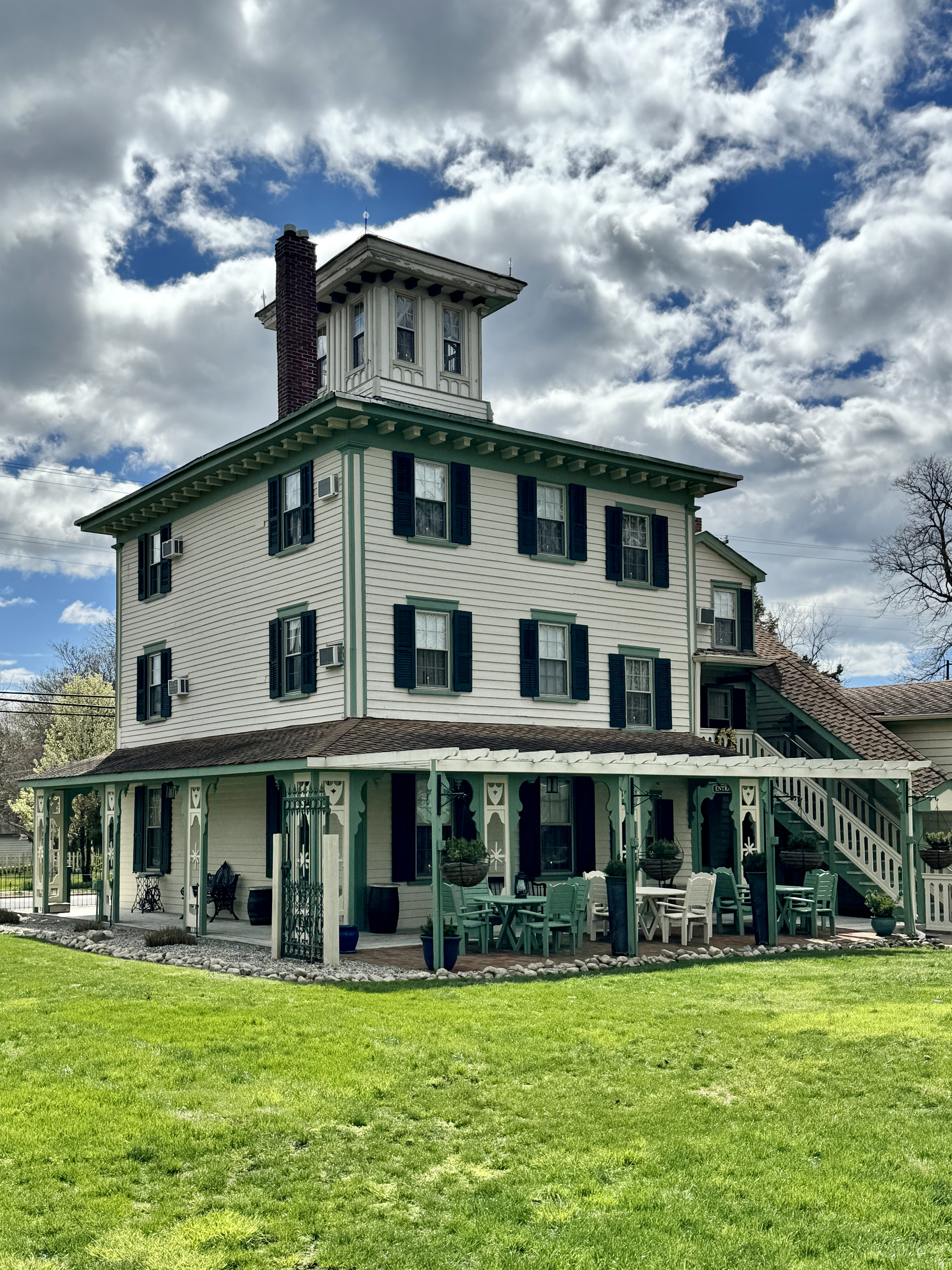
- The house in 2024

- Location within Atlantic County, New Jersey Location within New Jersey Location within the United States
- Location: 57 North Shore Road, Absecon City, New Jersey
- Coordinates: 39°25′30.7″N 74°29′55.3″W
- Built: 1799
- Architect: Samuel Reed
- NRHP reference No.: 98001062
- NJRHP No.: 1838

Significant dates
- Added to NRHP: August 14, 1998
- Designated NJRHP: June 26, 1998

The Dr. Jonathan Pitney House is a historic residence located at 57 North Shore Road in Absecon in Atlantic County, New Jersey. It was listed on the National Register of Historic Places on August 14, 1998, for its significance in transportation and politics/government.

== History and description ==
The house was owned by Jonathan Pitney, referred to as the Father of Atlantic City, New Jersey. He promoted Absecon as a health resort. The home was converted into a bed and breakfast in 1995.

The oldest part of the house was built by Samuel Read in 1799. Pitney initially rented the home in 1820. He purchased it in 1824 and enlarged it 1848. He died in 1869.

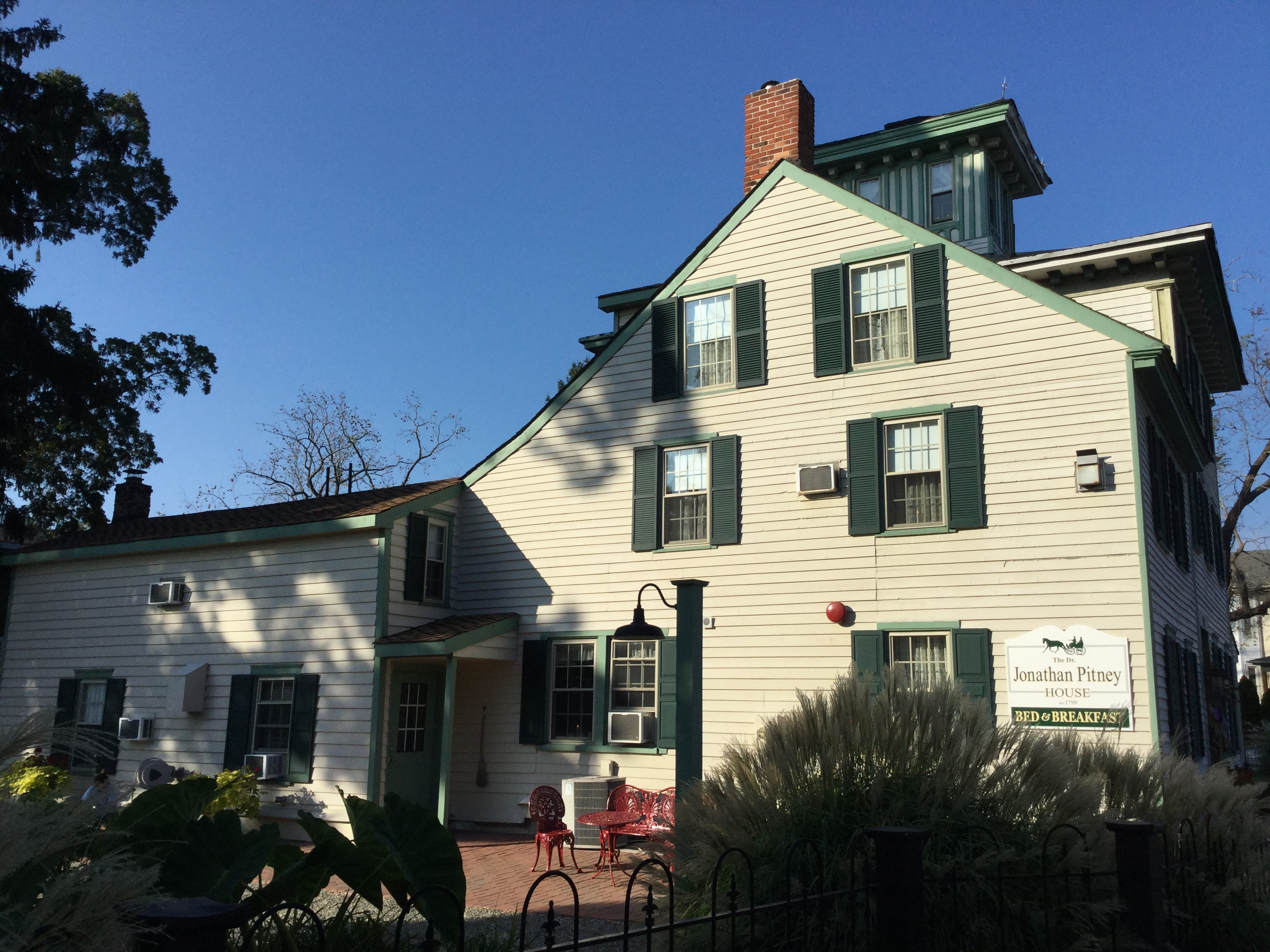
The south side of the Dr. Jonathan Pitney House

== See also ==
- National Register of Historic Places listings in Atlantic County, New Jersey
