= Absecon, New Jersey =

City in Atlantic County, New Jersey, US

- City
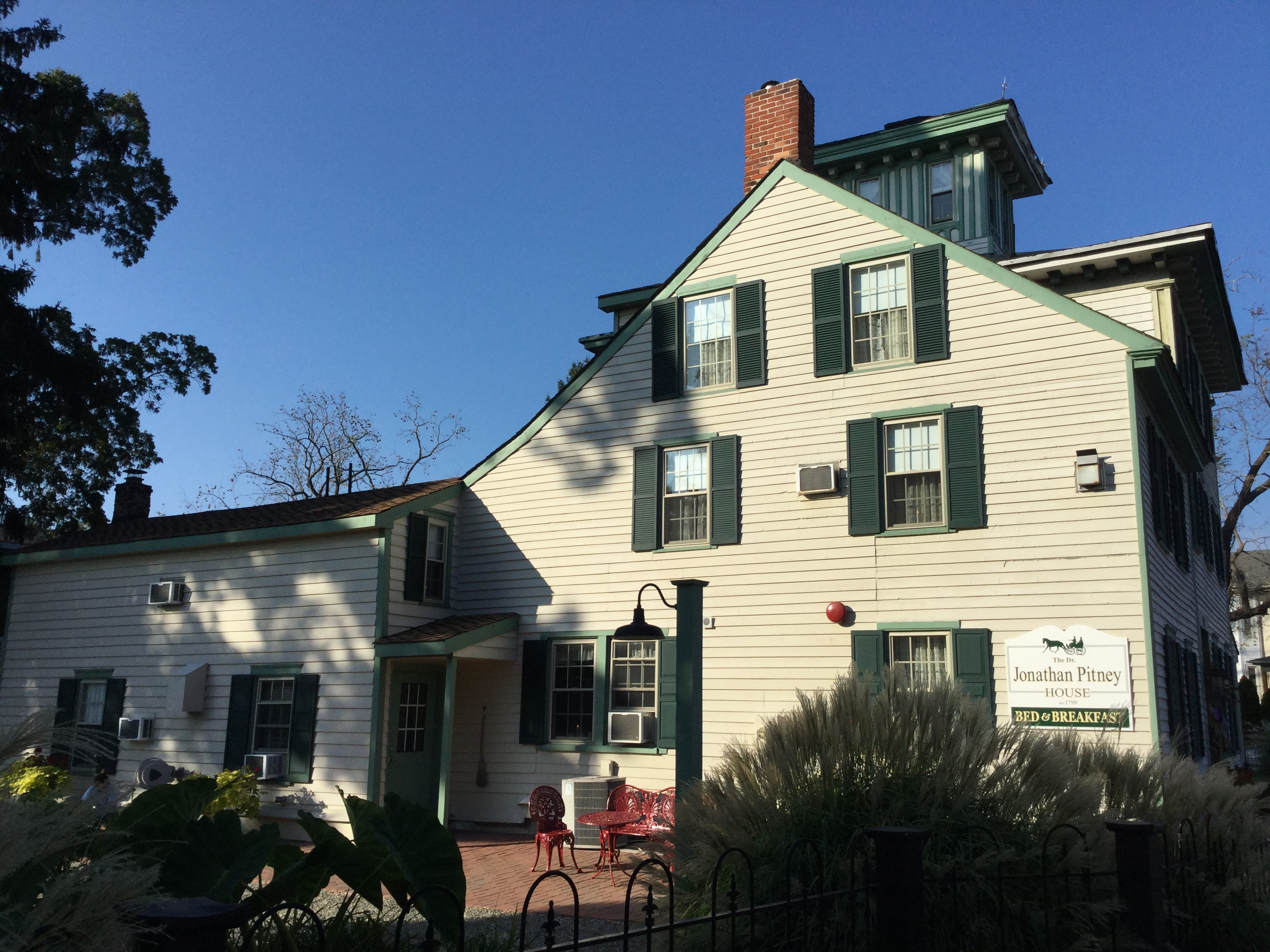
- Dr. Jonathan Pitney House, south side (2021)

- Seal

- Location of Absecon in Atlantic County highlighted in red (left). Inset map: Location of Atlantic County in New Jersey highlighted in orange (right).

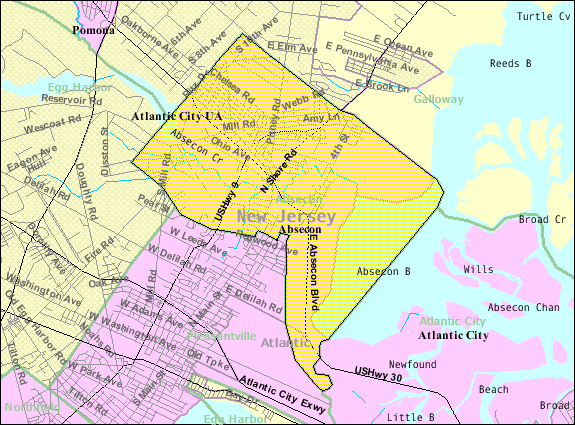
- Census Bureau map of Absecon, New Jersey

- Location in Atlantic County Location in New Jersey Location in the United States
- Coordinates: 39.423563°N 74.493025°W
- Country: United States
- State: New Jersey
- County: Atlantic
- Incorporated: February 29, 1872 (as town)
- Reincorporated: March 24, 1902 (as city)
- Named for: Absegami Native Americans

Government
  - Type: City
  - Body: City Council
  - Mayor: Thomas Marrone (R, term ends December 31, 2028)
  - Administrator: Vacant
  - Municipal clerk: Carie A. Crone

Area
  - Total: 7.22 sq mi (18.69 km^{2})
  - Land: 5.53 sq mi (14.33 km^{2})
  - Water: 1.68 sq mi (4.36 km^{2}) 24.22%
  - Rank: 241st of 565 in state 17th of 23 in county
- Elevation: 3 ft (0.91 m)

Population (2020)
  - Total: 9,137
  - Estimate (2023): 9,130
  - Rank: 260th of 565 in state 9th of 23 in county
  - Density: 1,671/sq mi (645/km^{2})
  - Rank: 322nd of 565 in state 9th of 23 in county
- Time zone: UTC−05:00 (Eastern (EST))
  - Summer (DST): UTC−04:00 (Eastern (EDT))
- ZIP Codes: 08201, 08205
- Area codes: 609 exchanges: 404, 652, 748
- FIPS code: 3400100100
- GNIS feature ID: 0885134
- Website: www.abseconnj.gov

Absecon (/æbˈsiːkɪn/, ab-SEE-kin) is a city in Atlantic County, in the U.S. state of New Jersey. As of the 2020 United States census, the city's population was 9,137, its highest decennial count ever and an increase of 726 (+8.6%) from the 2010 census count of 8,411, which in turn reflected an increase of 773 (+10.1%) from the 7,638 counted in the 2000 census.

== History ==
The current City of Absecon was originally incorporated as a town by an act of the New Jersey Legislature on February 29, 1872, from portions of Egg Harbor Township and Galloway Township. Then on March 24, 1902, the City of Absecon replaced the town. The city is named for the Absegami tribe of Native Americans, from the word "Absogami", which means "little stream".

== Geography ==
According to the United States Census Bureau, Absecon city had a total area of 7.22 square miles (18.69 km^{2}), including 5.47 square miles (14.16 km^{2}) of land and 1.75 square miles (4.53 km^{2}) of water (24.22%).

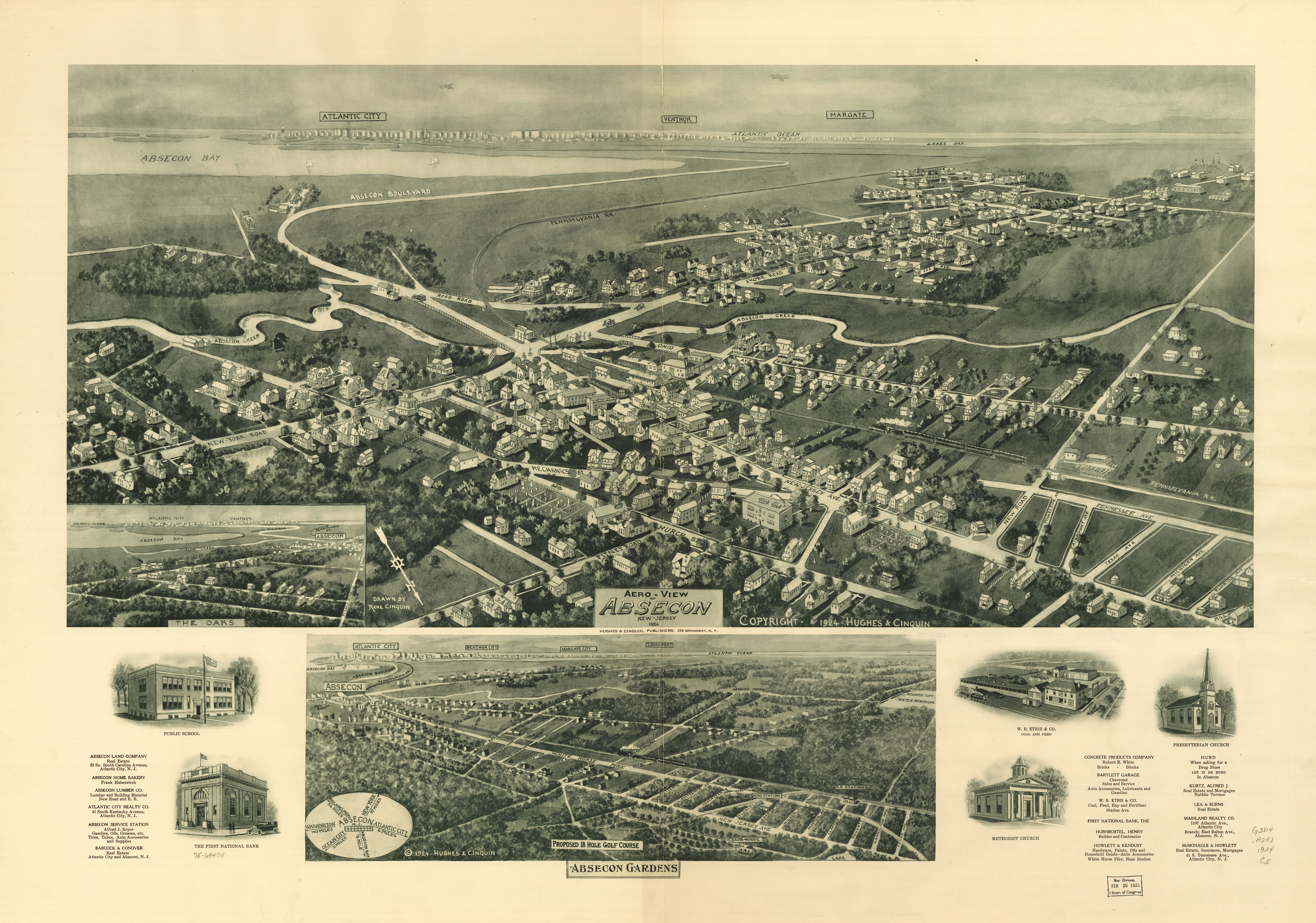
Panoramic map of Absecon with list of landmarks and inset images of several as well as Absecon Gardens neighborhood

The city borders the Atlantic County municipalities of Atlantic City, Egg Harbor Township, Galloway Township and Pleasantville.

=== Climate ===
The climate in Absecon is subtropical, as the summers are hot and humid, and the winters are mild. The coldest month is January, and the hottest month is July.

Climate data for Absecon, New Jersey
Month	Jan	Feb	Mar	Apr	May	Jun	Jul	Aug	Sep	Oct	Nov	Dec	Year
Mean daily maximum °F (°C)	43.4 (6.3)	43.7 (6.5)	50.6 (10.3)	59.9 (15.5)	69.9 (21.1)	78.9 (26.1)	83.8 (28.8)	82.5 (28.1)	77.1 (25.1)	67.3 (19.6)	56.5 (13.6)	45.7 (7.6)	63.3 (17.4)
Mean daily minimum °F (°C)	23.6 (−4.7)	23.8 (−4.6)	30.4 (−0.9)	39.4 (4.1)	49.2 (9.6)	58.9 (14.9)	64.0 (17.8)	62.3 (16.8)	55.7 (13.2)	44.6 (7.0)	34.3 (1.3)	25.5 (−3.6)	42.6 (5.9)
Average precipitation inches (mm)	3.4 (86)	3.1 (79)	3.7 (94)	3.5 (89)	3.3 (84)	3.3 (84)	3.8 (97)	5.1 (130)	3.2 (81)	8.9 (230)	3.5 (89)	3.8 (97)	43.0 (1,090)
Source: Weatherbase Updated On February 18, 2020

== Demographics ==
Historical population
Census	Pop.	Note	%±
1880	507		—
1890	501		−1.2%
1900	530		5.8%
1910	781		47.4%
1920	702		−10.1%
1930	2,158		207.4%
1940	2,084		−3.4%
1950	2,355		13.0%
1960	4,320		83.4%
1970	6,094		41.1%
1980	6,859		12.6%
1990	7,298		6.4%
2000	7,638		4.7%
2010	8,411		10.1%
2020	9,137		8.6%
2023 (est.)	9,130		−0.1%
Population sources: 1880–2000; 1880–1920 1880–1890; 1890–1910 1910–1930; 1940–2000 2000; 2010 2020

The city, and all of Atlantic County, is part of the Atlantic City-Hammonton metropolitan statistical area, which in turn is included in the Philadelphia metropolitan area.

=== 2020 census ===
As of the 2020 census, Absecon had a population of 9,137. The median age was 45.4 years. 18.7% of residents were under the age of 18 and 21.8% of residents were 65 years of age or older. For every 100 females there were 93.0 males, and for every 100 females age 18 and over there were 90.4 males age 18 and over.

97.3% of residents lived in urban areas, while 2.7% lived in rural areas.

There were 3,614 households in Absecon, of which 26.0% had children under the age of 18 living in them. Of all households, 46.2% were married-couple households, 18.0% were households with a male householder and no spouse or partner present, and 28.4% were households with a female householder and no spouse or partner present. About 27.6% of all households were made up of individuals and 12.3% had someone living alone who was 65 years of age or older.

There were 3,888 housing units, of which 7.0% were vacant. The homeowner vacancy rate was 1.1% and the rental vacancy rate was 11.6%.

Racial composition as of the 2020 census
Race	Number	Percent
White	6,083	66.6%
Black or African American	1,114	12.2%
American Indian and Alaska Native	50	0.5%
Asian	701	7.7%
Native Hawaiian and Other Pacific Islander	4	0.0%
Some other race	507	5.5%
Two or more races	678	7.4%
Hispanic or Latino (of any race)	1,086	11.9%

=== 2010 census ===
The 2010 United States census counted 8,411 people, 3,179 households, and 2,254 families in the city. The population density was 1,558.8 per square mile (601.9/km^{2}). There were 3,365 housing units at an average density of 623.6 per square mile (240.8/km^{2}). The racial makeup was 76.45% (6,430) White, 9.89% (832) Black or African American, 0.38% (32) Native American, 7.93% (667) Asian, 0.00% (0) Pacific Islander, 2.94% (247) from other races, and 2.41% (203) from two or more races. Hispanic or Latino of any race were 7.50% (631) of the population.

Of the 3,179 households, 27.2% had children under the age of 18; 53.3% were married couples living together; 13.0% had a female householder with no husband present and 29.1% were non-families. Of all households, 22.8% were made up of individuals and 9.8% had someone living alone who was 65 years of age or older. The average household size was 2.60 and the average family size was 3.07.

20.8% of the population were under the age of 18, 7.2% from 18 to 24, 23.2% from 25 to 44, 31.8% from 45 to 64, and 17.0% who were 65 years of age or older. The median age was 44.1 years. For every 100 females, the population had 92.3 males. For every 100 females ages 18 and older there were 89.0 males.

The Census Bureau's 2006–2010 American Community Survey showed that (in 2010 inflation-adjusted dollars) median household income was $64,370 (with a margin of error of +/− $5,398) and the median family income was $77,784 (+/− $9,673). Males had a median income of $47,043 (+/− $7,593) versus $43,673 (+/− $3,797) for females. The per capita income for the borough was $31,194 (+/− $4,373). About 5.2% of families and 8.9% of the population were below the poverty line, including 10.4% of those under age 18 and 16.0% of those age 65 or over.

=== 2000 census ===
As of the 2000 United States census there were 7,638 people, 2,773 households, and 2,085 families residing in the city. The population density was 1,336.0 inhabitants per square mile (515.8/km^{2}). There were 2,902 housing units at an average density of 507.6 per square mile (196.0/km^{2}). The racial makeup of the city was 83.31% White, 6.01% African American, 0.17% Native American, 7.46% Asian, 1.51% from other races, and 1.54% from two or more races. Hispanic or Latino of any race were 3.77% of the population.

There were 2,773 households, out of which 32.5% had children under the age of 18 living with them, 59.6% were married couples living together, 11.2% had a female householder with no husband present, and 24.8% were non-families. 19.2% of all households were made up of individuals, and 7.9% had someone living alone who was 65 years of age or older. The average household size was 2.69 and the average family size was 3.08.

In the city, the population was spread out, with 23.5% under the age of 18, 5.7% from 18 to 24, 29.6% from 25 to 44, 25.1% from 45 to 64, and 16.1% who were 65 years of age or older. The median age was 40 years. For every 100 females, there were 92.0 males. For every 100 females age 18 and over, there were 88.4 males.

The median income for a household in the city was $55,745, and the median income for a family was $61,563. Males had a median income of $47,984 versus $31,663 for females. The per capita income for the city was $23,615. About 3.2% of families and 4.8% of the population were below the poverty line, including 5.9% of those under age 18 and 4.3% of those age 65 or over.

== Government ==
=== Local government ===
Absecon operates under the City form of New Jersey municipal government. The city is one of 15 municipalities (of the 564) statewide that use this traditional form of government. The governing body is comprised of the Mayor and the seven-member City Council. The mayor is elected to a four-year term of office. The City Council includes six members elected from the city's two wards to three-year terms on a staggered basis, with one seat from each ward up for election each year, along with one member elected at-large to a four-year term in office, all of whom are elected on a partisan basis as part of the November general election.

As of 2026, the Mayor of Absecon is Republican Thomas A. Marrone, serving a term of office ending December 31, 2028. Members of the Absecon City Council are Council President Richard DeRose (R, 2028; Ward 2), Alexander C. Clark IV (R, 2026; Ward 1), Linda Evans (R, 2027; Ward 2), Nicholas L. LaRotonda (R, 2027; Ward 1), Stephen S. Light (R, 2029; At Large), Christine Parker (R, 2026; Ward 2), and Michael Sykes (R, 2028; Ward 1).

In September 2021, the City Council selected Donna Poley to fill the Ward 1 seat expiring in December 2022 that had been held by Keith C. Bennett until he resigned from office.

In February 2019, the City Council appointed Ward 2 councilmember Kimberley Horton to fill the mayoral seat expiring in December 2020 that had been held by John Armstrong until he resigned from office. Horton served on an interim basis until the November 2019 general election when he was elected to serve the balance of the term of office. Later that month, Caleb Cavileer was chosen to fill Horton's vacant Ward 2 seat expiring in December 2020. In the November 2019 general election, Cavileer ran for and won a full three-year term and Butch Burroughs was elected to serve the balance of Horton's council term of office, while Horton was elected to complete the mayoral term.

Following the death of Ward 1 Councilmember Donald E. Camp in February 2016, Patrick Sheeran was selected from three candidates nominated by the Republican municipal committee and appointed to fill the vacant seat expiring in December 2016.

=== Federal, state and county representation ===
Absecon is located in the 2nd Congressional district and is part of New Jersey's 2nd state legislative district.

For the 119th United States Congress, New Jersey's 2nd congressional district is represented by Jeff Van Drew (R, Dennis Township). New Jersey is represented in the United States Senate by Democrats Cory Booker (Newark, term ends 2027) and Andy Kim (Moorestown, term ends 2031).

For the 2026–2027 session, the 2nd legislative district of the New Jersey Legislature is represented in the New Jersey Senate by Vincent J. Polistina (R, Egg Harbor Township) and in the General Assembly by Don Guardian (R, Atlantic City) and Maureen Rowan (D, Atlantic City).

Atlantic County is governed by a directly elected county executive and a nine-member Board of County Commissioners, responsible for legislation. The executive serves a four-year term and the commissioners are elected to staggered three-year terms, of which four are elected from the county on an at-large basis and five of the commissioners represent equally populated districts. As of 2025, Atlantic County's Executive is Dennis Levinson (R, Northfield), whose term of office ends December 31, 2027. Members of the Board of County Commissioners are:

Ernest D. Coursey (D, District 1-- Atlantic City, Egg Harbor Township (part), Longport, Margate City, and Ventnor City; 2025, Atlantic City), Chair Maureen Kern (R, District 2-- Egg Harbor Township (part), Linwood, Northfield, Somers Point and Pleasantville; 2027, Somers Point), Andrew Parker III (R, District 3-- Egg Harbor Township (part) and Hamilton Township (part); 2026, Egg Harbor Township), Richard R. Dase (R, District 4, including Brigantine, Galloway Township, Egg Harbor Township (part), and Port Republic; 2025, Galloway Township), Vice Chair James A. Bertino (R, District 5-- Buena, Buena Vista Township, Corbin City, Egg Harbor City, Estell Manor, Folsom, Hamilton Township (part), Hammonton, Mullica Township and Weymouth Township; 2027, Hammonton), June Byrnes (R, At-Large; 2026, Linwood), Michael Ruffu (R, At-Large; Margate, 2027) Amy L. Gatto (R, At-large; 2025, Hamilton Township) and John W. Risley (R, At-Large; 2026, Egg Harbor Township)

Atlantic County's constitutional officers are: Clerk Joesph J. Giralo (R, 2026, Hammonton), Sheriff Joe O'Donoghue (R, 2026, Egg Harbor Township) and Surrogate James Curcio (R, 2025, Hammonton).

=== Politics ===
As of March 2011, there were a total of 5,629 registered voters in Absecon City, of which 1,353 (24.0% vs. 30.5% countywide) were registered as Democrats, 1,716 (30.5% vs. 25.2%) were registered as Republicans and 2,557 (45.4% vs. 44.3%) were registered as Unaffiliated. There were 3 voters registered as Libertarians or Greens. Among the city's 2010 Census population, 66.9% (vs. 58.8% in Atlantic County) were registered to vote, including 84.5% of those ages 18 and over (vs. 76.6% countywide).

Gubernatorial election results for Absecon
Year	Republican		Democratic		Third party(ies)	
Year	No.	%	No.	%	No.	%
2025	1,961	49.92%	1,942	49.44%	25	0.64%
2021	1,856	57.62%	1,340	41.60%	25	0.78%
2017	1,150	47.98%	1,191	49.69%	56	2.34%
2013	1,874	67.17%	883	31.65%	33	1.18%
2009	1,501	52.67%	1,195	41.93%	154	5.40%
2005	1,247	49.04%	1,220	47.97%	76	2.99%

In the 2012 presidential election, Democrat Barack Obama received 2,172 votes (50.6% vs. 57.9% countywide), ahead of Republican Mitt Romney with 2,063 votes (48.1% vs. 41.1%) and other candidates with 43 votes (1.0% vs. 0.9%), among the 4,289 ballots cast by the city's 5,938 registered voters, for a turnout of 72.2% (vs. 65.8% in Atlantic County). In the 2008 presidential election, Republican John McCain received 2,262 votes (49.8% vs. 41.6% countywide), ahead of Democrat Barack Obama with 2,203 votes (48.5% vs. 56.5%) and other candidates with 41 votes (0.9% vs. 1.1%), among the 4,539 ballots cast by the city's 5,993 registered voters, for a turnout of 75.7% (vs. 68.1% in Atlantic County). In the 2004 presidential election, Republican George W. Bush received 2,177 votes (53.6% vs. 46.2% countywide), ahead of Democrat John Kerry with 1,800 votes (44.4% vs. 52.0%) and other candidates with 42 votes (1.0% vs. 0.8%), among the 4,058 ballots cast by the city's 5,201 registered voters, for a turnout of 78.0% (vs. 69.8% in the whole county).

Presidential elections results
Year	Republican	Democratic	Third Parties
2024	53.9% 2,753	44.0% 2,248	2.1% 90
2020	50.1% 2,675	48.6% 2,596	1.3% 71
2016	51.7% 2,341	44.5% 2,017	3.8% 172
2012	48.1% 2,063	50.6% 2,172	1.0% 43
2008	49.8% 2,262	48.5% 2,203	0.9% 41
2004	53.6% 2,177	44.4% 1,800	1.0% 42

In the 2013 gubernatorial election, Republican Chris Christie received 1,874 votes (65.0% vs. 60.0% countywide), ahead of Democrat Barbara Buono with 883 votes (30.6% vs. 34.9%) and other candidates with 33 votes (1.1% vs. 1.3%), among the 2,883 ballots cast by the city's 5,991 registered voters, yielding a 48.1% turnout (vs. 41.5% in the county). In the 2009 gubernatorial election, Republican Chris Christie received 1,501 votes (52.3% vs. 47.7% countywide), ahead of Democrat Jon Corzine with 1,195 votes (41.6% vs. 44.5%), Independent Chris Daggett with 133 votes (4.6% vs. 4.8%) and other candidates with 21 votes (0.7% vs. 1.2%), among the 2,872 ballots cast by the city's 5,770 registered voters, yielding a 49.8% turnout (vs. 44.9% in the county).

United States Senate election results for Absecon1
Year	Republican		Democratic		Third party(ies)	
Year	No.	%	No.	%	No.	%
2024	2,575	52.54%	2,247	45.85%	79	1.61%
2018	1,738	54.03%	1,346	41.84%	133	4.13%
2012	1,921	47.23%	2,086	51.29%	60	1.48%
2006	1,438	53.40%	1,199	44.52%	56	2.08%

United States Senate election results for Absecon2
Year	Republican		Democratic		Third party(ies)	
Year	No.	%	No.	%	No.	%
2020	2,566	49.22%	2,575	49.40%	72	1.38%
2014	1,327	51.88%	1,187	46.40%	44	1.72%
2013	881	56.22%	672	42.88%	14	0.89%
2008	2,028	47.99%	2,162	51.16%	36	0.85%

== Education ==
The Absecon Public School District serve students in pre-kindergarten through eighth grade. As of the 2024–25 school year, the district, comprised of two schools, had an enrollment of 921 students and 97.5 classroom teachers (on an FTE basis), for a student–teacher ratio of 9.5:1. Schools in the district (with 2024–25 enrollment data from the National Center for Education Statistics.) are H. Ashton Marsh Elementary School with 516 students in grades PreK–4 and Emma C. Attales Middle School with 392 students in grades 5–8.

For ninth through twelfth grades, public school students from Absecon attend the Pleasantville High School in Pleasantville as part of a sending/receiving relationship with the Pleasantville Public Schools. As of the 2024–25 school year, the high school had an enrollment of 997 students and 74.0 classroom teachers (on an FTE basis), for a student–teacher ratio of 13.5:1.

City public school students are also eligible to attend the Atlantic County Institute of Technology in the Mays Landing section of Hamilton Township or the Charter-Tech High School for the Performing Arts, located in Somers Point.

Holy Spirit High School is a Roman Catholic high school, that operates under the jurisdiction of the Diocese of Camden. Established in Atlantic City in 1922, the school moved to Absecon in 1964.

== Transportation ==
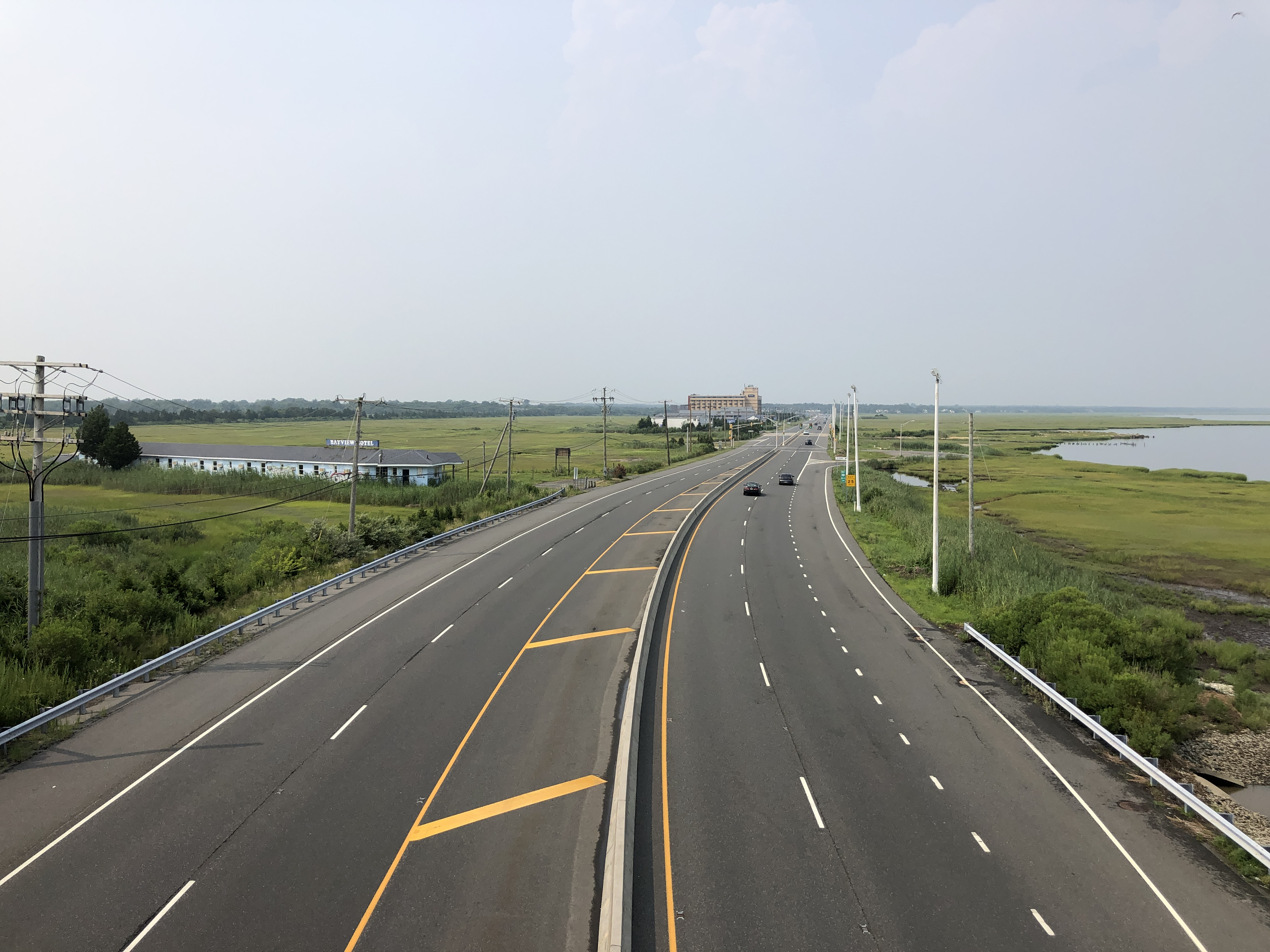
U.S. Route 30 westbound entering Absecon

=== Roads and highways ===
As of May 2010, the city had a total of 49.71 miles (80.00 km) of roadways, of which 35.12 miles (56.52 km) were maintained by the municipality, 7.54 miles (12.13 km) by Atlantic County and 7.05 miles (11.35 km) by the New Jersey Department of Transportation.

Highways and roads in Absecon include U.S. Route 9, U.S. Route 30, Route 157 and County Route 585. The now-defunct Route 43 also passed through the city.

The Atlantic City Expressway and the Garden State Parkway are accessible outside the city in bordering Egg Harbor and Galloway townships.

=== Public transportation ===
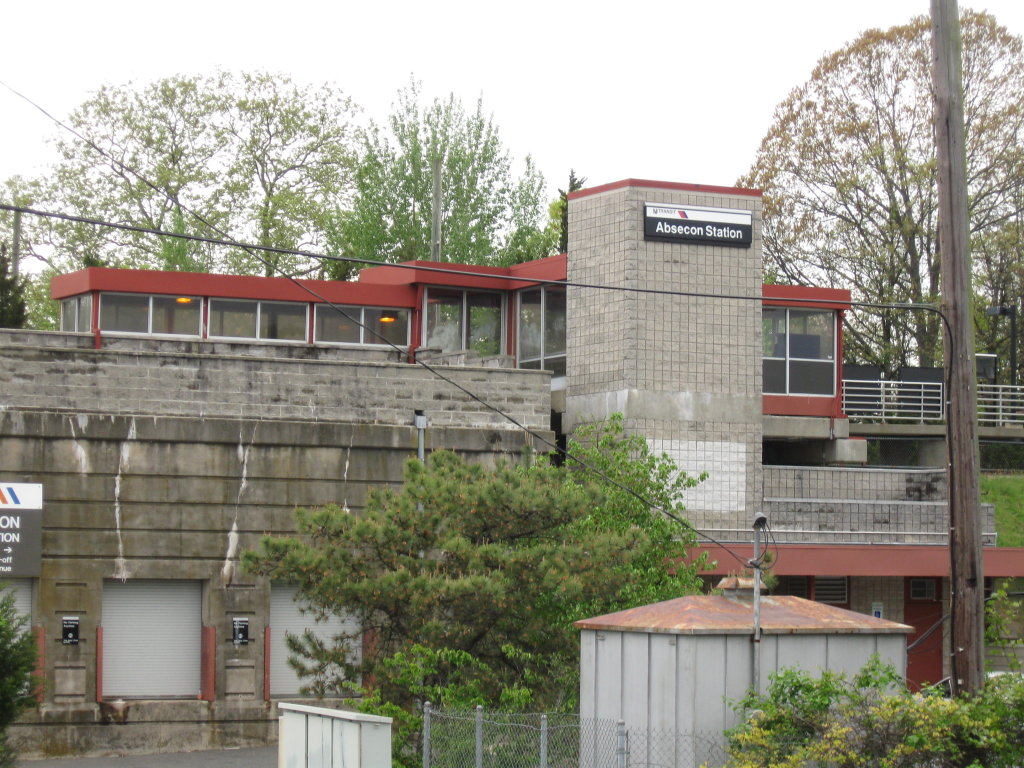
Absecon station, which is served by NJ Transit's Atlantic City Line

The Absecon station is served by NJ Transit's Atlantic City Line trains, with east-west service between 30th Street Station in Philadelphia and the Atlantic City Rail Terminal in Atlantic City.

NJ Transit provides bus service to and from Atlantic City on routes 508 (to the Hamilton Mall), 554 (to the Lindenwold PATCO station) and 559 (to Lakewood Township).

== Notable people ==
People who were born in, residents of, or otherwise closely associated with Absecon include:

- Valerie H. Armstrong, retired judge of the New Jersey Superior Court
- Francis J. Blee (born 1958), member of the General Assembly who represented the 2nd Legislative District and served on the Absecon City Council from 1991 to 1995, serving as Absecon's youngest ever council president from 1992 to 1993
- Joe Callahan (born 1993), American football quarterback who played in the NFL for the Green Bay Packers
- Robert Irvine (born 1965), celebrity chef and television personality
- Brian Joo (born 1981), R&B and K-pop recording artist who was part of the duo Fly to the Sky
- Amy Kennedy (born 1978), educator, mental health advocate and Democratic nominee for New Jersey's 2nd congressional district in the 2020 elections
- Michelle Malkin (born 1970), columnist and political commentator
- Joseph McGahn (1917–1999), member of the New Jersey Senate who was a leading advocate of bringing casino gambling to Atlantic City
- Carol Plum-Ucci (born 1957), young adult novelist and essayist
- John Roman (born 1952), former professional American football offensive lineman who played seven seasons in the NFL for the New York Jets
- Cleon Throckmorton (1897–1965), painter and theatrical designer, producer and architect
- Hilary Tompkins, lawyer who served as the solicitor of the U.S. Department of the Interior
