= Egg Harbor City, New Jersey =

City in Atlantic County, New Jersey, US

- City
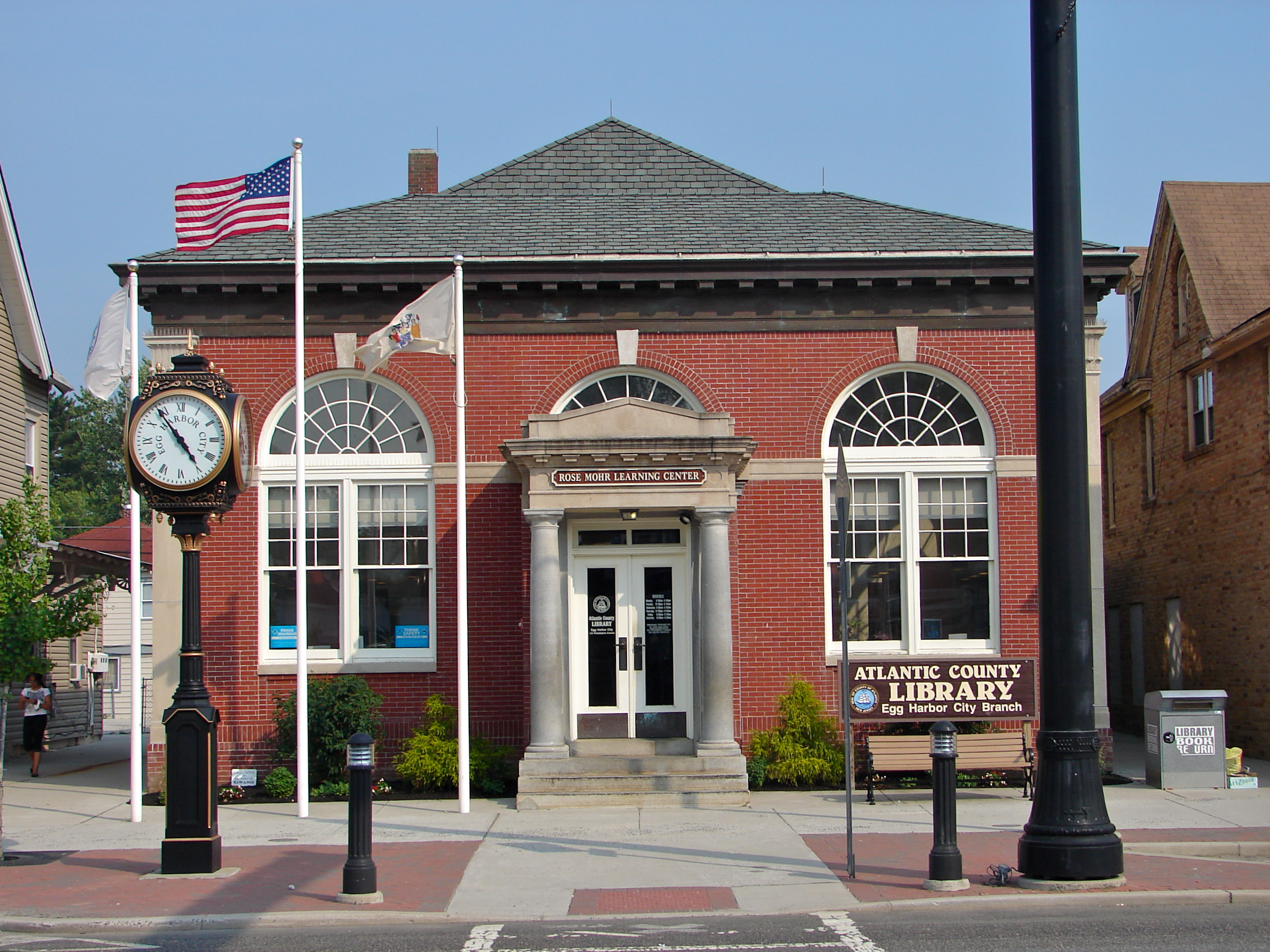
- Former Egg Harbor Commercial Bank building, now the local branch of the Atlantic County library system

- Seal

- Location of Egg Harbor City in Atlantic County highlighted in red (left). Inset map: Location of Atlantic County in New Jersey highlighted in orange (right).

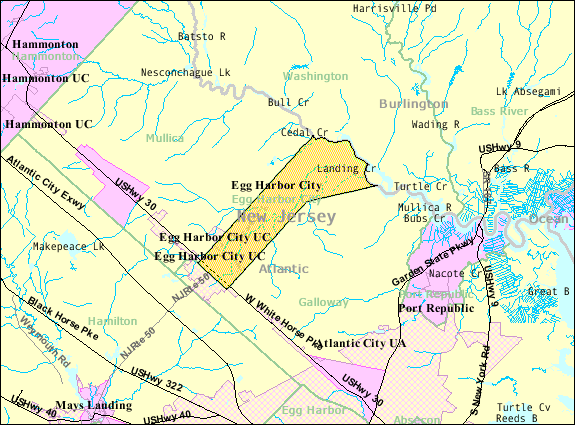
- Census Bureau map of Egg Harbor City, New Jersey

- Location in Atlantic County Location in New Jersey Location in the United States
- Coordinates: 39.563687°N 74.595865°W
- Country: United States
- State: New Jersey
- County: Atlantic
- Incorporated: June 14, 1858
- Named after: Gull eggs

Government
  - Type: Faulkner Act (small municipality)
  - Body: City Council
  - Mayor: Lisa Jiampetti (D, term ends December 31, 2028)
  - Municipal clerk: Meg Steeb

Area
  - Total: 11.42 sq mi (29.58 km^{2})
  - Land: 10.85 sq mi (28.10 km^{2})
  - Water: 0.57 sq mi (1.48 km^{2}) 4.99%
  - Rank: 198th of 565 in state 10th of 23 in county
- Elevation: 13 ft (4.0 m)

Population (2020)
  - Total: 4,396
  - Estimate (2023): 4,385
  - Rank: 400th of 565 in state 17th of 23 in county
  - Density: 405.1/sq mi (156.4/km^{2})
  - Rank: 459th of 565 in state 14th of 23 in county
- Time zone: UTC−05:00 (Eastern (EST))
  - Summer (DST): UTC−04:00 (Eastern (EDT))
- ZIP Code: 08215
- Area code: 609 exchanges: 704, 726, 804, 965
- FIPS code: 3400120350
- GNIS feature ID: 0876119
- Website: www.eggharborcity.org

Egg Harbor City is a city in Atlantic County, in the U.S. state of New Jersey. The city, and all of Atlantic County, is part of the Atlantic City-Hammonton metropolitan statistical area, which in turn is included in the Philadelphia metropolitan area. As of the 2020 United States census, the city's population was 4,396, an increase of 153 (+3.6%) from the 2010 census count of 4,243, which in turn reflected a decline of 302 (−6.6%) from the 4,545 counted in the 2000 census.

The city had the seventh-highest property tax rate in New Jersey, with an equalized rate of 5.044% in 2020, compared to 2.560% in the county as a whole and a statewide average of 2.279%.

== History ==
The area home to Egg Harbor City was settled by Europeans in 1614, when the Dutch vessel Fortuyn landed at the Mullica River. The first settlers named the area "Eyren Haven" after the large number of gull eggs in the area.

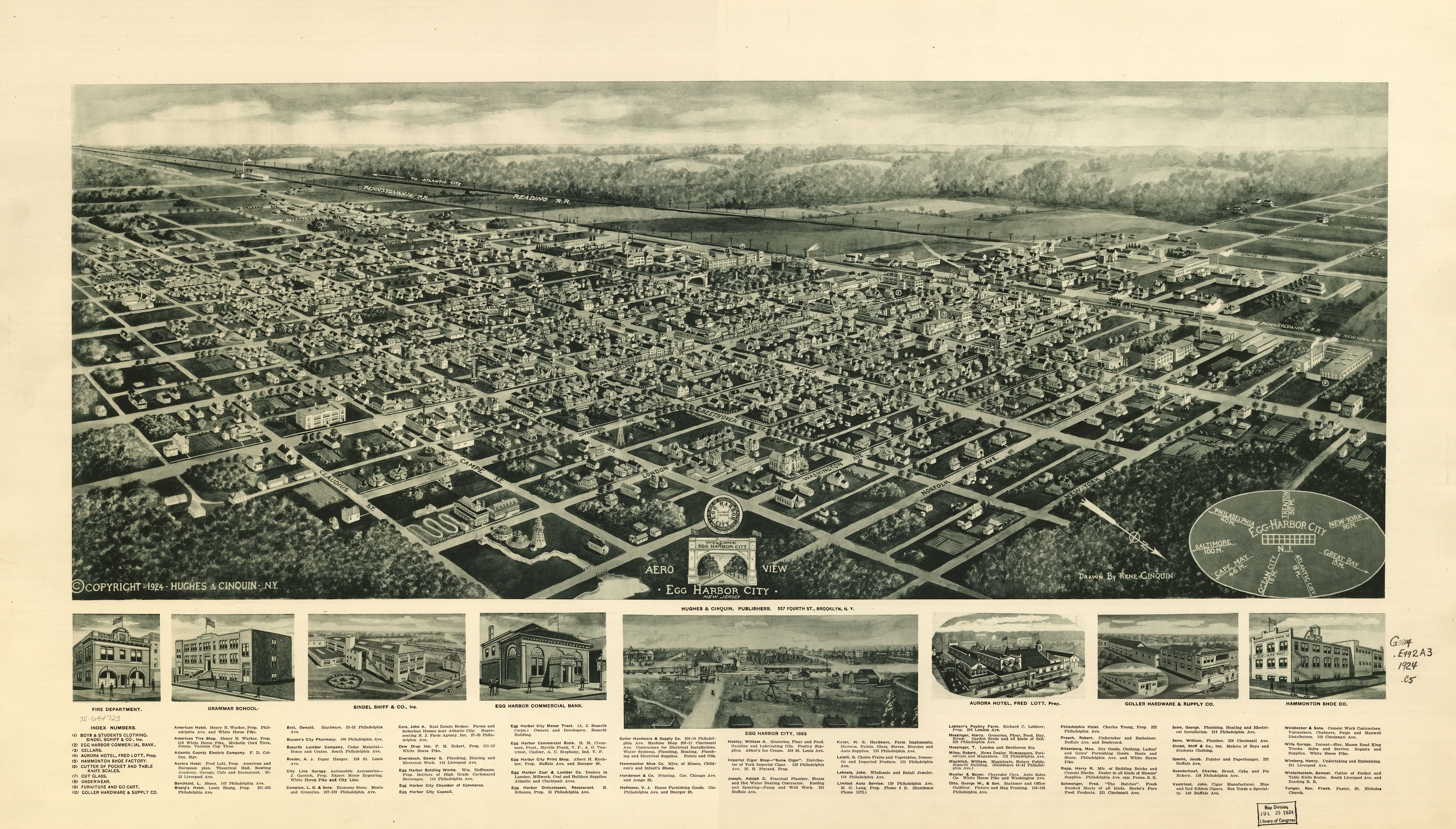
Panoramic map of Egg Harbor City from 1924 with list of landmarks, inset images of several, and a depiction of the area in 1855

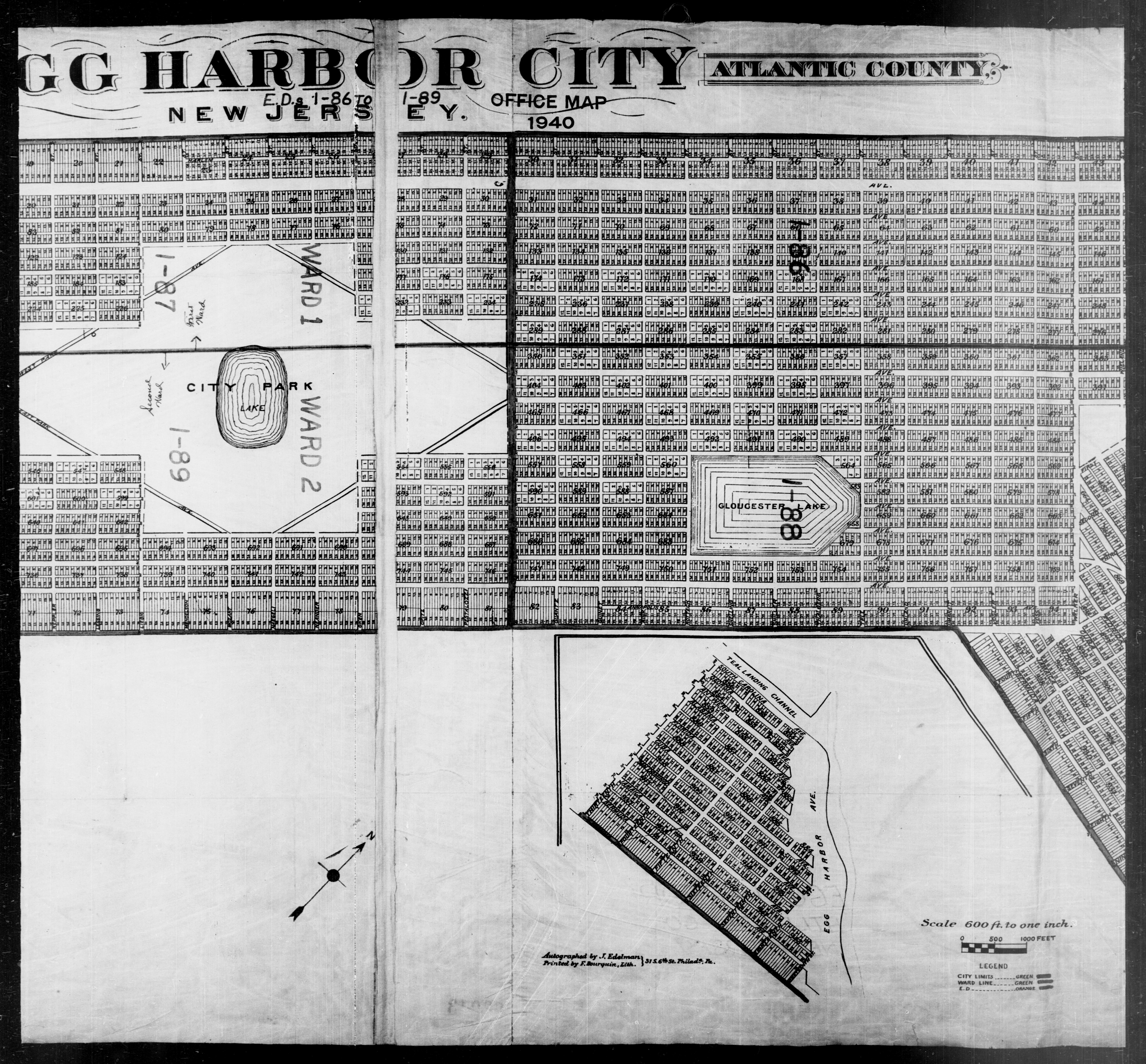
1940 Census map of Egg Harbor City land plots, showing unbuilt streets and parks

In 1854, the Camden and Atlantic Railroad opened. On December 14, 1854, a group of prominent German Americans from Philadelphia, including William and Henry Schmoele and Philip Mathias Wolsieffer, incorporated the "Gloucester Farm and Town Association", which purchased approximately 38,000 acres of woodland north of the railroad to serve as a refuge for those being persecuted in the anti-immigrant violence known as the Know-Nothing movement. The corporation planned two cities: a four-square-mile city called "Pomona" closest to the railroad, and another city called "Gloucester" to the north. However, the twin city scheme was dropped in favor of one seven-mile-long metropolis called "Egg Harbor City". The development's layout contained an urban "city core" containing 100x150-foot lots bounded by New York Avenue to the west and Baltimore Avenue to the east, while the remainder of the land was divided into separate 20-acre farm parcels. The corporation issued stocks at $300 per share; with each share, stockholders would acquire one residential building lot and one farm parcel. The city was marketed heavily in cities containing large German American populations, including Baltimore, Buffalo, Cleveland, Milwaukee, and St. Louis.

The land was divided and plotted from the railroad north to the Mullica River, west ending at Hanover Avenue, and the easternmost land being the home of the present-day Stockton University. The north–south streets were avenues named for cities with large German populations, while the east–west streets were named for notable Germans, starting with Agassiz Street (current-day White Horse Pike) to the south, and ending with Zschokke Street (unbuilt) to the north. The city was planned to include ample public green space; both New York Avenue and Baltimore Avenue were platted with wide medians to accommodate garden plats, Landing Creek would have been dammed to create an artificial lake called "Gloucester Lake", and Egg Harbor City Lake would have been made into a reservoir at the center of a large urban park containing landscaped gardens, an arboretum, and a model farm. The Mullica River was proposed to be made navigable for commercial vessels, and the northern edge of the street grid along the river was to contain canals and wharfs for ships to dock.

Egg Harbor City was officially incorporated as a city by an Act of the New Jersey Legislature on June 14, 1858, from portions of Galloway Township and Mullica Township. The city was reincorporated on February 13, 1868. The city's growth was slowed due to th Panic of 1857, and then further during the Civil War. Though the city did not grow to the size as originally proposed, it grew in population steadily in the 1870s, and remained a virtual island of German language and culture in South Jersey for more than 50 years.

== Geography ==
According to the United States Census Bureau, the city had a total area of 11.42 square miles (29.58 km^{2}), including 10.85 square miles (28.10 km^{2}) of land and 0.57 square miles (1.48 km^{2}) of water (4.99%).

Unincorporated communities, localities and place names located partially or completely within the township include Clarks Landing, Gloucester Furnace and Gloucester Lake.

The city borders the municipalities of Galloway Township and Mullica Township in Atlantic County; and Washington Township in Burlington County.

The city is one of 56 South Jersey municipalities that are included within the New Jersey Pinelands National Reserve, a protected natural area of unique ecology covering 1,100,000 acres (450,000 ha), that has been classified as a United States Biosphere Reserve and established by Congress in 1978 as the nation's first National Reserve. All of the city is included in the state-designated Pinelands Area, which includes portions of Atlantic County, along with areas in Burlington, Camden, Cape May, Cumberland, Gloucester and Ocean counties.

== Demographics ==
Historical population
Census	Pop.	Note	%±
1860	789		—
1870	1,311		66.2%
1880	1,232		−6.0%
1890	1,439		16.8%
1900	1,808		25.6%
1910	2,181		20.6%
1920	2,622		20.2%
1930	3,478		32.6%
1940	3,589		3.2%
1950	3,838		6.9%
1960	4,416		15.1%
1970	4,304		−2.5%
1980	4,618		7.3%
1990	4,583		−0.8%
2000	4,545		−0.8%
2010	4,243		−6.6%
2020	4,396		3.6%
2023 (est.)	4,385		−0.3%
Population sources: 1860–2000 1860–1920; 1860–1870 1870; 1880–1890 1890–1910; 1910–1930 1940–2000; 2000 2010 2020

=== 2020 census ===
As of the 2020 census, Egg Harbor City had a population of 4,396. The median age was 38.7 years. 23.4% of residents were under the age of 18 and 15.8% of residents were 65 years of age or older. For every 100 females there were 95.6 males, and for every 100 females age 18 and older there were 91.5 males age 18 and older.

89.0% of residents lived in urban areas, while 11.0% lived in rural areas.

There were 1,712 households in Egg Harbor City, of which 32.2% had children under the age of 18 living in them. Of all households, 33.6% were married-couple households, 20.2% were households with a male householder and no spouse or partner present, and 36.8% were households with a female householder and no spouse or partner present. About 29.7% of all households were made up of individuals and 15.0% had someone living alone who was 65 years of age or older.

There were 1,896 housing units, of which 9.7% were vacant. The homeowner vacancy rate was 5.0% and the rental vacancy rate was 7.7%.

Racial composition as of the 2020 census
Race	Number	Percent
White	2,172	49.4%
Black or African American	974	22.2%
American Indian and Alaska Native	23	0.5%
Asian	117	2.7%
Native Hawaiian and Other Pacific Islander	1	0.0%
Some other race	606	13.8%
Two or more races	503	11.4%
Hispanic or Latino (of any race)	1,223	27.8%

=== 2010 census ===
The 2010 United States census counted 4,243 people, 1,593 households, and 1,075 families in the city. The population density was 388.1 per square mile (149.8/km^{2}). There were 1,736 housing units at an average density of 158.8 per square mile (61.3/km^{2}). The racial makeup was 62.95% (2,671) White, 17.94% (761) Black or African American, 0.38% (16) Native American, 2.22% (94) Asian, 0.09% (4) Pacific Islander, 12.28% (521) from other races, and 4.15% (176) from two or more races. Hispanic or Latino of any race were 26.28% (1,115) of the population.

Of the 1,593 households, 30.2% had children under the age of 18; 39.0% were married couples living together; 21.3% had a female householder with no husband present and 32.5% were non-families. Of all households, 25.3% were made up of individuals and 8.5% had someone living alone who was 65 years of age or older. The average household size was 2.64 and the average family size was 3.13.

24.9% of the population were under the age of 18, 10.5% from 18 to 24, 25.9% from 25 to 44, 26.9% from 45 to 64, and 11.8% who were 65 years of age or older. The median age was 36.4 years. For every 100 females, the population had 96.9 males. For every 100 females ages 18 and older there were 93.9 males.

The Census Bureau's 2006–2010 American Community Survey showed that (in 2010 inflation-adjusted dollars) median household income was $52,893 (with a margin of error of +/− $8,582) and the median family income was $67,654 (+/− $6,555). Males had a median income of $35,182 (+/− $7,553) versus $33,994 (+/− $2,214) for females. The per capita income for the borough was $22,294 (+/− $3,702). About 11.3% of families and 20.9% of the population were below the poverty line, including 36.2% of those under age 18 and 12.7% of those age 65 or over.

=== 2000 census ===
As of the 2000 United States census there were 4,545 people, 1,658 households, and 1,150 families residing in the city. The population density was 409.2 inhabitants per square mile (158.0/km^{2}). There were 1,770 housing units at an average density of 159.4 per square mile (61.5/km^{2}). The racial makeup of the city was 66.80% White, 14.19% African American, 0.37% Native American, 1.25% Asian, 0.09% Pacific Islander, 13.49% from other races, and 3.81% from two or more races. Hispanic or Latino people of any race were 24.55% of the population.

There were 1,658 households, out of which 34.2% had children under the age of 18 living with them, 43.7% were married couples living together, 20.3% had a female householder with no husband present, and 30.6% were non-families. 24.9% of all households were made up of individuals, and 10.8% had someone living alone who was 65 years of age or older. The average household size was 2.70 and the average family size was 3.20.

In the city the population was spread out, with 28.3% under the age of 18, 8.5% from 18 to 24, 29.7% from 25 to 44, 19.6% from 45 to 64, and 13.9% who were 65 years of age or older. The median age was 35 years. For every 100 females, there were 93.6 males. For every 100 females age 18 and over, there were 88.9 males.

The median income for a household in the city was $32,956, and the median income for a family was $40,040. Males had a median income of $27,978 versus $23,560 for females. The per capita income for the city was $15,151. About 11.7% of families and 13.1% of the population were below the poverty line, including 13.5% of those under age 18 and 15.5% of those age 65 or over.

== Government ==
=== Local government ===
The City of Egg Harbor City is governed by the Faulkner Act (formally known as the Optional Municipal Charter Law) under the Small Municipality Plan, which is available to communities with fewer than 12,000 residents at the time of adoption. The city is one of 15 municipalities (of the 564) statewide that use this form of government. The governing body is comprised of the mayor and the City Council, with all elected at-large in partisan elections as part of the November general election. The mayor is elected to a four-year term of office. The City Council includes nine members, who are elected to three-year terms on a staggered basis in a three-year cycle, with three seats coming up for election each year.

The mayor is the statutory head of the Police department and the city's Chief Executive Officer. The City Council makes local laws, sets an agenda pertaining to the direction that the governments programs and approves budgets for various programs. The City Administrator takes the elected officials programs and sets policy and procedures in order to carry out the day-to-day operations of the municipality. The City Administrator also deals with federal, state, county and neighboring municipal officials to implement the community's needs.

As of 2026, the Mayor of Egg Harbor City is Democrat Lisa Jiampetti, whose four-year term of office ends on December 31, 2028. Members of the City Council are Council President Joseph A. Kuehner Jr. (D, 2027), Donna M. Heist (R, 2026), Rick Dovey (D, 2027), Tanner Ortiz (R, 2028), Nanette LoBiondo Galloway (D, 2028), Kim Hesse (D, 2027), Scott Senn (D, 2028), President Pro Tempore Karl Timbers (D, 2026) and Mason Wright Jr. (D, 2026).

=== Federal, state and county representation ===
Egg Harbor City is located in the 2nd Congressional District and is part of New Jersey's 8th state legislative district.

For the 119th United States Congress, New Jersey's 2nd congressional district is represented by Jeff Van Drew (R, Dennis Township). New Jersey is represented in the United States Senate by Democrats Cory Booker (Newark, term ends 2027) and Andy Kim (Moorestown, term ends 2031).

For the 2026–2027 session, the 8th legislative district of the New Jersey Legislature is represented in the New Jersey Senate by Latham Tiver (R, Southampton Township) and in the General Assembly by Anthony Angelozzi (D, Hammonton) and Andrea Katz (D, Chesterfield Township).

Atlantic County is governed by a directly elected county executive and a nine-member Board of County Commissioners, responsible for legislation. The executive serves a four-year term and the commissioners are elected to staggered three-year terms, of which four are elected from the county on an at-large basis and five of the commissioners represent equally populated districts. As of 2025, Atlantic County's Executive is Dennis Levinson (R, Northfield), whose term of office ends December 31, 2027. Members of the Board of County Commissioners are:

Ernest D. Coursey (D, District 1-- Atlantic City, Egg Harbor Township (part), Longport, Margate City, and Ventnor City; 2025, Atlantic City), Chair Maureen Kern (R, District 2-- Egg Harbor Township (part), Linwood, Northfield, Somers Point and Pleasantville; 2027, Somers Point), Andrew Parker III (R, District 3-- Egg Harbor Township (part) and Hamilton Township (part); 2026, Egg Harbor Township), Richard R. Dase (R, District 4, including Brigantine, Galloway Township, Egg Harbor Township (part), and Port Republic; 2025, Galloway Township), Vice Chair James A. Bertino (R, District 5-- Buena, Buena Vista Township, Corbin City, Egg Harbor City, Estell Manor, Folsom, Hamilton Township (part), Hammonton, Mullica Township and Weymouth Township; 2027, Hammonton), June Byrnes (R, At-Large; 2026, Linwood), Michael Ruffu (R, At-Large; Margate, 2027) Amy L. Gatto (R, At-large; 2025, Hamilton Township) and John W. Risley (R, At-Large; 2026, Egg Harbor Township)

Atlantic County's constitutional officers are: Clerk Joesph J. Giralo (R, 2026, Hammonton), Sheriff Joe O'Donoghue (R, 2026, Egg Harbor Township) and Surrogate James Curcio (R, 2025, Hammonton).

=== Politics ===
As of March 23, 2011, there were a total of 2,562 registered voters in Egg Harbor City, of which 851 (33.2% vs. 30.5% countywide) were registered as Democrats, 617 (24.1% vs. 25.2%) were registered as Republicans and 1,093 (42.7% vs. 44.3%) were registered as Unaffiliated. There was one voter registered to another party. Among the city's 2010 Census population, 60.4% (vs. 58.8% in Atlantic County) were registered to vote, including 80.4% of those ages 18 and over (vs. 76.6% countywide).

Gubernatorial election results for Egg Harbor City
Year	Republican		Democratic		Third party(ies)	
Year	No.	%	No.	%	No.	%
2025	593	42.91%	779	56.37%	10	0.72%
2021	588	52.93%	515	46.35%	8	0.72%
2017	339	39.60%	494	57.71%	23	2.69%
2013	659	62.17%	385	36.32%	16	1.51%
2009	520	44.03%	576	48.77%	85	7.20%
2005	382	40.04%	532	55.77%	40	4.19%

In the 2012 presidential election, Democrat Barack Obama received 1,121 votes here (61.0% vs. 57.9% countywide), ahead of Republican Mitt Romney with 674 votes (36.7% vs. 41.1%) and other candidates with 27 votes (1.5% vs. 0.9%), among the 1,838 ballots cast by the city's 2,724 registered voters, for a turnout of 67.5% (vs. 65.8% in Atlantic County). In the 2008 presidential election, Democrat Barack Obama received 1,166 votes here (60.0% vs. 56.5% countywide), ahead of Republican John McCain with 737 votes (38.0% vs. 41.6%) and other candidates with 21 votes (1.1% vs. 1.1%), among the 1,942 ballots cast by the city's 2,969 registered voters, for a turnout of 65.4% (vs. 68.1% in Atlantic County). In the 2004 presidential election, Democrat John Kerry received 975 votes here (54.0% vs. 52.0% countywide), ahead of Republican George W. Bush with 779 votes (43.1% vs. 46.2%) and other candidates with 21 votes (1.2% vs. 0.8%), among the 1,806 ballots cast by the city's 2,626 registered voters, for a turnout of 68.8% (vs. 69.8% in the whole county).

Presidential elections results
Year	Republican	Democratic	Third Parties
2024	47.1% 873	50.9% 944	2.0% 32
2020	42.2% 851	56.4% 1,138	1.4% 29
2016	42.0% 682	53.5% 867	4.5% 73
2012	36.7% 674	61.0% 1,121	1.5% 27
2008	38.0% 737	60.0% 1,166	1.1% 21
2004	43.1% 779	54.0% 975	1.2% 21

In the 2013 gubernatorial election, Republican Chris Christie received 659 votes here (59.3% vs. 60.0% countywide), ahead of Democrat Barbara Buono with 385 votes (34.7% vs. 34.9%) and other candidates with 16 votes (1.4% vs. 1.3%), among the 1,111 ballots cast by the city's 2,700 registered voters, yielding a 41.1% turnout (vs. 41.5% in the county). In the 2009 gubernatorial election, Democrat Jon Corzine received 576 ballots cast (46.4% vs. 44.5% countywide), ahead of Republican Chris Christie with 520 votes (41.9% vs. 47.7%), Independent Chris Daggett with 58 votes (4.7% vs. 4.8%) and other candidates with 27 votes (2.2% vs. 1.2%), among the 1,242 ballots cast by the city's 2,677 registered voters, yielding a 46.4% turnout (vs. 44.9% in the county).

United States Senate election results for Egg Harbor City1
Year	Republican		Democratic		Third party(ies)	
Year	No.	%	No.	%	No.	%
2024	793	45.50%	907	52.04%	43	2.47%
2018	589	48.92%	554	46.01%	61	5.07%
2012	590	35.39%	1,054	63.23%	23	1.38%
2006	531	45.23%	609	51.87%	34	2.90%

United States Senate election results for Egg Harbor City2
Year	Republican		Democratic		Third party(ies)	
Year	No.	%	No.	%	No.	%
2020	786	42.37%	1,011	54.50%	58	3.13%
2014	416	44.54%	487	52.14%	31	3.32%
2013	259	48.14%	267	49.63%	12	2.23%
2008	623	35.78%	1,075	61.75%	43	2.47%

== Education ==
The Egg Harbor City School District is responsible for the education of public school children in pre-kindergarten through eighth grade. As of the 2023–24 school year, the district, comprised of two schools, had an enrollment of 578 students and 60.0 classroom teachers (on an FTE basis), for a student–teacher ratio of 9.6:1. Schools in the district (with 2023–24 enrollment data from the National Center for Education Statistics) are Charles L. Spragg School with 281 students in PreK to Grade 3 and Egg Harbor City Community School with 287 students in grades 4 to 8.

Students in ninth through twelfth grades attend Cedar Creek High School, which is located in the northern section of Egg Harbor City and opened to students in September 2010. As of the 2023–24 school year, the high school had an enrollment of 942 students and 78.5 classroom teachers (on an FTE basis), for a student–teacher ratio of 12.0:1. The school is one of three high schools operated as part of the Greater Egg Harbor Regional High School District, which also includes the constituent municipalities of Egg Harbor City, Galloway Township, Hamilton Township and Mullica Township, and participates in sending/receiving relationships with Port Republic and Washington Township (Burlington County). Cedar Creek High School is zoned to serve students from Egg Harbor City, Mullica Township, Port Republic and Washington Township, while students in portions of Galloway and Hamilton townships have the opportunity to attend Cedar Creek through the school of choice program or through attendance in magnet programs offered at Cedar Creek. Seats on the nine-member board are allocated based on the population of the constituent municipalities, with one seat assigned to Egg Harbor City.

Township public school students are also eligible to attend the Atlantic County Institute of Technology in the Mays Landing section of Hamilton Township or the Charter-Tech High School for the Performing Arts, located in Somers Point.

The Pilgrim Academy is a private Christian school. Founded by Warren Allem in 1971, the school teaches children from kindergarten through 12th grade. The name is taken from John Bunyan's allegorical novel The Pilgrim's Progress.

The Roman Catholic Diocese of Camden formerly maintained the St. Nicholas School in Egg Harbor. It closed in 2007 with a private elementary school opening in its place.

== Transportation ==
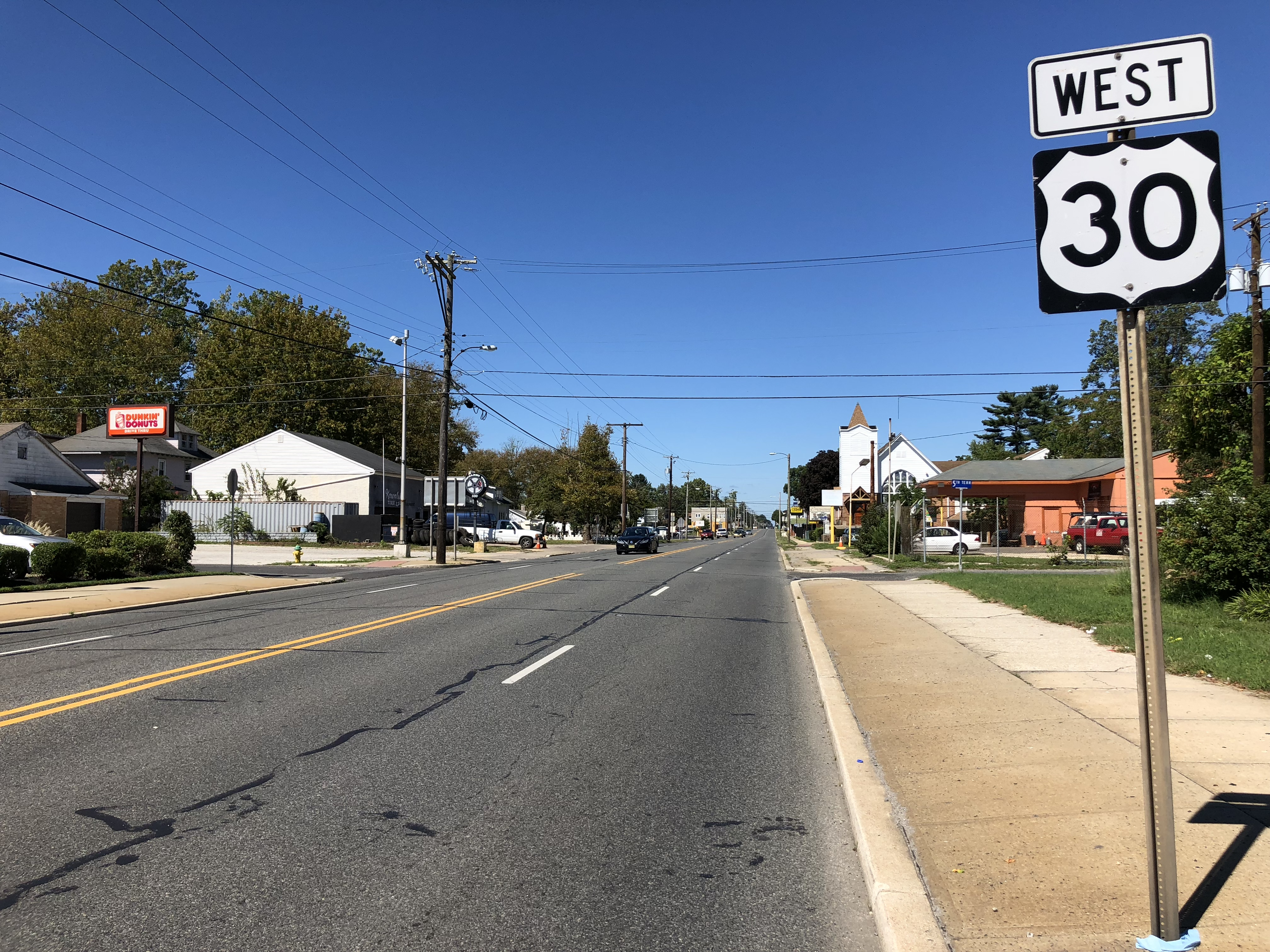
U.S. Route 30 westbound in Egg Harbor City

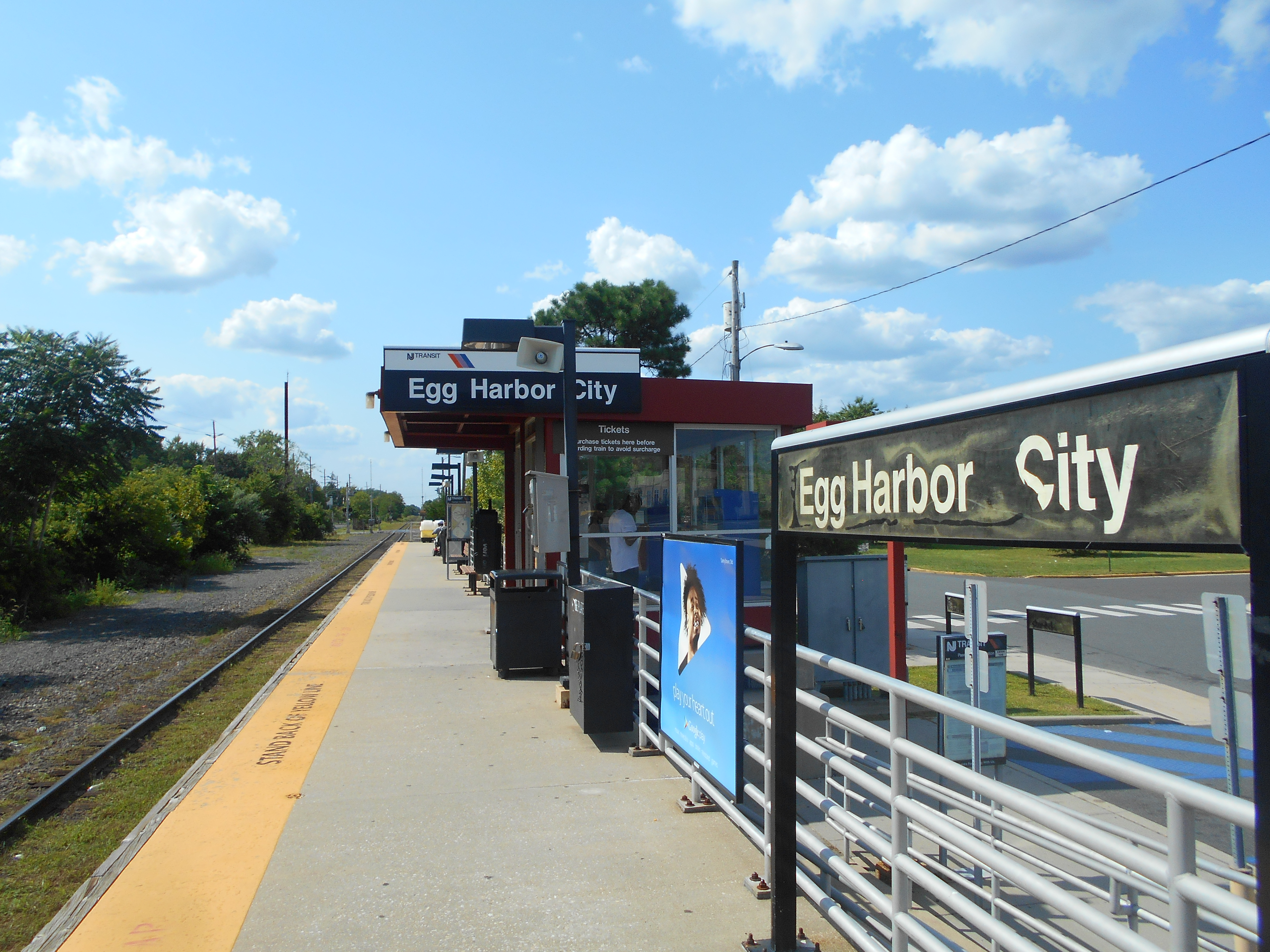
Egg Harbor City station, which is served by NJ Transit's Atlantic City Line

=== Roads and highways ===
As of May 2010, the city had a total of 50.09 miles (80.61 km) of roadways, of which 34.05 miles (54.80 km) were maintained by the municipality, 14.46 miles (23.27 km) by Atlantic County and 1.58 miles (2.54 km) by the New Jersey Department of Transportation.

U.S. Route 30 (the White Horse Pike) is the most significant highway passing through Egg Harbor City. Egg Harbor City also features the northern terminus of New Jersey Route 50, which ends at an intersection with US 30 near the center of the city. Major county routes passing through the city include County Route 561 and County Route 563.

The closest limited access road is the Atlantic City Expressway which is two towns away in Hamilton Township while the Garden State Parkway is accessible in neighboring Galloway Township.

=== Public transportation ===
The Egg Harbor City station provides NJ Transit service on the Atlantic City Line, connecting 30th Street Station in Philadelphia and the Atlantic City Rail Terminal in Atlantic City.

NJ Transit provides bus service to and from Atlantic City on the 554 route.

The South Jersey Transportation Authority provides shuttle bus service connecting the Egg Harbor City train station with Atlantic City International Airport and Stockton University, as well as other area locations.

== Wineries ==
- Renault Winery
- Sylvin Farms Winery

== Notable people ==
People who were born in, residents of, or otherwise closely associated with Egg Harbor City include:

- Lou Bauer (1898–1979), baseball player who played a single major league game, for the Philadelphia Athletics, as a 19-year-old
- Kathleen Crowley (1929–2017), actress
- John D'Agostino (born 1982), professional poker player
- Carl Husta (1902–1951), professional baseball and basketball player
- Louis Kuehnle (1857–1934), entrepreneur and politician who was a pioneer in the early development of Atlantic City
- Frank Morgenweck (1875–1941), basketball player, coach and administrator, member of the Basketball Hall of Fame
- Peace Pilgrim (1908–1981, born Mildred Lisette Norman), peace activist honored in Egg Harbor City by Peace Pilgrim Park and by a birthday celebration each year in July
- Lindsey Petrosh (born 1989), Miss New Jersey 2012
- Tim Reilly, head coach of the Lafayette Leopards baseball team
- Charles Saalmann (1838–1909), infantry captain in the Civil War, Acting Commissary of Subsistence in General William T. Sherman's March to the Sea, vintner

== See also ==
- Egg Harbor Township, New Jersey
- Little Egg Harbor Township, New Jersey
