= Atco station =

NJ Transit rail station

Atco
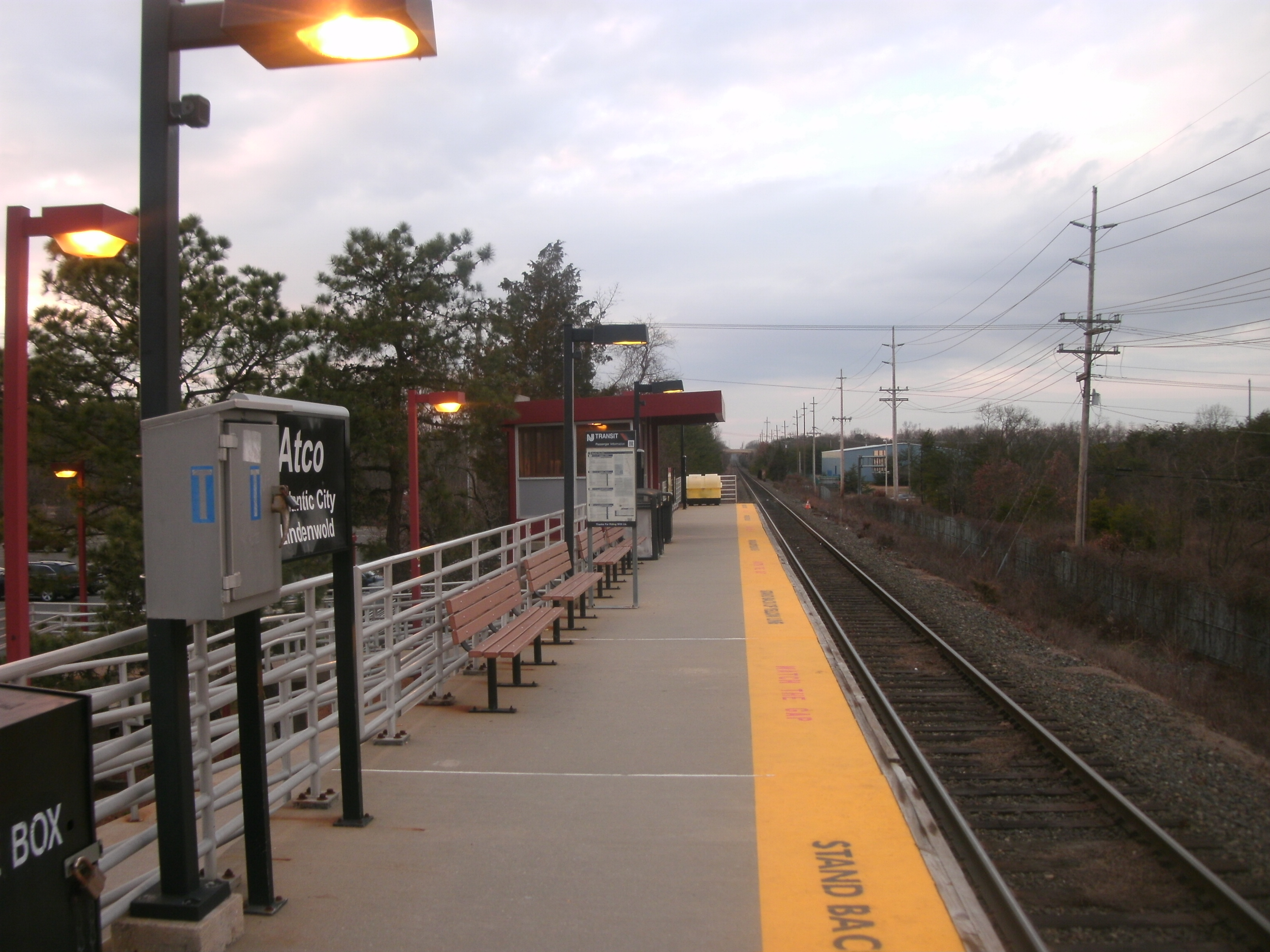
- The station platform at Atco, as seen facing westbound towards Lindenwold station on New Year's Eve in 2011.

General information
- Location: CW Haines Boulevard east of Route 73; Waterford Township, New Jersey
- Coordinates: 39.7836°N 74.9078°W
- Owner: New Jersey Transit
- Platforms: 1 side platform
- Tracks: 1
- Connections: NJ Transit Bus: 554

Construction
- Parking: 189 spaces
- Cycle facilities: Racks
- Accessible: Yes

Other information
- Station code: Amtrak: ATO

History
- Opened: May 23, 1989 (Amtrak); September 17, 1989 (NJ Transit)

Passengers
- 2025: 45 (average weekday)
- Rank: 142 of 153

Services
Preceding station	NJ Transit	Following station
Lindenwold toward Philadelphia	Atlantic City Line	Hammonton toward Atlantic City
Location

Atco station is an active commuter railroad station in the Atco section of Waterford Township, Camden County, New Jersey. Located on CW Haines Boulevard (off State Route 73) between the borough of Berlin and downtown Atco, the station services trains of NJ Transit's Atlantic City Line between 30th Street Station in Philadelphia, Pennsylvania and Atlantic City Rail Terminal in the eponymous Atlantic City. It also services NJ Transit's 554 bus, which runs between Lindenwold station and the Atlantic City Bus Terminal. The station consists of a single high-level side platform and track.

Atco station is on the site of the former Bishop's Bridge station of the Pennsylvania-Reading Seashore Lines (PRSL), which was located just east of Route 73 (former Route S-41). Atco station opened with the debut of NJ Transit's Atlantic City service on September 17, 1989, almost four months after Amtrak debuted their Atlantic City Express.
