= Atlantic City Jitney Association =

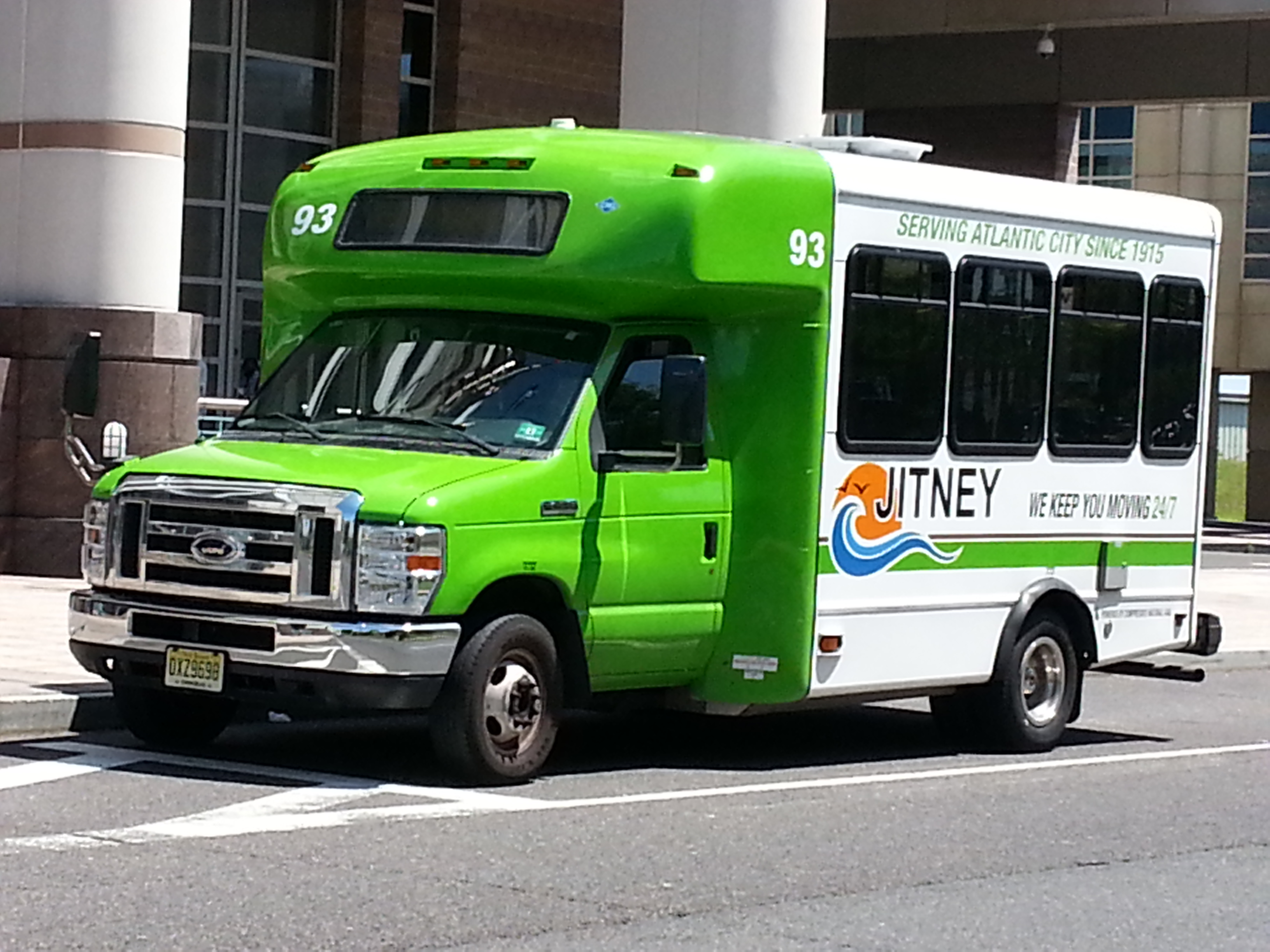
- One of the 2010-era fleet of jitneys parked near the Atlantic City Rail Terminal.
- Founded: 1915
- Headquarters: 201 Pacific Avenue; Atlantic City, NJ
- Locale: Atlantic City
- Service type: Public minibus transit
- Routes: 7
- Website: jitneyac.com

The Atlantic City Jitney Association (ACJA) is an association of operators of minibus service in Atlantic City, New Jersey, providing service at all times on 3 fixed routes, daytime service on a fourth fixed route, and bus-to-rail connections from the Atlantic City Rail Terminal, providing connections to Atlantic City Line trains. The jitney service in Atlantic City started in 1915. The type of vehicle used has changed several times over the years. The classic International Harvester Metro Van was used in the 1960s. In 2010, the service switched to a fleet of bright green and white Ford E-450 vehicles powered by compressed natural gas.

== Routes ==
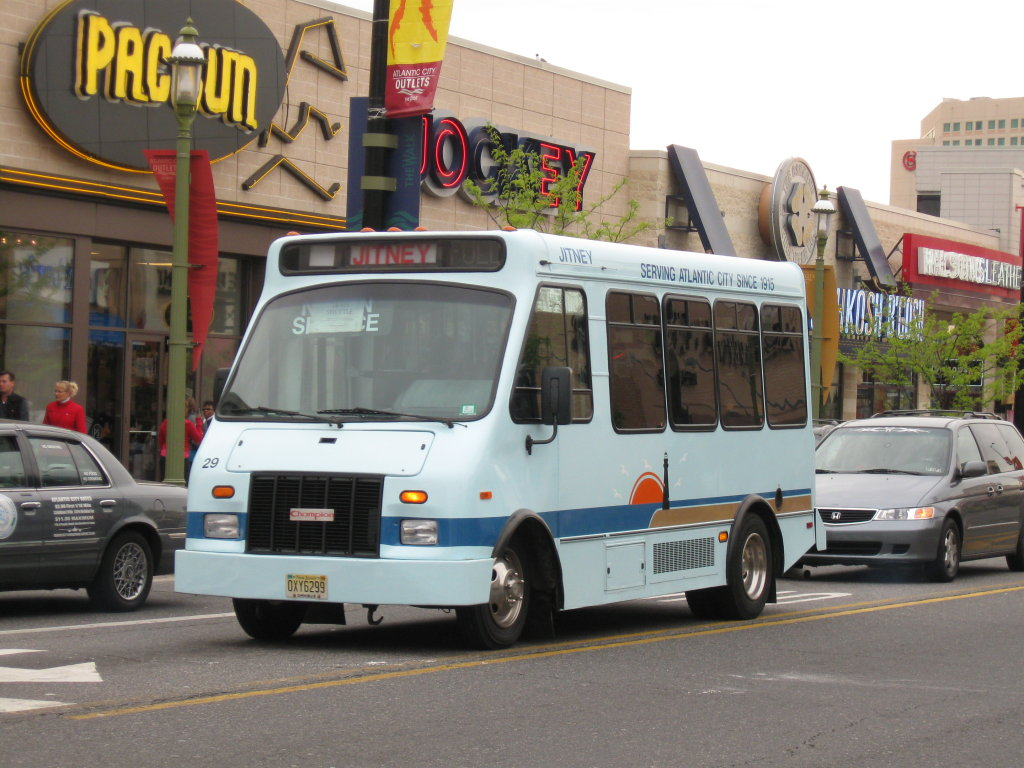
Jitney #29 operates down North Michigan Avenue through The Walk Outlets to the Atlantic City Rail Terminal in 2008.

=== Fixed-route service ===
The ACJA operates service on four routes. The one-way fare for the jitney is $3.00.

Route	Terminals		Main streets
1 (Pink)	Ventnor Avenue and Jackson Avenue (Atlantic City/Ventnor city line)	Pacific Avenue and New Hampshire Avenue	Pacific Avenue; Atlantic Avenue
2 (Blue)	Borgata, Harrah's Atlantic City, and Golden Nugget	Delaware Avenue and Pacific Avenue	Maryland Avenue; Delaware Avenue
3 (Green)	Borgata, Harrah's Atlantic City, and Golden Nugget	Pacific Avenue and New Hampshire Avenue	Dr. Martin Luther King Jr. Boulevard; Pacific Avenue
4 (Orange; runs 7 AM to 7 PM only)	Ventnor Avenue and Jackson Avenue (Atlantic City/Ventnor city line)	Atlantic City Rail Terminal	Pacific Avenue; Atlantic Avenue; Michigan Avenue

=== Bus-to-rail shuttles ===
These routes run to and from the Atlantic City Rail Terminal, fare-free. These lines were formerly operated by New Jersey Transit.

Route	Region served	Casinos served
1	Downtown/Midtown	Tropicana, Caesars, Wild Wild West, Bally's, The Claridge Hotel
2	Uptown	Resorts, Hard Rock, Ocean
3	Marina	Harrah's Atlantic City, Golden Nugget, Borgata

== See also ==
- List of New Jersey Transit bus routes (500-549) – other local routes within Atlantic City and Atlantic County
- List of New Jersey Transit bus routes (550-599) – long-distance service from the Atlantic City Bus Terminal
