= Hammonton station =

NJ Transit rail station

Hammonton
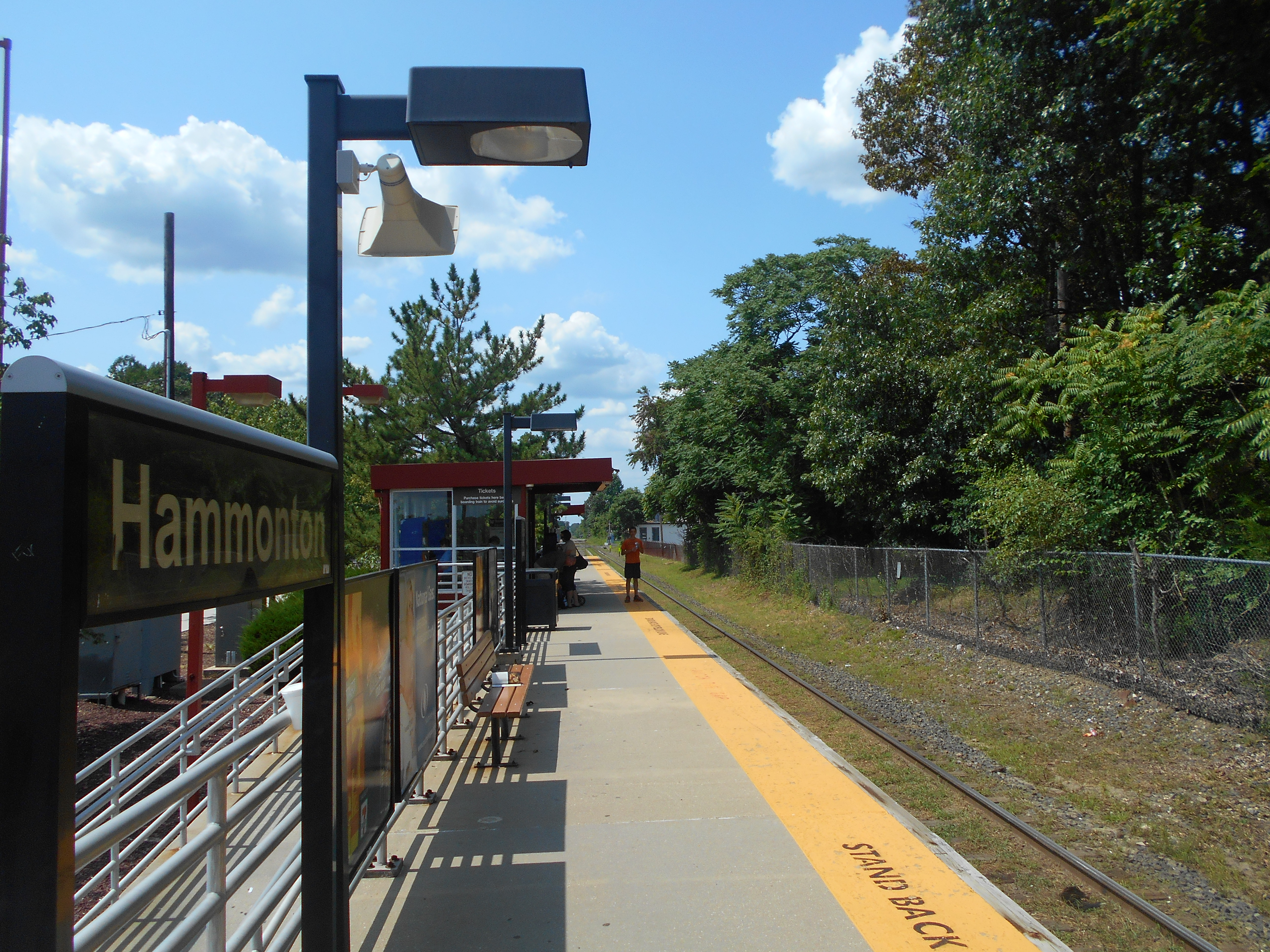
- Hammonton station in August 2014.

General information
- Location: Egg Harbor Road and Line Street; Hammonton, New Jersey
- Coordinates: 39.6316°N 74.7995°W
- Owner: NJ Transit
- Platforms: 1 side platform
- Tracks: 1
- Connections: NJ Transit Bus: 554; South Jersey Transportation Authority: Route 54/40 Community Shuttle

Construction
- Parking: Yes
- Accessible: yes

Other information
- Station code: Amtrak: HTN

History
- Opened: May 23, 1989 (Amtrak); September 17, 1989 (NJ Transit)

Passengers
- 2025: 62 (average weekday)
- Rank: 133 of 153

Services
Preceding station	NJ Transit	Following station
Atco toward Philadelphia	Atlantic City Line	Egg Harbor City toward Atlantic City
Location

Hammonton is an active commuter railroad station in the town of Hammonton, Atlantic County, New Jersey. Located between the grade crossings of Line Street and 11th Street in Hammonton, the station services trains of New Jersey Transit's Atlantic City Line, which operates between 30th Street Station in Philadelphia, Pennsylvania and the Atlantic City Rail Terminal in the eponymous Atlantic City, New Jersey. Hammonton station consists of a single side platform with a shelter that contains a ticket vending machine and a 228 space parking lot operated by New Jersey Transit, free of charge to riders. New Jersey Transit operates the 554 bus route between Lindenwold station and the Atlantic City Bus Terminal, making all stops at Atlantic City Line stations. Connection to the 554 is available at the junction of Egg Harbor Road (County Route 602) and Bellevue Avenue. Amtrak Thruway bus service, operated by New Jersey Transit, via 30th Street Station and South Jersey Transportation Authority's Route 54/40 Community Shuttle also service Hammonton station. The shuttle connects riders in Hamilton to Buena Vista Township on weekdays, where connections are available to Cape May and Wildwood.
