= Egg Harbor City station =

NJ Transit rail station

Egg Harbor City
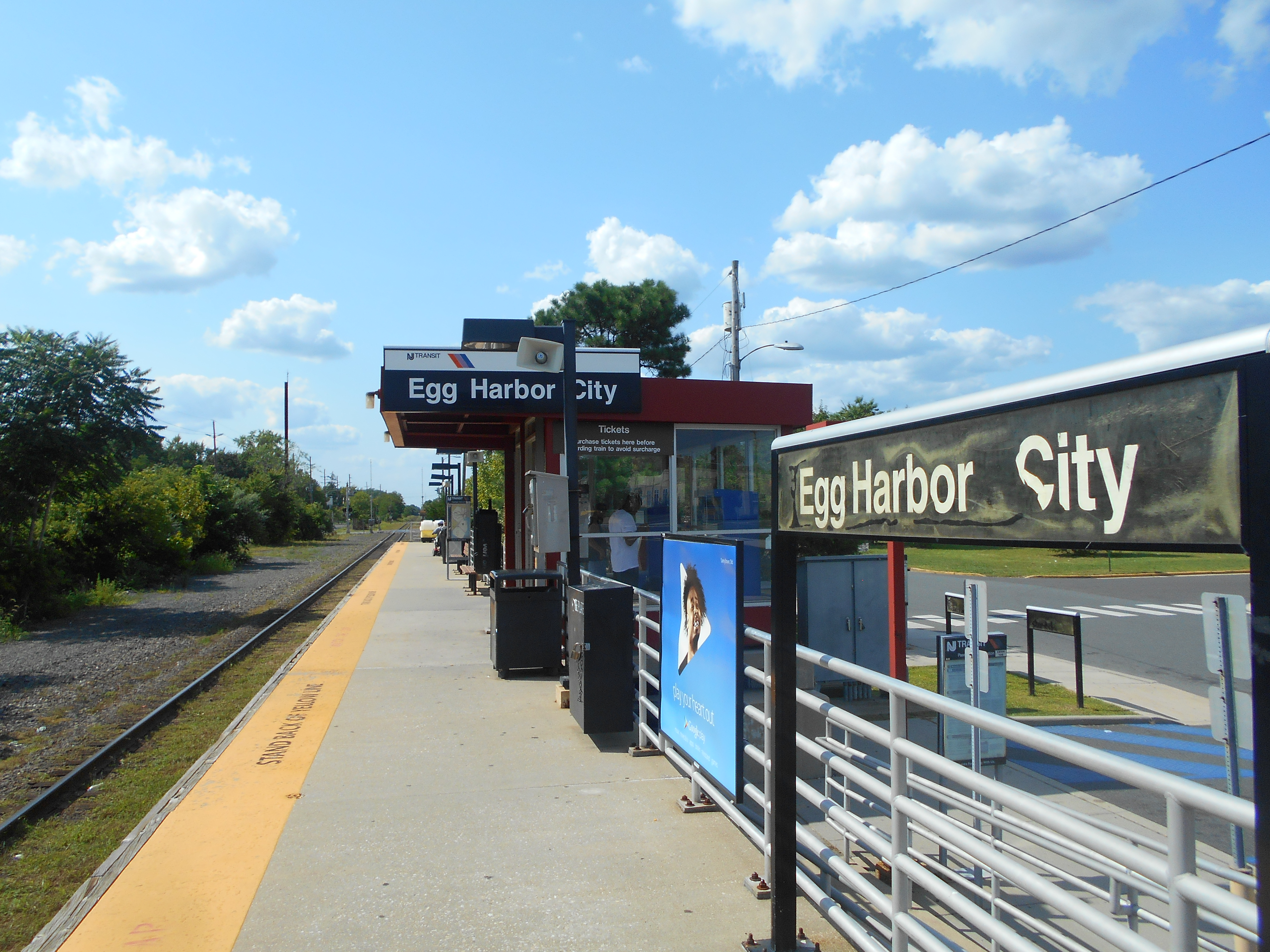
- Egg Harbor City station in August 2014

General information
- Location: Route 30 near Philadelphia Avenue; Egg Harbor City, New Jersey
- Coordinates: 39.5265°N 74.6481°W
- Owner: NJ Transit
- Platforms: 1 side platform
- Tracks: 1
- Connections: NJ Transit Bus: 554

Construction
- Platform levels: 1
- Parking: Yes
- Accessible: Yes

Other information
- Station code: Amtrak: EGH

History
- Opened: May 23, 1989 (Amtrak); September 17, 1989 (NJ Transit)

Passengers
- 2025: 79 (average weekday)
- Rank: 126 of 153

Services
Preceding station	NJ Transit	Following station
Hammonton toward Philadelphia	Atlantic City Line	Absecon toward Atlantic City
Location

Egg Harbor City is a train station in Egg Harbor City, New Jersey. It serves NJ Transit trains and buses, as well as the Amtrak Thruway. Buses to Atlantic City and the PATCO Speedline at the Lindenwold station connect at this station.
