= Absecon station =

NJ Transit rail station

Absecon
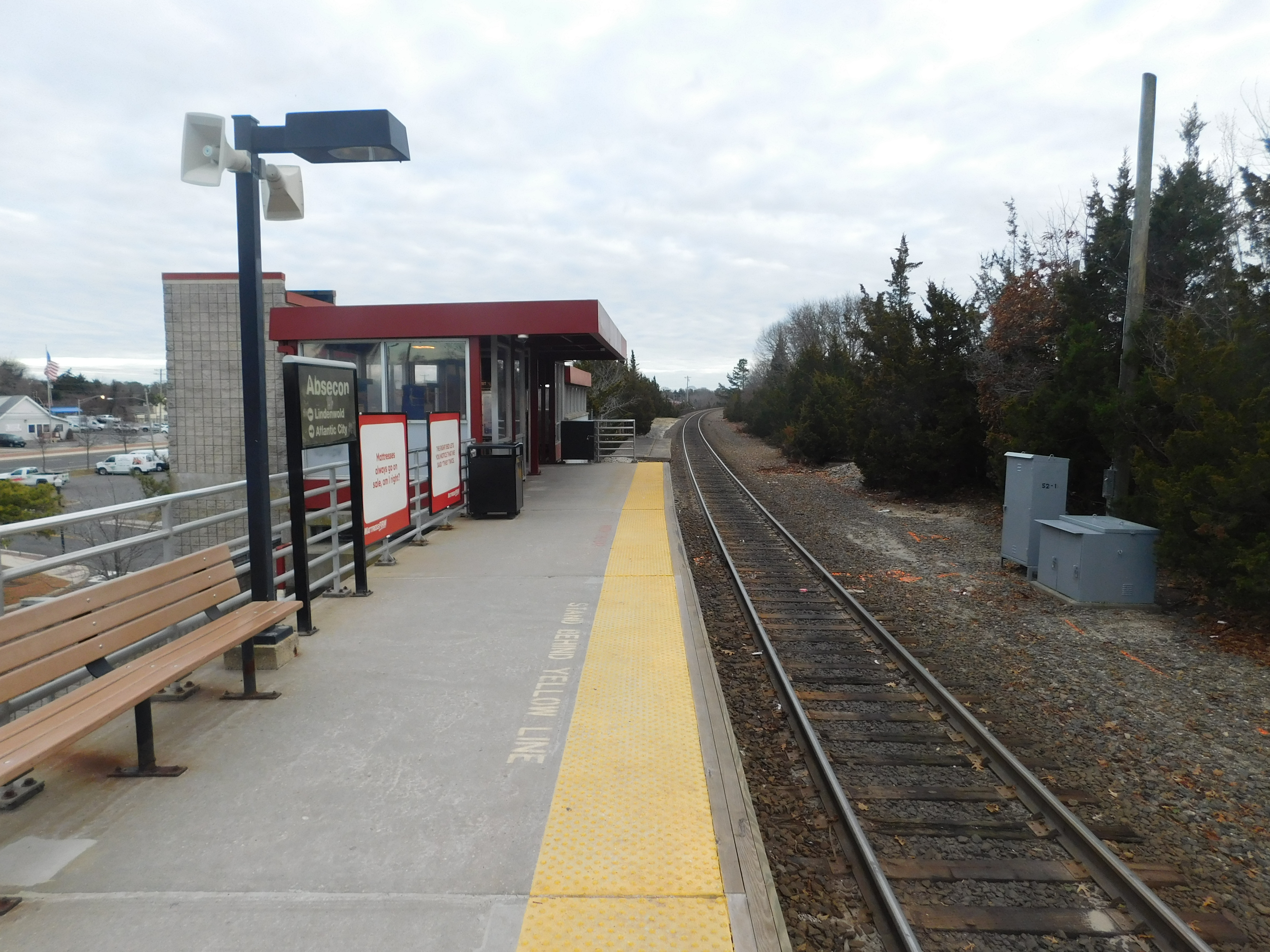
- Station platform in January 2018.

General information
- Location: South Station Avenue and Ohio Avenue; Absecon, New Jersey
- Coordinates: 39°25′27″N 74°30′06″W
- Owner: NJ Transit
- Platforms: 1
- Tracks: 1
- Connections: NJ Transit Bus: 508, 554, 559

Construction
- Structure type: Elevated
- Platform levels: 1
- Parking: 170 spaces plus 6 accessible spaces
- Cycle facilities: Yes
- Accessible: Yes

Other information
- Station code: Amtrak: ABN

History
- Opened: July 4, 1854 (Camden and Atlantic Railroad); May 23, 1989 (Amtrak); September 17, 1989 (NJ Transit)
- Former names: Absecon–Pleasantville

Passengers
- 2025: 128 (average weekday)
- Rank: 111 of 153

Services
Preceding station	NJ Transit	Following station
Egg Harbor City toward Philadelphia	Atlantic City Line	Atlantic City Terminus
Former services
Preceding station	Pennsylvania-Reading Seashore Lines	Following station
Pomona toward Camden	WJ&S Main Line	Atlantic City Terminus
Location

Absecon is a NJ Transit station in Absecon, New Jersey on the Atlantic City Line. It is located at South Station and Ohio Avenues.

In 1938, the New Jersey Board of Public Utilities ordered the elimination of grade crossings in Absecon. The project was more than a mile long and covered five crossings. By this time, the Pennsylvania-Reading Seashore Lines (who owned it at the time) was five years old. The railroad was already working on acquiring land in August of that year. Due to the need to span Absecon Creek and Shore Road, an 'unusual' concrete and steel trestle was planned. It appears that the project was funded, at least in part, by the Public Works Administration. In March 1940, the project reportedly cost $1.5 million and included a 'fireproof' station level with the elevated tracks. Even with the 1989 upgrade of the line owned by NJ Transit, most of the Absecon station still survives 72 years later.

Most commuters drive to Absecon station (or are dropped off by others in cars). In 2019, the Absecon town council applied for transit village status from the New Jersey state government. The program provides state funding for a variety of infrastructure improvements if high-density buildings are added near mass transit locations. In Absecon's case, the proposal would be to build more housing in its downtown within walking distance of the Absecon train station.
