= Atlantic City Line =

Commuter rail line in New Jersey and Pennsylvania

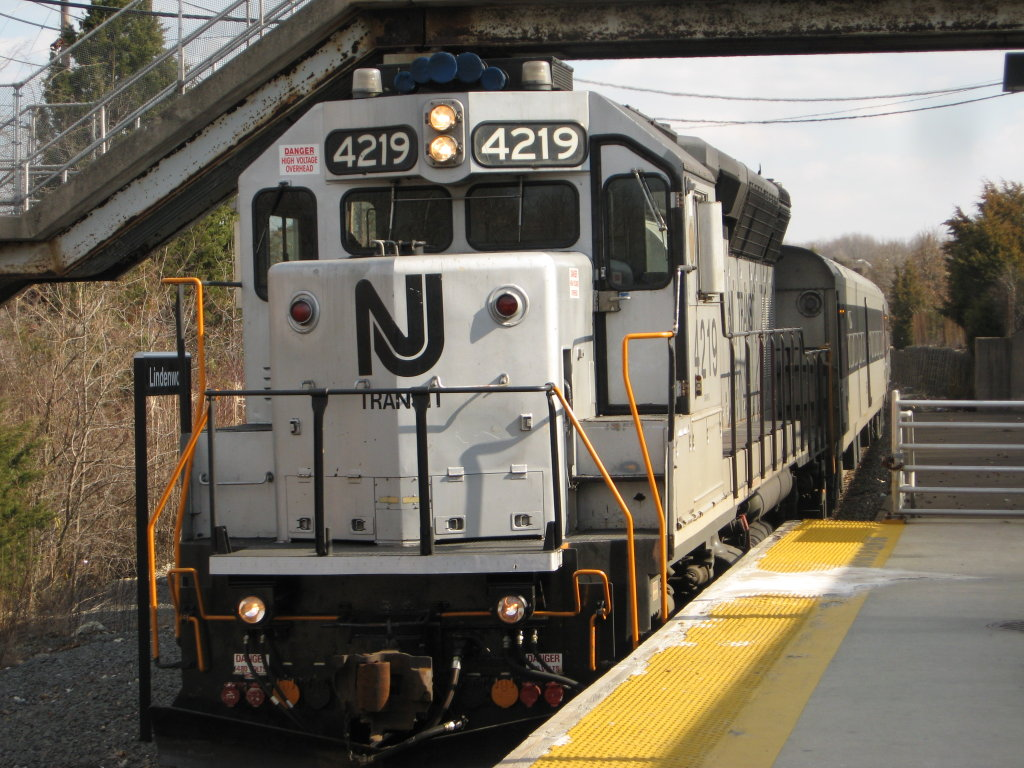
- An Atlantic City Line train at Lindenwold station in 2008

Overview
- Owner: New Jersey Transit (Atlantic City to River Line); Conrail Shared Assets (Delair Bridge to Shore interlocking); Amtrak (Shore interlocking to 30th Street)
- Locale: White Horse Pike corridor
- Termini: Atlantic City Rail Terminal (east); 30th Street Station, Philadelphia (west)
- Stations: 9

Service
- Type: Commuter rail
- System: NJ Transit Rail Operations
- Operator: New Jersey Transit
- Rolling stock: GP40PH-2B locomotives, Comet coaches
- Daily ridership: 1,900 (Q1, FY 2025)

Technical
- Num of tracks: 1 plus sidings (Shore Interlocking to Atlantic City-Brigantine Connector)
- Track gauge: 4 ft 8 1/2 in (1,435 mm) standard gauge

The Atlantic City Line (ACL) is a commuter rail line operated by NJ Transit (NJT) in the United States between Philadelphia, Pennsylvania and Atlantic City, New Jersey, operating along the corridor of the White Horse Pike. It runs over trackage that was controlled by both the Pennsylvania Railroad (PRR) and the Pennsylvania-Reading Seashore Lines. It shares trackage with SEPTA and Amtrak on the Northeast Corridor (NEC) until it crosses the Delaware River on Conrail's Delair Bridge into New Jersey.

The Atlantic City Line also shares the right-of-way with the PATCO Speedline between Haddonfield and Lindenwold, New Jersey. There are 12 departures each day in each direction. Conrail also uses short sections of the line for freight movements (which are segregated), including the NEC-Delair Bridge section to its main freight yard in Camden, New Jersey. Unlike all other NJT railway lines, the Atlantic City line does not have traditional rush hour service. The Atlantic City line is colored dark blue on New Jersey Transit's system maps, and the line's symbol is a lighthouse, an homage to the Absecon Lighthouse.

== History ==
1915 Pennsylvania Railroad publication touting New Jersey beaches.

In the late 19th and early 20th centuries, Atlantic City was the major seaside vacation destination for the Philadelphia area for both wealthy and working class alike. Similar to Coney Island in New York, the popularity of Atlantic City was made possible by rail transport providing inexpensive service between the city where people lived and the seashore where they played. By its height in the 1920s, there were no fewer than three competing railroad Main Lines connecting the Atlantic City resort with Philadelphia, the Atlantic City Railroad (ACRR), owned by the Reading Company, the Camden and Atlantic (C&A) and the West Jersey and Seashore (WJ&S), both owned by the PRR. Competition was fierce and the ACRR and C&A lines boasted some of the fastest trains in the world, while the WJ&S was a pioneering example of railroad electrification.

The Great Depression caused the first consolidation of the various competing lines into the new Pennsylvania-Reading Seashore Lines (PRSL), but the post-war rise of the automobile and the Atlantic City Expressway not only caused people to abandon the railroad for their cars, but also to abandon Atlantic City for more exotic vacation destinations. By the late 1960s, the surviving former Camden and Atlantic Main Line was reduced to a commuter service funded by the New Jersey Department of Transportation (NJDOT) running trains of Budd RDC railcars operating from a small terminal at the Lindenwold PATCO station. Conrail took over from the PRSL in 1976, maintaining service between Lindenwold and Atlantic City, Ocean City and Cape May. In 1981 NJDOT discontinued the chronically under-performing South Jersey rail services south of Atlantic City to Cape May City and Ocean City. The following year, on June 30, 1982, passenger rail service between Lindenwold and Atlantic City was stopped as poor track conditions led to 15-mph speed restrictions on 29 miles of track.

Almost immediately, there was talk of restoring the line to Atlantic City. Casino gambling had brought the aging resort back from the brink of financial collapse and local politicians were irritated that most railway transportation projects benefited the more populous northern portion of the state. A deal with Amtrak was worked out where the line, suffering from decades of deferred maintenance and in places outright abandonment, would be completely rebuilt for a new Amtrak service. Dubbed the "Gambler's Express," service connected Atlantic City with cities up and down the Northeast Corridor as well as a local commuter service run by NJT.

=== 1989 revival ===
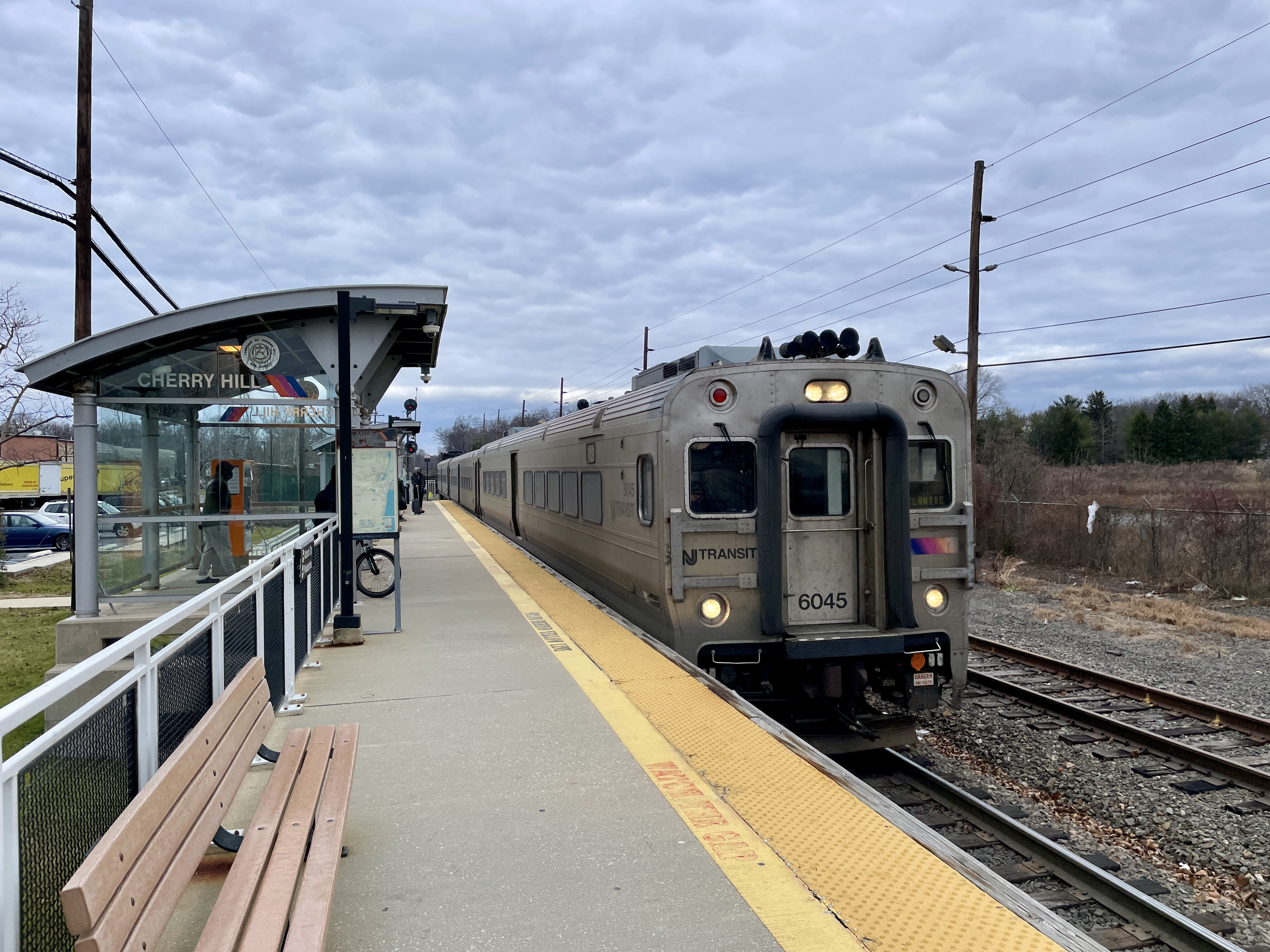
Cherry Hill was opened in 1994; it briefly served Amtrak trains as well as NJ Transit

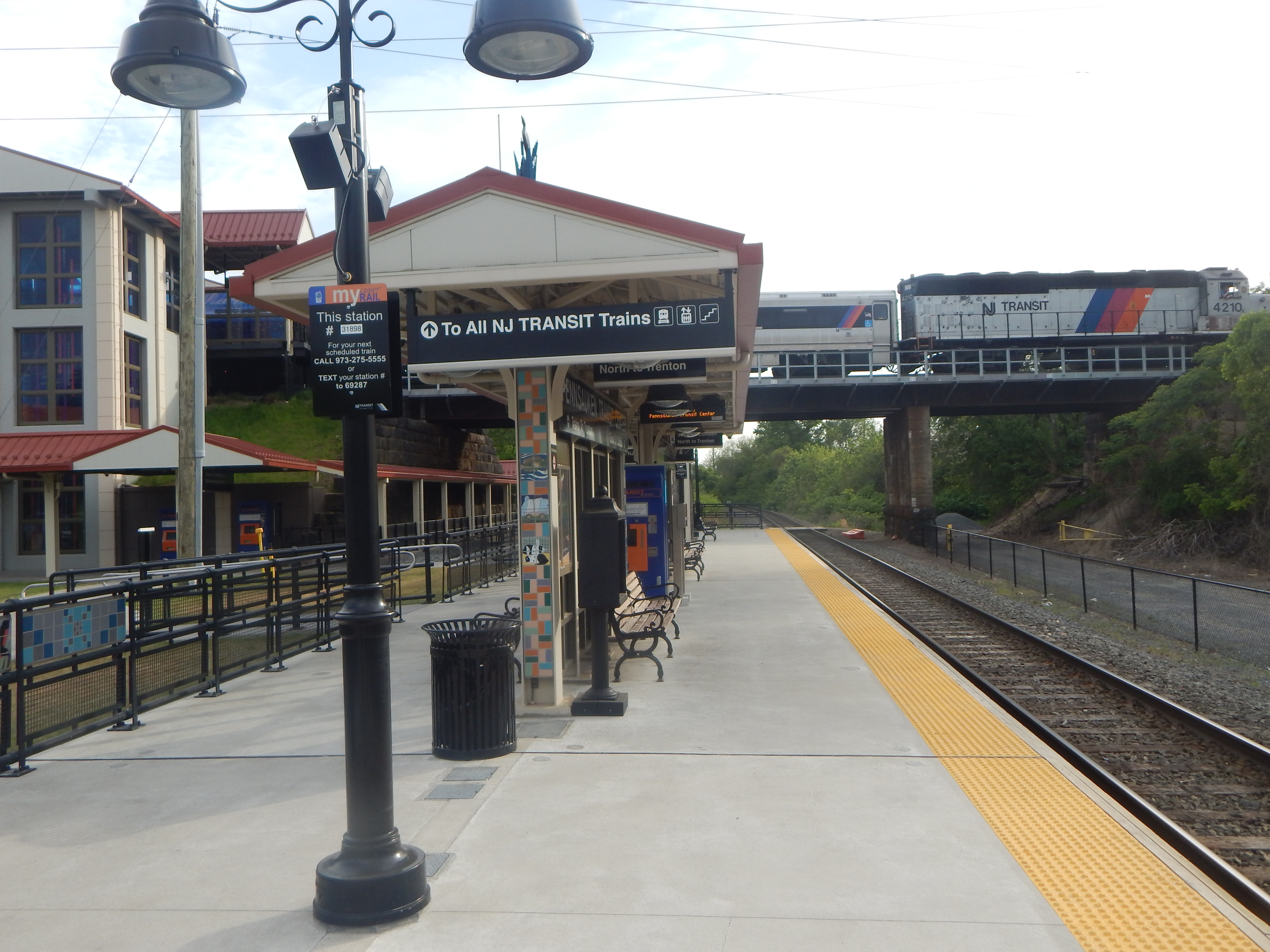
Pennsauken Transit Center opened in 2013 to provide a connection between Atlantic City Line trains (top) and River Line trains

The line reopened May 23, 1989, with Amtrak Atlantic City Express service running from New York, Philadelphia, and Washington. Service was soon extended to Springfield, Massachusetts, and Richmond, and for a brief period, the Philadelphia International Airport. NJT commuter service between Atlantic City and Lindenwold began in September. At Lindenwold, passengers had to transfer to PATCO. By 1994, Amtrak realized that their Atlantic City plan was poorly marketed, and high fares hurt potential ridership. As a result, it was announced that Amtrak would discontinue service effective April 1, 1995.

Initially, there were worries that NJT would also cease operations, as Amtrak had been helping maintain the track and NJT would be forced to buy its own fueling facility. However, NJT reluctantly opted to stay, as the line was the transit agency's only commuter line in South Jersey. For the time being, a target of a US $1 million subsidy reduction was set in March 1996. NJT eventually extended service into Philadelphia (via Amtrak's 30th Street Station), and a new station facility was built in Cherry Hill, New Jersey. Ridership increased and NJT decided to maintain the line after declaring that the line's ridership had met the target set for it.

Another improvement that has since occurred was the starting of a shuttle service between the Atlantic City Rail Terminal and the city's casinos. Free jitneys shuttle passengers to the shore and the various casinos.

The line received some damage from Hurricane Sandy on October 29–30, 2012, causing suspension of service after the storm moved away. However, the damage was not as severe as on other NJT rail lines in the northern part of the state, and normal rail service was restored by November 4, one of the few NJT rail lines to do so in such short time.

Later, NJ Transit built a transfer station in Pennsauken to connect the Atlantic City Line with the River Line, which runs from Camden to Trenton, where it meets up with Northeast Corridor trains to New York. This enables Atlantic City passengers to travel as far as New York completely on New Jersey Transit rail and light rail and avoid transfers in Pennsylvania for the first time. The Pennsauken Transit Center opened to passengers on October 14, 2013.

Also operating along the line, but not making any stops along it, was the Atlantic City Express Service (ACES), a route owned by Caesars Entertainment and the Borgata and operated by NJ Transit under contract. This route operated between the Atlantic City Rail Terminal and Pennsylvania Station in Midtown Manhattan. This service began in February 2009 and ended in March 2012.

On September 4, 2018, the line was shut down so NJ Transit could replace a portion of the track, as well as install positive train control to comply with a December 31 deadline from the Federal Railroad Administration. The rail line was the only one in New Jersey that was shut down in its entirety, which sparked criticism from residents. NJ Transit operated bus service along the route while the rail line was shut down. Service - including an additional morning peak trip to Philadelphia - resumed along with the Princeton Branch on May 12, 2019.

=== Proposed stations ===
On May 12, 2009, New Jersey Governor Jon S. Corzine, in conjunction with the Delaware River Port Authority (the agency which manages the PATCO Speedline), announced plans to review ways to expand and enhance the Atlantic City Line, in which the DRPA would "examine opportunities to improve this system including the development of a Transfer Station at the PATCO Woodcrest Station allowing for more convenient transfers between PATCO, New Jersey Transit and convenient access from I-295" and "also identify track improvements to facilitate more frequent, reliable service and a better connection to the Atlantic City Airport Terminal." The study would be part of a comprehensive transportation plan for South Jersey that would include a new diesel light rail line between Camden and Glassboro and express bus service along the NJ 42 and NJ 55 freeways. The cost for the Atlantic City Airport station was estimated at $32 million in 2013. However, in 2014, any plans described by the study to increase frequency to reliable hourly service, and to add planned Woodcrest and Airport transfer stations, were nixed because of state budget tightening.

In 2016, two state assemblymen – Tim Eustace and John Wisniewski – introduced a bill that mandated for the state to build a train station at the Atlantic City Airport, but the bill was never brought to the floor for a vote. In 2021, NJT and the SJTA commissioned a study to build a station near the airport along the White Horse Pike, adjacent to a proposed mixed-used development. The study included the potential for a spur rail line into the airport, or a new bus line to transport passengers from the proposed station to the airport. In May 2022, the New Jersey Senate passed a bill that allowed the Casino Reinvestment Development Authority to provide funding toward the proposed airport link.

== Operations ==
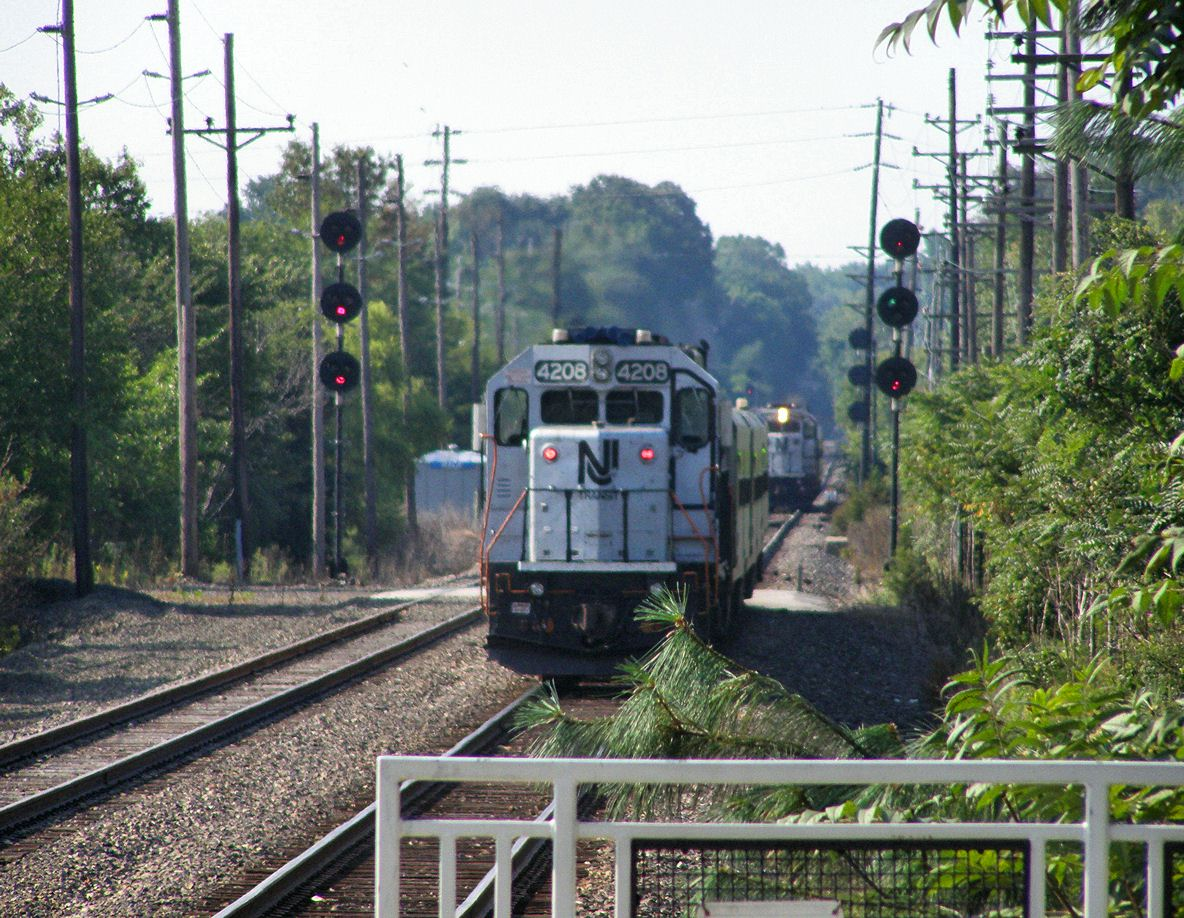
Two Atlantic City Line trains perform a scheduled meet at a passing siding in Cherry Hill

The line was originally double-tracked but is now a single-track operation, with 5,000-foot (1,500 m) passing sidings along its length. The Atlantic City Rail Terminal incorporates a fueling facility and trains are fueled in between midday runs. Daily inspections and light maintenance are performed at the Atlantic City Rail Terminal by Herzog Transit Services, while heavy maintenance must take place in NJT's facility in North Jersey. Both cars and locomotives involved with servicing are shuttled up and down Amtrak's Northeast Corridor on weekends for washing and heavy maintenance as needed.

As rebuilt by Amtrak, most of the line was equipped with cab signaling and built to Class 4 track standards allowing speeds up to 80 miles per hour (130 km/h). Around 10 miles (16 km) of tangent track around Absecon was built to Class 5 standards, allowing speeds up to 90 miles per hour (140 km/h). Several years after Amtrak ceased operation on the line, NJT downgraded this segment to Class 4 due to maintenance cost considerations. Until 1995, Amtrak's Section E dispatcher controlled the line from 30th Street Station in Philadelphia, but after the incorporation into the NJT system, the dispatching was shifted to Hoboken Terminal, and later the Meadowlands Maintenance Complex.

Prior to the 1995 takeover, NJT trains terminating at Lindenwold would actually run to just east of the present day Cherry Hill Station where the nearest passing siding was located in order to clear the line for "Gambler's Express" trains and to allow the crew to change ends. After the terminal was moved to 30th Street Station, NJT commuter trains laid over at the south end of the station platforms to allow the diesel locomotives to exhaust into the open air (as opposed to under the confined space under 30th Street Station).

== Service ==
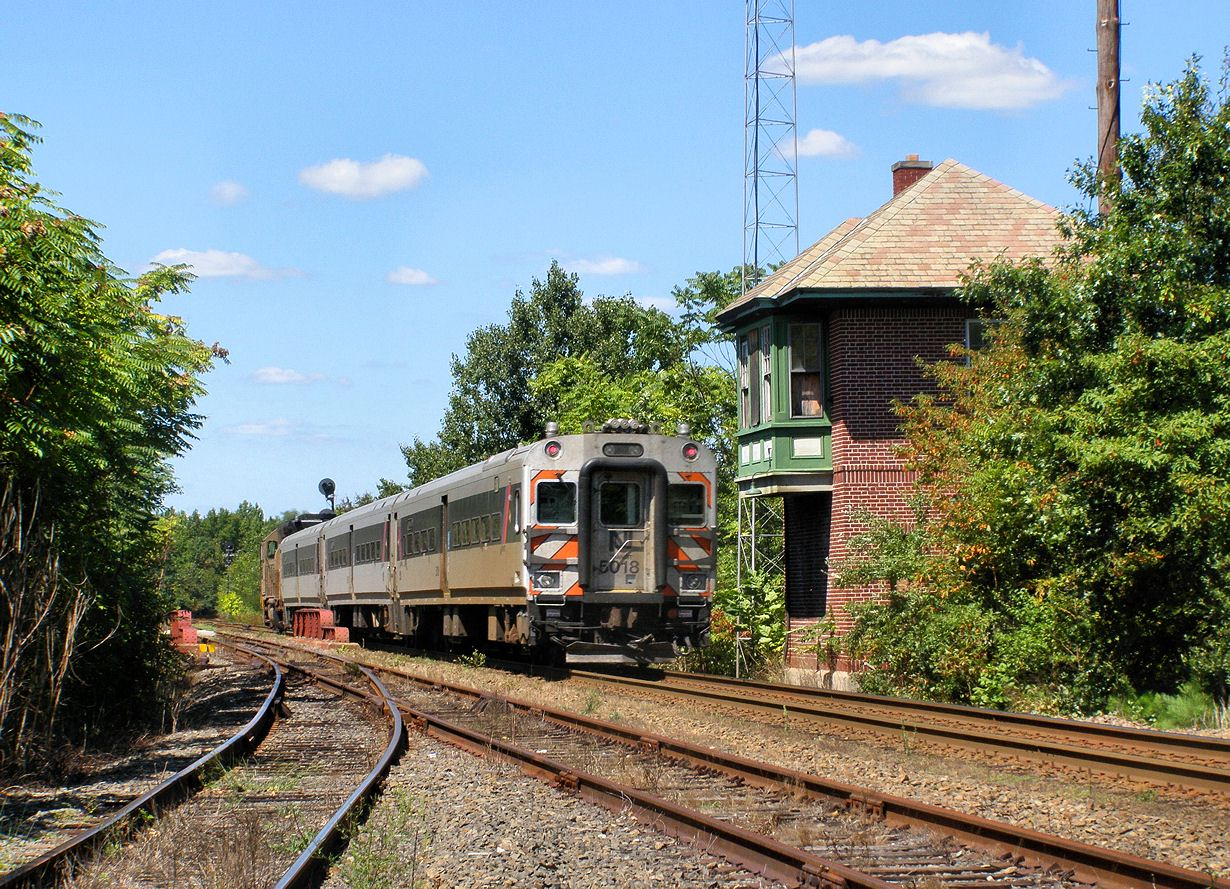
An Atlantic City Line trainset passing the closed WINSLOW tower at Winslow Junction

Regularly scheduled service on the Atlantic City Line consists mainly of GP40PH-2B diesel locomotives pushing or pulling primarily three to four Comet passenger cars. When Amtrak had regular service on this line, power was provided by now-retired F40PH locomotives, with a Metroliner cab car on the opposite end to provide push-pull operation. All trains run with the locomotive on the west end and the cab control car on the east end to facilitate boarding and reduce diesel noise and exhaust issues at the Atlantic City Terminal.

Originally, a type of proof-of-payment fare collection was envisioned for the line to cut down on operating costs. Standard railway tickets were purchased from vending machines which then had to be validated prior to boarding. However, the system was never fully implemented and tickets were always collected normally on board by conductors.

In 2014, the line had around 1 million riders, which declined to 800,000 in 2016. Daily ridership is around 2,000 passengers.

=== Cross-honoring ===
Atlantic City Line train tickets are also honored on the 551 and 554 NJT bus lines for travel to and from railroad stations at all times. Customers using rail tickets to ride the 554 line must board and alight directly at or within one block of the Lindenwold, Hammonton, Egg Harbor City, or Absecon train stations, or at the Atlantic City Bus Terminal. Tickets for travel between Philadelphia and Atlantic City are honored on the 551 between the bus terminals in the two cities.

== Stations ==
State	Location	Station	Miles (km)	Date opened	Date closed	Connections/notes
PA	Philadelphia	30th Street Station	0.0 (0.0)	1933		Amtrak (long-distance): Cardinal, Crescent, Palmetto, Silver Meteor; Amtrak (intercity): Acela, Carolinian, Keystone Service, Pennsylvanian, Northeast Regional, Vermonter; SEPTA Regional Rail: all lines SEPTA Metro: NJ Transit Bus: 316, 414, 417, 555; SEPTA City Bus: 9, 12, 21, 30, 31, 42, 44, 49, LUCY; SEPTA Suburban Bus: 124, 125; Martz Trailways; Peter Pan
NJ	Pennsauken Twp.	Pennsauken	10.3 (16.6)	2013		NJ Transit: River Line; NJ Transit Bus: 404, 417, 419
NJ	Cherry Hill	Cherry Hill	14.2 (22.9)	July 2, 1994		NJ Transit Bus: 406, 450
NJ	Lindenwold	Lindenwold	21.4 (34.4)	1969		PATCO; NJ Transit Bus: 403, 459, 554
NJ	Berlin	Berlin		1856	1960s	
NJ	Atco	Atco	27.5 (44.3)	September 17, 1989		NJ Transit Bus: 554
NJ	Hammonton	Hammonton	40.5 (65.2)	September 17, 1989		NJ Transit Bus: 554; South Jersey Transportation Authority: Route 54/40 Community Shuttle
NJ	Egg Harbor City	Egg Harbor City	51.4 (82.7)	September 17, 1989		NJ Transit Bus: 554; South Jersey Transportation Authority: Airport / Stockton University Shuttle
NJ	Absecon	Absecon	62.0 (99.8)	July 4, 1854 September 17, 1989		NJ Transit Bus: 508, 554, 559
NJ	Atlantic City	Atlantic City Rail Terminal	67.9 (109.3)	September 17, 1989		NJ Transit Bus: 319, 501, 502, 504, 505, 507, 508, 509, 551, 552, 553, 554, 559 (at AC Bus Terminal); Atlantic City Jitney: 1, 2, 3
