= Atlantic City Convention Center =

Convention center in Atlantic City, New Jersey, U.S.

- Interactive map of Atlantic City Convention Center
- Address: One Convention Boulevard
- Location: Atlantic City, New Jersey, U.S.
- Coordinates: 39.36340°N 74.43911°W
- Owner: Casino Reinvestment Development Authority
- Operator: OVG360
- Public transit: Atlantic City Rail Terminal

Construction
- Opened: May 1, 1997
- Cost: $268 million

Website
- https://www.accenter.com/

The Atlantic City Convention Center is a large convention center located in Atlantic City, New Jersey. Opened on May 1, 1997, the center includes 500,000 sq ft (46,000 m^{2}) of showroom space, 5 exhibit halls, 45 meeting rooms with 109,000 sq ft (10,100 m^{2}) of space, a garage with 1,400 parking spaces, and an adjacent Sheraton hotel.

== History ==
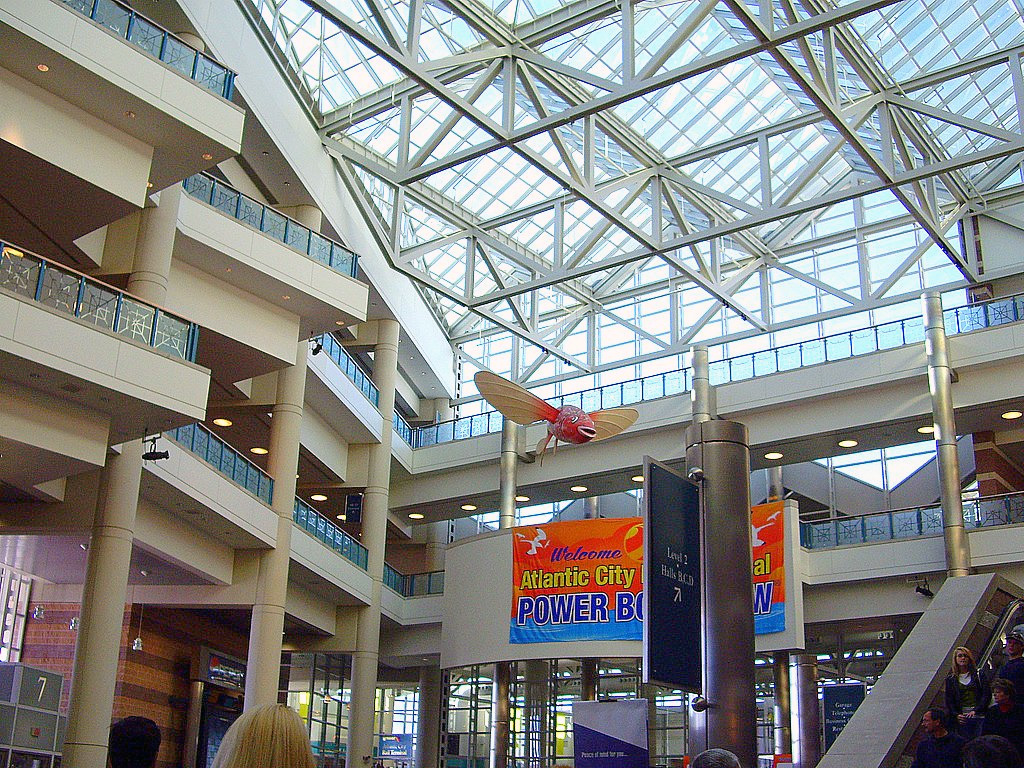
The Atlantic City Convention Center during the annual Power Boat Show

The Center was developed as a part of the city's gateway redevelopment project, which also included Tanger Outlets The Walk and the Grand Boulevard. The building opened with a connected Sheraton hotel.

The building was constructed in its original design by Philadelphia green city planning firm WRT (Wallace, Roberts and Todd) by its senior architect at the time, the principal, and partner, Gilbert Rosenthal, AIA, to reflect its location, featuring wave-inspired carpets and a Rock Bar themed to the beach. The main lobby is contained within an atrium lit by 90 ft. high skylights.

Between the convention center and the Sheraton Hotel is a landscaped garden with an interactive bronze statue of Bert Parks holding a crown. When a visitor puts their head inside the crown and taps it, sensors activate a recorded playback of Parks singing "There She Is..." through speakers hidden behind nearby bushes.

== Other facilities ==
The Center is connected to the Atlantic City Rail Terminal, containing New Jersey Transit's Atlantic City Line to Philadelphia.
