= Cherry Hill station (NJ Transit) =

Rail station in New Jersey, US

Cherry Hill
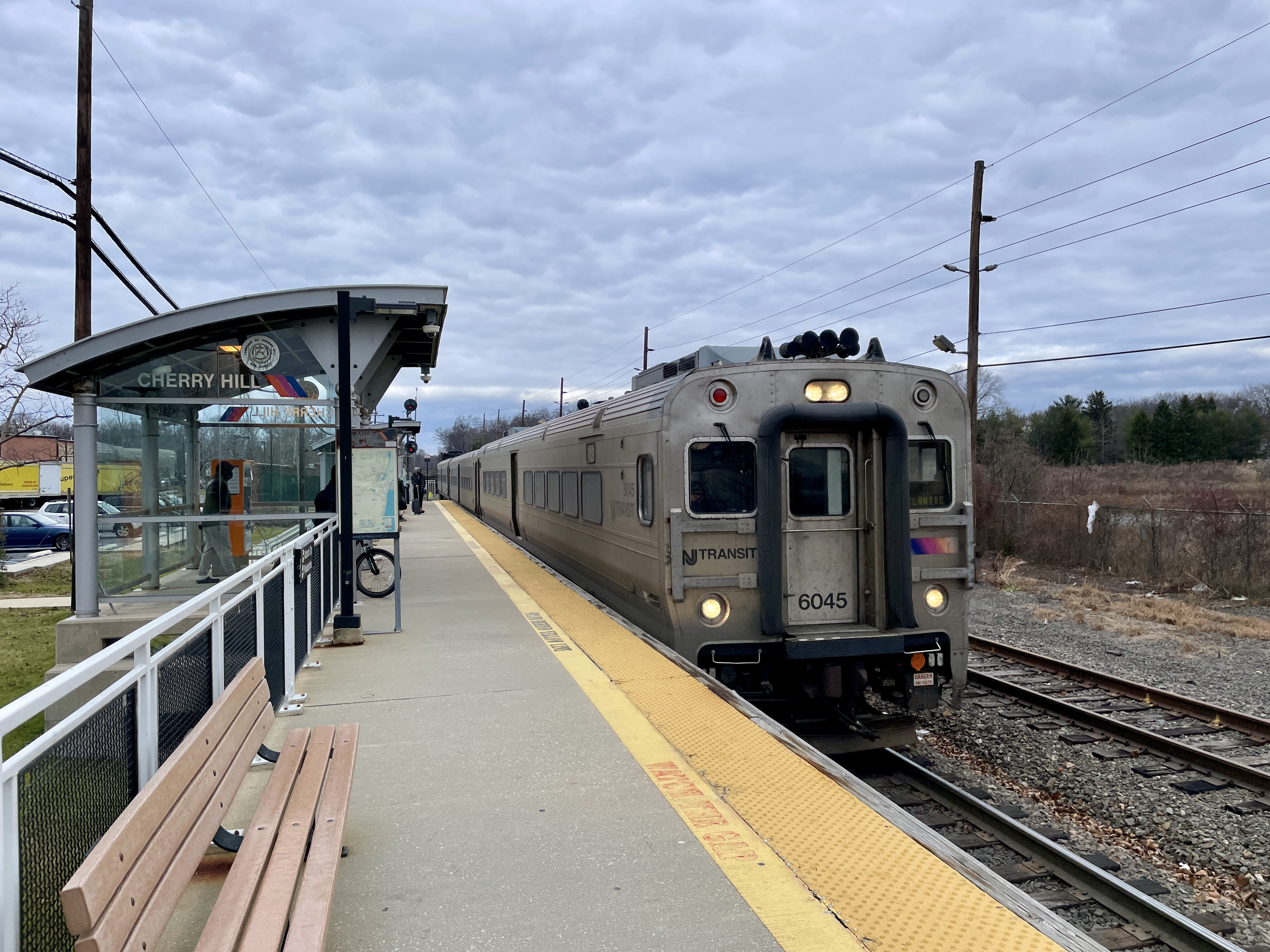
- Cherry Hill station in January 2024

General information
- Location: Marlton Pike West (NJ 70) and Cornell Avenue South; Cherry Hill, New Jersey
- Coordinates: 39°55′42″N 75°2′30″W
- Owner: New Jersey Transit
- Platforms: 1 side platform
- Tracks: 2
- Connections: NJ Transit Bus: 406, 450

Construction
- Parking: 352 spaces, 6 accessible spaces
- Accessible: Yes

Other information
- Station code: Amtrak: CRH

History
- Opened: July 2, 1994

Passengers
- 2025: 96 (average weekday)
- Rank: 119 of 153

Services
Preceding station	NJ Transit	Following station
Pennsauken toward Philadelphia	Atlantic City Line	Lindenwold toward Atlantic City
Former services
Preceding station	Amtrak	Following station
North Philadelphia toward Richmond Staples Mill Road, Harrisburg or Springfield	Atlantic City Express 1994–1995	Atlantic City Terminus
Location

Cherry Hill station is a NJ Transit train station in Cherry Hill, New Jersey, United States, on the Atlantic City Line. Eastbound service is offered to Atlantic City and Westbound service is offered to Philadelphia. The station runs through the former Garden State Racetrack property, currently occupied by two separate shopping centers. The station is accessible directly from Route 70 (Marlton Pike). There is also an NJT 450 bus connection at the station, and the 406 bus on Route 70.

Cherry Hill station opened on July 2, 1994. It replaced Lindenwold station as a stop on the Amtrak Atlantic City Express until the train's April 2, 1995 discontinuance.

Cherry Hill station is much less used than Woodcrest station on the PATCO Lindenwold Line, also in Cherry Hill.
