= List of NJ Transit bus routes (300–399) =

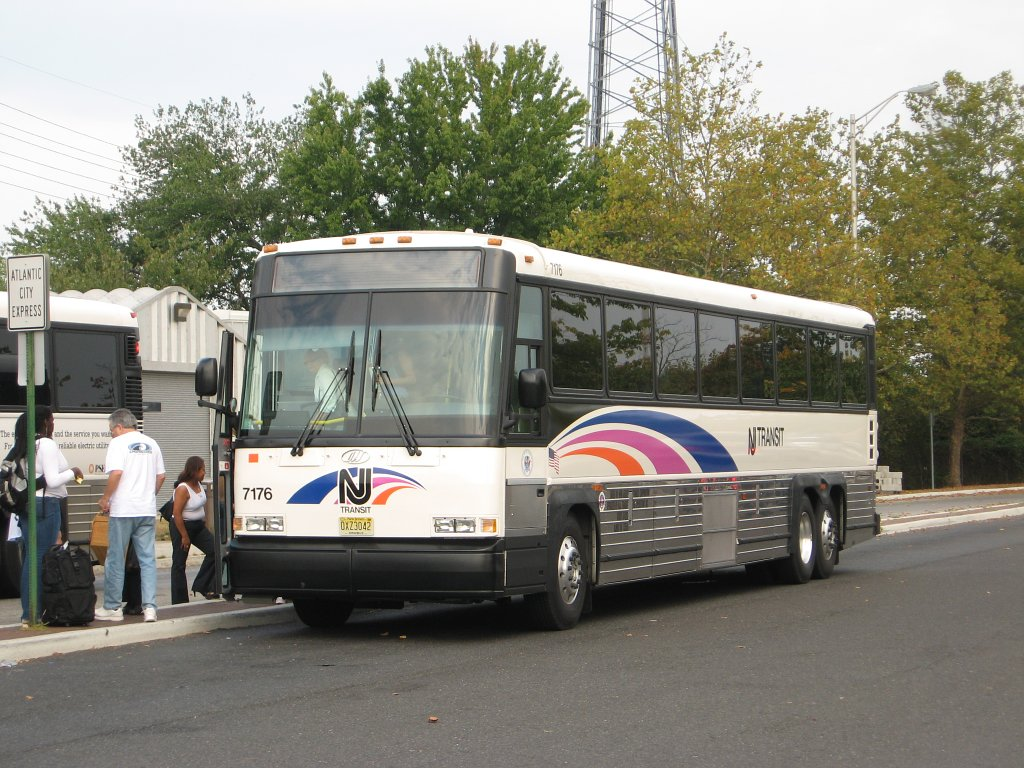
#7176 on the 319 in Toms River, New Jersey

New Jersey Transit operates the following bus routes, which are mostly focused on long-distance travel, special-event service, school trippers, or park-and-ride service.

== Routes ==
=== Northern Division ===
Assignments are noted in the table. The 351 and 353 are shared with Coach USA, and the 319 is listed in the Southern Division, from where most runs are based. All routes are express service. The full route is shown for each line except for branching.

Route	Terminals		Main routes of travel	Fare collection	Notes	Garage
320	Port Authority Bus Terminal	Secaucus; The Shops At Mill Creek	Harmon Meadow Boulevard	Full service	Formerly Route 200	Meadowlands
321	Port Authority Bus Terminal	Vince Lombardi Park & Ride	New Jersey Turnpike	Full service	Weekday Service Only	Meadowlands; Howell
324	Port Authority Bus Terminal	Wayne-Route 23 (full-time); Mothers Park-Ride (limited weekday service)	Route 3/46 express	Full service	Weekday Service Only; Weekend service provided by the 198.; Service to Wayne Route 23 Transit Center began on January 12, 2008.	Wayne
329	Secaucus Junction	Secaucus; Harmon Cove	Meadowlands Parkway via Secaucus Road/Castle Road/County Avenue (Morning Service); Meadowlands Parkway via Seaview Drive/Castle Road (Afternoon Service)	Full Service	Weekday Peak Hour service only; Originally 972. Began service as 329 on August 30, 2008.	Meadowlands
351	Port Authority Bus Terminal	Meadowlands Sports Complex	Route 3 express	Full Service	Only operates during events at MetLife Stadium only	Fairview; Meadowlands; Community Coach
353	Secaucus Junction	Meadowlands Sports Complex	Meadowlands Parkway (no intermediate stops)	Full Service	Operates during special events only	Fairview; Big Tree; Meadowlands; Ironbound
355	Port Authority Bus Terminal	American Dream Meadowlands	Route 3 Express (no intermediate stops)	Full Service	Bus route operating weekend express service from the Port Authority Bus Terminal (PABT) to the American Dream every 60 minutes.; Started on October 25, 2019, with the opening of the American Dream Mall, the Family SuperSaver Fare will NOT be in effect for Bus Route No. 355 customers. All customers must have a ticket to utilize Bus No. 355.	Meadowlands; Ironbound
356	Secaucus Junction	American Dream Meadowlands	Meadowlands Parkway (no intermediate stops)	Full Service	Bus Route No. 356 operates daily express service from Secaucus Junction to American Dream every 30 minutes.; Started on October 25, 2019, with the opening of the American Dream Mall, the Family SuperSaver Fare will be in effect for Bus No. 356 customers.; Route is temporarily suspended As of October 25, 2022	Ironbound
361	Newark-Ivy Hill	Newark Penn Station	Springfield Avenue, 18th Avenue (Rush Hours Only)	Exact Fare	Weekday Peak Hour Service Only (AM to Newark Penn Station, PM to Newark-Ivy Hill); Former 1X Newark Express, renumbered to 361 on April 3, 2010.	Hilton
364	Ridgewood High School or Van Neste Square	Hillcrest Rd & Morningside Rd	Morningside Rd & North Monroe St	Full Service	PM School tripper route; some trips start at GW Middle School, and others go via GW Middle School.; Signed as 163S	Oradell
372	Bloomfield Bloomfield Av & Ampere Pkwy	Bloomfield High School	Bloomfield Av	Exact Fare	AM School tripper route, towards the school only; Signed as "BLOOMFIELD HS"	Orange
375	Maplewood	Essex County Correctional Center; Newark Penn Station	Springfield Avenue, Wilson Avenue (Rush Hours Only)	Exact Fare	Weekday Peak Hour service only; Separated from Route 25 in 2010 (Formerly 25X Route)	Hilton
378	Newark Penn Station	UPS Drive, Secaucus	I-280, New Jersey Turnpike	Exact Fare	One early evening and one late evening round-trip during Weekdays only; Separated from Route 78 in 2010	Big Tree

=== Southern Division ===
These 300-series routes operate in southern New Jersey, primarily as long-distance local bus lines, along with the 319 Parkway Express. All lines are full-service lines with limited service. The 319 is shared with Meadowlands.

Route	Terminals		Main routes of travel	Express service (if applicable)	Notes	Garage
313	Philadelphia PPA Bus Terminal	Cape May	Routes 42, 55, and 47; New Jersey Avenue	Express from Philadelphia to Pitman (stops at WRTC)	Limited Service only; Service to the Rowan University campus began on January 4, 2003.	Egg Harbor; Washington Twp
315	Philadelphia PPA Bus Terminal	Cape May	Route 42; Black Horse Pike; Route 50; Landis Avenue; New Jersey Avenue	Express from Philadelphia to Washington Township garage (stops at WRTC)	Limited Service only	Egg Harbor; Washington Twp
316	Philadelphia 30th Street Station	Cape May	Route 42; Atlantic City Expressway; Garden State Parkway; New Jersey Avenue	Express from Philadelphia to North Wildwood (stops at WRTC, Gloucester, and Sicklerville)	Operates daily between first Saturday of Summer through Labor Day each year	Egg Harbor; Newton Ave; Washington Twp
317	Philadelphia PPA Bus Terminal	Asbury Park	Routes 38, 530, 528, 88, and 71		Former route 117	Newton Avenue
319 Express	Port Authority Bus Terminal, New York (full-time); Jersey City-Journal Square (limited service)	Atlantic City Bus Terminal, or Wildwood Bus Terminal and Cape May	Garden State Parkway	Express from New York to Sea Isle City (stops in Toms River, Atlantic City, and Ocean City) On most trips, change at Atlantic City for buses south to Wildwood and Cape May.: Formerly Route 119		Egg Harbor; Howell; Meadowlands
340	Philadelphia 30th Street	Atlantic City Bus Terminal		No express service	Special Service only during AC line maintenance.; Has destination signs for all Atlantic City Line stations.	Egg Harbor
343	Trenton	Burlington Town Center		No express service	Special Service only during River Line maintenance.	Newton Avenue
345	Any Destination if there is a PATCO shutdown	Any Destination if there is a PATCO shutdown		No express service	Special Service only during PATCO maintenance.	
346	Princeton Junction	Princeton		No express service	Special Service only during Princeton Dinky maintenance.	Hamilton Township Garage

== Former routes ==
This list includes routes that have been renumbered or are now operated by private companies.

Route	Terminals		Major streets	Current status
300	PABT	Newark Liberty International Airport North Area	New Jersey Turnpike	Route sold to Olympia Trails in 1997, operated by them as the Newark Airport Express.
301 (first use)	Atlantic City Bus Terminal	Atlantic City International Airport	Atlantic City Expressway	Discontinued in 1987 after People Express went out of business.; Alternate service available from Pleasantville via the South Jersey Transportation Authority.
301 (second use); 310 (first use)	PABT	Action Park	Interstate 80	Discontinued in 1997 (but last ran in 1996) when Action Park went out of business.; Service to successor Mountain Creek operated by extension of 194 line.; Was the 310 from 1978 to 1987.
302 "AirLink"	Newark-Broad St.	Newark Liberty International Airport	McCarter Highway	Discontinued when AirTrain Newark opened.; Was once privately operated using minibuses before NJT ran it.; Specific buses were assigned to the 302, which had an "AIRLINK" wrap around the bus.
303 (first use)	George Washington Bridge Bus Station	Newark Liberty International Airport	New Jersey Turnpike	This experimental route was canceled due to low ridership.; Also served Harmon Meadow.
303 (second use); 306 "The Loop"	Newark-Broad St.	Newark Penn Station	Broad Street	Originally the 303, this route was an Airlink short-turn within Newark.; Renumbered 306 "The Loop" when NJPAC opened.; Discontinued when the Newark Light Rail opened to Newark-Broad St.
303 (third use)	Wayne WM Paterson University	Mountain Creek		Seen on bus destination signs. Not much is known about this service.; Went via Wayne Transit Center
304 (first use)	Saddle Brook	Newark Liberty International Airport	New Jersey Turnpike	This experimental route was canceled due to low ridership.; Also served Harmon Meadow.
304 (second use)	PABT	Mountain Creek	Route 3 and Route 46	304 has been designated as 301 or 310 in the past, but it most recently ran as an extension of the 194 route.; Discontinued after the 2013/2014 season.; Now operates as a seasonal service carrying the 194 route number.
305	Liberty State Park; Park and Ride	Liberty State Park; Visitor Center	Audrey Zapp Drive; Freedom Way	Service was initiated in May 2000 to connect the Liberty State Park station with the rest of the park and the Liberty Science Center. Due to low ridership, NJ Transit suspended service in 2010 and later discontinued it entirely on May 31, 2010.
307 (first use)	PABT	McGuire Air Force Base	New Jersey Turnpike	Discontinued in 1998.
307 (second use) (seasonal service only)	Freehold Freehold Center	Six Flags Great Adventure	County Route 537	Ran summers only.; Service initiated on March 20, 2002.; Discontinued on September 1, 2015 due to budget cuts.
308 (seasonal service only)	PABT or Newark Penn Station	Six Flags Great Adventure	New Jersey Turnpike - Interstate 195	Ran summers only.; Discontinued in 2024.; Last ran October 2023 for Six Flags Fright Fest.
309 (first use)	Toms River	Island Beach State Park	NJ Route 37	Ran summers only.; Absorbed into the #137 schedule.
309 (second use)	Toms River	Six Flags Great Adventure	Interstate 195	Ran summers only.; Service initiated on March 20, 2002.; Discontinued in 2005.
310 (second use)	Trenton	Six Flags Great Adventure	Interstate 195	Ran summers only.; Service initiated on March 12, 2003.; Discontinued in 2005.
311	Asbury Park	Six Flags Great Adventure	Interstate 195	Ran during the summer only.; Service initiated in 2003.; Discontinued in 2005.
318 (seasonal service only)	Philadelphia Greyhound Terminal	Six Flags Great Adventure	I-295 and I-195	Ran during the summer only.; Discontinued on September 1, 2015 due to budget cuts.; Formerly the 71G, then 117G, and renumbered to 318.
319; Local	PABT	Atlantic City Bus Terminal	U.S. Route 9	Route split in Lakewood, and later on in the Amboys.; Now the #116, #139, and #559 lines.; The express service continues to carry the #319 designation.
322	PABT	Meadowlands Sports Complex Park & Ride	New Jersey Route 3	Route sold to Academy Bus, then subsequently discontinued.
323	PABT	PNC Bank Arts Center	Garden State Parkway	Route sold to Academy Bus. Service is provided to this park-ride on the Shore Points and Parkway Express lines.
330	Lincroft	Newark Penn Station	Garden State Parkway	Originally ran from Asbury Park, but was cut back to Lincroft. Route was then sold to Academy Bus, and then discontinued. Alternate service is available via the North Jersey Coast Line.
333	Red Bank	Newark Penn Station	Garden State Parkway	Route sold to Academy Bus, then discontinued. Alternate service available via the North Jersey Coast Line
350	PABT	Allentown, PA	Interstate 78, U.S. Route 22	Route sold to Trans-Bridge Lines. Previously operated by Transport of New Jersey as #150.
356 (first use)	Fort Lee	Port Imperial Ferry	River Road, Palisades Avenue, NJ 5, GWB Plaza	Introduced on September 1st, 1990, short-lived service.; Discontinued on January 5th, 1991.; Ran on weekdays only every hour to 40 minutes.; Counterpart to the 156
359	Fort Lee; Linwood Park	Port Imperial Ferry	Nungessers, Anderson Avenue, GWB Plaza	Introduced on September 1st, 1990, short-lived service.; Discontinued on January 5th, 1991.; Ran on weekdays only every 40 to 30 minutes.; Counterpart to the 159
365	Woodland Park	West Paterson	5th Avenue, Rosa Parks Blvd	Discontinued in 2016.; School tripper route
366	Totowa	Paterson	Main Street, Totowa Avenue, Market Street	Discontinued in 2016; School tripper route
373	Trenton	unknown destination		Seen on bus destination signs. Not much about this route is known.
380	North Bergen	Union City		Discontinued in 1998
397	Willowbrook Mall	Main Street	Main Street, Willowbrook Blvd	Discontinued in 2016.; Served Passaic Valley High School; School tripper route
