= Atlantic City Union Station =

Former railway station in Atlantic City, New Jersey (closed 1964)

Atlantic City
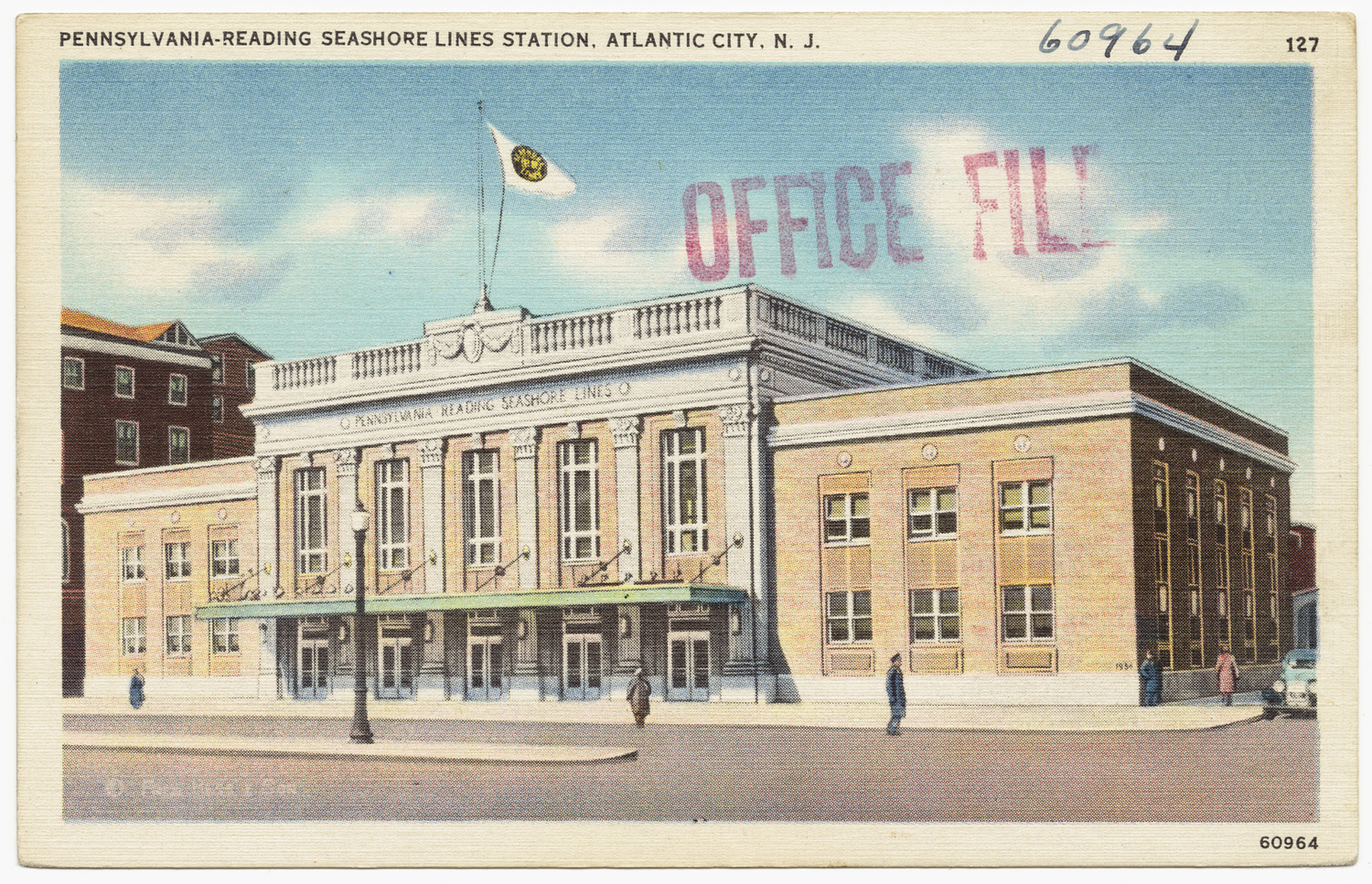
- Atlantic City Union Station in a 1930s-era postcard

General information
- Location: 2121-2125 Arctic Avenue; Atlantic City, New Jersey, U.S.
- Coordinates: 39.3598°N 74.4382°W
- Owner: Pennsylvania-Reading Seashore Lines
- Platforms: 5
- Tracks: 10

History
- Opened: 1934
- Closed: 1964 (bus terminal 1965-1997, demolished 1997)

Former services
Preceding station	Pennsylvania-Reading Seashore Lines	Following station
Absecon–Pleasantville toward Camden	WJ&S Main Line	Terminus
Preceding station	Central Railroad of New Jersey	Following station
Hammonton toward Winslow Junction	Southern Division – Atlantic City service	Terminus
Location

Atlantic City Union Station was an intercity passenger rail station located at 2121-2125 Arctic Avenue in Atlantic City, New Jersey. It was opened in 1934 by the Pennsylvania-Reading Seashore Lines (PRSL) and consolidated the operations of the two previously competing rail lines. In 1964, construction of the Atlantic City Expressway severed the rail connection to the station. It was then renovated and became the Atlantic City Municipal Bus Terminal while rail service was relocated north to a more modest building on Bacharach Boulevard. It served as a bus terminal until 1997 when it was demolished. The former station site is now occupied by a retail outlet mall.

== Background and construction ==
Prior to the formation of the PRSL the Pennsylvania Railroad (PRR) and the Reading Railroad (RDG) operated competing rail lines to Atlantic City. The PRR controlled the West Jersey and Seashore line and had a depot at Arctic and South Carolina Avenues. The RDG controlled the Atlantic City Railroad with their depot at Atlantic and North Arkansas Avenues. By the 1930s however the drop in freight revenue, and the seasonal nature of a beach resort, led the two lines to merge their operations in southern New Jersey and form the PRSL in 1933.

The building design is attributed to architect David A. Rosenstein, although the original plans have been lost. He employed a "modified classic" style that combined both classic and art deco details. Construction began in 1933. The main waiting room formed the center of the building: two stories in height, 78 by 72 feet (24 by 22 m), with a coffered ceiling, terazzo floor, a "...glazed decorative terracotta frieze surrounding the room at the top of the first story level...with plain stepped plaster pilasters reaching to the ceiling above. The space is bright, airy, and pleasant; the high ceiling provides a feeling of spaciousness..." The waiting room was entered from Arctic or Arkansas avenues. Passenger services were all located on the first floor: ticket office, parcel room, telegraph desk, payphones, restrooms, lunch counter and newsstand. The second floor was used by railroad employees. The boarding area had five platforms that extended back 1,400 feet (430 m) with the first 600 feet (180 m) covered.

As the resort grew and flourished in the 19th century the tracks of the two companies had created at least a dozen grade crossings and dead-end streets. The removal of the tracks from the PRR's former right of way opened these up and created a new road: Bacharach Boulevard, named for Harry Bacharach, a former Atlantic City mayor.

== Rail service years ==
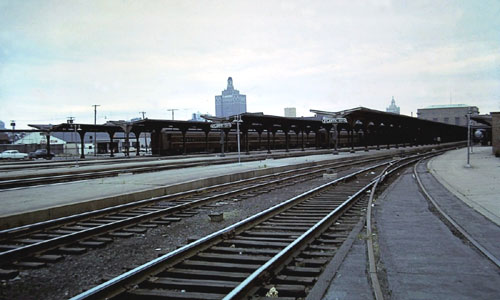
Station platforms in 1964

PRSL trains began operating in Atlantic City Union Station on 30 September 1934. The PRR's Nellie Bly provided direct service from New York until 1961. The Central Railroad of New Jersey used Union Station for its famed Blue Comet train which ran until 1941. The tracks and platforms of the station can be seen in home movie footage taken in June 1937. Locomotives and cars from manufacturers throughout the US were on display during a week-long trade show for rail executives. Union Station accommodated this extra activity all while normal summertime passenger traffic went in and out.

The Shore Fast Line of Monopoly board fame, an interurban rail line between Ocean City and Atlantic City, also used Union Station until it shut down in 1948. The last PRSL public timetable to list Union Station as its destination was published in October 1964.

As construction of the Expressway approached the city in 1964, a new PRSL station was built at 2100 Bacharach Boulevard. Passengers that had previously arrived at the spacious, airy Union Station on a busy street now encountered a modest one-story building located in what was then an industrial pocket between the electrical generating station and a gas tank farm. The April 1965 the PRSL timetable has this station as its Atlantic City destination. All train service to Atlantic City used the 1964 station until New Jersey Transit and Conrail, the eventual successor to the PRSL, eliminated service in 1981. (The 1964 station appears briefly in the 1972 film The King of Marvin Gardens.) Rail service would not be restored until 1989 when Amtrak began service to the new Atlantic City Rail Terminal.

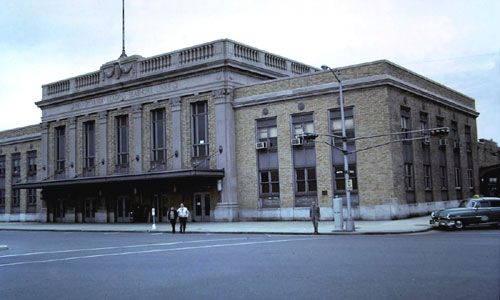
The station in 1964

== Bus terminal conversion ==
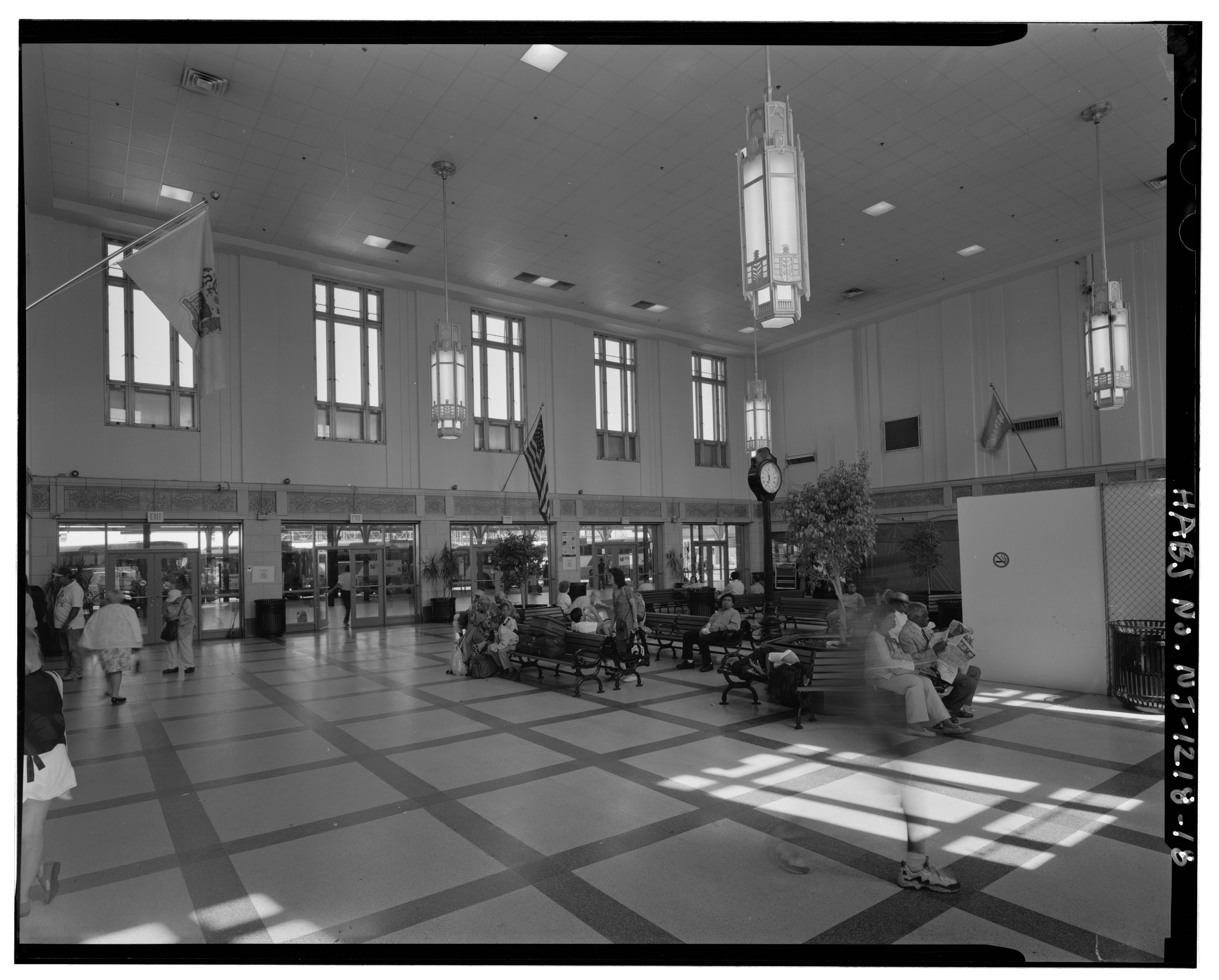
Main waiting room in 1995

According to the Historic American Buildings Survey there were little or no changes made to the building until 1965. In late 1964 construction of the Atlantic City Expressway severed the rail connection to Union Station. The Ballinger Company of Philadelphia was commissioned to convert the building to a bus terminal. The platforms were modified to accommodate buses and a new metal sign reading "ATLANTIC CITY MUNICIPAL BUS TERMINAL" covered over "PENNSYLVANIA READING SEASHORE LINES". Some windows were covered over with asbestos board, waiting room benches were removed, and the ticket counter replaced along with changes made to the entrances. Buses which had been using the old Shore Fast Line terminal since 1948 were now relocated to the new Municipal Bus Terminal.
In the 1990s a comprehensive renovation of the terminal was begun but halted midway when the decision was made to demolish the building as part of the Atlantic City Gateway Corridor Roadway Improvements. Bus services were relocated to a new Atlantic City Bus Terminal and the building was demolished in 1997.

Before its closure and demolition the buildings' architecture was documented by the Historic American Buildings Survey. It was added to the New Jersey Register of Historic Places in 1994.
