= List of NJ Transit bus routes (500–549) =

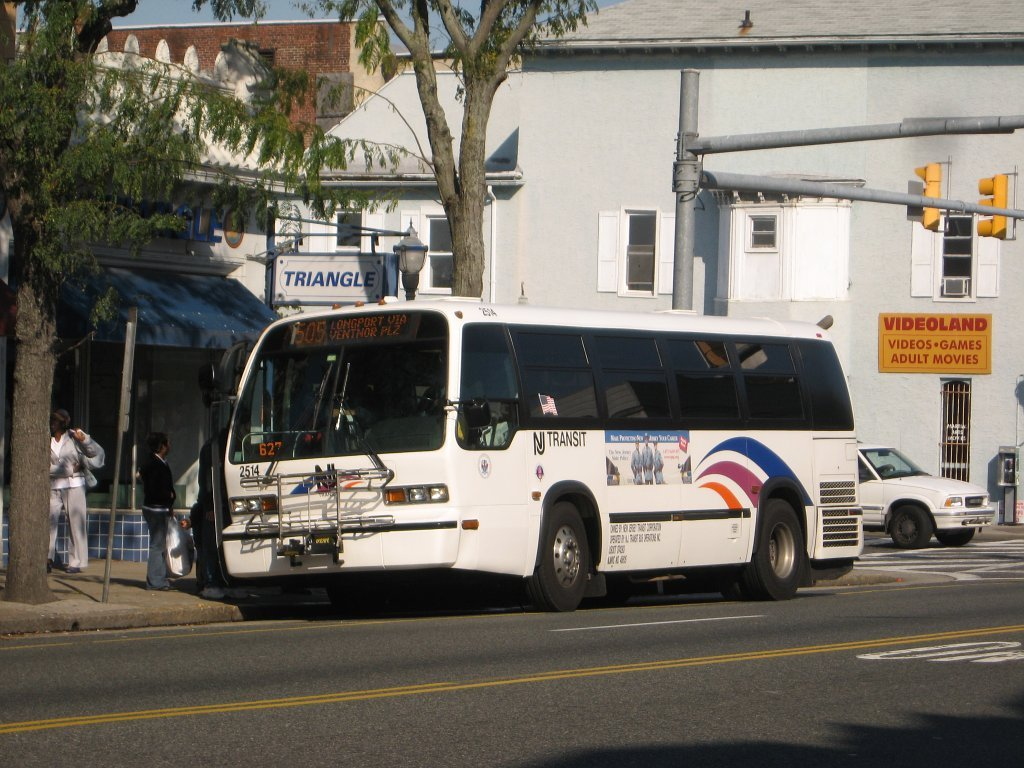
#2514 on the 505 along Atlantic Avenue in Atlantic City.

New Jersey Transit operates the following local bus routes within Atlantic County, centered on Atlantic City that were once operated by Atlantic City Transportation Company. All of these routes are exact fare lines (except for 510) and are operated out of the Egg Harbor garage.

== Routes ==
The full route is shown below except for branching. School routes are not listed.

Route	Terminal A	Main streets of travel	Terminal B	Notes	Garage
501	Atlantic City Bus Terminal	Atlantic Avenue; Brigantine Boulevard; Brigantine Avenue	Brigantine; End of Brigantine Avenue	24-hour service; Serves Marina District Casinos Golden Nugget Atlantic City, Harrah's Atlantic City, and Borgata; Formerly Route A1	Egg Harbor
502	Atlantic City; North Carolina Avenue	Atlantic Avenue; Black Horse Pike	Atlantic Cape Community College	Sunday service ends at Hamilton Mall in Mays Landing and does not serve Atlantic Cape.; Formerly Route A2	Egg Harbor
504	Atlantic City; Brigantine Boulevard	Adriatic and Caspian Avenues; Baltic and Arctic Avenues; West End Avenue	Margate	Formerly Route A4; Route extended from Ventnor Plaza to Margate City on April 1, 2023.	Egg Harbor
505	Atlantic City: Venice Park or; Gardiner's Inlet	Atlantic Avenue; Ventnor Avenue	Longport; South 15 Avenue	24-hour service; Select service travels via Ventnor Plaza.; More frequent service to Venice Park.; Formerly Route A5	Egg Harbor
507	Atlantic City; North Carolina Avenue	Atlantic Avenue; Shore Road	Ocean City Bus Terminal	24-hour service; Formerly Route A7	Egg Harbor
508	Atlantic City; North Carolina Avenue	Black Horse Pike; Shore Road; Jimmie Leeds Road; Pomona Road	Hamilton Mall	Formerly Route A8	Egg Harbor
509	Atlantic City; North Carolina Avenue	Atlantic Avenue; New Road; Somers-Mays Landing Road	Somers Point; Holly Hill Drive	Extended to Ocean City during off-peak hours. These trips also operate via the Black Horse Pike instead of the Atlantic City Expressway.; Formerly Route A9	Egg Harbor
510	Wildwood; Wildwood Bus Terminal	Wildwood Boulevard	Rio Grande	Summer service only; Full Service; Former 316 Local service between Wildwood and Cape May, split in 2011.; Rerouted to operate via Route 9 in 2016.; Section between Rio Grande and Cape May eliminated in 2017	Egg Harbor

== Former routes ==
In the past, New Jersey Transit ran shuttle routes running from the Atlantic City Rail Terminal to casinos in Atlantic City, numbered 506 and 510–513, connecting Atlantic City Line customers to casino destinations. All of these routes except for the 503 and 507X are now operated by the Atlantic City Jitney Association using either jitneys or dedicated minibuses. (Note: Destinations indicated in chart below reflect names of casinos at the time of the ACJA takeover in the mid-1990s.)

Route number	Route name	Destinations Served (Note: Current casino names in parentheses)	Notes
503	Atlantic City Seasonal (School)	Ventnor; Chelsea Heights; Margate	Discontinued
506	Marina Shuttle	Trump Castle (Golden Nugget); Harrah's Marina (Harrah's Atlantic City)	Replaced by ACJA Shuttle #4/Marina
507X	Ocean City Bus Terminal Express	Garden State Parkway; Shore Road	Discontinued; Formerly route A7X
510 (first use)	Brighton Park Shuttle	Bally's Park Place; Claridge; Sands (since demolished)	Replaced by ACJA Shuttle #2/Midtown
511	Uptown Shuttle	Resorts; Trump Taj Mahal (Hard Rock); Showboat (now closed); Atlantic County Office Complex; City Hall	Replaced by ACJA Shuttle #3/Uptown
512	Midtown Shuttle	Trump Plaza (now closed); Convention Hall (Boardwalk Hall); Caesars Boardwalk (Caesars Atlantic City)	Replaced by ACJA Shuttle #1/Downtown
513	Downtown Shuttle	TropWorld (Tropicana); Bally's Grand (Atlantic Club Casino [now closed])	Replaced by ACJA Shuttle #1/Downtown

== See also ==
- Atlantic City Jitney Association - a provider of local bus service solely within Atlantic City
