= Atlantic City Rail Terminal =

NJ Transit rail station

Atlantic City
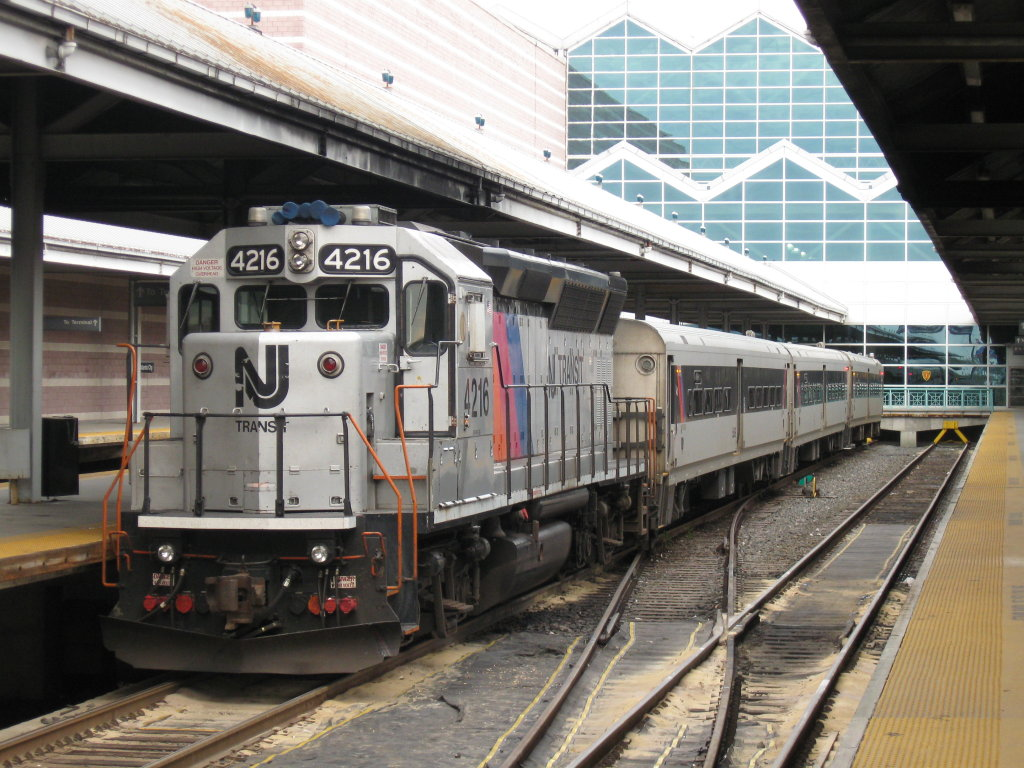
- New Jersey Transit train waits on Track 3 of the Atlantic City Rail Terminal

General information
- Location: 1 Atlantic City Expressway; Atlantic City, New Jersey
- Coordinates: 39.3635°N 74.442°W
- Owner: NJ Transit
- Platforms: 2 island platforms, 1 side platform
- Tracks: 5
- Connections: Atlantic City Jitney Association: 4 (Orange), 1, 2, 3

Construction
- Parking: Yes
- Cycle facilities: Yes
- Accessible: Yes

Other information
- Station code: Amtrak: ACY
- IATA code: ZRA

History
- Opened: May 23, 1989 (Amtrak); September 17, 1989 (NJ Transit)

Passengers
- 2025: 446 (average weekday)
- Rank: 64 of 153

Services
Preceding station	NJ Transit	Following station
Absecon toward Philadelphia	Atlantic City Line	Terminus
Former services
Preceding station	NJ Transit	Following station
Terminus	ACES 2009–2011	Newark Penn toward New York
Preceding station	Amtrak	Following station
Cherry Hill toward Richmond Staples Mill Road, Harrisburg or Springfield	Atlantic City Express	Terminus
Location

The Atlantic City Rail Terminal is a train station in Atlantic City, New Jersey, located inside of the Atlantic City Convention Center. It has five tracks served by three platforms, and functions as the easternmost terminus of the NJ Transit Atlantic City Line to and from Philadelphia. The terminal was designed by TAT/SSVK, Architects and dedicated on May 22, 1989.

From 1989 to 1995, the station served as the terminus of Amtrak's Atlantic City Express. The line was also marketed as the "Gambler's Express"; in this period, Atlantic City was practically the only location that people could legally gamble at on the East Coast of the United States. Later, the station was served by the Atlantic City Express Service (ACES) from New York City to Atlantic City. The ACES service was operational from 2009 to March 9, 2012.

Atlantic City was once served by the old Pennsylvania-Reading Seashore Lines (PRSL) Atlantic City station (originally Atlantic City Union Station), which had become Atlantic City Municipal Bus Terminal, demolished in 1997. Between 1965 and 1981 a single-story, two-track station on the present site served PRSL trains until service ended in 1981.

== Connecting service ==
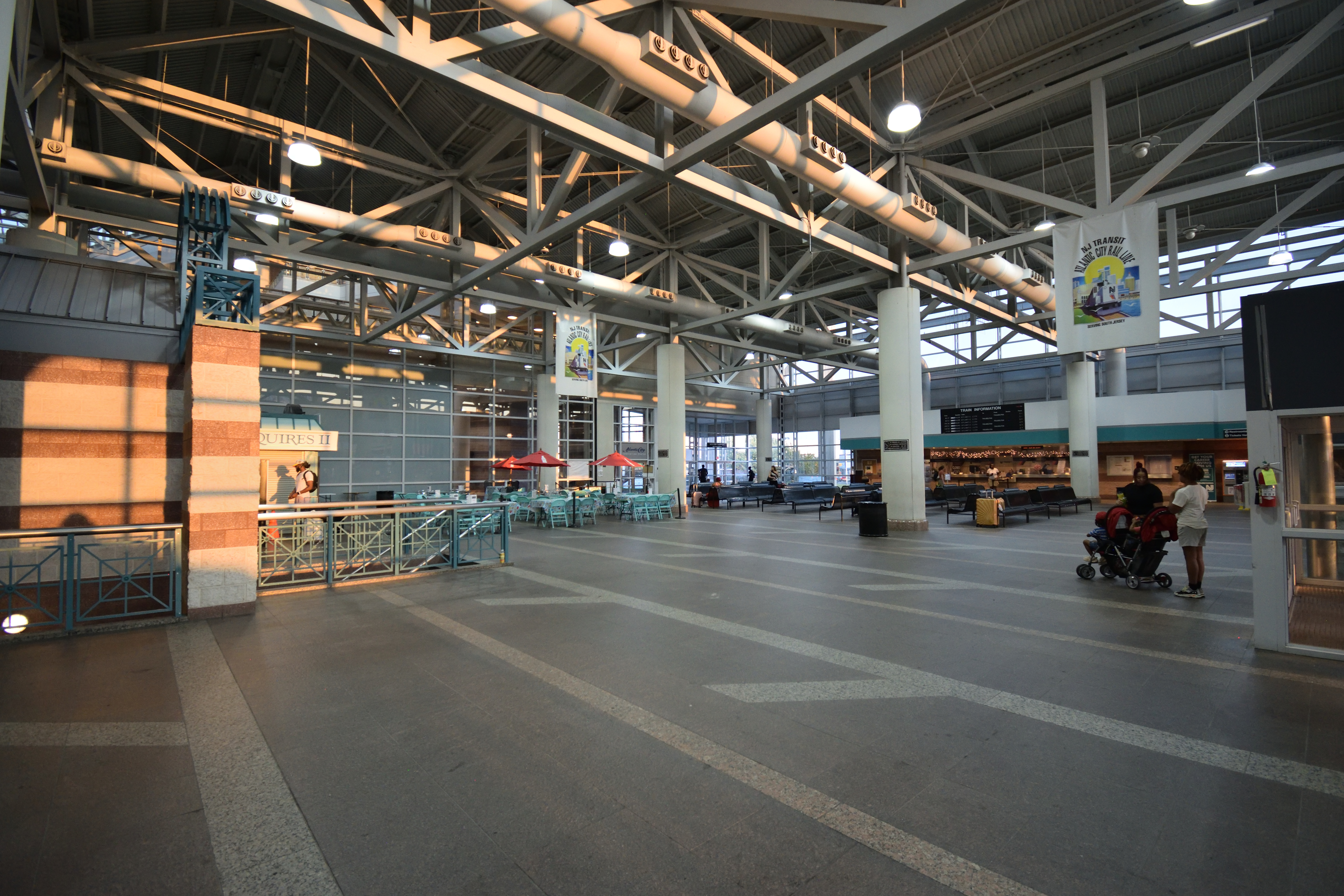
The waiting area of the Atlantic City Rail Terminal

- At the station/convention center: Atlantic City Jitney casino shuttles and route 4
- Two blocks south at the Atlantic City Bus Terminal: 319 to New York City and all Atlantic County local and long-distance routes.
