= Atlantic City Express (Amtrak train) =

Former Amtrak rail service

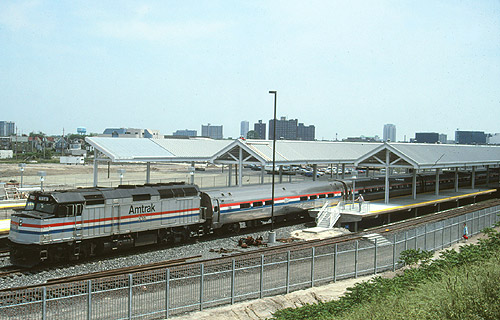
- An Atlantic City Express train at Atlantic City in 1989

Overview
- Service type: Inter-city rail
- Status: Discontinued
- Locale: New Jersey, New York City
- Predecessor: Nellie Bly
- First service: May 23, 1989
- Last service: April 1, 1995
- Successor: Atlantic City Line, Atlantic City Express Service
- Former operator: Amtrak

Route
- Termini: Richmond, Harrisburg, Springfield; Atlantic City
- Train number: 653, 654, 660-668, 670, 682, 685, 693, 696

On-board services
- Class: Reserved coach
- Disabled access: Yes
- Catering facilities: On-board cafe
- Baggage facilities: Luggage racks

Technical
- Rolling stock: EMD F40PH; Amfleet I coaches
- Electrification: 25 Hz, 12kV along NEC
- Track owners: Amtrak, NJ Transit

The Atlantic City Express was an Amtrak train that ran from Harrisburg, New York City, Richmond, Springfield and Washington, D.C. to Atlantic City, New Jersey, in the Northeastern United States. The train operated on the Northeast Corridor to 30th Street Station in Philadelphia, Pennsylvania, where it went east to Atlantic City.

== History ==
The new service started service in May 1989, after Amtrak spent extra Northeast Corridor improvement funds to rehabilitate the 60.3 mile long Atlantic City Line from Philadelphia to Atlantic City. The train was designed to provide service to gamblers and vacationers. The train made a single local stop on the Atlantic City Line. Amtrak completely renovated the Lindenwold Station and it served as a stop until July 1994, when the local stop was changed to the new Cherry Hill station due to low ridership at Lindenwold.

Amtrak also operated some through services from Atlantic City to Richmond, Virginia and Harrisburg, Pennsylvania. In June 1990, Amtrak entered into a partnership with Midway Airlines to operate trains from Philadelphia International Airport to Atlantic City via SEPTA. However, the service was short-lived, as Midway Airlines went bankrupt in the summer of 1991.

The Amtrak service to Atlantic City never hit its expected ridership levels. In another effort to gain more riders, service was extended to Springfield, Massachusetts and New Haven, Connecticut. Even then, most passengers traveled between New York and Philadelphia rather than continue on to Atlantic City. Amtrak also had to compete with a number of bus lines offering discounted rates at casinos. Although the trains were moderately successful, Amtrak still deemed that the poor showing of riders was not enough to warrant train service, and plans were made to discontinue the line. All Amtrak service to Atlantic City was discontinued after April 1, 1995. The following day, New Jersey Transit extended all Atlantic City Line trains to Philadelphia; previously, only a select few had run west of Lindenwold.

=== Atlantic City Express Service ===
A successor to the former Amtrak service, Atlantic City Express Service (ACES), began a weekend express train from New York Penn Station to Atlantic City on February 6, 2009. The service was sponsored by several casinos, run by New Jersey Transit over the Northeast Corridor and Atlantic City Lines, with a stop in Newark. The last train ran in September 2011, with the train formally discontinued in 2012.
