= Tanger Outlets Atlantic City =

Coordinates: 39.361°N 74.437°W

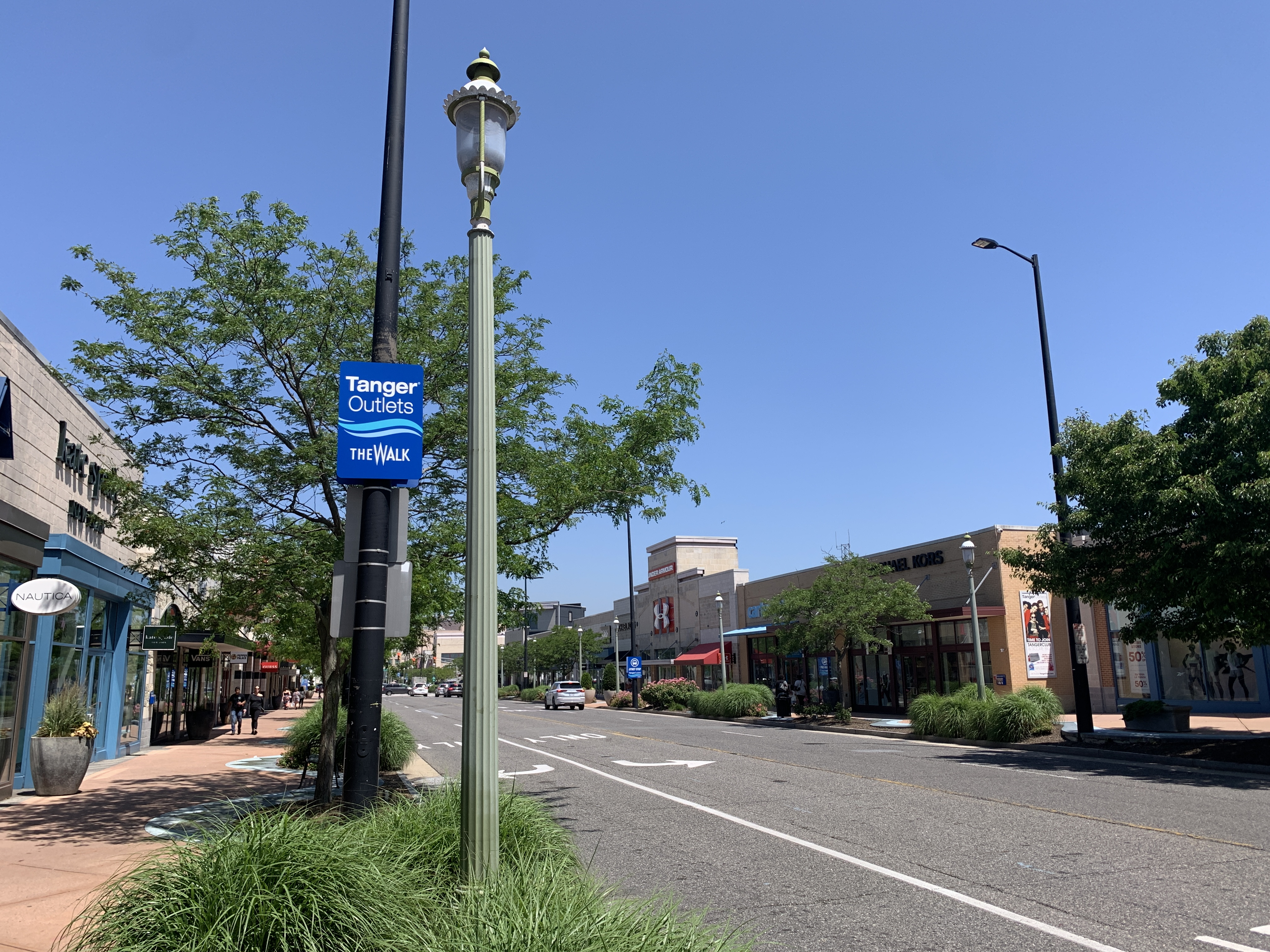
- Location: 1931 Atlantic Avenue, Atlantic City, New Jersey, United States
- Opened: August 2003
- Developer: The Cordish Cos.
- Manager: The Cordish Cos.
- Owner: Tanger Outlets (Phase I & II); Cordish Cos. (Phase III & IV)
- Num. of stores: 109
- Num. of anchor tenants: 9
- Floor area: 1,292,611 square feet (120,087.5 m^{2})
- Parking: Parking lot
- Public transit: NJ Transit bus: 319, 501, 502, 504, 505, 507, 508, 509, 551, 552, 553, 554, 559
- Website: www.acoutlets.com

Tanger Outlets Atlantic City, formerly known as The Walk, is a 109-store open-air outlet mall in Atlantic City, New Jersey. It is the only outlet mall in Atlantic County. The mall opened in August 2003 and spans 3 city blocks, featuring a unique layout in outlet mall construction.

== History ==
The outlet mall, which is owned by Tanger Inc, spans nine city blocks at the intersections of Atlantic Avenue, Arctic, Baltic, Michigan and Arkansas Avenues. The original phase of the complex was built on the site of the Atlantic City Bus Terminal, where the original station became a Polo Ralph Lauren outlet and the new bus terminal was surrounded by the mall. The center's first two expansions are part of what was originally called the "Corridor Project", which built new lighting, roadways, parkland, and a faux lighthouse along the entrance to Atlantic City in the early 2000s. The lighthouse was torn down in 2006 to make way for Phase II which included a large Nike outlet and other stores that are located in the divider island of Missouri and Arkansas Avenue.

In 2011, a controlling interest in Phase I and II of The Walk was sold as part of a $200 million, two-property sale to Tanger Inc. A document filed with the U.S. Securities and Exchange Commission said Tanger Properties Limited Partnership agreed to acquire "substantially all of the economic interests" in two outlet properties from Cordish Co. entities, which includes The Walk and another Cordish property in Ocean City, Maryland. Cordish Co. will remain the owner of Phase III until October, and will keep the right to develop Phase IV.

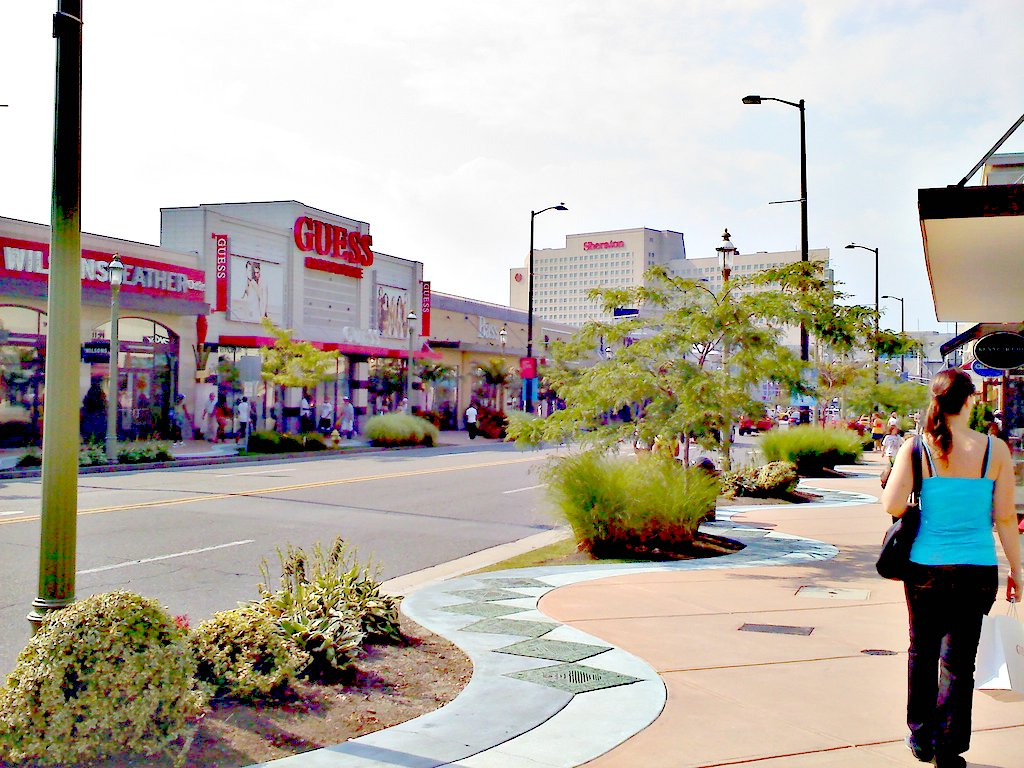
Shops along Michigan Avenue

== Phase III and IV ==
In 2013, the outdoor mall completed an expansion to extend the complex across Missouri Avenue. The $15 million addition added 9 new stores and opened in April 2011 with the opening of a Hanes outlet. Adjacent to the expansion will be a new garage called Wave to serve customers of Tanger Outlets The Walk and patrons of the Atlantic City Convention Center. The project received funding from and was built by the Casino Reinvestment Development Authority. The Wave garage opened in February 2012 and includes street-front stores facing Mississippi Avenue. The parking garage was expanded to include the Noyes Arts Garage in 2013, a spinoff of the Noyes Museum and Stockton College, that included both a mall-area for local artists to sell their wares as well as the African American Heritage Museum of Southern New Jersey.

Phase IV of the project was initially called "Atlantic City Live!" and featured a mix of restaurants, live entertainment, bars and nightclubs. The original planned Phase IV expansion would have been based on the Cordish Company's other projects bearing a "-Live!" suffix, such as Kansas City Live! and Power Plant Live!. The vacant Sun National Bank building on Atlantic and Arkansas Avenues was expected to be incorporated into the outlet district as a restaurant. Eventually, Cordish declared that a different and less ambitious Phase IV had been completed in 2015, and that no further phases were planned. The opening of a Bass Pro Shops store between Arctic and Atlantic Avenues along Mississippi Avenue was declared to have been the new phase 4.
