= Atlantic City Bus Terminal =

Coordinates: 39.359912°N 74.434929°W

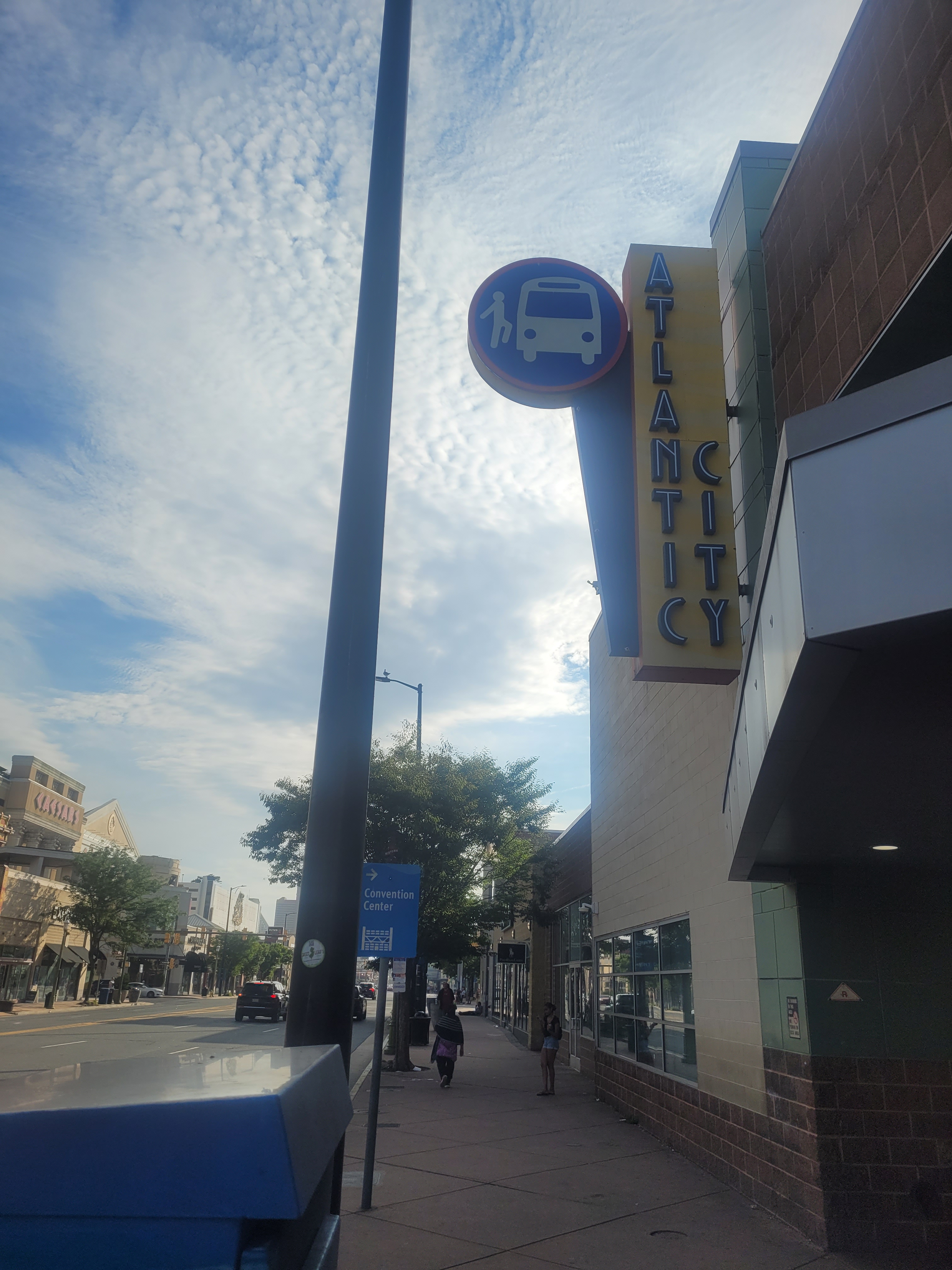
Atlantic Avenue entrance to the terminal, July 2024

The Atlantic City Bus Terminal is a regional bus station and a major stop for New Jersey Transit buses in Atlantic City, New Jersey. Located at the 1900 block of Atlantic Avenue, the station is now only half its original size, as part of it was carved out for a Polo Ralph Lauren store along the Atlantic City Outlets The Walk. The terminal contains vending machines, restrooms, a seating area, and ticket offices for New Jersey Transit. Opened in 1997, the bus terminal replaced the Atlantic City Union Station where buses have been stopping since 1964, which then ceased usage of passenger trains. The old Union Station was demolished in 1997 when the bus terminal was opened. Until late October 2022, Greyhound Bus Lines also served the terminal. The Atlantic City Convention Center and Rail Terminal is located three blocks away.

== Destinations ==
=== New Jersey Transit ===
- 319 to Toms River and New York City, or Wildwood and Cape May via the Garden State Parkway
- 501 to Brigantine
- 502 to Harbor Square, Consumer Square, Atlantic City Cape Community College (Mays Landing)
- 504 to Chelsea Heights, Margate, Ventnor City
- 505 to Ventnor City, Margate, Longport
- 507 to Ocean City
- 509 to Somers Point, Ocean City
- 551 to Sicklerville, Camden and Philadelphia via the Atlantic City Expressway
- 552 to Cape May Court House, Wildwood, and Cape May via the Garden State Parkway
- 553 to Vineland and Bridgeton via Mays Landing
- 554 to Lindenwold via the White Horse Pike
- 559 to Lakewood via Route 9

== Gallery ==
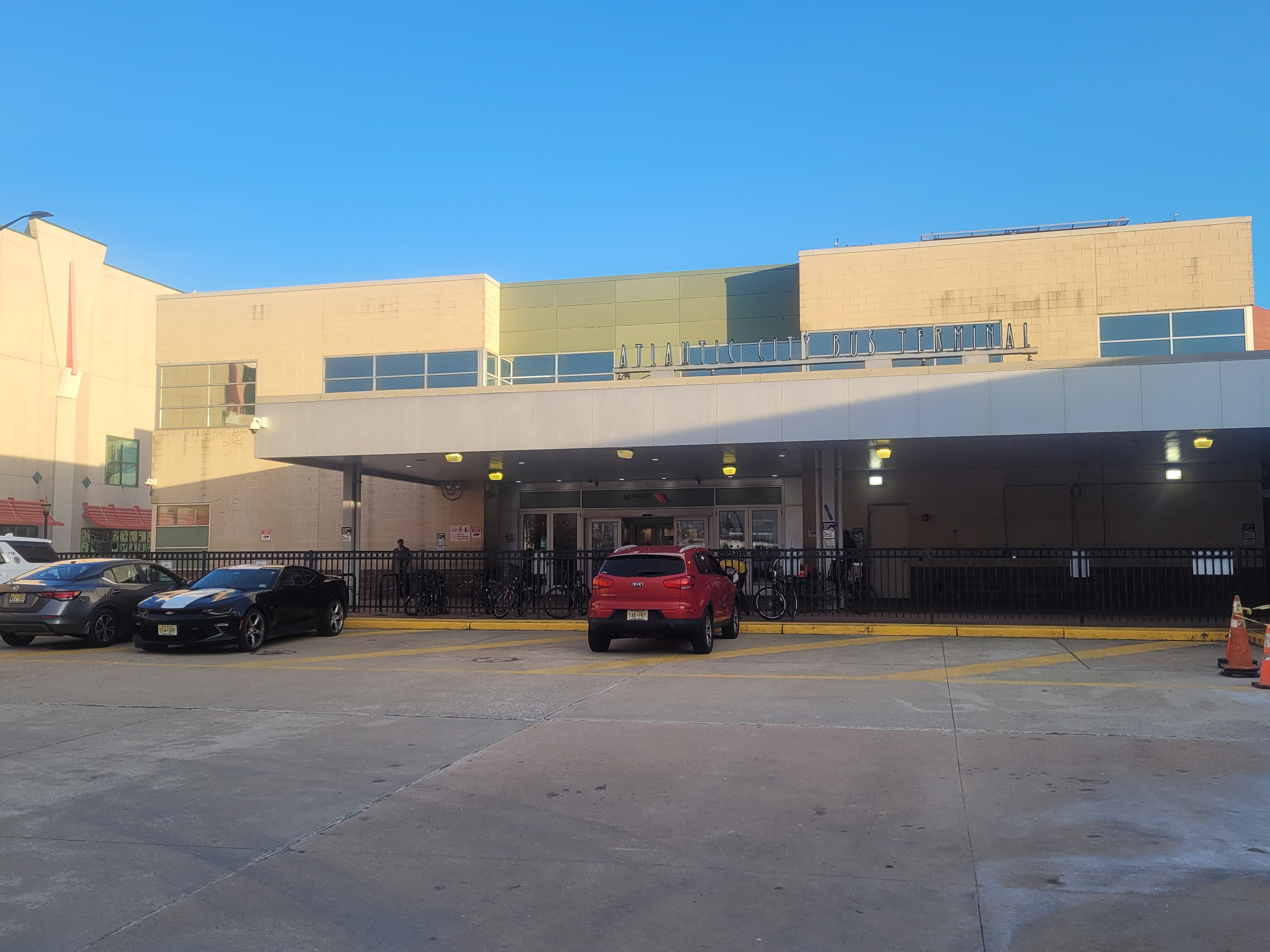
Back entrance of the bus terminal, March 2024

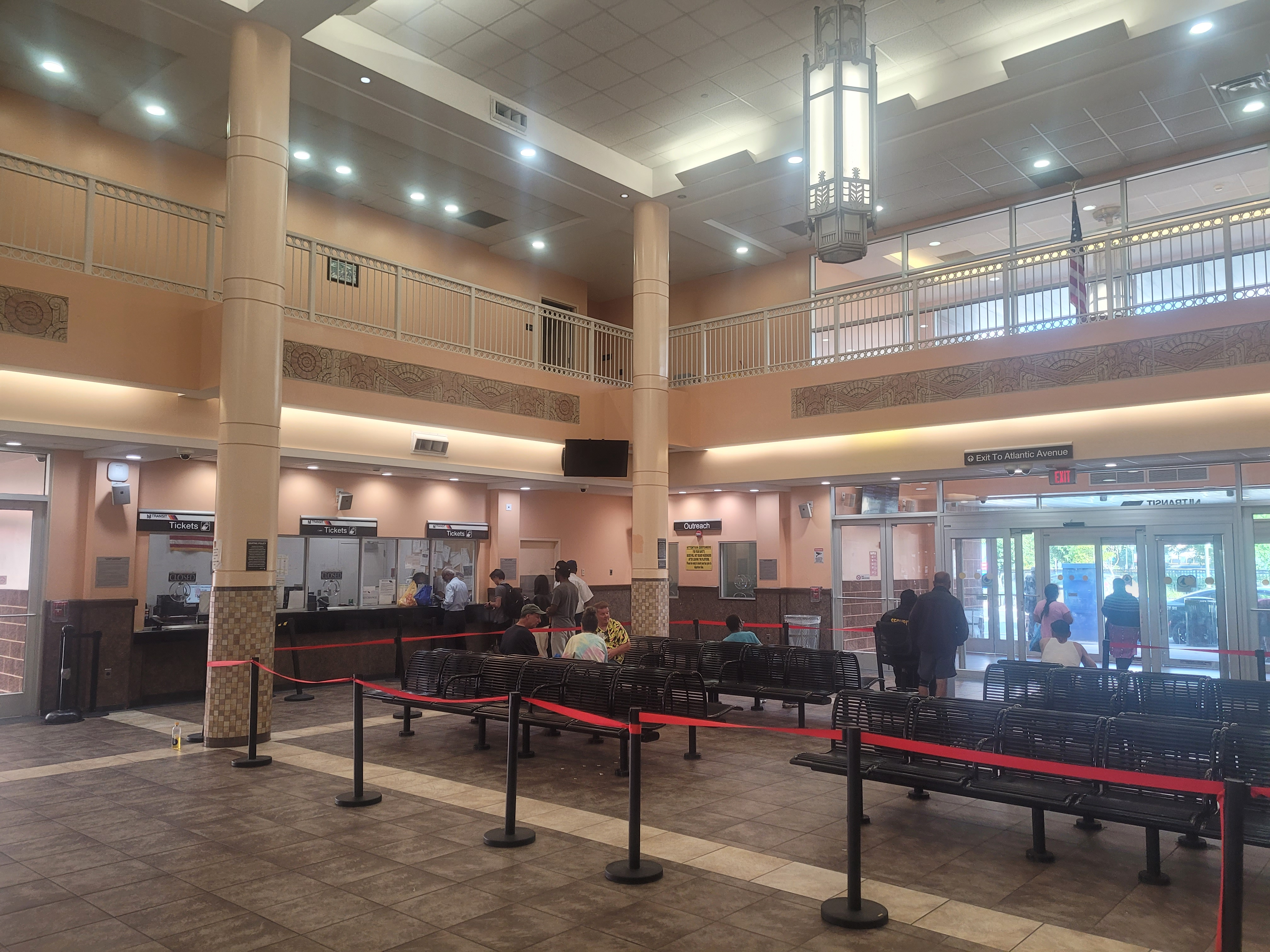
Interior of the terminal, July 2024

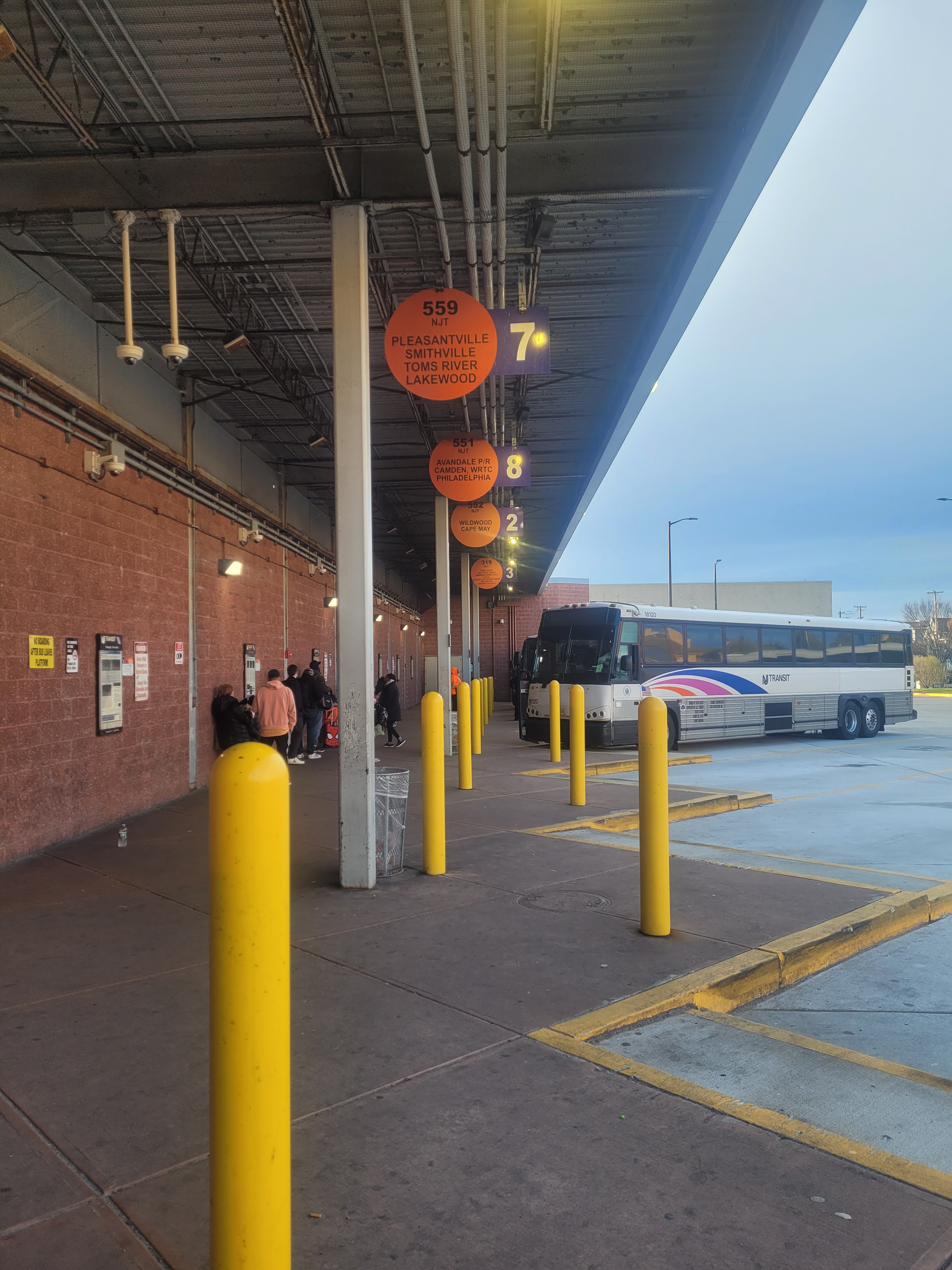
Bus gates where passengers wait to board, March 2024
