= List of NJ Transit bus routes (550–599) =

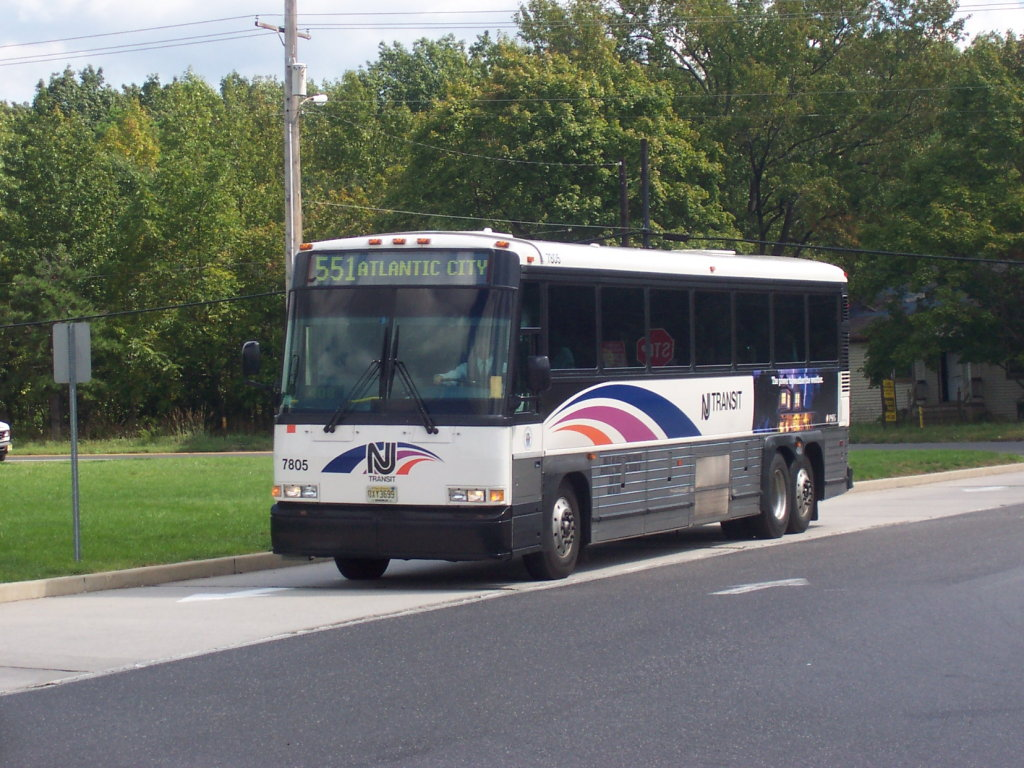
#7805 on the 551 line.

New Jersey Transit operates the following routes from Atlantic City, originating from the Atlantic City Bus Terminal, to points elsewhere in southern New Jersey. Most services run on the Atlantic City Expressway for some distance, and is noted below. All of these bus routes are full service routes.

These routes run 24 hours a day. (except 555)

== Routes ==
Below shown is the full route. Some trips may only serve a portion of the route. All routes, except for 555, originate from the Atlantic City Bus Terminal.

Route	Terminal	Main routes of travel (local service)	Garage	Notes
551	Philadelphia	Atlantic City Expressway; Route 42	Washington Township	4 stops only: Farley Service Plaza in Hamilton Twp. (limited service, for shift changes); Avandale Park-Ride in Sicklerville; Gloucester Premium Outlets in Blackwood (Limited Service); Walter Rand Transportation Center in Camden; Extended to Gloucester Premium Outlets on September 6, 2016.; Trips only between Avandale Park-Ride and Philadelphia split off as the 555 on January 14, 2017.; Formerly Route 101
552	Cape May	U.S. Route 9 Delsea Drive; Bayshore Road; Seashore Road	Egg Harbor	One intermediate stop between Cape May Court House and Atlantic City at Ocean View Park-Ride; Additional local service operates between Wildwood and Cape May Court House; Formerly Route 102
553	Upper Deerfield	Harding Highway; Cedar Avenue, Landis Avenue; Delsea Drive; Millville-Bridgeton Road; Route 77	Egg Harbor	Formerly Route 103
554	Lindenwold	White Horse Pike	Washington Township	Formerly Route 104
555	Philadelphia 30th Street Station	Atlantic City Expressway; Route 42; Market Street; JFK Boulevard	Washington Township	Weekday rush hours only (AM to Philadelphia, PM to Avandale); Began service on January 14, 2017.
559	Lakewood Bus Terminal	U.S. Route 9	Egg Harbor	Formerly Route 109

Additional limited and seasonal service to the Wildwoods and Cape May via Ocean City and Avalon-by-the-Sea is available through limited 319 service.

== Former routes ==
This list includes routes that have been renumbered or are now operated by private companies.

Route	Terminals		Major streets	History
555 (first use)	Philadelphia	Ocean City	Atlantic City Expressway	Absorbed into route 551.; Discontinued in 1995.; Formerly route 111.
