= U.S. Route 30 in New Jersey =

Highway in New Jersey

U.S. Route 30
- US 30 highlighted in red

Route information
- Maintained by NJDOT, DRPA, and SJTA
- Length: 58.26 mi (93.76 km)
- Existed: 1926–present

Major junctions
- West end: I-676 / US 30 at the Pennsylvania state line in Camden
- US 130 / Route 38 in Pennsauken Township; I-295 in Barrington; Route 73 in Waterford Township; US 206 / Route 54 in Hammonton; Route 50 in Egg Harbor City; G.S. Parkway in Galloway Township; US 9 in Absecon; Route 87 in Atlantic City; A.C.–Brigantine Connector in Atlantic City
- East end: Virginia Avenue in Atlantic City

Location
- Country: United States
- State: New Jersey
- Counties: Camden, Atlantic

Highway system
- United States Numbered Highway System; List; Special; Divided; New Jersey State Highway Routes; Interstate; US; State; Scenic Byways
← Route 29	→ Route 30
← Route 42	→ Route 44

U.S. Route 30 (US 30) is a U.S. highway running from Philadelphia, Pennsylvania east to Atlantic City, New Jersey. In the U.S. state of New Jersey, US 30 runs 58.26 miles (93.76 km) from the Benjamin Franklin Bridge at the Delaware River in Camden, Camden County, while concurrent with Interstate 676 (I-676), southeast to Virginia Avenue in Atlantic City, Atlantic County. Most of the route in New Jersey is known as the White Horse Pike and is four lanes wide. The road runs through mostly developed areas in Camden County, with surroundings becoming more rural as the road approaches Atlantic County. US 30 runs through several towns including Collingswood, Berlin, Hammonton, Egg Harbor City, and Absecon.

Most of US 30 in New Jersey follows the White Horse Pike, a turnpike chartered in 1854 to run from Camden to Stratford and eventually toward Atlantic City. In 1917, pre-1927 Route 3 was legislated to run from Camden to Absecon on the White Horse Pike, while US 30 was designated in New Jersey in 1926 to connect Camden and Atlantic City via the White Horse Pike. A year later, pre-1927 Route 3 was replaced by Route 43, which ran between US 130 near Camden and US 9 (now Route 157) in Absecon, and Route 25 was designated along the portion of US 30 between the Benjamin Franklin Bridge and US 130. The segment of US 30 past Route 43 into Atlantic City became Route 56 in 1938. In 1953, the state highway designations were removed from US 30. A freeway was proposed for US 30 in Camden County during the late 1960s, running from Camden to Berlin; however, it was never built.

== Route description ==
=== Camden County ===
US 30 crosses the Delaware River into New Jersey on the Benjamin Franklin Bridge from Philadelphia, Pennsylvania, along with I-676 and the PATCO Speedline. The road continues east into the downtown area of Camden in Camden County as a seven-lane freeway maintained by the Delaware River Port Authority that passes to the north of the Camden Athletic Complex, located at the former site of the Campbell's Field baseball stadium, and comes to the westbound toll plaza for the bridge. Past the toll plaza, US 30 splits from I-676 at an interchange and heads southeast on the six-lane, divided Admiral Wilson Boulevard maintained by the New Jersey Department of Transportation (NJDOT) and named for Henry Braid Wilson. This portion, formerly known as Bridge Approach Boulevard, is an early example of a roadway designed for the automobile, and was home to the first drive-in movie theatre. Along Admiral Wilson Boulevard, the route passes under a railroad line carrying Conrail Shared Assets Operations' Vineland Secondary and NJ Transit's River Line and has an interchange with CR 537 before widening to eight lanes and crossing the Cooper River. The road runs east through urbanized sections of Camden along the north bank of the Cooper River, interchanging with CR 608. After this interchange, US 30 enters suburban Pennsauken Township and comes to the Airport Circle, which has been modified to include ramps. Here, US 30 meets US 130 and the western terminus of Route 38 and turns south to form a concurrency with US 130 on Crescent Boulevard, a six-lane divided highway that narrows to four lanes. The road crosses the Cooper River into Collingswood, running to the east of Harleigh Cemetery before interchanging with CR 561 and passing under the PATCO Speedline.

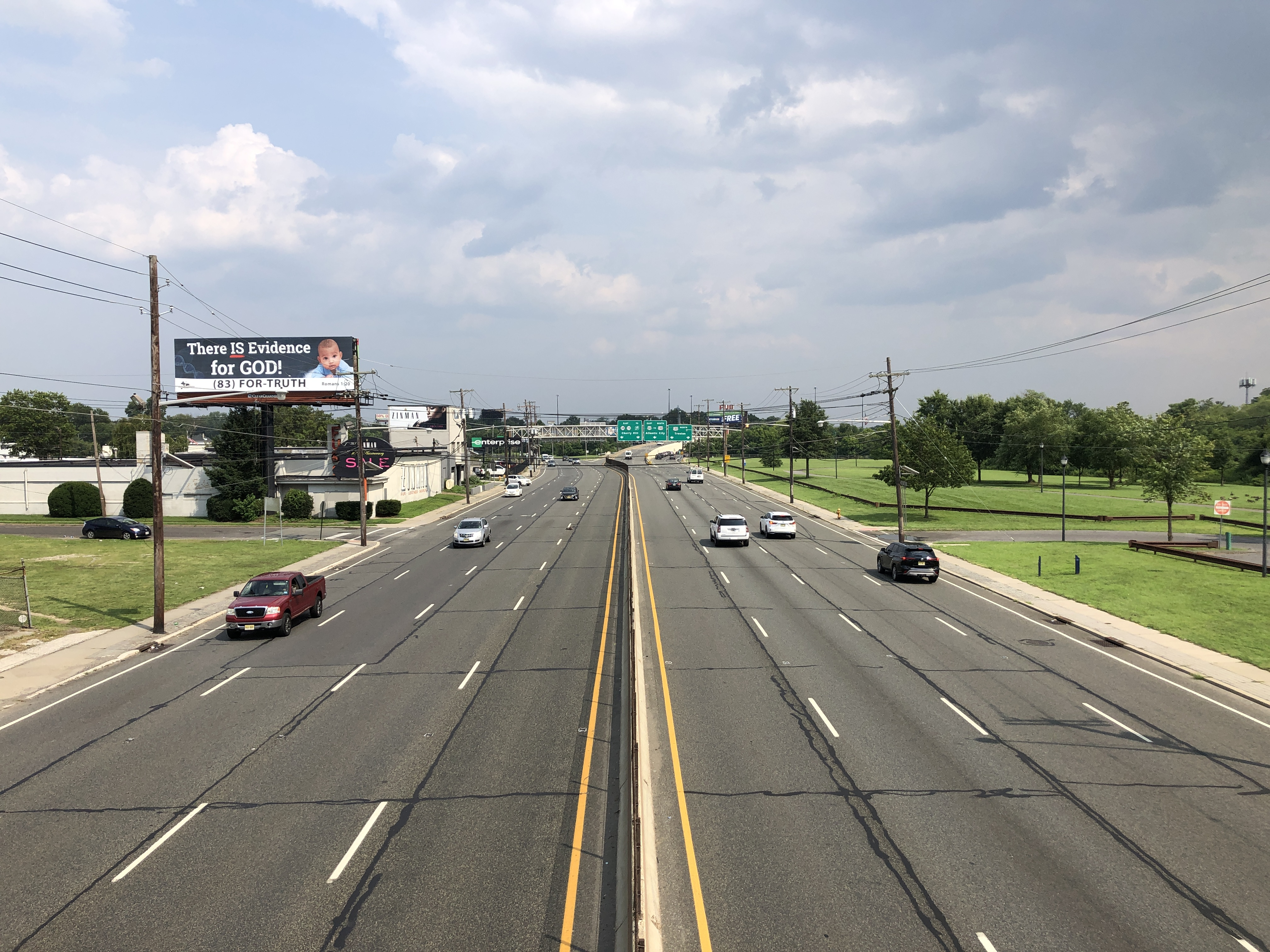
US 30 eastbound on the Admiral Wilson Boulevard approaching US 130 and Route 38 at the Airport Circle in Pennsauken Township

At the former Collingswood Circle, US 30 splits from US 130 by heading south-southeast on two-lane, undivided White Horse Pike. The road passes homes and some businesses before crossing the Newton Creek into Oaklyn, where it passes suburban residential and commercial development. US 30 forms the border between Oaklyn to the west and Haddon Township to the east before heading into Audubon. At the border of Audubon and Haddon Heights, the route crosses CR 551 Spur. In this town, the White Horse Pike reaches an intersection with Route 41 at a modified traffic circle and an interchange with I-295 within a close distance of each other in Barrington. At this point, the route is four lanes wide, with a short divided portion immediately south of I-295.

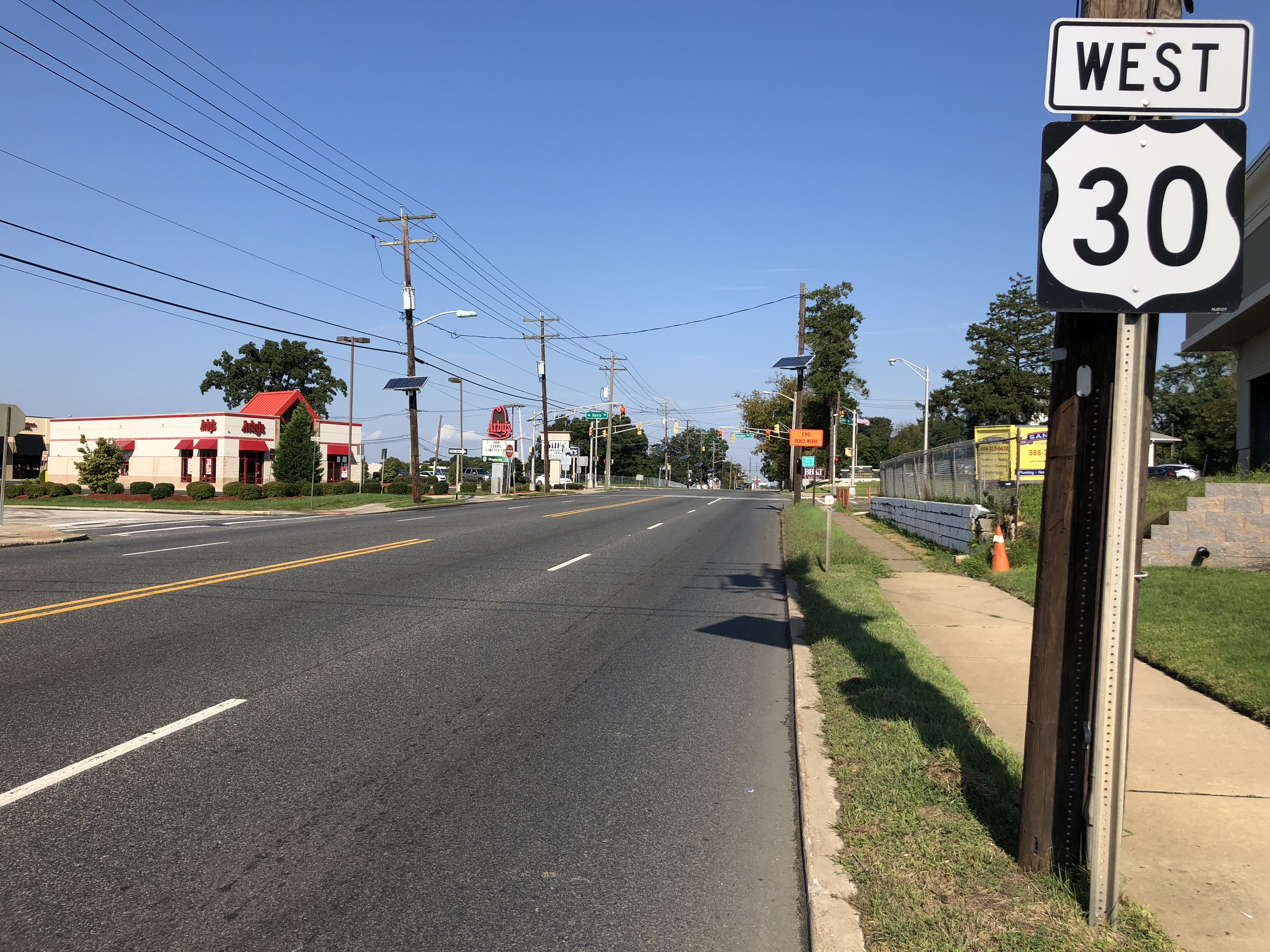
US 30 westbound past CR 669 in Magnolia

US 30 continues into Lawnside, becoming a four-lane undivided road. It passes under the New Jersey Turnpike, but there is no interchange present between the two roads. Past here, the road enters Magnolia, where it crosses CR 544. Following this intersection, the route heads through Somerdale before turning more southeast and forming the border between Stratford to the southwest and Somerdale to the northeast. US 30 entirely enters Stratford as it intersects CR 673 and passes near the Lindenwold station, which is a stop on NJ Transit's Atlantic City Line and the terminus of the PATCO Speedline. The White Horse Pike turns back to the south-southeast and forms the border between Laurel Springs to the west and Lindenwold to the east before continuing fully into Lindenwold. The route later turns southeast and enters Clementon. After a turn to the east, US 30 runs along the border of Lindenwold to the north and Clementon to the south and fully enters Lindenwold again prior to the border with Berlin. In Berlin, the White Horse Pike becomes concurrent with CR 534 and then CR 561 a short distance later. US 30 turns to the south-southeast and passes through the downtown area of Berlin as a two-lane road. Past the downtown area, CR 534 and CR 561 split from US 30 at the same intersection, with CR 534 heading east on Jackson Road and CR 561 heading southeast on Tansboro Road, and US 30 widens back to four lanes. The White Horse Pike encounters Route 73 and CR 536 Spur at a cloverleaf interchange.

Following the interchange, US 30 enters Waterford Township, as it passes near the community of Atco. The road turns south as it passes Atco Lake and continues into more wooded areas with some development, eventually heading south-southeast again. NJ Transit's Atlantic City Line runs a short distance to the northeast of the route at this point. US 30 continues through Chesilhurst before it enters Winslow Township. Here, the route intersects CR 536 and forms a short concurrency with that route before it heads to the east. From this point, the road continues into a mix of woodland, farmland, and development. US 30 intersects Route 143 and passes over the Atlantic City Line as it turns southeast. The road makes another turn to the south as it crosses CR 723 and passes under an abandoned railroad line.

=== Atlantic County ===
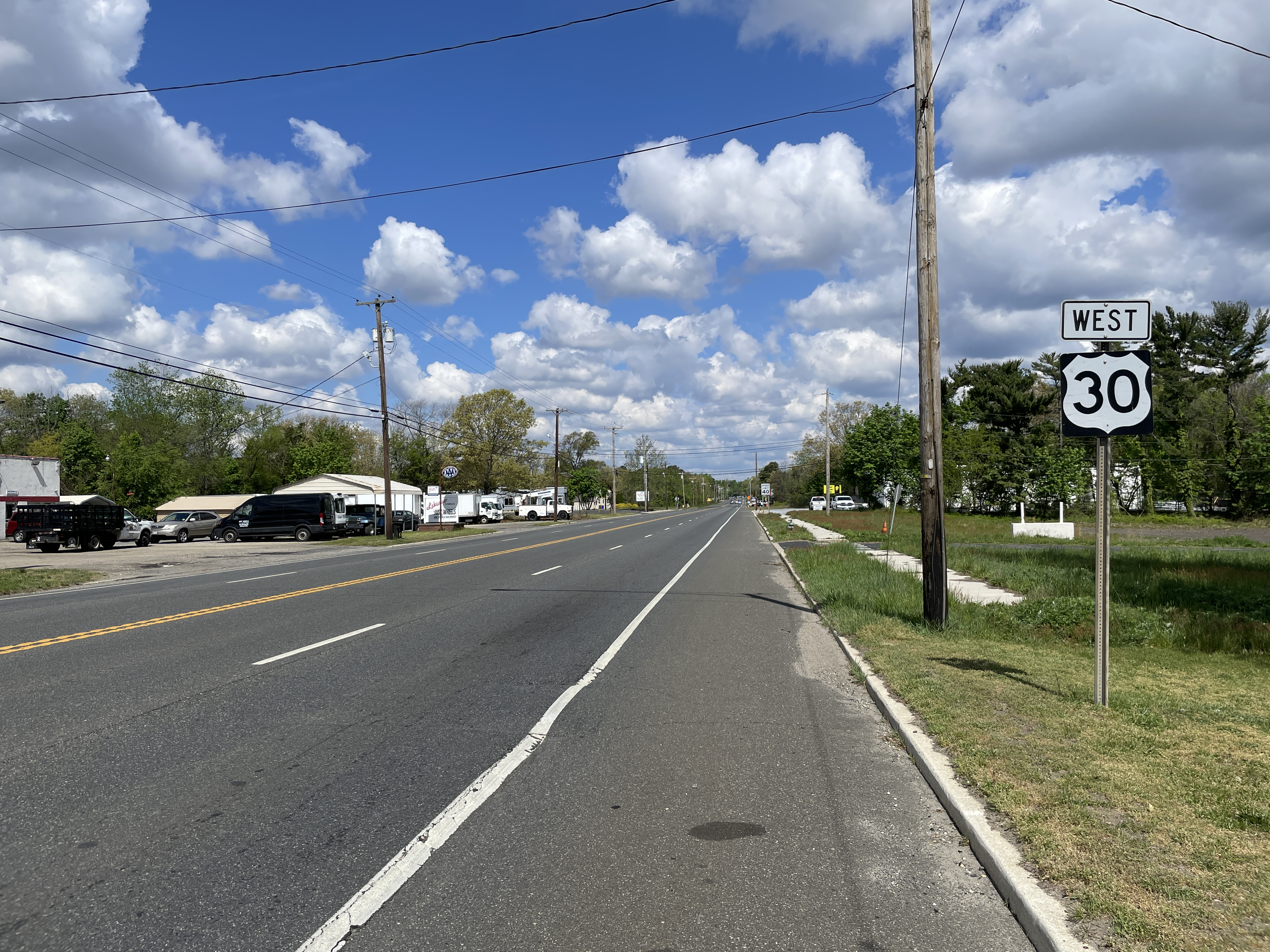
US 30 westbound past CR 542 in Hammonton

US 30 heads southeast into Hammonton, Atlantic County, continuing through rural areas with increasing development. The road comes to its intersection with the southern terminus US 206 and the northern terminus of Route 54. A short distance later, the route has a concurrency with CR 542 that begins adjacent to the former Atlanticare - Kessler Memorial Hospital that closed in 2009 and passes by Hammonton Lake. US 30 turns south-southwest past the CR 542 concurrency before heading south. The route crosses CR 561 and turns southeast again, entering Mullica Township. Here, the White Horse Pike enters more forested areas with a few buildings, running a short distance to the northeast of the Atlantic City Line. Past the intersection with CR 623 in the developed community of Elwood, US 30 becomes a divided highway with grass median and jughandles. This configuration continues until Egg Harbor City, when the median ends. In Egg Harbor City, US 30 passes a mix of homes and businesses, intersecting the northern terminus of Route 50 and CR 563 in the center of town. At this point, CR 563 forms a concurrency with US 30 and the two routes continue through more of the town before crossing into Galloway Township at the intersection with CR 674. The road passes through rural areas with some development, reaching the community of Cologne. In this area, there is a crossroads with CR 614 before CR 563 splits from US 30 by turning south onto Tilton Road. Past Cologne, the road reaches a junction with CR 575 in the developed community of Pomona.

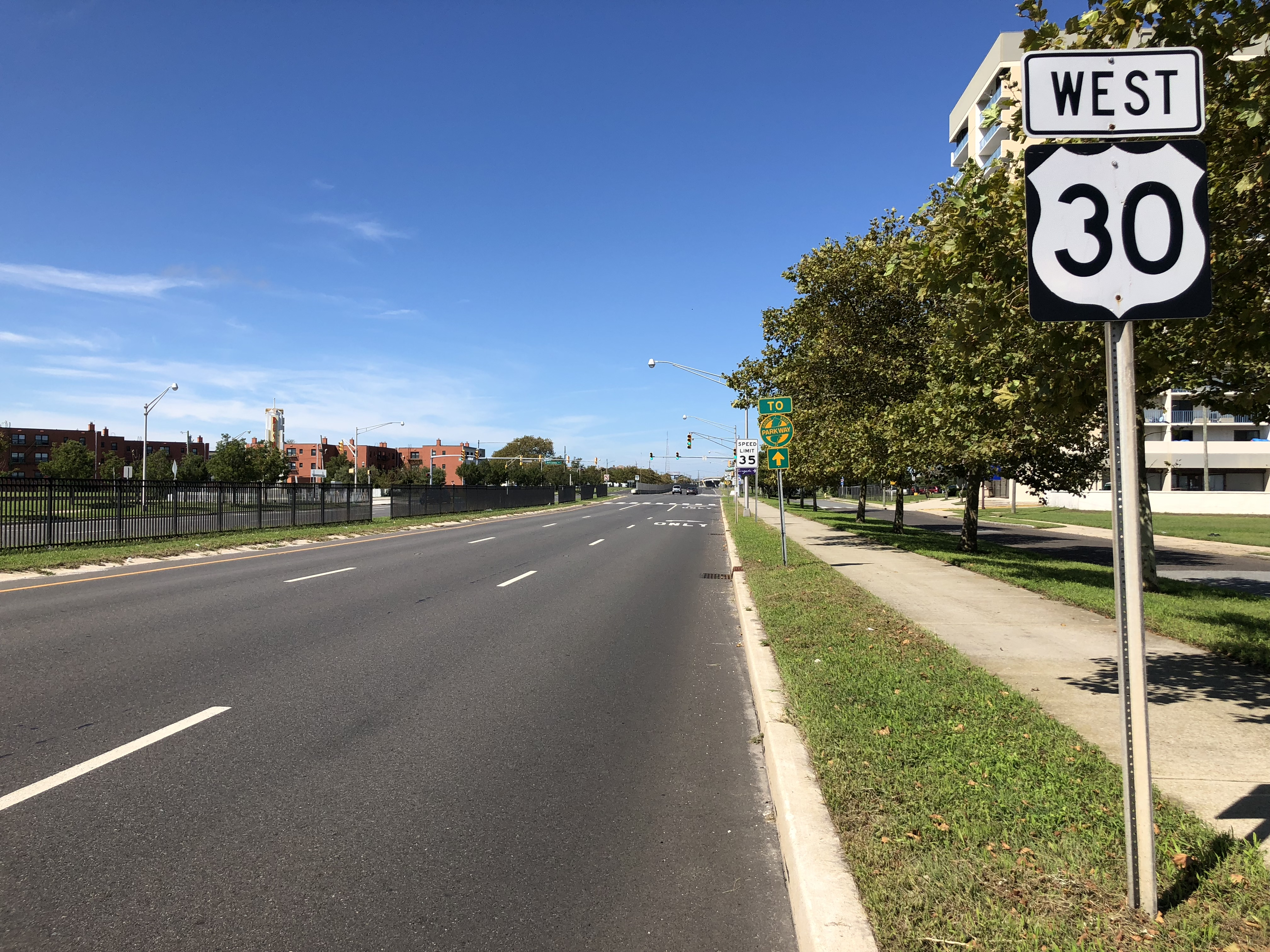
US 30 westbound just west of the eastern terminus in Atlantic City

Following this intersection, US 30 continues southeast past wooded residential neighborhoods to the northeast, becoming a divided highway again. The route comes to a partial interchange with the Garden State Parkway, with access to and from the northbound direction of the parkway. Past this interchange, the road heads through commercial areas and continues into Absecon. In Absecon, the White Horse Pike widens to six lanes and crosses CR 651 before intersecting US 9. After passing near the Absecon station along the Atlantic City Line, US 30 crosses Shore Road, which heads north as Route 157 and south as CR 585. The road turns south, narrowing back to four lanes before entering marshland to the west of Absecon Bay. There is a northbound exit and southbound entrance to CR 646 before US 30 crosses the Jonathans Thorofare into Atlantic City, where the name becomes Absecon Boulevard as it turns to the east. Absecon Boulevard crosses Newfound Thorofare before heading south and passing over Duck Thorofare. The road passes by the Jersey-Atlantic Wind Farm and heads southeast across Beach Thorofare. At this point, US 30 widens to six lanes and passes to the north of residential neighborhoods, with maintenance of the road switching from NJDOT to the South Jersey Transportation Authority. After crossing the Penrose Canal, the route passes over the tunnel carrying the Atlantic City–Brigantine Connector and intersects the southern terminus of Route 87, where there is a ramp to the northbound Atlantic City–Brigantine Connector. The road passes areas of development and intersects an access road to the southbound Atlantic City–Brigantine Connector as well as Route 187. Two blocks later, US 30 ends at the intersection with Virginia Avenue and Adriatic Avenue, where Absecon Boulevard continues east as an unnumbered road.

== History ==
Route 43
- Location: Camden–Absecon
- Existed: 1927–1953

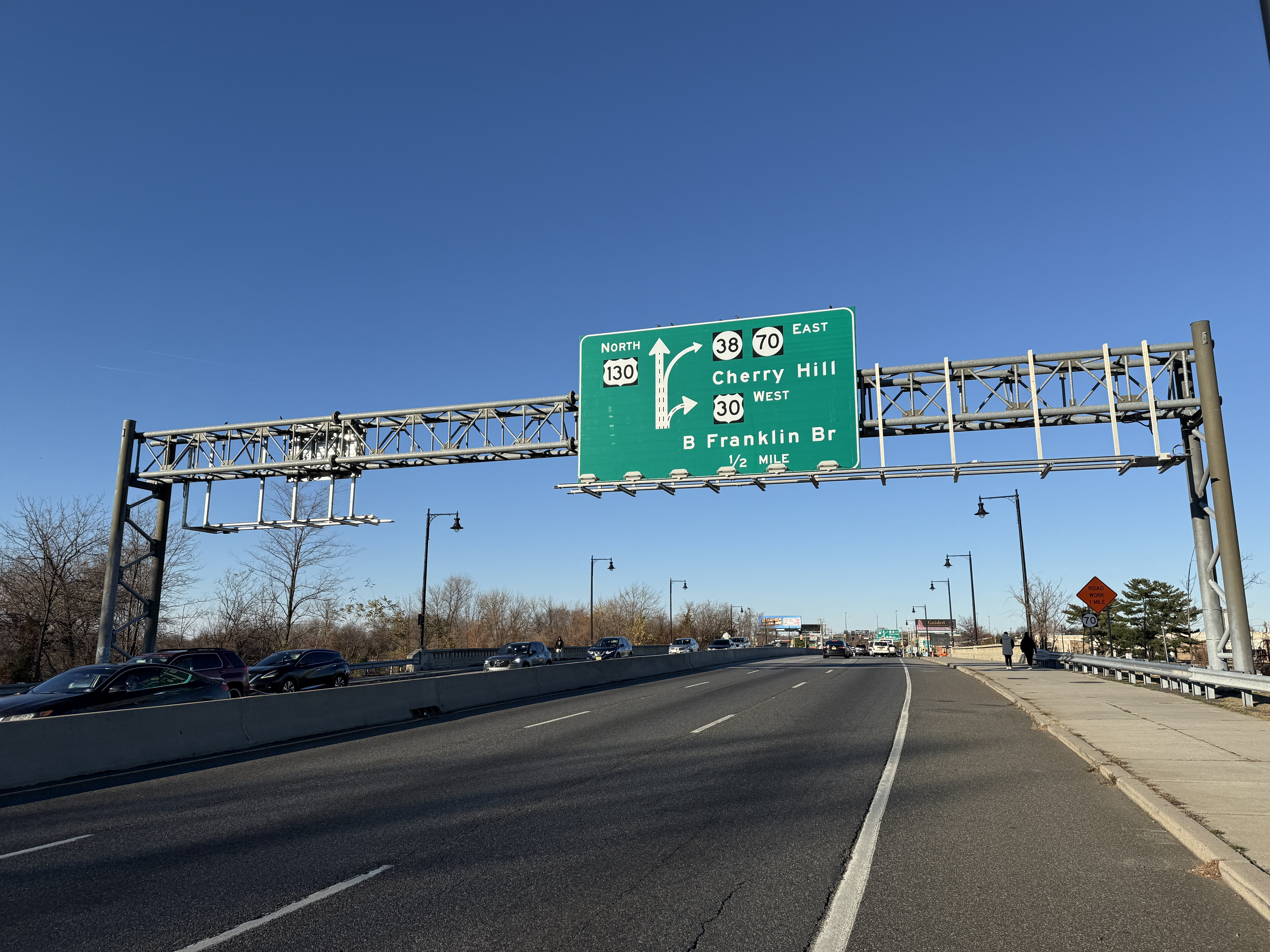
US 30 westbound and US 130 northbound in Camden approaching the Airport Circle in Pennsauken

US 30 followed the course of an old Lenape trail running from what is now Camden to the Absegami lands, in what is now Absecon. This later became the White Horse Road. The White Horse Turnpike Company was incorporated January 27, 1854 with the authority to convert White Horse Road into a turnpike, running from Camden to Stratford and eventually to Atlantic City. By 1913, maintenance of the White Horse Pike became public, and the road was incorporated into an auto trail, signed as the White Horse Trail. The route of US 30 today in New Jersey was designated as pre-1927 Route 3 from 1916 to 1927 between Camden and Absecon.

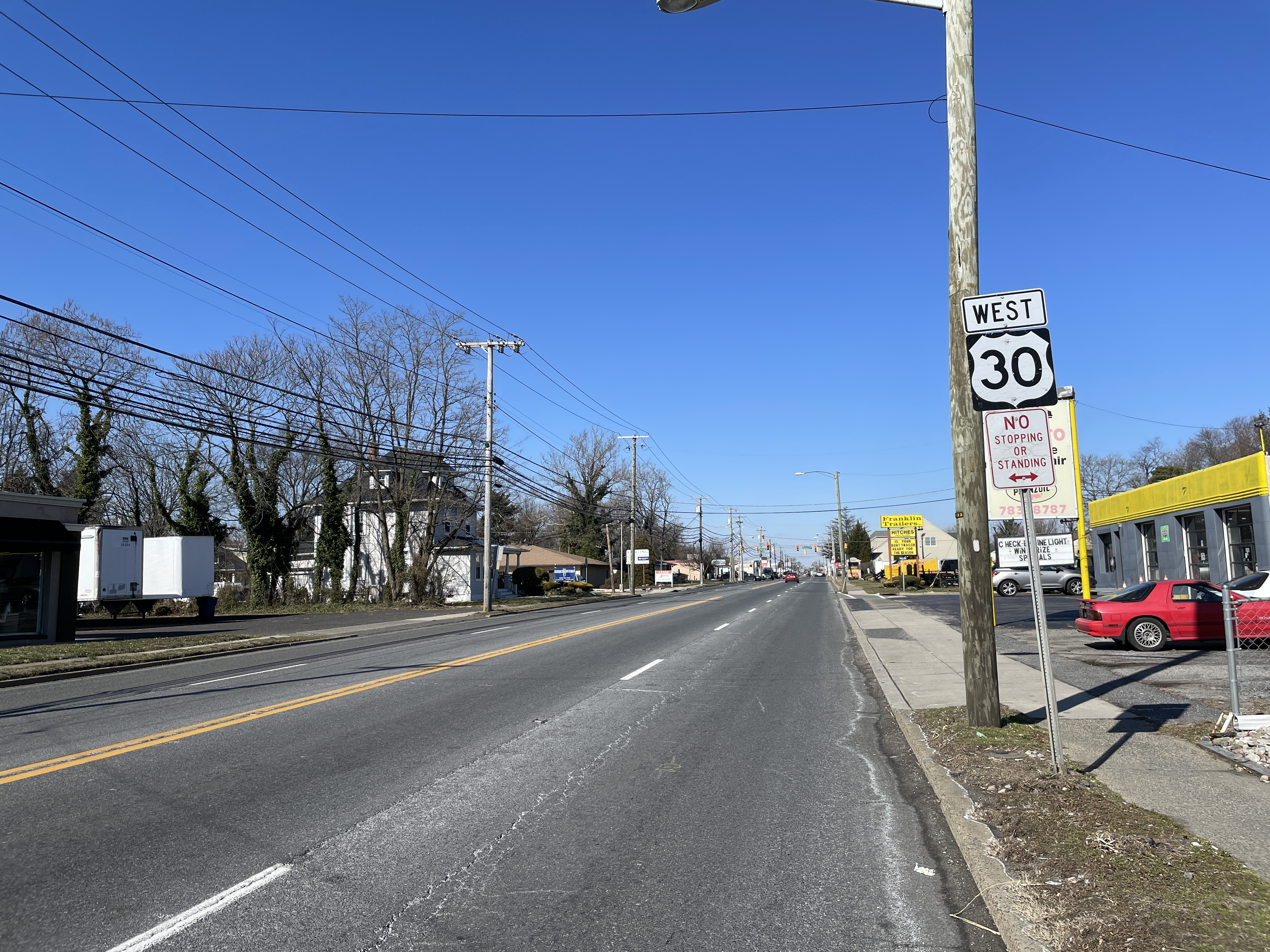
US 30 westbound in Somerdale

On October 30, 1925, plans were made for a cross-country route from Salt Lake City, Utah, to Atlantic City, New Jersey, as part of the U.S. Highway System. This road was designated U.S. Route 30 in 1926. It entered New Jersey from Pennsylvania in Camden and followed the entire length of pre-1927 Route 3 to Absecon before continuing into Atlantic City. In the 1927 New Jersey state highway renumbering, Route 43 replaced the Route 3 designation along US 30 between US 130 and US 9 (now Route 157) in Absecon while Route 25 was designated along with US 30 between the Benjamin Franklin Bridge and US 130. In 1938, the portion of US 30 from the terminus of Route 43 in Absecon into Atlantic City was designated as Route 56. Prior to the 1953 New Jersey state highway renumbering, spur routes of Route 43 and Route 56 were planned. Route S43 was planned in 1938 to be a route running from Route 43 in Germania to Route 4 in Northfield; this was never built as a state highway but the alignment is now followed by CR 563. Route S56 was legislated in 1945 to be a spur of Route 56 to Brigantine along what had also been legislated as Route S4A; this road became Route 87 in 1953.

Route 56
- Location: Absecon–Atlantic City
- Existed: 1938–1953

In the 1953 New Jersey state highway renumbering, which eliminated several concurrencies between U.S. and state routes, the designations of routes 25, 43, and 56 were removed from US 30. Prior to the completion of I-676 across the Benjamin Franklin Bridge in the 1970s, US 30 used Penn Street eastbound and Linden Street westbound to travel between the bridge and Admiral Wilson Boulevard. In the late 1960s, a freeway was proposed for US 30 in Camden County by the Delaware Valley Regional Planning Commission. The freeway, which was to cost $40 million, was to run from the Benjamin Franklin Bridge to I-295 in Barrington with a $16 million extension to the planned Route 90 freeway in Berlin. The segment between Camden and Barrington was to be complete by 1975 while the extension to Berlin was to be finished by 1985. However, the NJDOT did not build this US 30 freeway. In 2009, the Collingswood Circle at the eastern end of the US 130 concurrency was replaced with an at-grade intersection with jughandles.

== Major intersections ==
County	Location	mi	km	Destinations	Notes
Delaware River		0.00	0.00	I-676 west / US 30 west – Central Philadelphia	Continuation into Pennsylvania; former I-76
Delaware River		0.00	0.00	Benjamin Franklin Bridge (westbound toll)	
Camden	Camden	0.92– 1.20	1.48– 1.93	I-676 south – Walt Whitman Bridge, Atlantic City	Eastbound exit and westbound entrance; east end of I-676 overlap
Camden	Camden	1.60	2.57	Linden Street – Camden Business District, Rutgers–Camden	Interchange; westbound exit only; last westbound exit before toll; to Freedom Mortgage Pavilion and E-ZPass Customer Service Center
Camden	Camden	1.75	2.82	Federal Street (CR 537) / Martin Luther King Boulevard – Campbell Place, Waterfront Attractions	Westbound exit and entrance; access to Cooper University Hospital
Camden	Camden	2.49	4.01	Baird Boulevard (CR 608)	Interchange
Camden	Pennsauken Township	3.10– 3.26	4.99– 5.25	US 130 north / Route 38 east to N.J. Turnpike north / Route 70 east – Trenton, Cherry Hill	Airport Circle; west end of US 130 overlap; western terminus of Route 38
Camden	Collingswood	3.92	6.31	CR 561 (Haddon Avenue) – Camden, Collingswood	Interchange
Camden	Collingswood	4.26	6.86	US 130 south (Crescent Boulevard) – Mt. Ephraim, Westville	Former Collingswood Circle; east end of US 130 overlap
Camden	Audubon–Haddon Heights borough line	6.99	11.25	CR 551 Spur (Kings Highway)	
Camden	Haddon Heights–Barrington borough line	7.93	12.76	Route 41 / CR 573 (Clements Bridge Road) – Barrington, Runnemede, Haddonfield	
Camden	Barrington	8.00	12.87	I-295 – Trenton, Walt Whitman Bridge, Delaware Memorial Bridge	Exit 29 on I-295
Camden	Magnolia	9.71	15.63	CR 544 (Evesham Avenue) – Ashland, Deptford Township	
Camden	Berlin	16.31	26.25	CR 534 west (Clementon Berlin Road) – Clementon	West end of CR 534 overlap
Camden	Berlin	16.50	26.55	CR 561 north (Haddon Avenue)	West end of CR 561 overlap
Camden	Berlin	17.01	27.37	CR 534 east (Jackson Road) – Atco	East end of CR 534 overlap
Camden	Berlin	17.07	27.47	CR 561 south (Tansboro Avenue) – Tansboro	East end of CR 561 overlap
Camden	Berlin–Waterford Township municipal line	18.28	29.42	CR 536 Spur south (Taunton Road) – Williamstown	
Camden	Waterford Township	18.34	29.52	Route 73 to N.J. Turnpike north – Marlton, Tacony Bridge, Folsom	Interchange
Camden	Winslow Township	23.16	37.27	CR 536 west (Pump Branch Road)	West end of CR 536 overlap
Camden	Winslow Township	23.25	37.42	CR 536 east (Pennington Avenue)	East end of CR 536 overlap
Camden	Winslow Township	25.05	40.31	Route 143 south (Spring Garden Road) / CR 716 north (Old White Horse Pike) – Ancora Psychiatric Hospital	
Atlantic	Hammonton	29.71	47.81	US 206 north / Route 54 south (Bellevue Avenue) – Trenton, Buena	Southern terminus of US 206; northern terminus of Route 54
Atlantic	Hammonton	31.05	49.97	CR 542 west (Central Avenue) to A.C. Expressway	West end of CR 542 overlap
Atlantic	Hammonton	31.13	50.10	CR 542 east (Pleasant Mills Road) – Batsto	East end of CR 542 overlap
Atlantic	Hammonton	32.11	51.68	CR 561 (Moss Mill Road) – Smithville	
Atlantic	Egg Harbor City	41.27	66.42	Route 50 south / CR 563 north (Philadelphia Avenue) to A.C. Expressway – Batsto	Northern terminus of Route 50; west end of CR 563 overlap
Atlantic	Galloway Township	44.21	71.15	CR 563 south (Tilton Road) to A.C. Expressway – Northfield, Margate	East end of CR 563 overlap
Atlantic	Galloway Township	46.45	74.75	CR 575 (Pomona Road) to A.C. Expressway – Port Republic, McKee City	
Atlantic	Galloway Township	49.25	79.26	G.S. Parkway north	Exit 40 (GSP); westbound exit to GSP northbound / eastbound entrance from GSP southbound only
Atlantic	Absecon	51.59	83.03	US 9 (New Road) – Smithville, Cape May	
Atlantic	Absecon	52.04	83.75	Route 157 north / CR 585 south (Shore Road) – New Gretna, Pleasantville	Southern terminus of Route 157; northern terminus of CR 585
Atlantic	Absecon	52.04	83.75	CR 646 west (Delilah Road) to A.C. Expressway / US 40 / US 322	Westbound exit, eastbound entrance
Atlantic	Atlantic City	57.50	92.54	Route 87 north (Huron Avenue) to A.C. Expressway – Brigantine, Convention Center, Marina, Downbeach	Southern terminus of Route 87
Atlantic	Atlantic City	57.91	93.20	A.C.–Brigantine Connector south / Route 187 north (Brigantine Boulevard) to A.C. Expressway west	Exit E on the Brigantine Connector
Atlantic	Atlantic City	58.26	93.76	Virginia Avenue / Absecon Boulevard / Adriatic Avenue	Eastern terminus of US 30
1.000 mi = 1.609 km; 1.000 km = 0.621 mi: Concurrency terminus; Incomplete access; Tolled

== See also ==
- Black Horse Pike

U.S. Route 30
Previous state: Pennsylvania	New Jersey	Next state: Terminus
