= Absecon Highlands, New Jersey =

Populated place in Atlantic County, New Jersey, US

- Census-designated place
- Location in Atlantic County Location in New Jersey Location in the United States
- Coordinates: 39°26′33″N 74°28′40″W
- Country: United States
- State: New Jersey
- County: Atlantic
- Township: Galloway

Area
  - Total: 2.44 sq mi (6.31 km^{2})
  - Land: 1.95 sq mi (5.06 km^{2})
  - Water: 0.48 sq mi (1.25 km^{2})
- Elevation: 3 ft (0.91 m)

Population (2020)
  - Total: 1,414
  - Density: 723.8/sq mi (279.46/km^{2})
- Time zone: UTC−05:00 (Eastern (EST))
  - Summer (DST): UTC−04:00 (EDT)
- ZIP Code: 08205 (Absecon)
- Area code: 609
- FIPS code: 34-00160
- GNIS feature ID: 2804146

Absecon Highlands is an unincorporated community and census-designated place (CDP) in Atlantic County, in the U.S. state of New Jersey. It is in the eastern part of the county, in southern Galloway Township. It is bordered to the south by the city of Absecon and to the east by Reeds Bay, a tidal water body the connects to the Atlantic Ocean through Broad Creek and Absecon Inlet. The CDP includes the neighborhoods of Absecon Highlands, Seaview Estates, Seaview Park, Conovertown, and Holly Brook. As of the 2020 census, Absecon Highlands had a population of 1,414.

U.S. Route 9 (New York Road) is the main road through the community; it leads north 7 miles (11 km) to the Garden State Parkway in Port Republic and south through Absecon 4 miles (6 km) to the Atlantic City Expressway in Pleasantville.

The community was first listed as a CDP prior to the 2020 census.

== Demographics ==
Historical population
Census	Pop.	Note	%±
2020	1,414		—
U.S. Decennial Census; 1990 2000 2010 2020

Absecon Highlands was first listed as a census designated place in the 2020 U.S. census.

=== 2020 census ===
Absecon Highlands CDP, New Jersey – Racial and ethnic composition Note: the US Census treats Hispanic/Latino as an ethnic category. This table excludes Latinos from the racial categories and assigns them to a separate category. Hispanics/Latinos may be of any race.
Race / Ethnicity (NH = Non-Hispanic)	Pop 2020	% 2020
White alone (NH)	941	66.55%
Black or African American alone (NH)	70	4.95%
Native American or Alaska Native alone (NH)	1	0.07%
Asian alone (NH)	125	8.84%
Pacific Islander alone (NH)	1	0.07%
Other Race alone (NH)	4	0.28%
Mixed race or Multiracial (NH)	73	5.16%
Hispanic or Latino (any race)	199	14.07%
Total	1,414	100.00%

== Education ==
The CDP is within two school districts: Galloway Township School District (elementary) and Greater Egg Harbor Regional High School District. The zoned high school for Galloway Township is Absegami High School, which is a part of the Greater Egg Harbor district.
