= Mushond Lee =

American actor

- Born: December 16, 1970 (age 54); North Trenton, New Jersey
- Occupation(s): Film, television actor, soap opera actor

Mushond Lee (born December 16, 1970) is an American actor recognized from his recurring role as Jo-Jo Muhammad in NBC's soap opera Sunset Beach. He appeared regularly in season 7 of The Cosby Show. He has also starred in the film 2001 Maniacs as the character Malcolm.

Lee was born in North Trenton, New Jersey. He grew up in Smithville, Galloway Township, New Jersey, and attended Absegami High School, from which he graduated in 1989.

== Filmography ==
=== Film ===
Year	Title	Role	Notes
1989	Lean on Me	Richard Armand	
1993	Street Knight	Joker	
1997	Behind Enemy Lines	Luther	
1997	Conspiracy Theory	Intern	
2002	Love and a Bullet	Pretty Nate	Also location manager
2003	With or Without You	Robert Hightower	
2003	Charlie's Angels: Full Throttle	FBI Agent	
2005	2001 Maniacs	Malcolm	
2010	Perfect Combination	Ralph the Waiter	

=== Television ===
Year	Title	Role	Notes
1990–1991	The Cosby Show	Slide	3 episodes
1991	True Colors	Reggie	Episode: "Not My Sister, Brother"
1992	Beverly Hills, 90210	Will	Episode: "Home and Away"
1993	Where I Live	Wendell	Episode: "Dontay's Inferno"
1993	The Fresh Prince of Bel-Air	Orlando	Episode: "Blood Is Thicker Than Mud"
1995	Martin	Wesley	Episode: "Three Homies and a Baby"
1995	P.C.H.	Joe	Television film
1997	Sunset Beach	JoJo Mohammad	8 episodes
1997	Early Edition	Frank Matthews	Episode: "The Meal"
1998	Blade Squad	Jonesy	Television film
1998	Vengeance Unlimited	Military Officer in the Bar	Episode: "Dishonorable Discharge"
1999	The '60s	Huey P. Newton	Miniseries
2001	Angel	Jackson	Episode: "The Thin Dead Line"
2001	James Dean	Billy	Television film
