= Germania, New Jersey =

Populated place in Atlantic County, New Jersey, US

- Census-designated place
- Location in Atlantic County Location in New Jersey Location in the United States
- Coordinates: 39°30′42″N 74°35′57″W
- Country: United States
- State: New Jersey
- County: Atlantic
- Township: Galloway

Area
  - Total: 2.63 sq mi (6.82 km^{2})
  - Land: 2.63 sq mi (6.80 km^{2})
  - Water: 0.0077 sq mi (0.02 km^{2})
- Elevation: 62 ft (19 m)

Population (2020)
  - Total: 297
  - Density: 113.2/sq mi (43.71/km^{2})
- Time zone: UTC−05:00 (Eastern (EST))
  - Summer (DST): UTC−04:00 (EDT)
- ZIP Code: 08215 (Egg Harbor City)
- Area code: 609
- FIPS code: 34-26010
- GNIS feature ID: 2804152

Germania is a census-designated place (CDP) located in Atlantic County, in the U.S. state of New Jersey. It is in the east-central part of the county, in western Galloway Township. It is bordered to the south by the unincorporated community of Cologne, and Egg Harbor City is 3 miles (5 km) to the northwest. U.S. Route 30 touches the southern border of Germania, leading northwest through Egg Harbor City 15 miles (24 km) to Hammonton and southeast 13 miles (21 km) to Atlantic City.

As of the 2020 census, Germania had a population of 297.

Clarks Mill Stream, a northeast-flowing tributary of Nacote Creek and thence the tidal Mullica River, forms the southeastern border of the Germania CDP.

Germania was first listed as a CDP prior to the 2020 census.

== Demographics ==
Historical population
Census	Pop.	Note	%±
2020	297		—
U.S. Decennial Census; 2020

Germania first appeared as a census designated place in the 2020 U.S. census.

Germania CDP, New Jersey – Racial and ethnic composition Note: the US Census treats Hispanic/Latino as an ethnic category. This table excludes Latinos from the racial categories and assigns them to a separate category. Hispanics/Latinos may be of any race.
Race / Ethnicity (NH = Non-Hispanic)	Pop 2020	2020
White alone (NH)	279	93.94%
Black or African American alone (NH)	3	1.01%
Native American or Alaska Native alone (NH)	0	0.00%
Asian alone (NH)	0	0.00%
Native Hawaiian or Pacific Islander alone (NH)	0	0.00%
Other race alone (NH)	1	0.34%
Mixed race or Multiracial (NH)	9	3.03%
Hispanic or Latino (any race)	5	1.68%
Total	297	100.00%

As of 2020, the area had a population of 297.

== Education ==
The CDP is within two school districts: Galloway Township School District (elementary) and Greater Egg Harbor Regional High School District. The zoned high school for Galloway Township is Absegami High School, which is a part of the Greater Egg Harbor district.
