= Cologne, New Jersey =

Populated place in Atlantic County, New Jersey, US

- Census-designated place
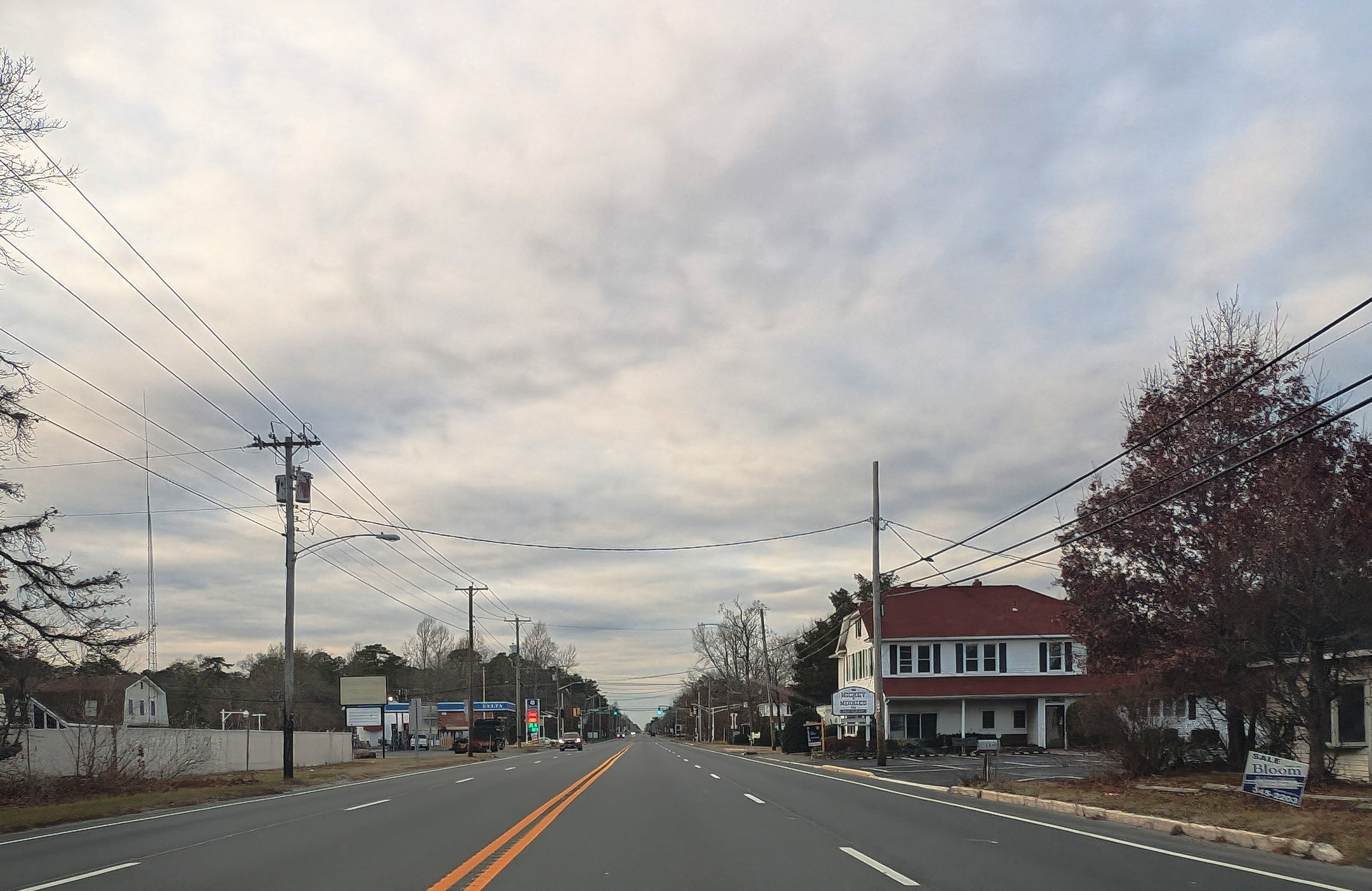
- Westbound US 30 (White Horse Pike) in Cologne

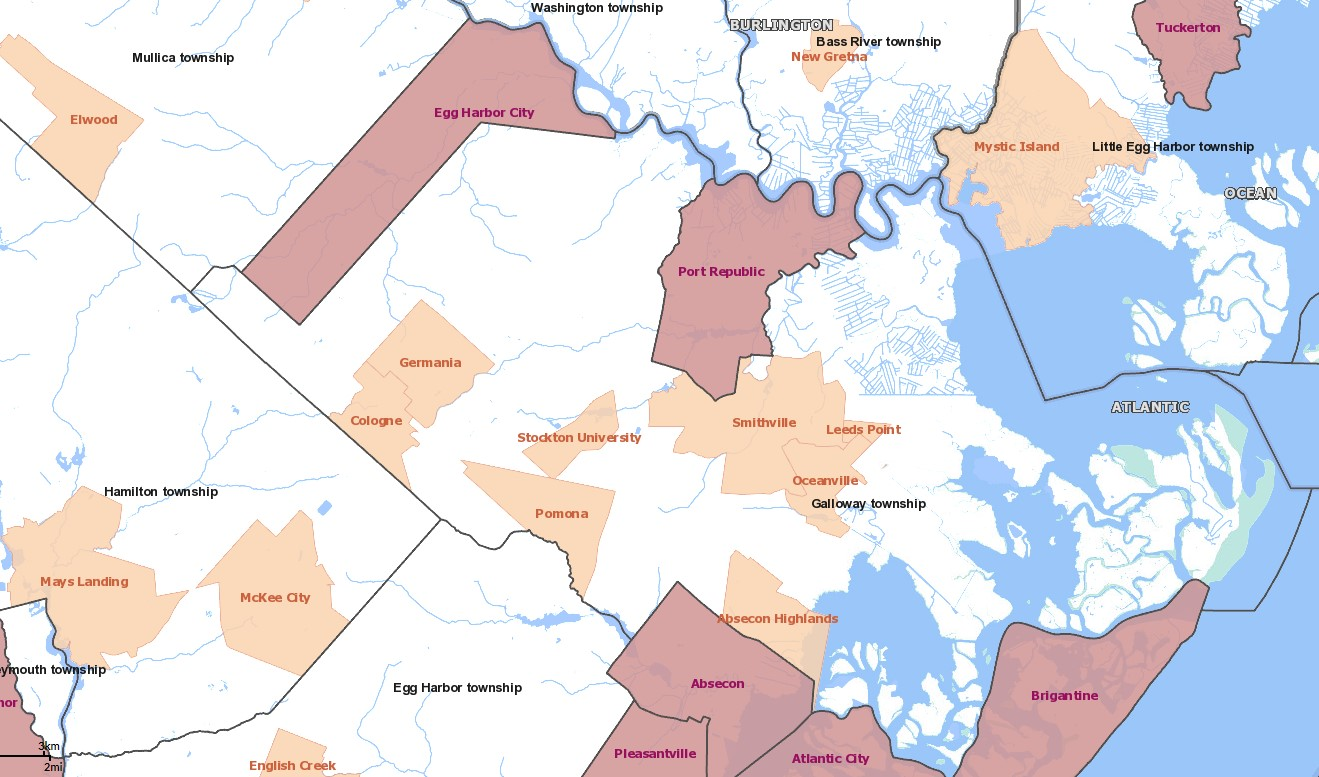

- Location in Atlantic County Location in New Jersey Location in the United States
- Coordinates: 39°30′17″N 74°36′48″W
- Country: United States
- State: New Jersey
- County: Atlantic
- Township: Galloway

Area
  - Total: 1.84 sq mi (4.76 km^{2})
  - Land: 1.83 sq mi (4.75 km^{2})
  - Water: 0.0039 sq mi (0.01 km^{2})
- Elevation: 59 ft (18 m)

Population (2020)
  - Total: 1,461
  - Density: 797/sq mi (307.6/km^{2})
- Time zone: UTC−05:00 (Eastern (EST))
  - Summer (DST): UTC−04:00 (Eastern (EDT))
- ZIP Code: 08213
- Area codes: 609/640
- FIPS code: 34-14350
- GNIS feature ID: 2804148

Cologne is an unincorporated community and census-designated place (CDP) located within Galloway Township, in Atlantic County, in the U.S. state of New Jersey. Cologne is located on U.S. Route 30, about 2.5 miles (4.0 km) southeast of Egg Harbor City. Cologne has a post office with ZIP Code 08213.

It was first listed as a CDP in the 2020 census with a population was 1,461.

== Demographics ==
Historical population
Census	Pop.	Note	%±
2020	1,461		—
U.S. Decennial Census; 2020

Cologne first appeared as a census designated place in the 2020 U.S. census.

=== 2020 census ===
Cologne CDP, New Jersey – Racial and ethnic composition Note: the US Census treats Hispanic/Latino as an ethnic category. This table excludes Latinos from the racial categories and assigns them to a separate category. Hispanics/Latinos may be of any race.
Race / Ethnicity (NH = Non-Hispanic)	Pop 2020	2020
White alone (NH)	1,181	80.84%
Black or African American alone (NH)	87	5.95%
Native American or Alaska Native alone (NH)	0	0.00%
Asian alone (NH)	48	3.29%
Native Hawaiian or Pacific Islander alone (NH)	1	0.07%
Other race alone (NH)	3	0.21%
Mixed race or Multiracial (NH)	71	4.86%
Hispanic or Latino (any race)	70	4.79%
Total	1,461	100.00%

== Education ==
The CDP is within two school districts: Galloway Township School District (elementary) and Greater Egg Harbor Regional High School District. The zoned high school for Galloway Township is Absegami High School, which is a part of the Greater Egg Harbor district.
