= Galloway Township, New Jersey =

Township in Atlantic County, New Jersey, US

- Township
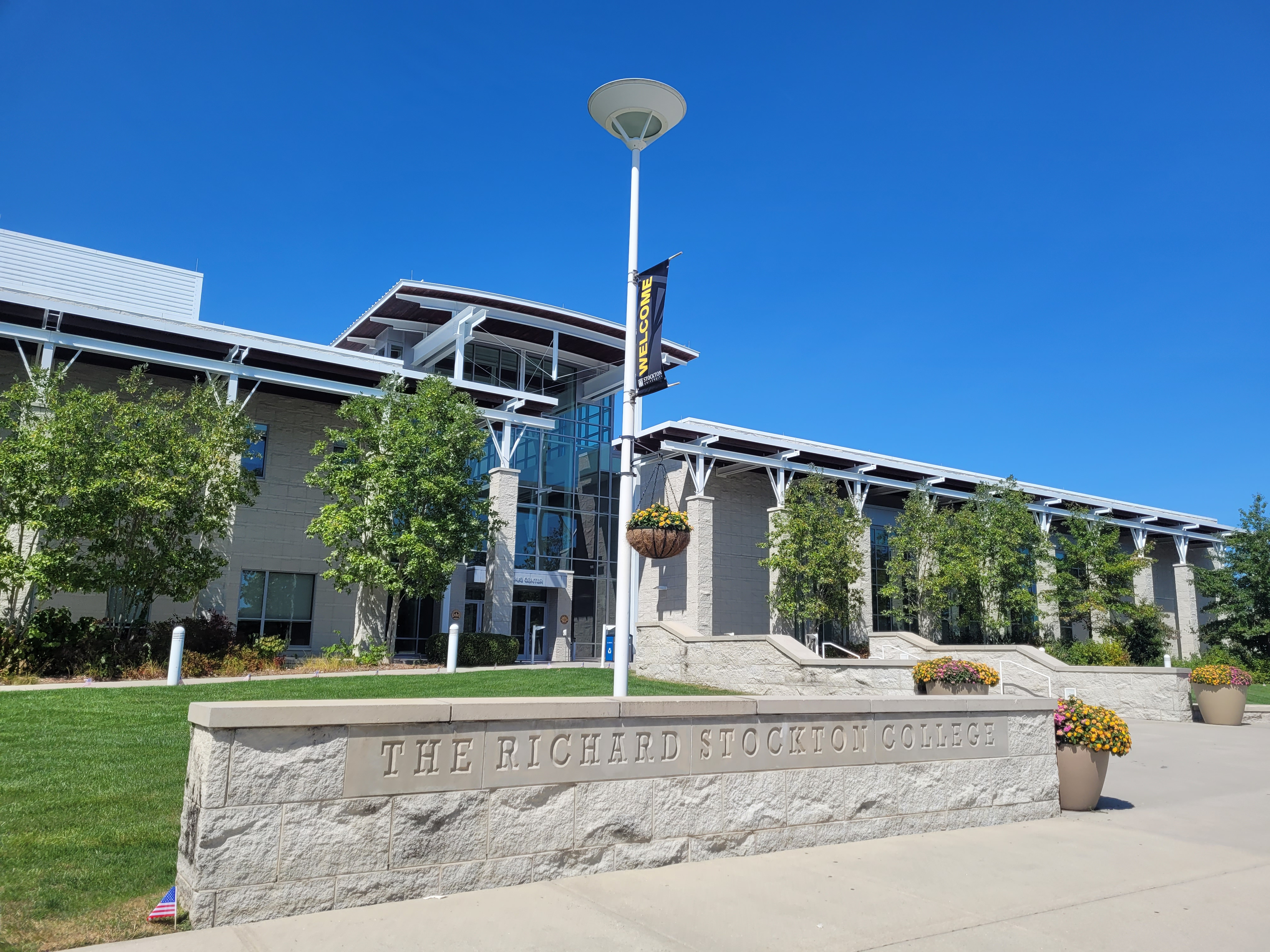
- Student center of Stockton University situated in Galloway Township

- Seal

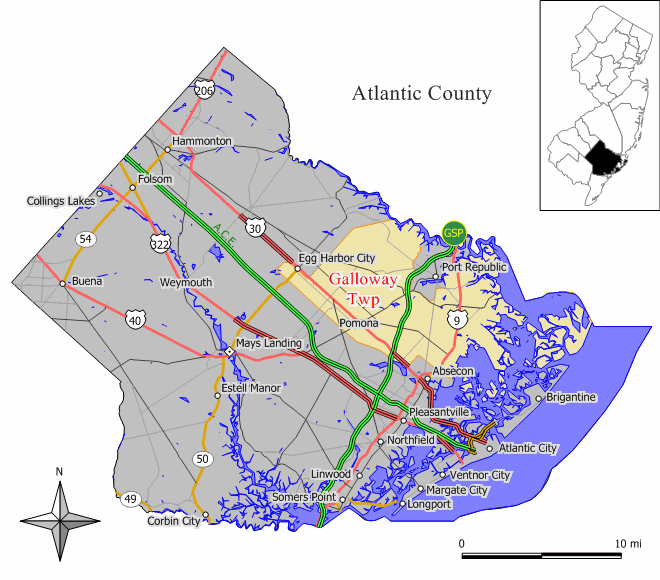
- Location of Galloway Township in Atlantic County highlighted in yellow (left). Inset map: Location of Atlantic County in New Jersey highlighted in black (right).

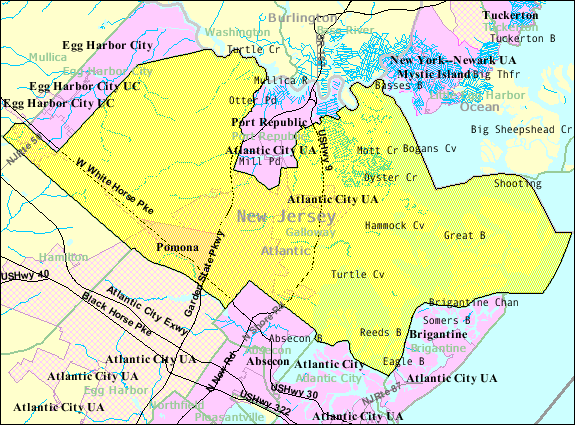
- Census Bureau map of Galloway Township, New Jersey

- Location in Atlantic County Location in New Jersey Location in the United States
- Coordinates: 39.491453°N 74.473867°W
- Country: United States
- State: New Jersey
- County: Atlantic
- Royal charter: April 4, 1774
- Incorporated: February 21, 1798
- Named after: Joseph Galloway or Mull of Galloway

Government
  - Type: Faulkner Act (council–manager)
  - Body: Township Council
  - Mayor: Anthony Coppola (R, term ends December 31, 2027)
  - Deputy Mayor: Tony DiPietro (R, term ends December 31, 2027)
  - Administrator: Chris Johansen
  - Municipal clerk: Kelli Danieli

Area
  - Total: 114.49 sq mi (296.52 km^{2})
  - Land: 88.67 sq mi (229.65 km^{2})
  - Water: 25.82 sq mi (66.87 km^{2}) 22.55%
  - Rank: 1st of 565 in state 1st of 23 in county
- Elevation: 30 ft (9.1 m)

Population (2020)
  - Total: 37,813
  - Estimate (2023): 37,876
  - Rank: 63rd of 565 in state 3rd of 23 in county
  - Density: 426.5/sq mi (164.7/km^{2})
  - Rank: 452nd of 565 in state 13th of 23 in county
- Time zone: UTC−05:00 (Eastern (EST))
  - Summer (DST): UTC−04:00 (Eastern (EDT))
- ZIP Codes: 08201, 08205
- Area code: 609 exchanges: 404, 652, 748
- FIPS code: 3400125560
- GNIS feature ID: 0882052
- Website: www.gtnj.org

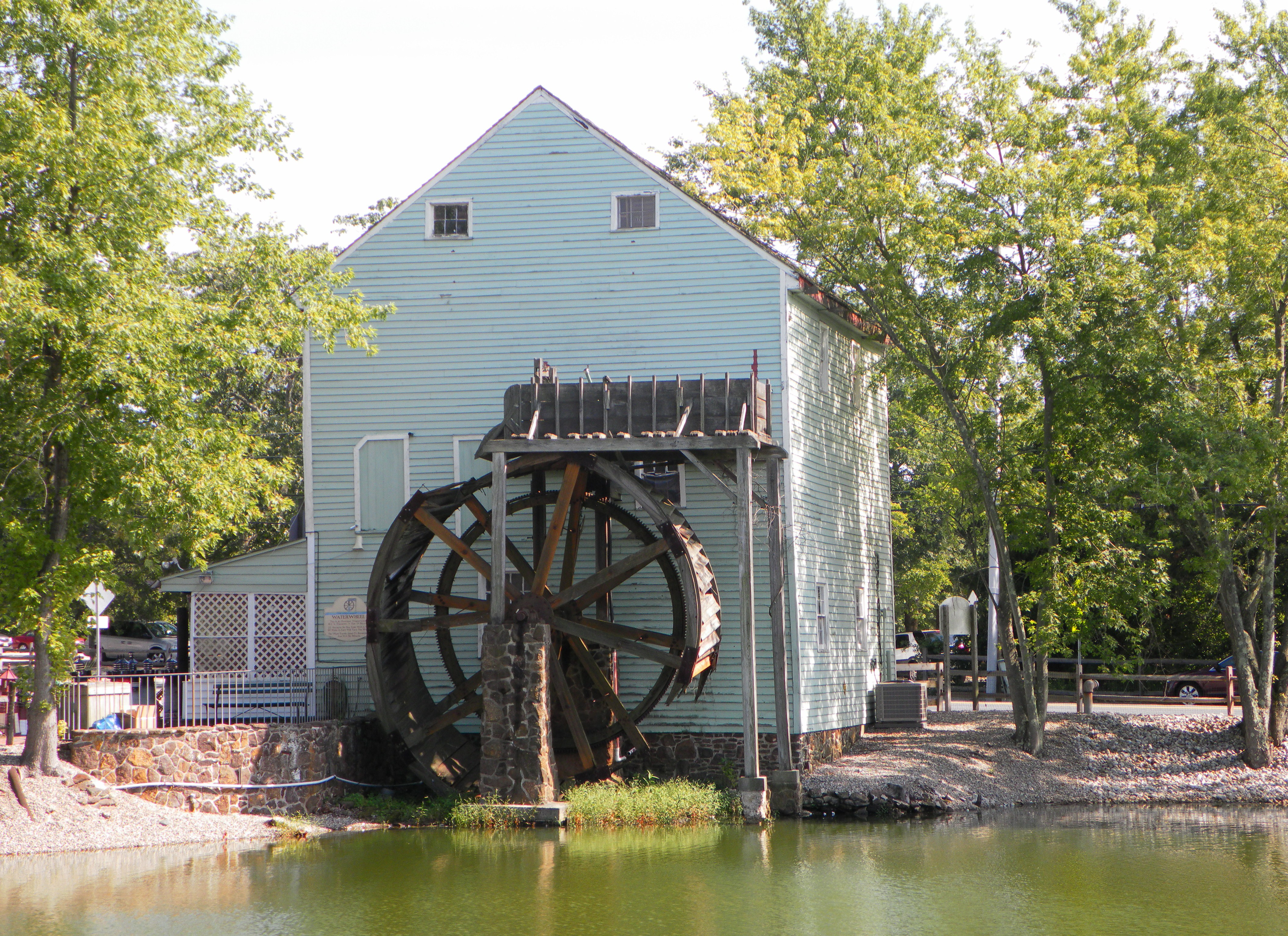
Historic Oliphant Grist Mill

Galloway Township is a township in Atlantic County, in the U.S. state of New Jersey, and a growing edge city to neighboring Atlantic City. At 114.49 square miles (296.5 km^{2}) of total area of land and water, Galloway Township is the largest municipality in the state. As of the 2020 United States census, the township's population was 37,813, its highest decennial count ever and an increase of 464 (+1.2%) from the 2010 census count of 37,349, which in turn reflected an increase of 6,140 (+19.7%) from the 31,209 counted in the 2000 census.

Galloway Township was incorporated by Royal charter on April 4, 1774, from portions of Egg Harbor Township, when it was still part of Gloucester County. Galloway was incorporated as one of the initial group of 104 townships by an act of the New Jersey Legislature on February 21, 1798. After becoming part of the newly formed Atlantic County in 1837, portions of the township were taken to create Mullica Township (March 13, 1838), Egg Harbor City (June 14, 1858), Absecon (February 29, 1872), Brigantine Beach borough (now Brigantine; June 14, 1890) and Port Republic (March 1, 1905).

Geographically, the township, and all of Atlantic County, is part of the South Jersey region of the state and of the Atlantic City-Hammonton metropolitan statistical area, which in turn is included in the Philadelphia metropolitan area.

== History ==
The Township of Galloway was created by a Royal Patent issued by King George III of Great Britain on April 4, 1774. At that time it was part of Gloucester County, and encompassed what are now Hammonton, Mullica Township, Egg Harbor City, Port Republic, Brigantine, Atlantic City, and the northern portion of Absecon. Galloway Township was incorporated by the New Jersey Legislature on February 21, 1798, as one of the state's initial group of 104 townships under the Township Act of 1798.

For thousands of years, the area now known as Galloway Township was occupied by different cultures of indigenous peoples. The Lenape Native Americans were the historic tribe who occupied the area at the time of European encounter. They were one of the many Algonguian language peoples of the East Coast.

European settlers arrived later, with the English forming the majority of the earliest colonial settlements. Historians are uncertain about the origin of Galloway Township's name. One theory is that it was named after the historic region of Galloway, which is now part of the modern region of Dumfries and Galloway in southern Scotland. An alternative derivation is that the Township was named for Joseph Galloway, a Loyalist delegate to the First Continental Congress in 1774, who opposed the independence of the Thirteen Colonies. During the American Revolutionary War, Galloway was the site of the Battle of Chestnut Neck, which took place in an area that is now a part of Port Republic.

During the spring of 2007, a large swath of oak and other hardwood trees was defoliated by gypsy moth caterpillars. Due to budget constraints, the township did not apply for spraying through the State of New Jersey, and the gypsy moth population expanded significantly.

On the morning of August 28, 2011, Tropical Storm Irene made its second U.S. landfall in Brigantine, though initial reports placed it at the Little Egg Inlet on the border with Little Egg Harbor Township. At the time it was believed to be the first hurricane to make landfall in New Jersey since 1903, but later analysis by the National Hurricane Center determined that the storm had weakened to tropical storm status by the time it made its second landfall.

== Geography ==
According to the U.S. Census Bureau, the township had a total area of 114.49 square miles (296.52 km^{2}), including 88.67 square miles (229.65 km^{2}) of land and 25.82 square miles (66.87 km^{2}) of water (22.55%). Galloway Township serves as a growing edge city to neighboring Atlantic City.

Absecon Highlands (2020 Census population of 1,414), Cologne (1,461), Germania (297), Leeds Point (205), Oceanville (793), Pomona (7,416), Smithville (7,242), and Stockton University (2,428) are unincorporated communities and census-designated places (CDPs) located within Galloway Township.

Other unincorporated communities, localities and place names located partially or completely within the township include Absecon, Brigantine Junction, Cologne Station, Conovertown, Doughtys, Hewittville, Higbeetown, Island Beach, Johnsontown, Pinehurst, Pomerania, South Egg Harbor, Somersville, and the "Township Center".

The township borders the municipalities of Absecon, Atlantic City, Egg Harbor City, Egg Harbor Township, Hamilton Township, Mullica Township, and Port Republic in Atlantic County; Bass River Township and Washington Township in Burlington County; and Little Egg Harbor Township in Ocean County.

The township is one of 56 South Jersey municipalities that are included within the New Jersey Pinelands National Reserve, a protected natural area of unique ecology covering 1,100,000 acres (450,000 ha), that has been classified as a United States Biosphere Reserve and established by Congress in 1978 as the nation's first National Reserve. Parts of the township are included in the state-designated Pinelands Area, which includes portions of Atlantic County, along with areas in Burlington, Camden, Cape May, Cumberland, Gloucester, and Ocean counties.

== Demographics ==
Historical population
Census	Pop.	Note	%±
1810	1,648		—
1820	1,895		15.0%
1830	2,960		56.2%
1840	2,208	*	−25.4%
1850	2,307		4.5%
1860	2,735	*	18.6%
1870	2,860		4.6%
1880	2,337	*	−18.3%
1890	2,208		−5.5%
1900	2,469		11.8%
1910	1,976	*	−20.0%
1920	2,115		7.0%
1930	3,416		61.5%
1940	3,457		1.2%
1950	4,140		19.8%
1960	5,634		36.1%
1970	8,276		46.9%
1980	12,176		47.1%
1990	23,330		91.6%
2000	31,209		33.8%
2010	37,349		19.7%
2020	37,813		1.2%
2023 (est.)	37,876		0.2%
Population sources: 1810–1920 1810–1830; 1840–2000 1840 1850–1870; 1850 1870 1880–1890; 1890–1910 1910–1930; 1940–2000 2000; 2010 2020 * = Lost territory in previous decade.

=== 2010 census ===
The 2010 United States census counted 37,349 people, 13,067 households, and 9,173 families in the township. The population density was 419.3 per square mile (161.9/km^{2}). There were 14,132 housing units at an average density of 158.7 per square mile (61.3/km^{2}). The racial makeup was 71.92% (26,860) White, 11.44% (4,271) Black or African American, 0.27% (99) Native American, 10.02% (3,744) Asian, 0.02% (9) Pacific Islander, 3.39% (1,266) from other races, and 2.95% (1,100) from two or more races. Hispanic or Latino of any race were 10.05% (3,752) of the population.

Of the 13,067 households, 31.6% had children under the age of 18; 51.5% were married couples living together; 13.6% had a female householder with no husband present and 29.8% were non-families. Of all households, 23.2% were made up of individuals and 9.0% had someone living alone who was 65 years of age or older. The average household size was 2.64 and the average family size was 3.12.

21.3% of the population were under the age of 18, 14.3% from 18 to 24, 22.5% from 25 to 44, 28.1% from 45 to 64, and 13.7% who were 65 years of age or older. The median age was 38.6 years. For every 100 females, the population had 90.1 males. For every 100 females ages 18 and older there were 86.8 males.

The Census Bureau's 2006–2010 American Community Survey showed that (in 2010 inflation-adjusted dollars) median household income was $65,908 (with a margin of error of +/− $3,931) and the median family income was $76,106 (+/− $2,675). Males had a median income of $50,516 (+/− $3,544) versus $40,663 (+/− $2,096) for females. The per capita income for the township was $24,302 (+/− $2,134). About 5.0% of families and 6.6% of the population were below the poverty line, including 9.3% of those under age 18 and 4.5% of those age 65 or over.

=== 2000 census ===
As of the 2000 census, there were 31,209 people, 10,772 households, and 7,680 families residing in the township. The population density was 344.9 inhabitants per square mile (133.2/km^{2}). There were 11,406 housing units at an average density of 126.1 per square mile (48.7/km^{2}). The racial makeup of the township was 77.16% White, 9.80% African American, 0.24% Native American, 8.00% Asian, 0.05% Pacific Islander, 2.59% from other races, and 2.16% from two or more races. Hispanic or Latino of any race were 6.16% of the population.

There were 10,772 households, out of which 38.4% had children under the age of 18 living with them, 54.5% were married couples living together, 12.4% had a female householder with no husband present, and 28.7% were non-families. 21.5% of all households were made up of individuals, and 6.6% had someone living alone who was 65 years of age or older. The average household size was 2.70 and the average family size was 3.18.

In the township the population was spread out, with 25.8% under the age of 18, 13.6% from 18 to 24, 30.9% from 25 to 44, 20.7% from 45 to 64, and 9.1% who were 65 years of age or older. The median age was 34 years. For every 100 females, there were 92.4 males. For every 100 females age 18 and over, there were 89.1 males.

The median income for a household in the township was $51,595, and the median income for a family was $57,156. Males had a median income of $38,048 versus $31,167 for females. The per capita income for the township was $21,048. About 4.4% of families and 6.6% of the population were below the poverty line, including 6.8% of those under age 18 and 11.9% of those age 65 or over.

== Government ==
=== Local government ===
Galloway Township operates under the Faulkner Act (formally known as the Optional Municipal Charter Law) within Plan E of the Council-Manager form of New Jersey municipal government, implemented based on the recommendations of a Charter Study Commission as of January 1, 1976. The township is one of 42 municipalities (of the 564) statewide that use this form of government. The governing body is the Township Council, which is comprised of seven members who are elected at-large in partisan elections to four-year terms of office on a staggered basis, with an election in odd-numbered years in which either three or four seats come up for vote on an alternating basis as part of the November general election. At an annual reorganization meeting after each election, members of Council select one of their members to take the office of Mayor and another to serve as Deputy Mayor, who serve two-year terms in that office. The Township Council is led by a Mayor whose role is to preside over meetings and sign certain documents on behalf of the township. The Council sets policy for the township as its governing body, with the day-to-day operation of the Township and its municipal services delegated to the Township Manager.

As of 2026, the members of Galloway Township Council are Mayor Anthony Coppola (R, term as mayor ends December 31, 2027 and on council ends December 31, 2027), Deputy Mayor Tony DiPietro (R, term as deputy mayor ends 2027 and on council ends 2027), R.J. Amato III (R, 2029), Rich Clute (R, 2027), Rosemary Goldberg (D, 2029), Christine Jordan (R, 2029), Joyce Pratt (D, 2029).

=== Federal, state and county representation ===
Galloway Township is located in the 2nd Congressional District and is part of New Jersey's 2nd state legislative district.

For the 119th United States Congress, New Jersey's 2nd congressional district is represented by Jeff Van Drew (R, Dennis Township). New Jersey is represented in the United States Senate by Democrats Cory Booker (Newark, term ends 2027) and Andy Kim (Moorestown, term ends 2031).

For the 2026–2027 session, the 2nd legislative district of the New Jersey Legislature is represented in the New Jersey Senate by Vincent J. Polistina (R, Egg Harbor Township) and in the General Assembly by Don Guardian (R, Atlantic City) and Maureen Rowan (D, Atlantic City).

Atlantic County is governed by a directly elected county executive and a nine-member Board of County Commissioners, responsible for legislation. The executive serves a four-year term and the commissioners are elected to staggered three-year terms, of which four are elected from the county on an at-large basis and five of the commissioners represent equally populated districts. As of 2025, Atlantic County's Executive is Dennis Levinson (R, Northfield), whose term of office ends December 31, 2027. Members of the Board of County Commissioners are:

Ernest D. Coursey (D, District 1-- Atlantic City, Egg Harbor Township (part), Longport, Margate City, and Ventnor City; 2025, Atlantic City), Chair Maureen Kern (R, District 2-- Egg Harbor Township (part), Linwood, Northfield, Somers Point and Pleasantville; 2027, Somers Point), Andrew Parker III (R, District 3-- Egg Harbor Township (part) and Hamilton Township (part); 2026, Egg Harbor Township), Richard R. Dase (R, District 4, including Brigantine, Galloway Township, Egg Harbor Township (part), and Port Republic; 2025, Galloway Township), Vice Chair James A. Bertino (R, District 5-- Buena, Buena Vista Township, Corbin City, Egg Harbor City, Estell Manor, Folsom, Hamilton Township (part), Hammonton, Mullica Township and Weymouth Township; 2027, Hammonton), June Byrnes (R, At-Large; 2026, Linwood), Michael Ruffu (R, At-Large; Margate, 2027) Amy L. Gatto (R, At-large; 2025, Hamilton Township) and John W. Risley (R, At-Large; 2026, Egg Harbor Township)

Atlantic County's constitutional officers are: Clerk Joesph J. Giralo (R, 2026, Hammonton), Sheriff Joe O'Donoghue (R, 2026, Egg Harbor Township) and Surrogate James Curcio (R, 2025, Hammonton).

=== Politics ===
As of March 2011, there were a total of 22,037 registered voters in Galloway Township, of which 5,897 (26.8% vs. 30.5% countywide) were registered as Democrats, 5,214 (23.7% vs. 25.2%) were registered as Republicans and 10,913 (49.5% vs. 44.3%) were registered as Unaffiliated. There were 13 voters registered as Libertarians or Greens. Among the township's 2010 Census population, 59.0% (vs. 58.8% in Atlantic County) were registered to vote, including 75.0% of those ages 18 and over (vs. 76.6% countywide).

Gubernatorial election results for Galloway Township
Year	Republican		Democratic		Third party(ies)	
Year	No.	%	No.	%	No.	%
2025	6,925	47.77%	7,503	51.76%	69	0.48%
2021	6,572	56.21%	5,057	43.25%	63	0.54%
2017	3,811	44.59%	4,549	53.22%	187	2.19%
2013	6,337	65.85%	3,171	32.95%	115	1.20%
2009	5,226	50.88%	4,409	42.93%	636	6.19%
2005	4,092	46.05%	4,511	50.77%	283	3.18%

In the 2012 presidential election, Democrat Barack Obama received 8,707 votes here (54.7% vs. 57.9% countywide), ahead of Republican Mitt Romney with 6,935 votes (43.6% vs. 41.1%) and other candidates with 190 votes (1.2% vs. 0.9%), among the 15,918 ballots cast by the township's 23,413 registered voters, for a turnout of 68.0% (vs. 65.8% in Atlantic County). In the 2008 presidential election, Democrat Barack Obama received 8,823 votes here (53.4% vs. 56.5% countywide), ahead of Republican John McCain with 7,361 votes (44.6% vs. 41.6%) and other candidates with 177 votes (1.1% vs. 1.1%), among the 16,515 ballots cast by the township's 22,944 registered voters, for a turnout of 72.0% (vs. 68.1% in Atlantic County). In the 2004 presidential election, Republican George W. Bush received 7,040 votes here (49.4% vs. 46.2% countywide), ahead of Democrat John Kerry with 6,960 votes (48.8% vs. 52.0%) and other candidates with 112 votes (0.8% vs. 0.8%), among the 14,256 ballots cast by the township's 19,036 registered voters, for a turnout of 74.9% (vs. 69.8% in the whole county).

Presidential elections results
Year	Republican	Democratic	Third Parties
2024	51.4% 9,788	46.6% 8,865	2.0% 302
2020	48.1% 9,665	50.5% 10,143	1.4% 286
2016	47.4% 7,290	48.7% 7,486	3.9% 592
2012	43.6% 6,935	54.7% 8,707	1.2% 190
2008	44.6% 7,361	53.4% 8,823	1.1% 177
2004	49.4% 7,040	48.8% 6,960	0.8% 112

In the 2013 gubernatorial election, Republican Chris Christie received 6,337 votes here (64.6% vs. 60.0% countywide), ahead of Democrat Barbara Buono with 3,171 votes (32.3% vs. 34.9%) and other candidates with 115 votes (1.2% vs. 1.3%), among the 9,815 ballots cast by the township's 24,012 registered voters, yielding a 40.9% turnout (vs. 41.5% in the county). In the 2009 gubernatorial election, Republican Chris Christie received 5,226 votes here (50.4% vs. 47.7% countywide), ahead of Democrat Jon Corzine with 4,409 votes (42.5% vs. 44.5%), Independent Chris Daggett with 531 votes (5.1% vs. 4.8%) and other candidates with 105 votes (1.0% vs. 1.2%), among the 10,379 ballots cast by the township's 22,353 registered voters, yielding a 46.4% turnout (vs. 44.9% in the county).

United States Senate election results for Galloway Township1
Year	Republican		Democratic		Third party(ies)	
Year	No.	%	No.	%	No.	%
2024	8,984	50.13%	8,569	47.81%	370	2.06%
2018	5,836	50.10%	5,359	46.01%	453	3.89%
2012	6,381	42.68%	8,299	55.50%	272	1.82%
2006	4,264	49.83%	4,146	48.45%	147	1.72%

United States Senate election results for Galloway Township2
Year	Republican		Democratic		Third party(ies)	
Year	No.	%	No.	%	No.	%
2020	9,308	47.48%	9,892	50.46%	402	2.05%
2014	4,167	50.11%	4,008	48.20%	140	1.68%
2013	2,889	51.41%	2,685	47.78%	45	0.80%
2008	6,770	44.22%	8,306	54.26%	233	1.52%

== Education ==
For pre-kindergarten through eighth grade, students attend the Galloway Township Public Schools. As of the 2021–22 school year, the district, comprised of six schools, had an enrollment of 3,164 students and 304.5 classroom teachers (on an FTE basis), for a student–teacher ratio of 10.4:1. Schools in the district (with 2021–22 enrollment data from the National Center for Education Statistics) are Pomona Preschool with 90 students in grades PreK, Arthur Rann Elementary School with 658 students in grades K-6, Reeds Road Elementary School with 498 students in grades K-6, Roland Rogers Elementary School with 522 students in grades K-6, Smithville Elementary School with 562 students in grades K-6 and Galloway Township Middle School with 729 students in grades 7–8.

Public school students in ninth through twelfth grades attend Absegami High School, located in the township. As of the 2021–22 school year, the high school had an enrollment of 1,169 students and 102.2 classroom teachers (on an FTE basis), for a student–teacher ratio of 11.4:1. Students in the western portion of the township have the option of attending Cedar Creek High School in neighboring Egg Harbor City under the school of choice program. Both high schools are part of the Greater Egg Harbor Regional High School District, a regional public high school district serving students from the constituent districts of Egg Harbor City, Galloway Township, Hamilton Township and Mullica Township. The district also serves students from the districts of the City of Port Republic and Washington Township (in Burlington County) as part of sending/receiving relationships. Seats on the nine-member board are allocated based on the population of the constituent municipalities, with four seats assigned to Galloway Township.

Township public school students are also eligible to attend the Atlantic County Institute of Technology in the Mays Landing section of Hamilton Township or the Charter-Tech High School for the Performing Arts, located in Somers Point.

The Galloway Community Charter School was a public school that served students in kindergarten through eighth grade. The school, which drew students from across Atlantic County, operated independently of the Galloway Township Public Schools under a charter issued by the New Jersey Department of Education. There was no tuition charged; costs were paid on a per-student basis by each of the sending districts, with additional funding provided by the State of New Jersey. Opened in 1997 among the state's first group of charter schools, the school's charter was revoked due to low scores on standardized tests and the school closed at the end of the 2014–2015 school year.

Assumption Regional Catholic School is a Catholic elementary school for pre-kindergarten through eighth grades with a specially designed middle school system, operated under the jurisdiction of the Diocese of Camden and serving students from the sending parishes of Our Lady of Perpetual Help Parish (in Galloway Township), St. Thomas the Apostle Church (Brigantine) and St. Elizabeth Ann Seton Parish (Absecon). The school had been located in Pomona, and moved in September 2007 to another campus elsewhere in the township.

Stockton University is a four-year liberal arts university located in the Pomona section of the township.

Galloway Township is served by Atlantic Cape Community College, a public community college in Atlantic and Cape May counties, with more than 8,000 students enrolled. Its main campuses are in the Mays Landing section of Hamilton Township, Atlantic City, and Cape May Court House.

== Transportation ==
=== Roads and highways ===
As of May 2010, the township had a total of 253.48 miles (407.94 km) of roadways, of which 171.70 miles (276.32 km) were maintained by the municipality, 59.44 miles (95.66 km) by Atlantic County and 16.66 miles (26.81 km) by the New Jersey Department of Transportation and 5.68 miles (9.14 km) by the New Jersey Turnpike Authority.

The Garden State Parkway passes through the township, extending 5.7 miles (9.2 km) from Egg Harbor Township in the south to Port Republic in the north. Included in the township are Interchange 40 for U.S. Route 30 White Horse Pike East, Interchange 41 for Route 561 Jimmie Leeds Road, and Interchange 44 for Route 575 Pomona. It was on this stretch of the Parkway that Governor of New Jersey Jon Corzine was involved in a serious accident on April 12, 2007.

Also passing through the township are Route 50 and U.S. Route 30, along with CR 561, CR 561 Alternate, CR 563 and CR 575.

=== Public transportation ===
NJ Transit provides bus service to Atlantic City on routes 508 (from the Hamilton Mall), 554 (from Lindenwold station) and 559 (from Lakewood Township).

== Notable people ==
People who were born in, residents of, or otherwise closely associated with Galloway Township include:

- Abdullah Anderson (born 1996), American football defensive tackle for the Chicago Bears of the National Football League
- Nessa Barrett (born 2002), singer-songwriter, whose song "I Hope Ur Miserable Until Ur Dead" entered the US Billboard Hot 100 at number 88 in August 2021
- Tabitha D'umo (born 1973), choreographer and creative director
- Shereef Elnahal (born 1985), physician who has served as 21st Commissioner of the New Jersey Department of Health
- Vera King Farris (1938–2009), third president of Richard Stockton College of New Jersey (now Stockton University), serving from 1983 to 2003
- Anne Grunow (born c. 1959), senior research scientist at Ohio State University in the Byrd Polar Research Center
- Elias Higbee (1795–1843), associate of Joseph Smith, and an official historian and recorder in the Church of Jesus Christ of Latter Day Saints
- Albert Hoffman (1915–1993), painter and wood carver
- Mike Isgro (born c. 1988), college football coach who is head coach of the Delaware Valley University football team
- Larry James (1947–2008), gold medalist at the 1968 Summer Olympics
- Fred Jerkins III, music producer who works with his brother Rodney
- Rodney Jerkins (born 1977), music producer and owner of the DarkChild recording studio
- Austin Johnson (born 1994), defensive lineman who plays for the Los Angeles Chargers
- Enoch "Nucky" Johnson (1883–1968), Atlantic City political boss and racketeer
- Brett Kennedy (born 1994), professional baseball pitcher who played in MLB for the San Diego Padres
- Mushond Lee (born 1967), actor who appeared on The Cosby Show and in the film Lean on Me
- Samuel Ojserkis (born 1990), rower who competed in the men's eight event at the 2016 Summer Olympics
- Ford Palmer (born 1990), professional middle-distance runner who specializes in the 1500 meters and the mile
- Vincent J. Polistina (born 1971), member of the New Jersey General Assembly who represented the 2nd Legislative District from 2008 to 2012
- Myron Rolle (born 1986), neurosurgeon and former American football player for the Tennessee Titans and Pittsburgh Steelers
- Nicky Scarfo Jr. (born 1964), former Philadelphia crime family boss and Lucchese crime family soldier
- Jim Schultz (born 1972), Associate White House Counsel for U.S. President Donald J. Trump
- Erica Skroski (born 1994), soccer player who plays as a defender for Sky Blue FC in the NWSL

== Points of interest ==
- Edwin B. Forsythe National Wildlife Refuge, whose headquarters and visitor center are located in the township.
- Galloway National Golf Club, designed by Tom Fazio, has been recognized by Golf Digest as one of its Best New Courses of 1994.
- Historic Smithville and Village Greene
- Renault Winery
- Stockton Seaview Hotel and Golf Club, hosted the 1942 PGA Championship and was host of the ShopRite LPGA Classic in 1986–87, from 1998 to 2006 and again starting in 2010.
- Sylvin Farms Winery
