= With or Without You (2003 film) =

- Directed by: G. Stubbs
- Written by: Bobby Thompson
- Produced by: Anita M. Cal; Bobby Thompson; G. Stubbs; Guy A. Young; Lisa Diane Washington
- Starring: Cynda Williams; Guy Torry; Maurice Smith; Mushond Lee; Victor Williams
- Narrated by: Mushond Lee
- Cinematography: Keith L. Smith
- Edited by: G. Stubbs
- Music by: Ivan Graham
- Distributed by: Screen Media Films
- Release date: May 11, 2003
- Running time: 88 minutes
- Country: United States
- Language: English

With or Without You is a 2003 comedy drama film directed by G. Stubbs and starring Cynda Williams, Victor Williams, Mushond Lee, and Wendy Raquel Robinson. The film was produced by Anita M. Cal and Lisa Diane Washington in Los Angeles, CA.

== Plot ==
Robert's (Lee) life has been going just the way he wanted it to, from both a professional and personal standpoint. That is until his girlfriend Cheri (Williams) tells him she's expecting. While she feels they should get married, Robert still isn't quite sure if he's ready to take such a major step in his life. He tries to get advice from his friends, who all (besides not being married or in any sort of exclusive relationships of their own) basically tell him to stand firm in his decision if he doesn't feel he's ready. Cheri also has a group of friends however, and they are just as much in support of her opinion that the two should be looking to settle down as Robert's friends are of his. When they all get together to celebrate the baby shower, tensions inevitably flare, and a few unexpected secrets finally come to light, leading to a frothy and mirthful climax.

== Cast ==
- Cynda Williams as Cheri Fontenot
- Mushond Lee as Robert Hightower
- Dannon Green as Cousin Jacque
- Guy Torry as Greg
- J.B. Smoove as Darnell
- Maia Campbell as Teresa
- Maria de Los Angeles as Maria
- Maurice Smith as Lee
- Nicki Micheaux as Rochelle
- James "Talent" Harris as Eddie
- Victor Williams as Kenneth
- Wendy Raquel Robinson as Serena
