= Atlantic County Utilities Authority =

Public water protection agency

Atlantic County Utilities Authority (ACUA) is a public agency in Atlantic County, New Jersey, that is responsible for enhancing quality of life through the protection of waters and lands from pollution by providing responsible waste management services.

== History ==
The Atlantic County Utilities Authority was formed in the late 1960s by the Atlantic County Board of Freeholders and charged with developing a comprehensive approach to wastewater management. At that time, Atlantic County had more than 20 small, outdated sewage treatment plants, most of which discharged effluent into streams, tidal waters and other surface waters. Over the years, the situation resulted in the degradation of the county's fresh water resources, estuaries and marine environments. With the construction of the Coastal Region Wastewater Treatment Plant in 1978, conditions began to improve. Since that time the system has been expanded to serve the needs of residential and commercial development throughout the county as well as demands placed by increased tourism. As a result, back bays, rivers and streams are now fit for recreational activities such as swimming and fishing.

In June 1981, the Board of Freeholders designated the ACUA as the implementing agency for the Atlantic County Solid Waste Management Plan. Prior to the Freeholders’ action, trash generated in the county had been buried in 46 unlined landfills, which had become a direct threat to our groundwater resources. The Pinelands Commission required that many of these landfills be closed by August 8, 1990. These new environmental regulations, together with New Jersey's Mandatory Recycling Act, necessitated a completely new system of solid waste management in Atlantic County. Starting in 1990, the ACUA established a nationally recognized system to recycle, compost, and dispose of solid waste. A double-lined landfill, recycling center, composting site, transfer station, and ancillary facilities were built on a 360-acre site known as the Howard “Fritz” Haneman Environmental Park.

== Operations ==
=== Wastewater Division ===
ACUA's Wastewater Treatment Facility located in Atlantic City, NJ, currently treats the wastewater of 14 Atlantic County municipalities as well as sludge/biosolids, grease, scum, dried municipal sludge, liquid sludge and leachate from the area.

Located at the plant is a New Jersey-certified water and wastewater environmental testing laboratory that provides analysis to ensure the treatment plant meets and exceeds environmental quality standards set by the New Jersey Department of Environmental. In addition, laboratory services are offered to public entities, including public health agencies, water utilities, wastewater utilities, and school districts. These services include water sampling and sample pick-up services.

The plant operates on the power generated by the Jersey-Atlantic Wind Farm and 500 kilowatt solar project located on the premises.

=== Solid Waste Division ===
==== Recycling ====
ACUA provides recycling collection for the municipalities of Atlantic County, NJ. In 2009, ACUA implemented a single-stream recycling system, which allows residents to dispose of all recyclable materials in one container. In 2021, ACUA began a partnership with Mazza Recycling Services. Recycling generated in Atlantic County is brought to ACUA's Recycling Center. All materials are shipped to Mazza Recycling Services' state-of-the-art sorting facility in Monmouth County, New Jersey. Here, recyclables are sorted, baled and shipped to end market companies throughout the United States and internationally.

==== Transfer Station and Landfill ====
ACUA's transfer station and landfill is located in Egg Harbor Township at its 360-acre Howard “Fritz” Haneman Environmental Park. “The landfill's first section, or cell, was constructed in 1991. Today, the landfill covers more than 100 acres and is 145 feet high. Based on current operating procedures and regulations the landfill is expected to be accepting waste through 2026.

Since Atlantic County is located in a coastal area, the landfill is built above ground with a double-liner system to prevent the possibility of contamination of the environment and groundwater from waste.

The landfill accepts materials such as construction and demolition debris, bulky waste and municipal solid waste. Because of its proximity to the Atlantic City Airport, ACUA landfills its municipal solid waste at night to deter the activity of birds.

Metal items, including refrigerators and appliances, as well as carpeting and tires are recycled after being dropped off at the ACUA's transfer station.

==== Composting & EcoProducts ====
Yard waste that is collected at ACUA's composting facility or through municipal collections is ground up and placed into windrows – rows of material about six feet high and 500 feet long – to decompose. It is turned weekly to aid in the decomposition process and control odors. After curing for approximately six months, the material is processed and used to create ACUA's EcoSoil™.

== Renewable Energy Projects ==
=== Jersey-Atlantic Wind Farm ===
ACUA is home to the first wind farm in New Jersey and the country's first coastal wind project, the Jersey-Atlantic Wind Farm, which is located at its Wastewater Treatment Plant in Atlantic City. The ACUA partnered with Community Energy Inc. to build the farm, which consists of five turbines that can generate up to 7.5 megawatts of power. On average, the electricity produced from the wind farm satisfies about 57 to 60 percent of the Wastewater Plant's total energy needs.

=== Solar Energy ===
In partnership with World Water & Power Corporation and Alternite Power, a 500 kilowatt solar electric project consisting of 2,700 solar panels was installed at the ACUA Wastewater Treatment Plant. Built in 2005, the system is estimated to produce more than 600,000 kilowatt hours of electricity annually.

=== Landfill Gas to Energy ===
ACUA previously captured landfill gas and turned it into energy onsite which powered the entire Environmental Park with excess energy provided to the grid where it can be used to power area homes and businesses. The project saved ratepayers more than $8.5 million while in operation and prevented more than 25,602 metric tons of CO_{2} from entering the atmosphere.

ACUA and South Jersey Industries will partner on a new project that will convert landfill gas into pipeline-quality renewable natural gas. The project will remove hydrogen sulfide and other impurities from the landfill gas then feed it into the natural gas distribution network that supplies area homes, businesses, and compressed natural gas (CNG) vehicle fueling stations. Construction is expected to begin in Summer 2023.

=== Green Vehicle Wash ===
ACUA operates a vehicle wash powered by 100% renewable energy, which is open to public and private fleets for use. Solar panels heat the wash water and solar lighting illuminates the wash bay. 85% of the water used is recycled for future washes and recycled motor oil is used to heat the facility.

=== Geothermal Heating and Cooling ===
ACUA administrative offices use a geothermal heating and cooling system. The system depends on well water that is heated at a constant temperature of 55 degrees at a depth of 250 feet. Fifty closed-looped wells on a field adjacent to the building provide the water. The system extracts heat from the water in the winter, and in summer, heat is transferred to the ground through the water.

== Alternative Fuel Vehicles ==
=== Compressed Natural Gas (CNG) ===
In October 2010, the first compressed natural gas station in South Jersey built and operated by Clean Energy Fuels opened at ACUA. As a member of the NJ Clean Cities Coalition, ACUA was awarded $1.9 million in funding from the U.S. Department of Energy to offset the cost of constructing the fueling station and purchasing new CNG vehicles. ACUA is currently in the process of switching its entire fleet to CNG.

=== Hybrid and Electric Vehicles ===
ACUA operates various electric and hybrid off-road and on-road vehicles, including a zero-emission Ford Ranger EV, a solar-powered electric vehicle named “Sunny,” four hybrid Ford Escapes, a Nissan Leaf, and a Toyota Prius plug-in hybrid. Vehicles are powered at electric vehicle charging stations, which are fed by the landfill gas, solar and wind renewable energy projects.
