= Jersey-Atlantic Wind Farm =

Farm

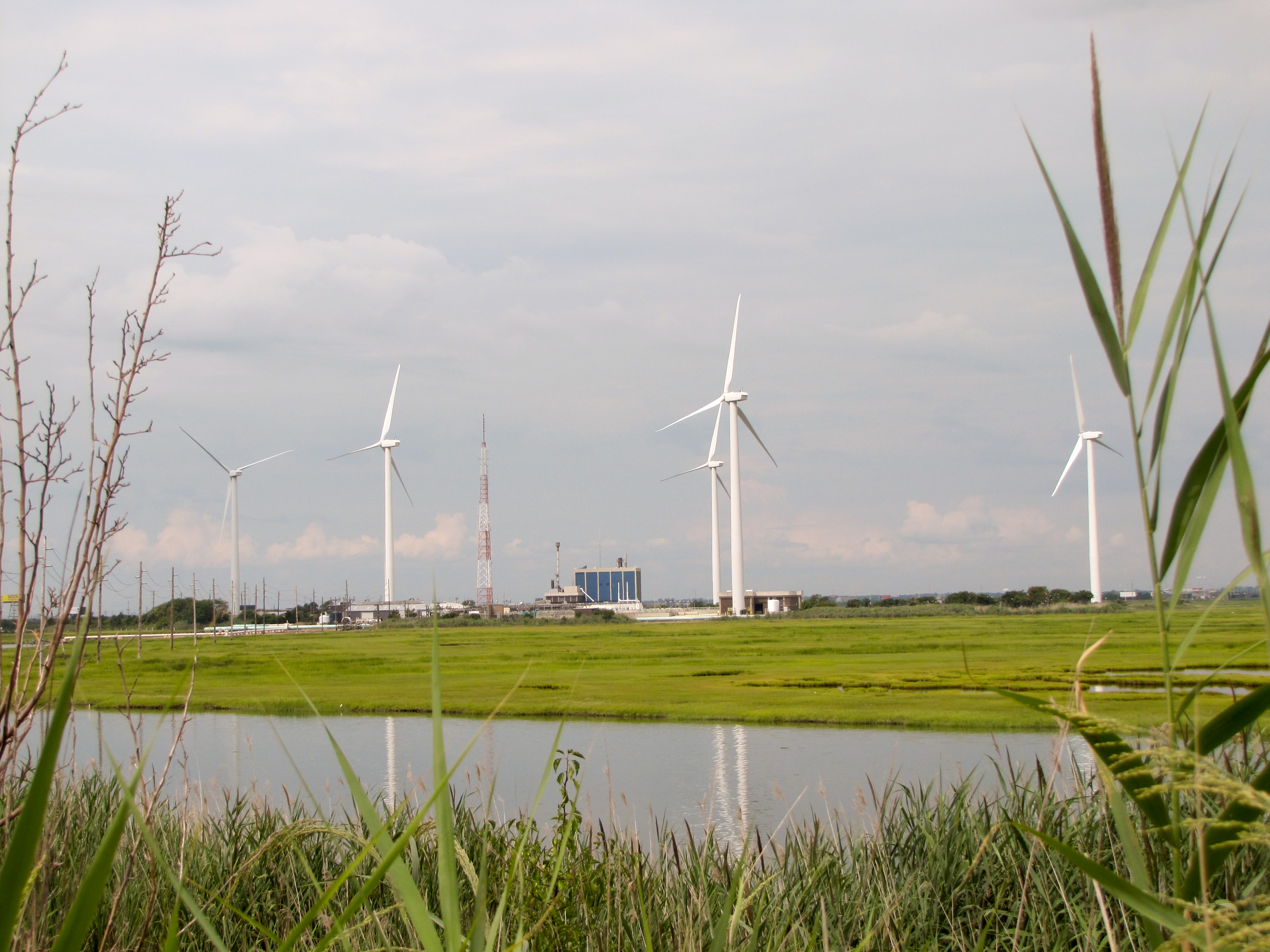
- Jersey-Atlantic Wind Farm in August 2010
- Location of Jersey-Atlantic Wind Farm in New Jersey
- Country: United States
- Location: Atlantic County Utilities Authority Wastewater Treatment Facility, Atlantic City, New Jersey
- Coordinates: 39°22′53″N 74°26′51″W
- Status: Operational
- Commission date: March 2006
- Construction cost: US$12.5 million
- Owners: Leeward Renewable Energy, LLC.

Wind farm
- Type: onshore
- Hub height: 262 ft (80 m)
- Rotor diameter: 240 ft (73 m)
- Rated wind speed: 13–15 mph (21–24 km/h)

Power generation
- Units operational: 5 x 1.5 MW
- Make and model: General Electric
- Nameplate capacity: 7.5 MW

External links
- Website: https://www.acua.com/Projects/Jersey-Atlantic-Wind-Farm.aspx

The Jersey-Atlantic Wind Farm, located in Atlantic City, New Jersey, is the first coastal wind farm in the United States and the first such wind farm in New Jersey. It became operational in March 2006 and has five 1.5 MW turbines built by General Electric. Each wind turbine reaches a height of 380 feet (120 m).

The wind farm is onshore at the Atlantic County Utilities Authority (ACUA) Wastewater Treatment Plant on U.S. Route 30 and is visible from highways approaching Atlantic City. The treatment plant uses approximately 50% of the wind-generated capacity from the wind turbines, providing about 60% of the wastewater plant's electricity needs, with the remaining energy being provided to the main power grid for resale as premium renewable electricity.

ACUA claims that the wind farm has "saved more than $7.3 million in energy costs and prevented 74,777 metric tons of CO2 from entering the atmosphere since its opening."
