= Smithville, Atlantic County, New Jersey =

Populated place in Atlantic County, New Jersey, US

Smithville, New Jersey
- Census-designated place
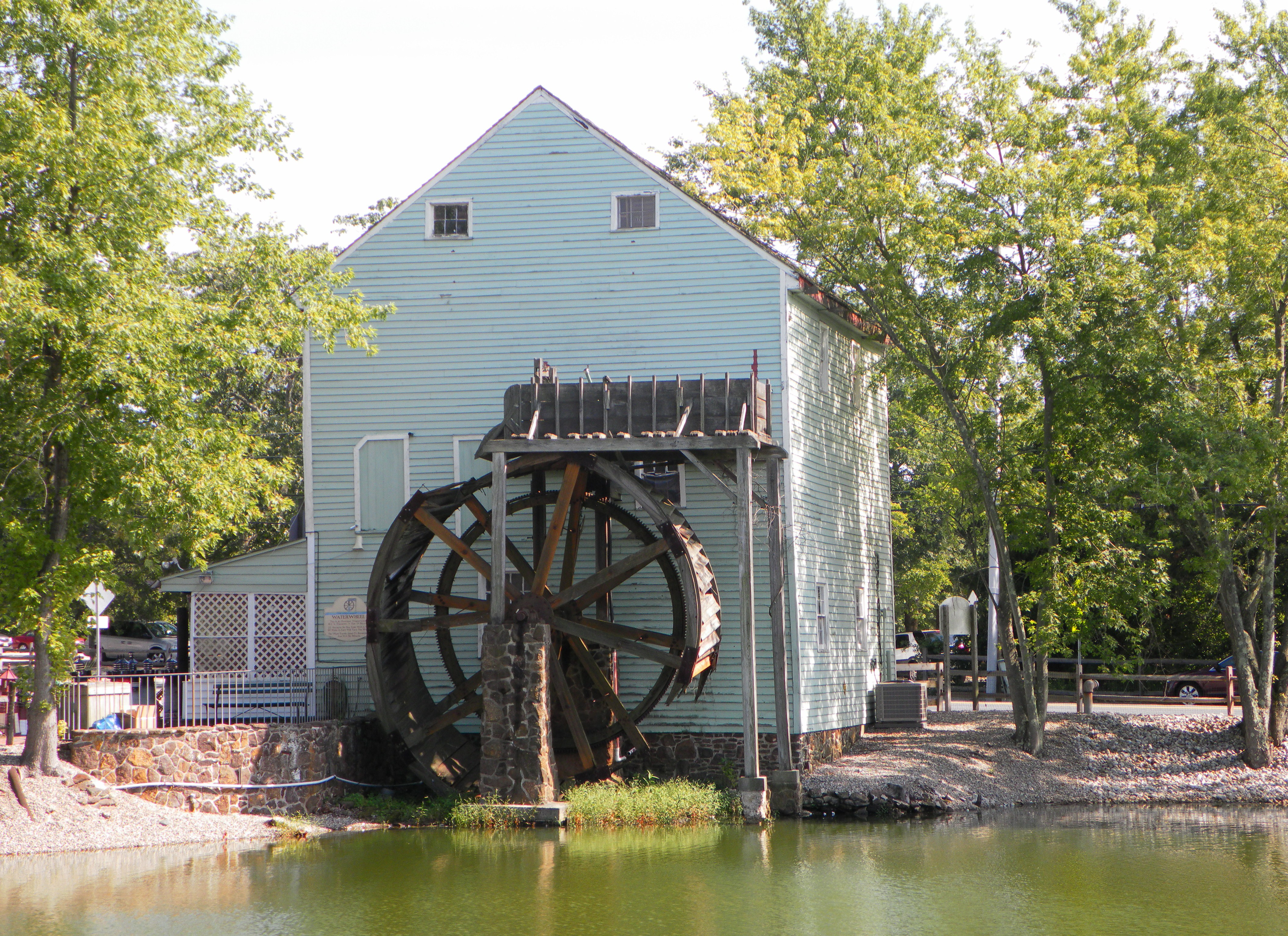
- Oliphant Grist Mill at Smithville Village Greene
- Nickname: Historic Smithville
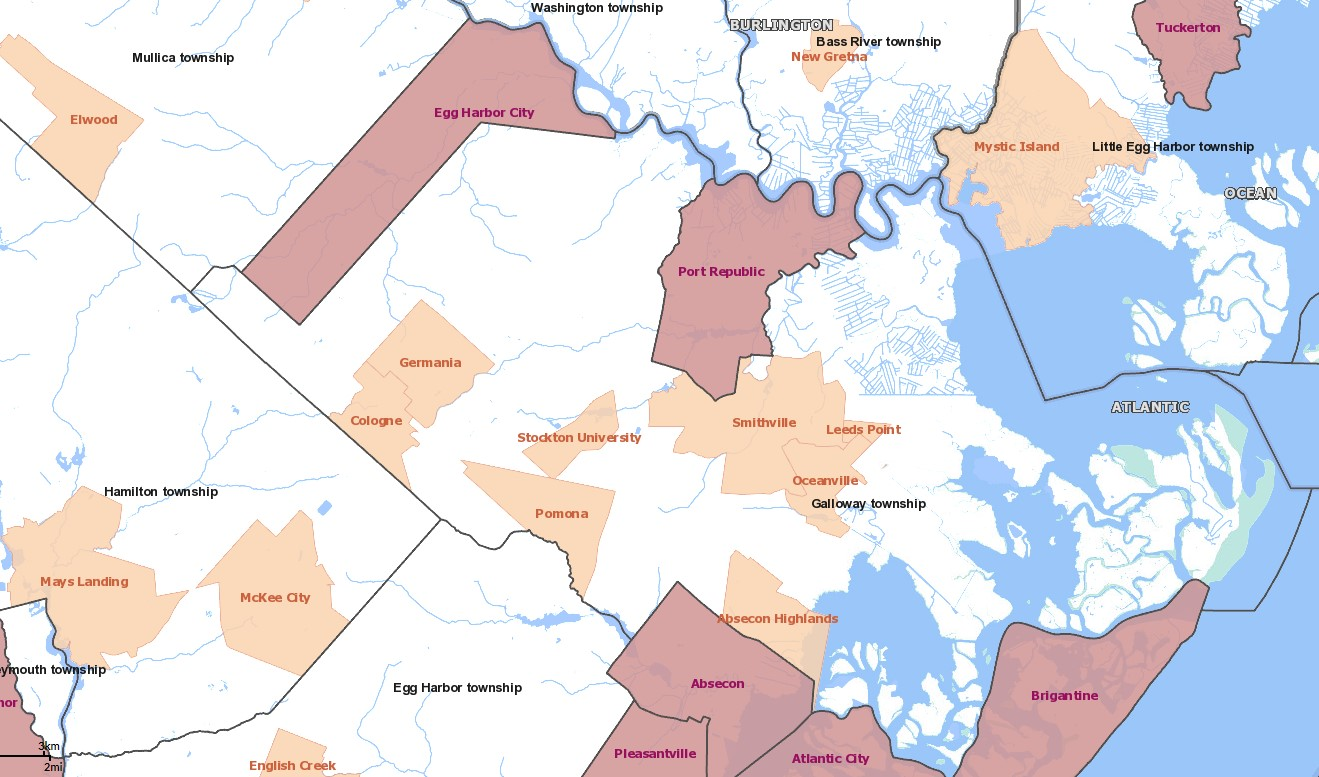

- Location in Atlantic County Location in New Jersey Location in the United States
- Coordinates: 39.494939°N 74.478633°W
- Country: United States
- State: New Jersey
- County: Atlantic
- Township: Galloway

Area
  - Total: 5.054 sq mi (13.091 km^{2})
  - Land: 5.001 sq mi (12.952 km^{2})
  - Water: 0.054 sq mi (0.139 km^{2}) 1.06%
- Elevation: 13 ft (4 m)

Population (2010)
  - Total: 7,242
  - Density: 1,448.2/sq mi (559.2/km^{2})
- Time zone: UTC−05:00 (Eastern (EST))
  - Summer (DST): UTC−04:00 (Eastern (EDT))
- ZIP Codes: 08201, 08205
- Area codes: 609 and 640
- FIPS code: 34-68190
- GNIS feature ID: 02584030
- Website: www.historicsmithville.com

Smithville is an unincorporated community and census-designated place (CDP) located within Galloway Township, in Atlantic County, in the U.S. state of New Jersey, that was established as part of the 2010 United States census. Smithville is located 15 miles (24 km) north of and inland from Atlantic City. As of the 2010 Census, the CDP's population was 7,242.

Although Smithville has existed as a community since the American Revolutionary War, most of the community remained very rural until the 1960s when the Smithville Towne Center, a tourist attraction containing over 80 shops, opened. The Towne Center was expanded to include numerous rides and other shops named "The Village Greene", which was the centerpiece of a large planned community developed since the 1980s.

== History ==
It is in the Smithville in Atlantic County that James Baremore built what is now the Smithville Inn in 1787, a single room along a well-traveled stagecoach route. However, historians debate whether it was originally planned as an inn. The area of Smithville was originally considered part of Leeds / Leeds Point at the time. By 1874 the inn had grown to six times its original size. Its success was well established, but it was eventually abandoned at the turn of the 1900s. In 1952, Ethel and Fred Noyes purchased the inn and restored the building, opening it as a restaurant with 42 seats.

=== Later history ===
Around the 1960s, Ethel and Fred Noyes decided to expand the site into a historical attraction, similar to Colonial Williamsburg. Several historic buildings from around South Jersey were brought to the site, restored, and converted into shops and attractions.

In 1990, the newly formed Smithville Development Company began construction on the second part of the Smithville Towne Center, named "The Village Greene", which includes more stores and other activities, such as paddleboats, miniature golf, a carousel, an old-fashioned steam train, and several other attractions. In addition to The Village Greene, the company embarked on a Planned Unit Development containing 6,800 condominium units on the 2,200-acre (890 ha) site. Due to legal disagreements, the number of units was reduced to 4,000. Soon after, a recession forced the construction to stop in 1991, leaving around 1,600 completed units. In 1995, the remaining land was sold to KHovnanian of Red Bank. KHovnanian reduced the number of planned residences from 2,500 condominium units to a 1,200-unit retirement community. The project was later renamed "Four Seasons at Historic Smithville", which was built in several phases.

== Geography ==
According to the United States Census Bureau, Smithville had a total area of 5.055 square miles (13.091 km^{2}), including 5.001 square miles (12.952 km^{2}) of land and 0.054 square miles (0.139 km^{2}) of water (1.06%).

Smithville is located in the New Jersey Pine Barrens.

== Demographics ==
Historical population
Census	Pop.	Note	%±
2010	7,242		—
2020	9,754		34.7%
Population sources: 2010

Smithville first appeared as a census designated place in the 2010 U.S. census

=== 2020 census ===
Smithville CDP, New Jersey – Racial and ethnic composition Note: the US Census treats Hispanic/Latino as an ethnic category. This table excludes Latinos from the racial categories and assigns them to a separate category. Hispanics/Latinos may be of any race.
Race / Ethnicity (NH = Non-Hispanic)	Pop 2010	Pop 2020	% 2010	% 2020
White alone (NH)	5,299	5,606	73.17%	57.47%
Black or African American alone (NH)	685	1,760	9.46%	18.04%
Native American or Alaska Native alone (NH)	0	1	0.00%	0.01%
Asian alone (NH)	558	700	7.71%	7.18%
Native Hawaiian or Pacific Islander alone (NH)	2	3	0.03%	0.03%
Other race alone (NH)	14	47	0.19%	0.48%
Mixed race or Multiracial (NH)	108	349	1.49%	3.58%
Hispanic or Latino (any race)	576	1,288	7.95%	13.20%
Total	7,242	9,754	100.00%	100.00%

=== 2010 census ===
The 2010 United States census counted 7,242 people, 3,282 households, and 2,084 families in the CDP. The population density was 1,448.2 per square mile (559.2/km^{2}). There were 3,548 housing units at an average density of 709.5 per square mile (273.9/km^{2}). The racial makeup was 77.53% (5,615) White, 10.37% (751) Black or African American, 0.07% (5) Native American, 7.71% (558) Asian, 0.04% (3) Pacific Islander, 2.13% (154) from other races, and 2.15% (156) from two or more races. Hispanic or Latino of any race were 7.95% (576) of the population.

Of the 3,282 households, 19.7% had children under the age of 18; 47.8% were married couples living together; 12.4% had a female householder with no husband present and 36.5% were non-families. Of all households, 29.7% were made up of individuals and 11.1% had someone living alone who was 65 years of age or older. The average household size was 2.21 and the average family size was 2.71.

16.8% of the population were under the age of 18, 6.8% from 18 to 24, 21.0% from 25 to 44, 29.7% from 45 to 64, and 25.6% who were 65 years of age or older. The median age was 48.6 years. For every 100 females, the population had 85.3 males. For every 100 females ages 18 and older there were 83.3 males.

== Transportation ==
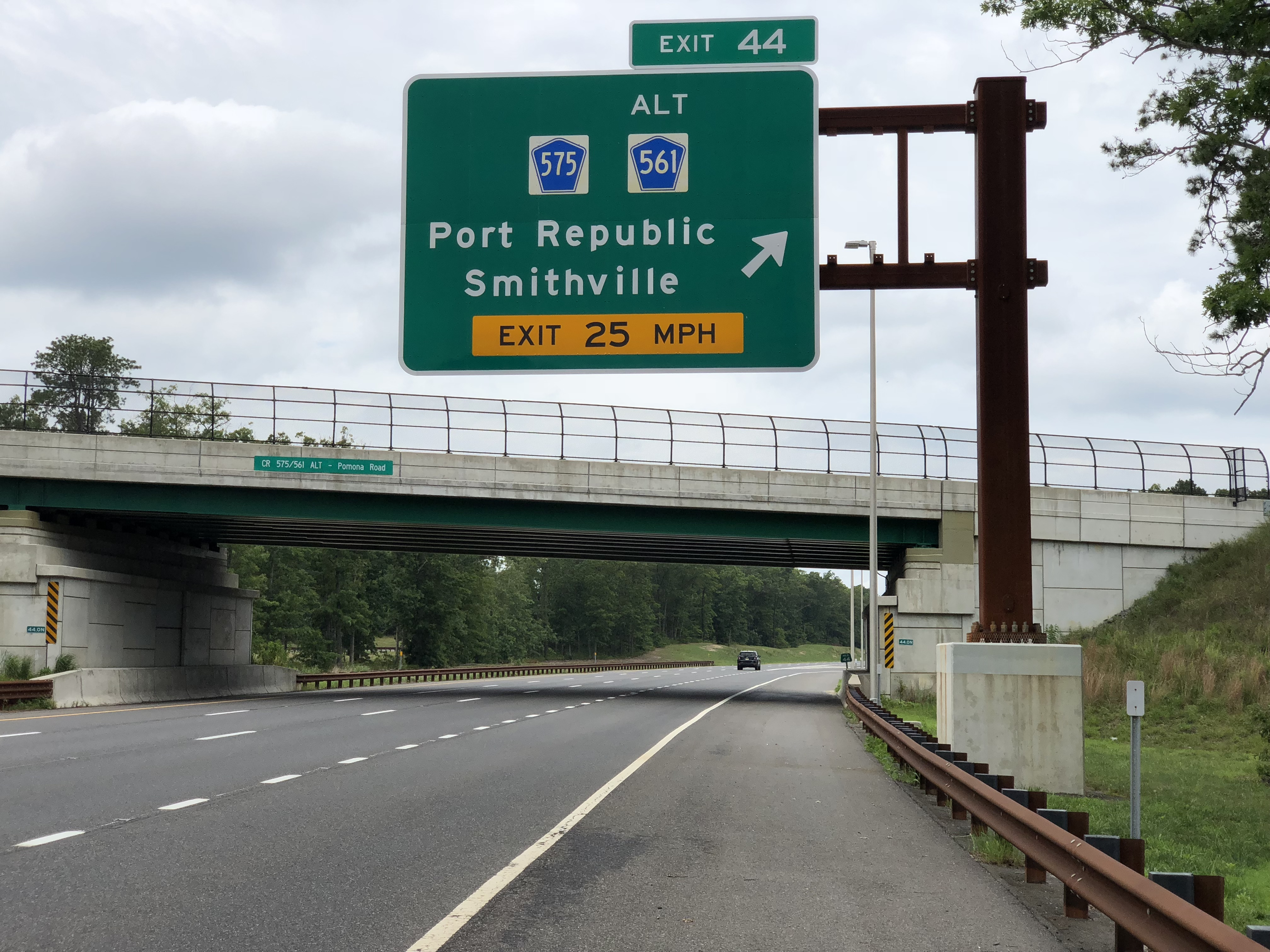
Garden State Parkway northbound at exit 44, serving Smithville

Smithville is accessible via exit 48 of the Garden State Parkway (southbound only) by way of U.S. Route 9 (New York Road) and via exit 44 of the Garden State Parkway (northbound), by following Moss Mill Road (County Route 561 Alternate) east/south.

New Jersey Transit provides bus service to Atlantic City on the 559 route.

== Education ==
The CDP is within two school districts: Galloway Township School District (elementary) and Greater Egg Harbor Regional High School District. The zoned high school for Galloway Township is Absegami High School, which is a part of the Greater Egg Harbor district.

== Notable people ==
People who were born in, residents of, or otherwise closely associated with Smithville include:

- Enoch L. Johnson (1883-1968), political boss, sheriff of Atlantic County, businessman and crime boss, who was most associated with Atlantic City
- Mushond Lee (born 1970), actor who appeared on The Cosby Show and in the film Lean on Me
