= North Trenton, New Jersey =

Populated place in Mercer County, New Jersey, US

North Trenton
- Neighborhood of Trenton
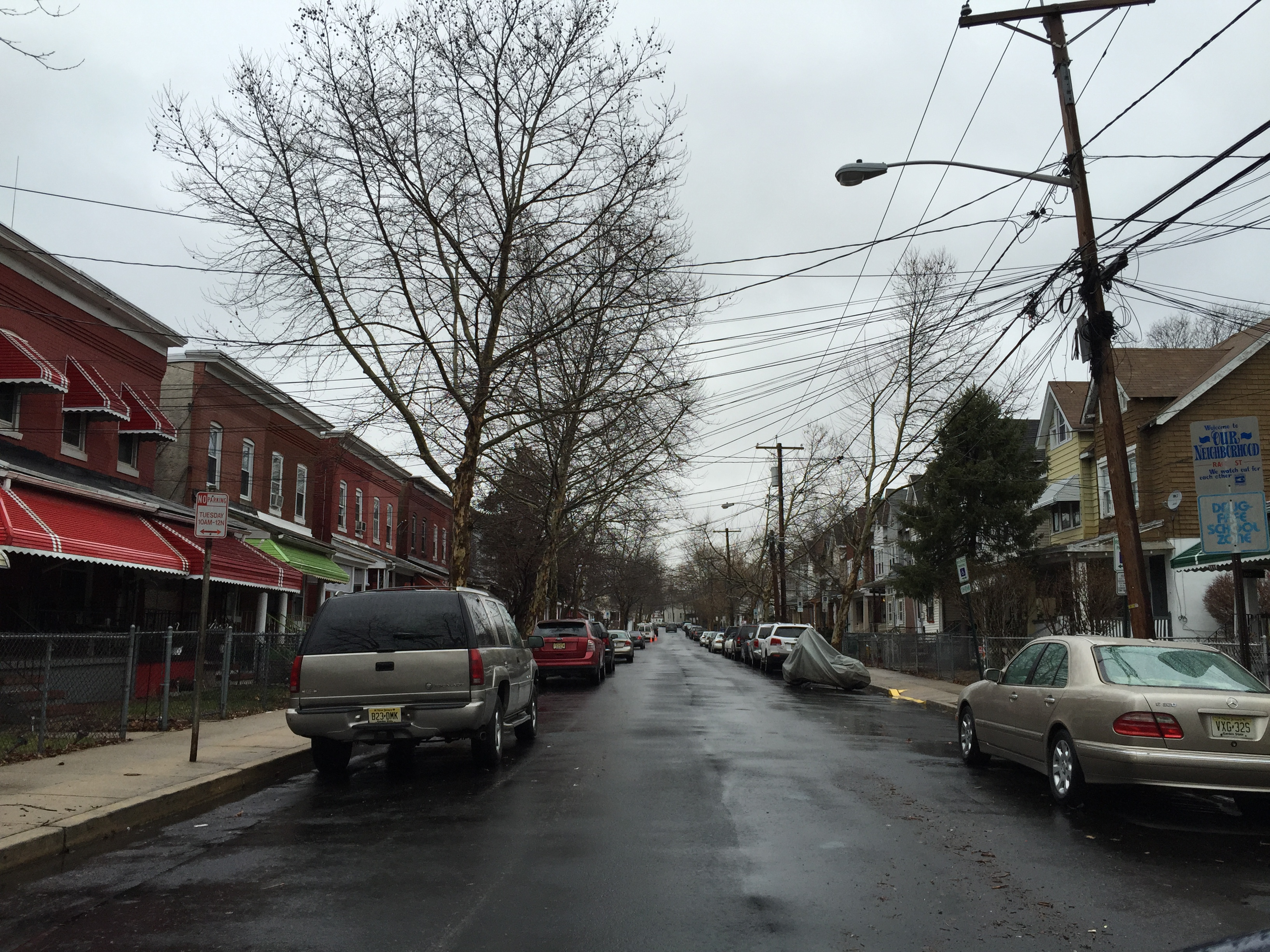
- Race Street in North Trenton.

- Location of North Trenton in Mercer County Inset: Location of county within the state of New Jersey North Trenton (New Jersey) North Trenton (the United States)
- Coordinates: 40°13′55″N 74°45′20″W
- Country: United States
- State: New Jersey
- County: Mercer
- City: Trenton

North Trenton is a neighborhood located within the city of Trenton in Mercer County, in the U.S. state of New Jersey.

== Origin ==
The City of Trenton dates back to the British colonial era, when it was chartered as "a municipality within the royal realm of subjects under the Royal Throne." Boundaries were recorded for the village of Trenton, or Trenton Township, on June 3, 1719. After the American Revolution, Trenton became the capital of New Jersey on November 25, 1790, and the City of Trenton was officially formed within Trenton Township on November 13, 1792. What remained of Trenton Township was absorbed by the city on April 10, 1837. Sections within the city, such as Chambersburg, Wilbur, Stacy's Mill, and Stuyvesant Heights, were autonomous villages or towns eventually absorbed by or annexed to Trenton. Between 1875 and 1900, the city's population and economic base swelled, prompting a revision and consolidation of its boundaries. In 1901, a 'Ward' system, loosely modeled after New York City, was adopted, dividing the city into four distinct units (North, South, East, and West Wards) with their own representatives serving under a single mayor within an elected city council.

== Buildings ==
Until the first decade of the 20th century, much of North Trenton was made up of working farms, orchards, and large estates. After 1910, however, industrial development and population growth led to rapid development. By 1920, the North Ward was home to approximately a quarter of the city's population. North Trenton attracted a large middle-class, professional population, which coincided with the construction of modern, 'planned' neighborhoods situated around parks and green space. Several commercial districts, such as the Five Points (or Battle Monument Square), were established, and thrived from the 1920s to the 1960s. According to a New Jersey Historical Architecture survey, approximately seventy percent of all existing homes and buildings in North Trenton were constructed between 1919 and 1940.

Despite decades of economic decline, North Trenton still boasts a diverse range of noteworthy architecture — again, constructed primarily between 1919 and 1940. This 21-year period constitutes the area's 'golden age'. During this time North Trenton attracted a large middle-class population, and a variety of immigrant groups primarily from southern and eastern Europe. Many of the homes in the area between Brunswick and Princeton Avenues were developed by the British-born builder Samuel Hilton, and are considered architecturally significant.

In the 1930s, project buildings, or federally subsidized housing similar to those in New York City were developed between Brunswick Avenue and Perry Street. The area around the Trenton Battle Monument, the heart of North Trenton, still retains blocks of once-fashionable row-houses built in the Queen Anne and Edwardian styles. The Trenton Orthopedic Hospital, which still stands at the corner of Brunswick and Cavell Avenues, was built in the 1920s and is a superb example of Art Deco style. The hospital served as an important polio treatment center in the 1930s, 40s, and 50s, and continued to operate as such until it was closed in 1970. Many of the buildings in the Battle Monument area were abandoned in the 1960s, and eventually torn down.

== People ==
In the first half of the 20th century, while most of Trenton was segregated or defined by distinct ethnic neighborhoods, North Trenton was one of the few sections of the city where blacks, and whites of all ethnic backgrounds, lived together. North Trenton was regarded as a middle-class 'melting pot' peopled by a vibrant professional class which formed an important economic and cultural foundation for the city. After World War One, North Trenton became a magnet for Polish and Sicilian immigrants. It simultaneously attracted a thriving African-American middle class. The northernmost end of Brunswick Avenue became the heart of a 'Little Poland' district, while Italian neighborhoods emerged just north of the Battle Monument. Spring Street and Pennington Avenue formed the core of a thriving African-American community made up of black professionals who formed a distinct middle-class community unique for that time. North Trenton's diverse catalog of residents also included Russians, Middle-Easterners, Jews, and Anglos of English and Scottish descent. In 1939, a government study recognized North Trenton as one of the most successful and harmonious 'integrated' urban areas in the country, and designated it as a 'model' of economic and social vitality.

In the 1930s, many important African-Americans, such as baseball's Willie Mays, and the writer Harriet Lee, lived in North Trenton. Edna Cuthbert, an African-American clothing designer, operated a successful studio in North Trenton from 1922 to 1954, and made a name for herself as a stylist and designer for many black celebrities of that time, including the singer Lena Horne. African-American painters, poets, and writers organized the North Trenton Round-Table, an arts society that published its own journal and staged theatrical performances from the mid-1920s to the early 1950s. The actor, singer, and social activist Paul Robeson contributed to the Round Table for many years.

An Italian Theater group, The Bond Street Society, was organized in 1928, along with several Italian musical societies. In 1930, the Fanzini School of Dance was organized in North Trenton, and functioned into the 1950s. Many of its students went on to become successful Broadway and Hollywood dancers. Several Polish and Yiddish arts and theater groups also thrived in North Trenton from the 1920s to the early 1960s.

Samuel Alito, the Supreme Court Justice of the United States, was born and raised in North Trenton, as was Norman Schwarzkopf, the commander of U.S. forces in the first Gulf War (1991).

By the late 1960s, however, economic and social changes saw a steady exodus of middle-class families from the North Ward, while numbers of poor migrants from the Southern states filled the vacuum. Racial tensions and economic decline reversed North Trenton's fortunes. The middle-class exodus reached a climax in 1968, when race riots engulfed the Battle Monument area. By the 1970s, the North Ward's population had dropped by over forty percent, and its once-vibrant neighborhoods and business districts were abandoned. Today, the area is considered one of the most economically and socially distressed in the city, and has struggled to rebound from the decline and turmoil of the late 1960s. The Ward is still home to a major medical facility, Capital Health System – Fuld Campus.

Several important sites remaining in North Trenton reflect the area's pre-1968 heyday, such as the Battle Monument (a tall granite shaft modeled after Nelson's Column in London) which commemorates the Revolutionary War victory of Washington's troops over the British. This battle is considered by many historians as the turning point of the American struggle for independence. Several noteworthy churches stand in North Trenton. Our Lady of the Divine Shepherd, built in 1940, was designed by the French-born architect Paul Neas, and served as the only African-American Catholic church in Trenton until it was merged with Blessed Sacrament Parish in 2002. The Polish Falcon Hall, built in 1910, was designed by the Polish-born Frederyk Poszki, a royal architect who fled Russia on the eve of the Communist Revolution. Still standing, it now serves as a community center for Polish immigrants. North Trenton retains a large Polish-American neighborhood that borders Lawrence Township. North Trenton is home to the historic Shiloh Baptist Church, one of the largest churches in the city of Trenton and one of the oldest African American churches in New Jersey, founded in 1888. The Lincoln School, an important example of 1920s Mediterranean Revival architecture, served as a high school for African-American students from 1929 to 1955, and still functions as a middle-school.

Between 1880 and 1950, North Trenton attracted a large number of Polish immigrants. In 1919, a Polish parish was established on Brunswick Avenue by Polish Immigrants, St. Hedwig's Church, considered one of the most aesthetically noteworthy houses of worship in the city, remains a thriving Catholic church. North Trenton is also home to St. Mary's Cathedral, the seat of the Catholic Diocese of Trenton. The current cathedral was completed in 1959 to replace the original, Gothic structure destroyed by fire in 1956.

Between 1899 and 1955, North Trenton was home to one of the only functioning Islamic mosques in New Jersey, founded by immigrants from the Ottoman Empire. A Jewish synagogue also functioned in North Trenton from 1899 to 1959. Both the Muslim and Jewish populations of North Trenton scattered and relocated to the neighboring suburbs of the city in the 1960s.

== Notable people ==
- Joe Plumeri (born 1944), Chairman & CEO of Willis Group Holdings, and owner of the Trenton Thunder
