= Galloway Township Public Schools =

School district in Atlantic County, New Jersey, US

Address
- 101 South Reeds Road Galloway Township, Atlantic County, New Jersey, 08205; United States
- Coordinates: 39.484102°N 74.513348°W

District information
- Grades: pre-K to 8
- Superintendent: Stephen Santilli
- Business administrator: Joy N. Nixon
- Schools: 6

Students and staff
- Enrollment: 3,164 (as of 2021–22)
- Faculty: 304.5 FTEs
- Student–teacher ratio: 10.4:1

Other information
- District Factor Group: CD
- Website: www.gtps.k12.nj.us
Ind.	Per pupil	District spending	Rank (*)	K-8 average	%± vs. average
1A	Total Spending	$17,810	52	$18,891	−5.7%
1	Budgetary Cost	14,547	49	14,159	2.7%
2	Classroom Instruction	9,520	70	8,659	9.9%
6	Support Services	2,158	50	2,167	−0.4%
8	Administrative Cost	1,359	21	1,547	−12.2%
10	Operations & Maintenance	1,438	32	1,612	−10.8%
13	Extracurricular Activities	36	8	104	−65.4%
16	Median Teacher Salary	63,282	58	61,136
Data from NJDoE 2014 Taxpayers' Guide to Education Spending. *Of K-8 districts with more than 750 students. Lowest spending=1; Highest=84

The Galloway Township Public Schools (GTPS) are a community public school district that serves students in pre-kindergarten through eighth grade from Galloway Township, in Atlantic County, in the U.S. state of New Jersey.

As of the 2021–22 school year, the district, comprised of six schools, had an enrollment of 3,164 students and 304.5 classroom teachers (on an FTE basis), for a student–teacher ratio of 10.4:1.

Public school students in ninth through twelfth grades attend Absegami High School, located in the township. As of the 2021–22 school year, the high school had an enrollment of 1,169 students and 102.2 classroom teachers (on an FTE basis), for a student–teacher ratio of 11.4:1. Students in the western portion of the township have the option of attending Cedar Creek High School in neighboring Egg Harbor City under the school of choice program. Both high schools are part of the Greater Egg Harbor Regional High School District, a regional public high school district serving students from the constituent districts of Egg Harbor City, Galloway Township, Hamilton Township and Mullica Township. The district also serves students from the districts of the City of Port Republic and Washington Township (in Burlington County) as part of sending/receiving relationships.

== History ==
In the mid-1990s the student body increased as new employees of casinos moved into the area with their children. The district reached its peak enrollment, 3,975, in the 2002–2003 school year, which it maintained for the subsequent year. Due to the decline in the casino industry, the district began losing students. From 2004 to 2014 enrollment declined by greater than 16%, specifically 639 pupils. From 2006 to 2016, the district's enrollment declined by 600 students.

From 2006 to 2016 there were 60 district job cuts, with nine positions cut in 2016 alone. In 2010 the district proposed cutting 69 jobs. In 2010 the district had proposed closing both pre-kindergarten centers. Additionally between 2006 and 2010 it closed three schools. The numbers of English as a second language and special education students increased by 2016.

The district had been classified by the New Jersey Department of Education as being in District Factor Group "CD", the sixth-highest of eight groupings. District Factor Groups organize districts statewide to allow comparison by common socioeconomic characteristics of the local districts. From lowest socioeconomic status to highest, the categories are A, B, CD, DE, FG, GH, I and J.

Former schools include:

- Cologne Elementary School
  - The student attendance boundaries changed in 2004 and it closed in 2005. It was smaller compared to most district schools.
- Oceanville Kindergarten Learning Center
  - Formerly Oceanville School, which opened around 1927. It closed in 2010. The facility now houses GTPS facilities such as the food service department.
- South Egg Harbor Elementary School
  - The student attendance boundaries changed in 2004 and it closed in 2005. It was smaller compared to most district schools.

== Schools ==
Schools in the district (with 2021–22 enrollment data from the National Center for Education Statistics) are:

Preschool

- Pomona Preschool with 90 students in grades PreK
  - It became preschool only in 2010.

Elementary schools

- Arthur Rann Elementary School with 658 students in grades K-6
  - Ken Berardis, principal
  - Originally established as an elementary school, it became Arthur Rann Middle School (ARMS) at a later point, but changed back into an elementary school when the current middle school opened.
- Reeds Road Elementary School with 498 students in grades K-6
  - Don Gross, principal
- Roland Rogers Elementary School with 522 students in grades K-6
  - Kevin Lightcap, principal
- Smithville Elementary School with 562 students in grades K-6
  - David Ragazzi, principal

Middle school

- Galloway Township Middle School with 729 students in grades 7–8
  - It opened due to an increase of students in the 1990s. In 2000 it had about 900 students and it had about 990 in 2002.
  - Paula Junker, principal

== Administration ==
Core members of the district's administration are:

- Stephen Santilli, superintendent
- Joy N. Nixon, business administrator and board secretary

== Board of education ==
The district's board of education, comprised of nine members, sets policy and oversees the fiscal and educational operation of the district through its administration. As a Type II school district, the board's trustees are elected directly by voters to serve three-year terms of office on a staggered basis, with three seats up for election each year held (since 2012) as part of the November general election. The board appoints a superintendent to oversee the district's day-to-day operations and a business administrator to supervise the business functions of the district.
