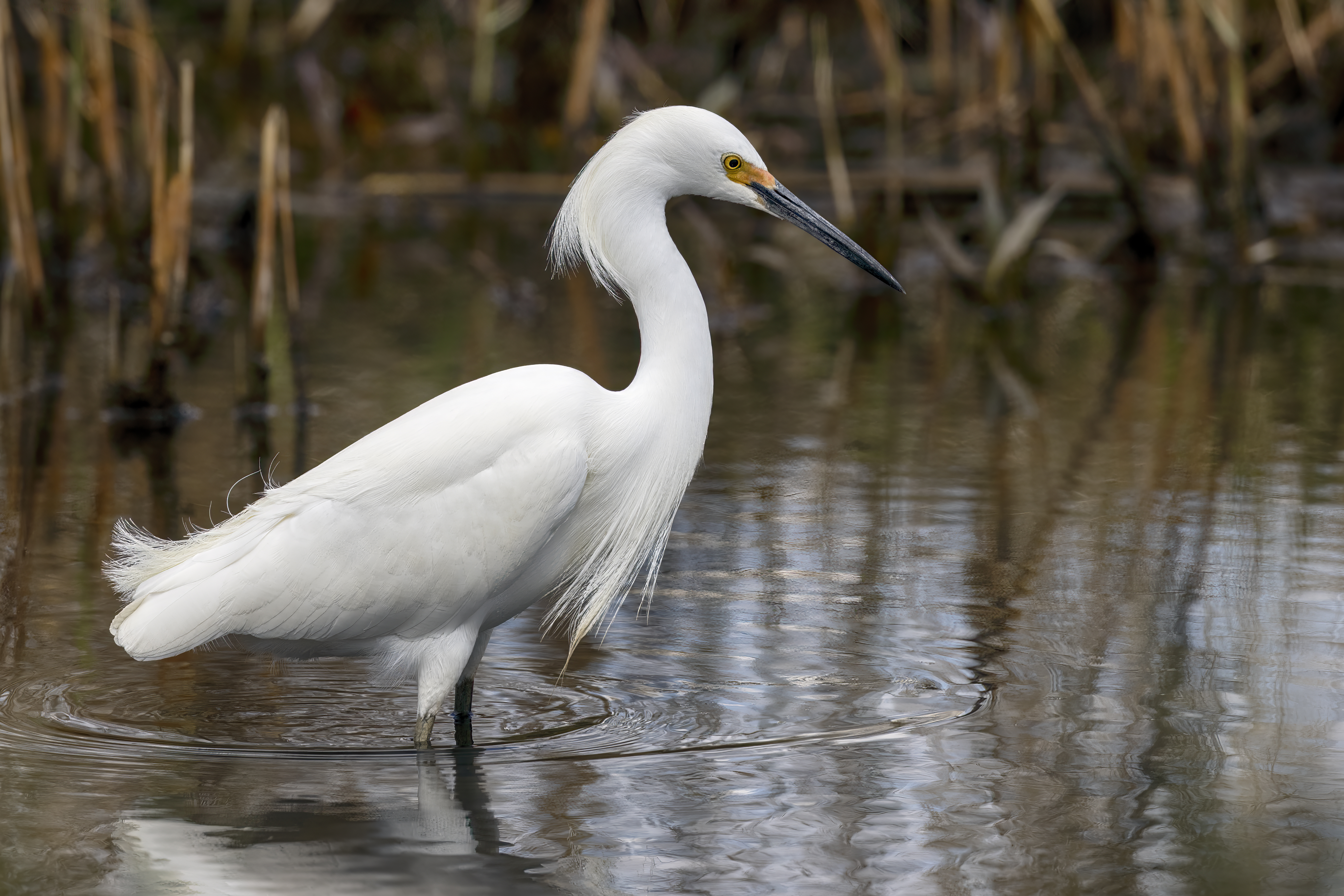
- A snowy egret, in breeding plumage, at Edwin B. Forsythe National Wildlife Refuge

Conservation status
- Least Concern (IUCN 3.1)

Scientific classification
- Kingdom: Animalia
- Phylum: Chordata
- Class: Aves
- Order: Pelecaniformes
- Family: Ardeidae
- Genus: Egretta
- Species: E. thula

Binomial name
- Egretta thula (Molina, 1782)
- Range of E. thula Breeding range Year-round range Wintering range

Synonyms
- Ardea thula; Leucophoyx thula

= Snowy egret =

Snowy egret Temporal range: Late Pleistocene-recent 0.126–0 Ma

Species of bird

The snowy egret (Egretta thula) is a small white heron. The genus name comes from Provençal French for the little egret, aigrette, which is a diminutive of aigron, 'heron'. The species name thula is the Mapudungun term for the black-necked swan, applied to this species in error by Chilean naturalist Juan Ignacio Molina in 1782.

The snowy egret is the American counterpart to the very similar Old World little egret, which has become established in the Bahamas. At one time, the plumes of the snowy egret were in great demand as decorations for women's hats. They were hunted for these plumes and this reduced the population of the species to dangerously low levels. Now protected in the United States by law, under the Migratory Bird Treaty Act, this bird's population has rebounded.

== Distribution and habitat ==
The snowy egret is native to North, Central and South America. It is present all year round in South America, ranging as far south as Chile and Argentina. It also occurs throughout the year in the West Indies, Florida and coastal regions of North and Central America. Elsewhere, in the southern part of the United States, it is migratory, breeding in California, Nevada, Utah, Colorado, Arizona, New Mexico, Texas, Louisiana and Mississippi. It is found in wetlands of many types; marshes, riverbanks, lakesides, pools, salt marshes and estuaries. It is not found at high altitudes nor generally on the coast.

The snowy egret has occurred as a vagrant in Europe, in Iceland, Scotland and the Azores. It has also been recorded in South Africa.

== Description ==
Adult snowy egrets are entirely white apart from the yellow lores between the long black bill and the eye, black legs, and bright yellow feet. The nape and neck bear long, shaggy plumes known as aigrettes. Immature snowy egrets have duller, greenish legs.

Measurements:

- Length: 22.1–26.0 in (56–66 cm)
- Weight: 13.1 oz (370 g)
- Wingspan: 39.4 inches (100 cm)

== Fossil record ==
Fossils of the snowy egret have been reported from the Late Pleistocene deposits of the Talara tar seeps of Peru, and in Bradenton in Manatee County and Haile XIB in Alachua County in Florida, United States.

== Breeding ==
Snowy egrets breed in mixed colonies, which may include great egrets, night herons, tricolored herons, little blue herons, cattle egrets, glossy ibises and roseate spoonbills. The male establishes a territory and starts building the nest in a tree, vines or thick undergrowth. He then attracts a mate with an elaborate courtship display which includes dipping up and down, bill raising, aerial displays, diving, tumbling and calling. The immediate vicinity of the nest is defended from other birds and the female finishes the construction of the nest with materials brought by the male. It is constructed from twigs, rushes, sedges, grasses, Spanish moss and similar materials and may be 15 in (38 cm) across. Up to six pale bluish-green eggs are laid which hatch after about 24 days. The young are altricial and covered with white down when first hatched. They leave the nest after about 22 days.

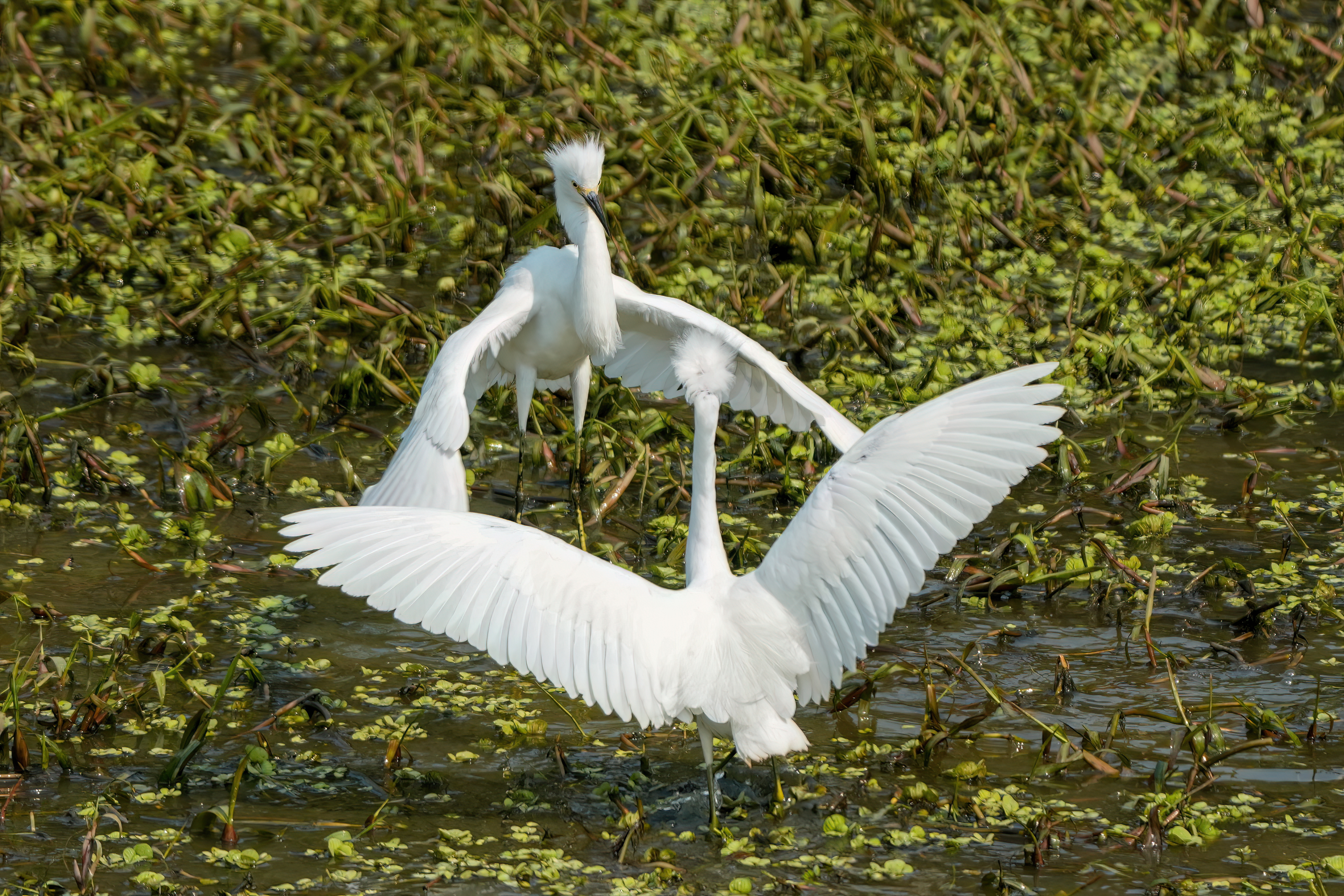
Males in breeding plumage fighting

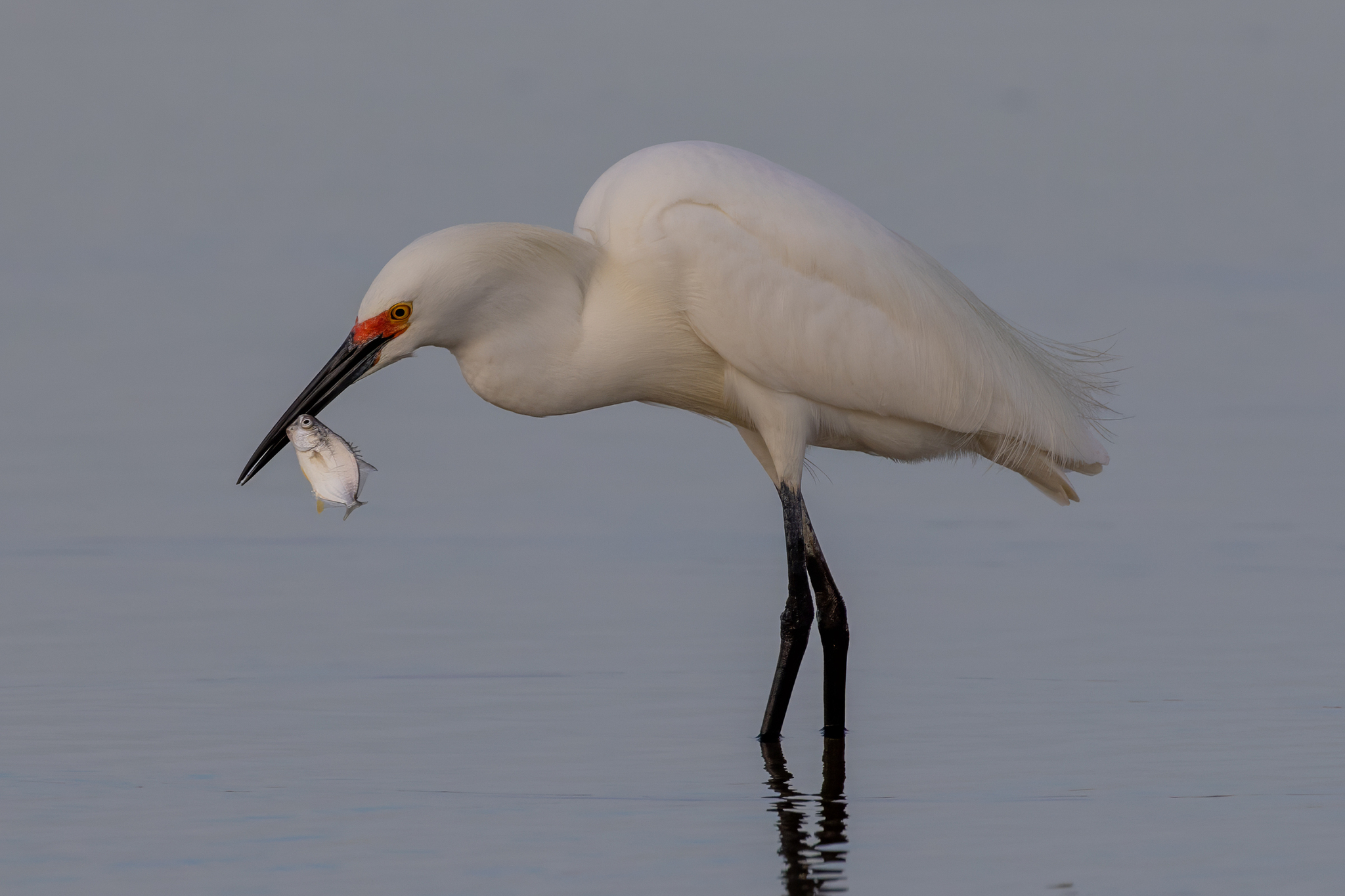
With a juvenile Florida pompano, showing the red lores characteristic of the breeding season.

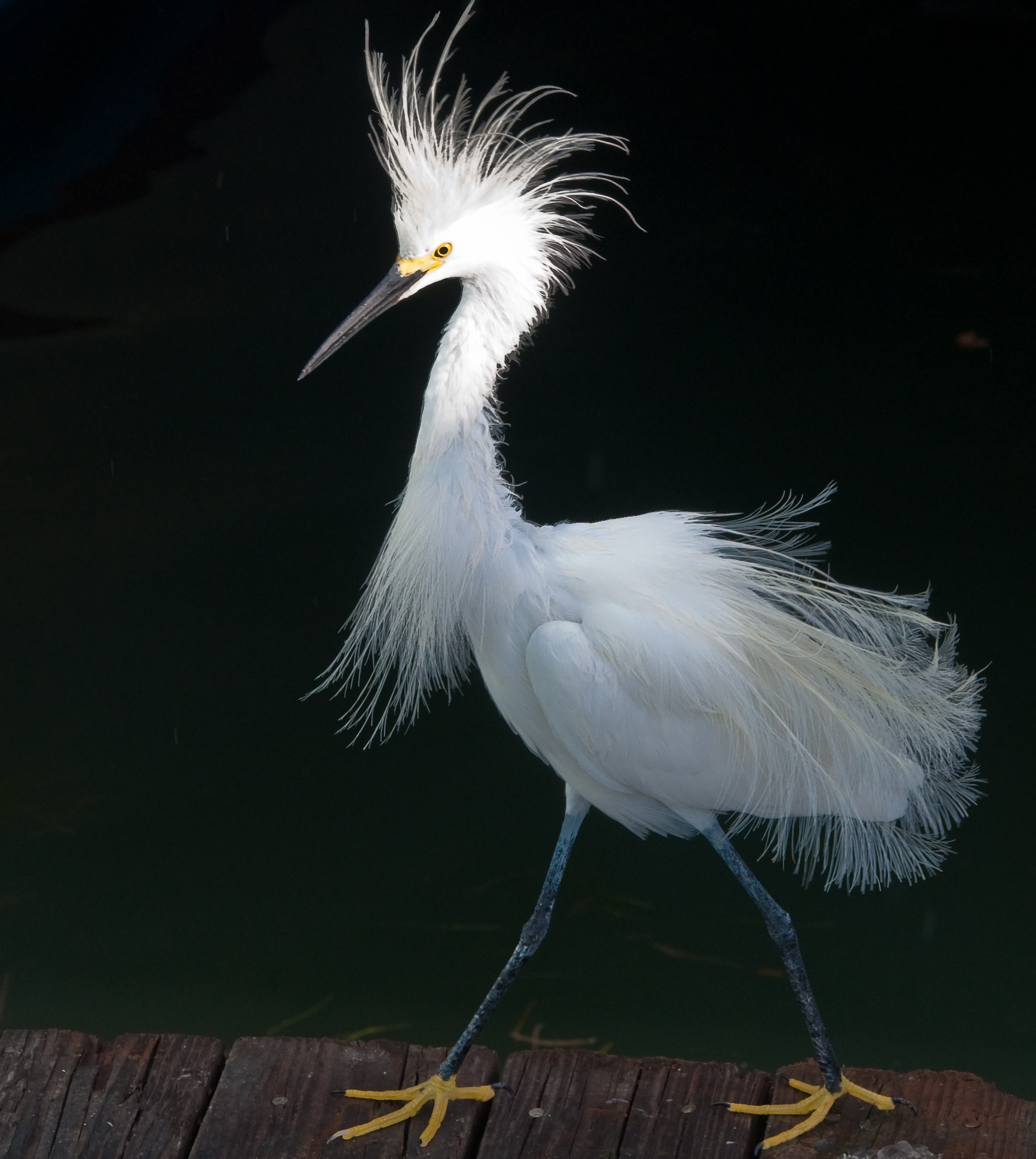
Breeding plumage

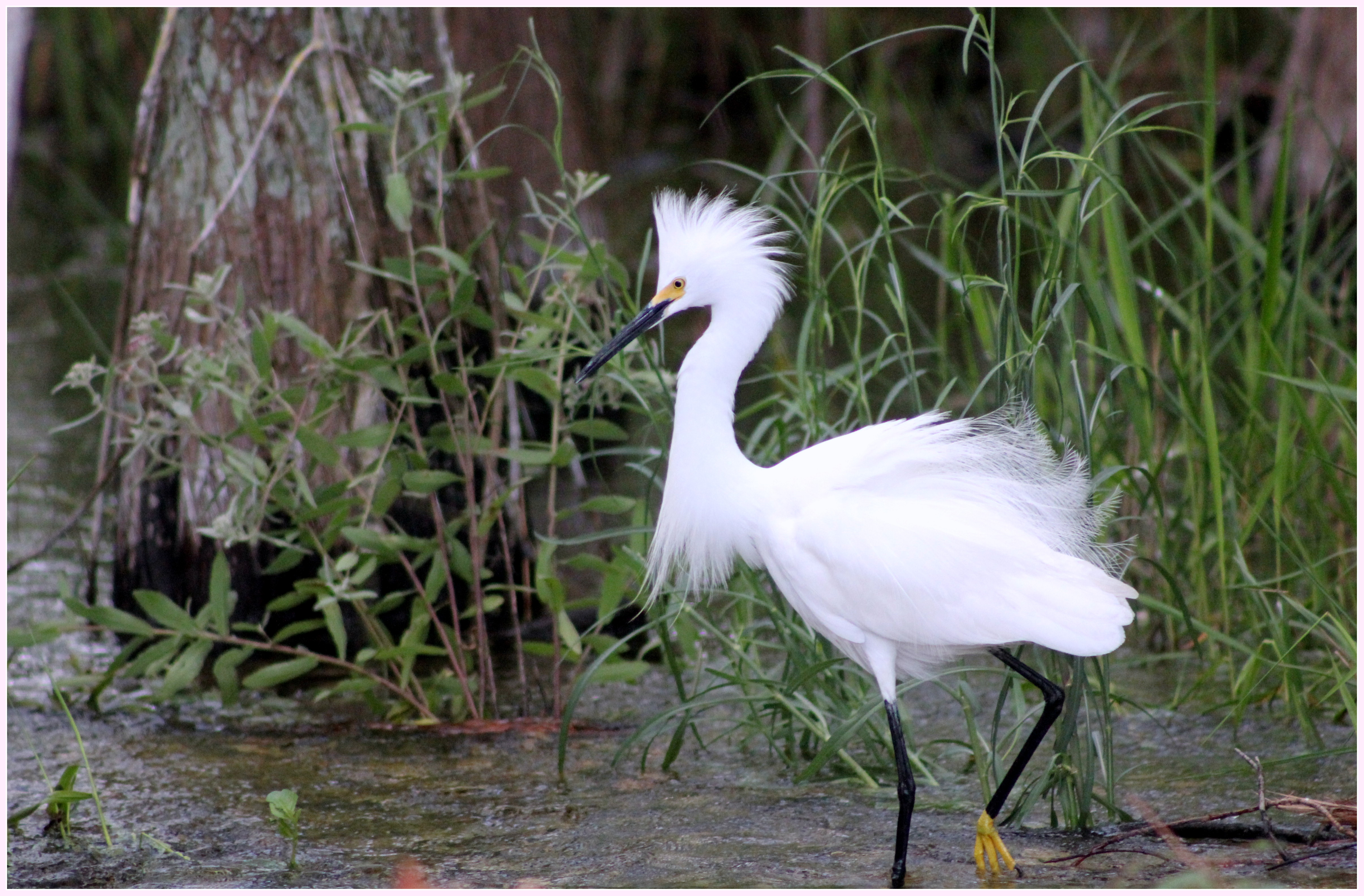
Breeding plumage

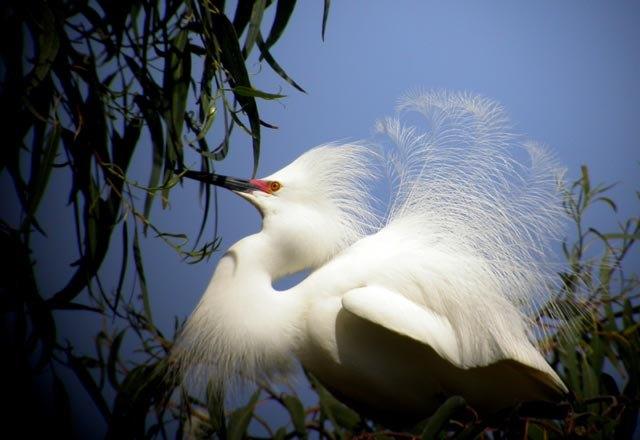
Breeding plumage

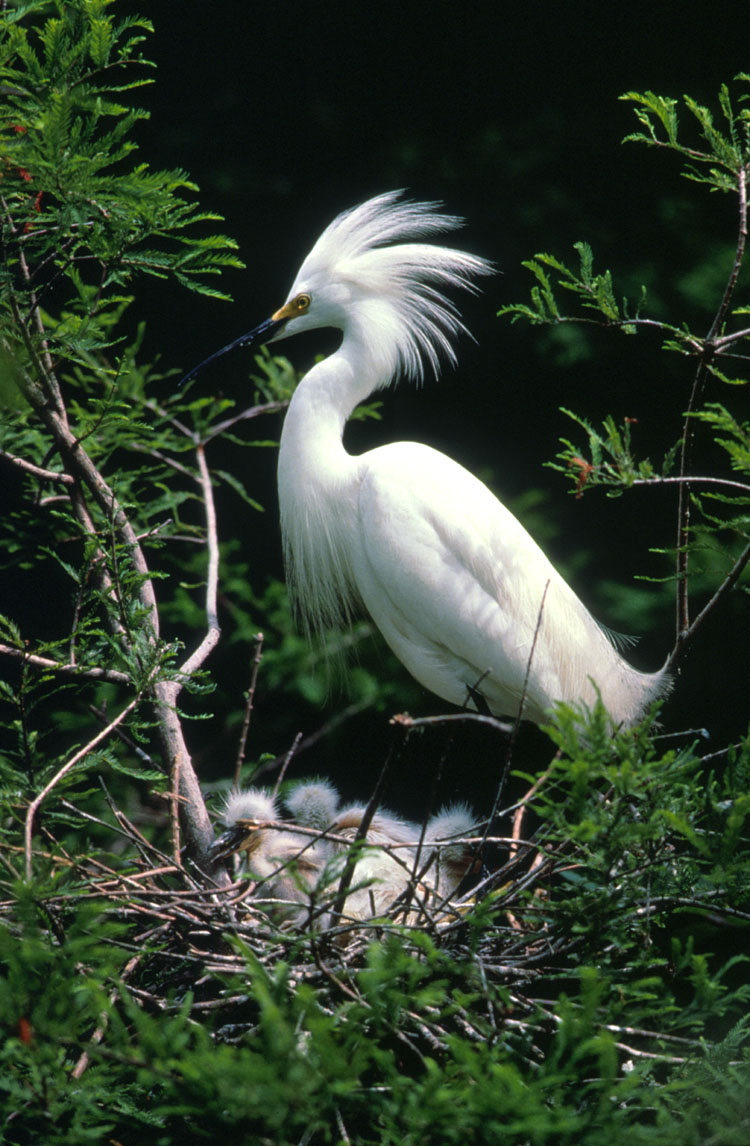
With chicks

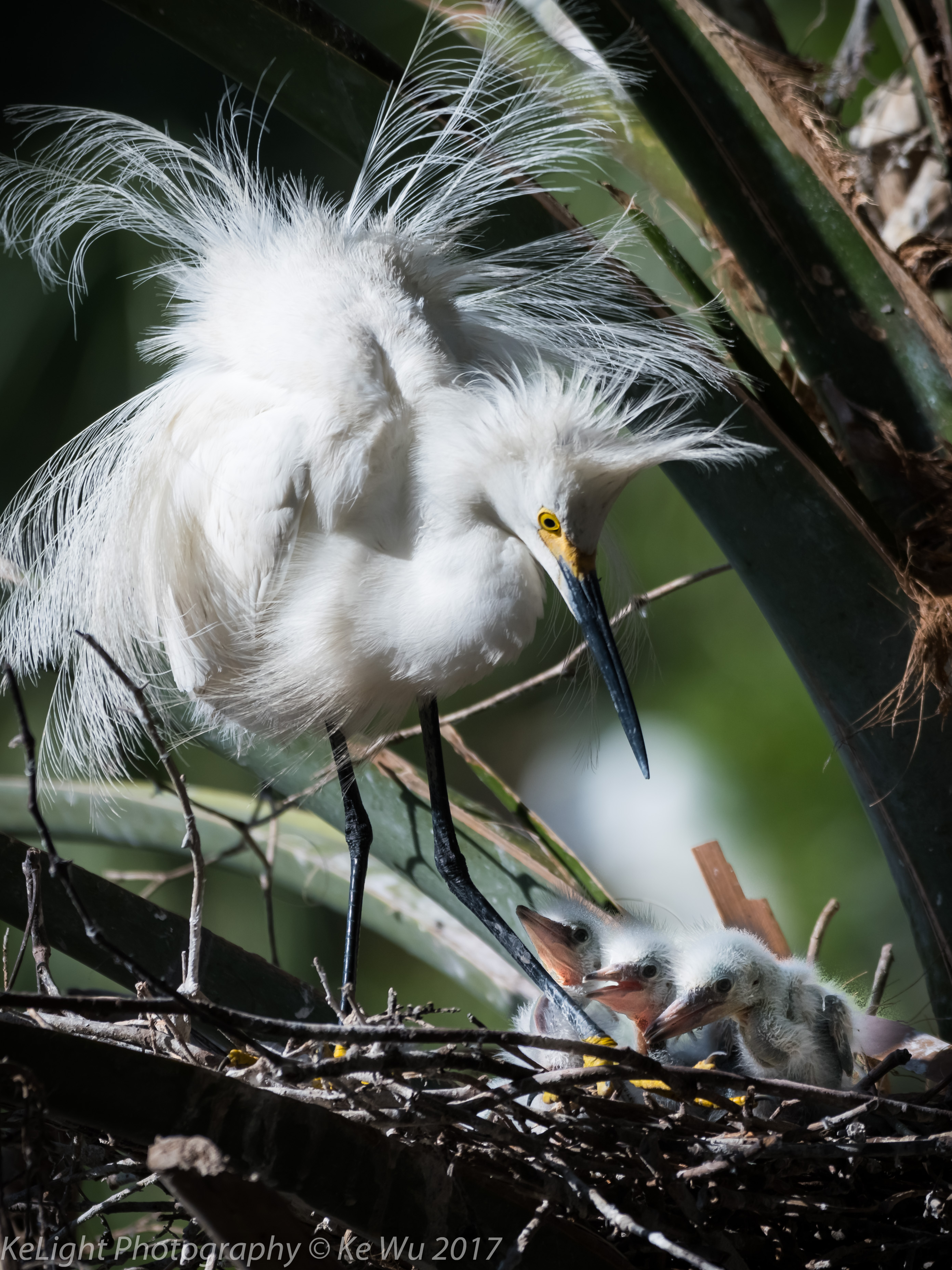
With chicks, in St. Augustine, FL

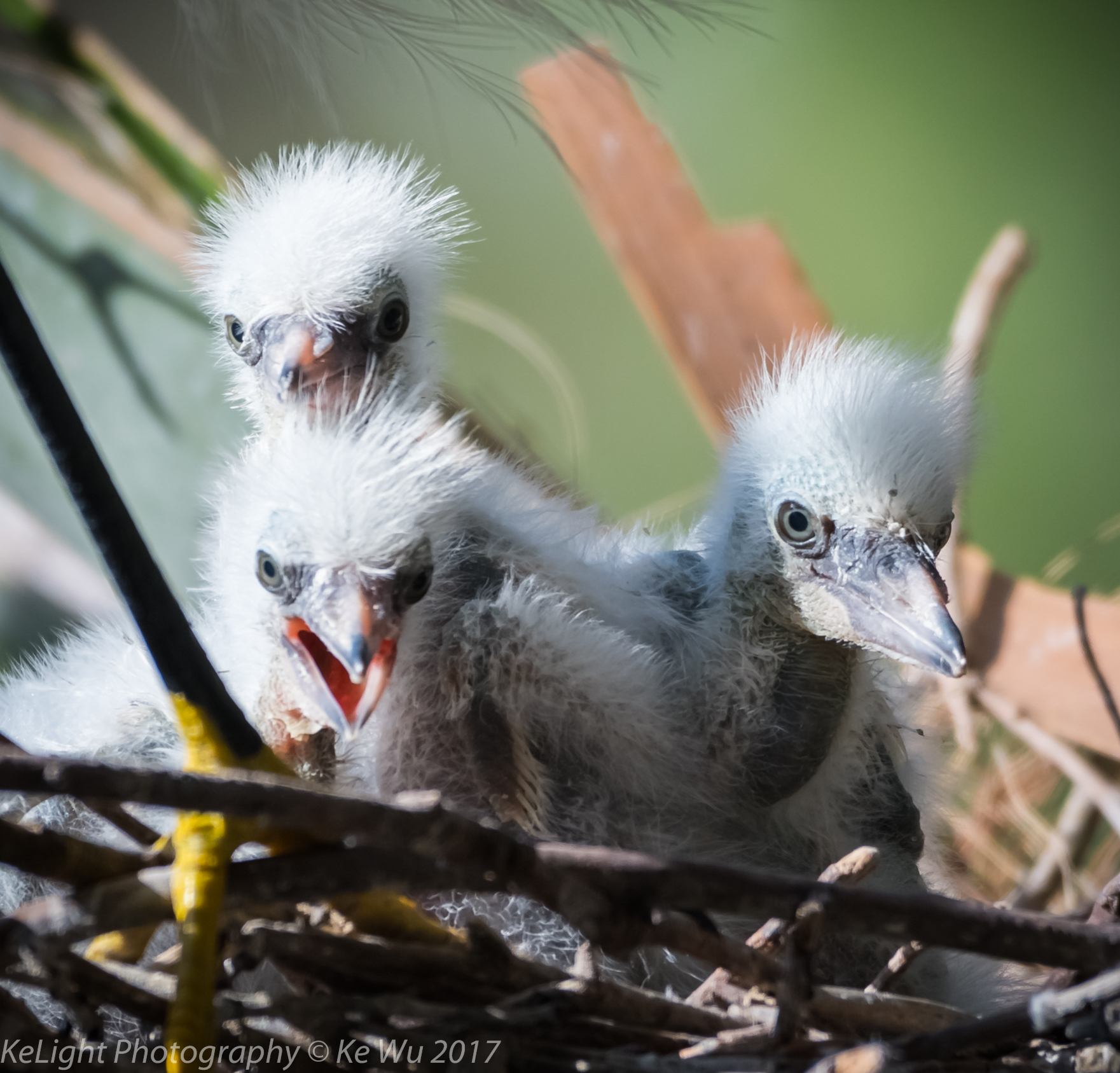
Chicks, in St. Augustine, FL

== Diet ==
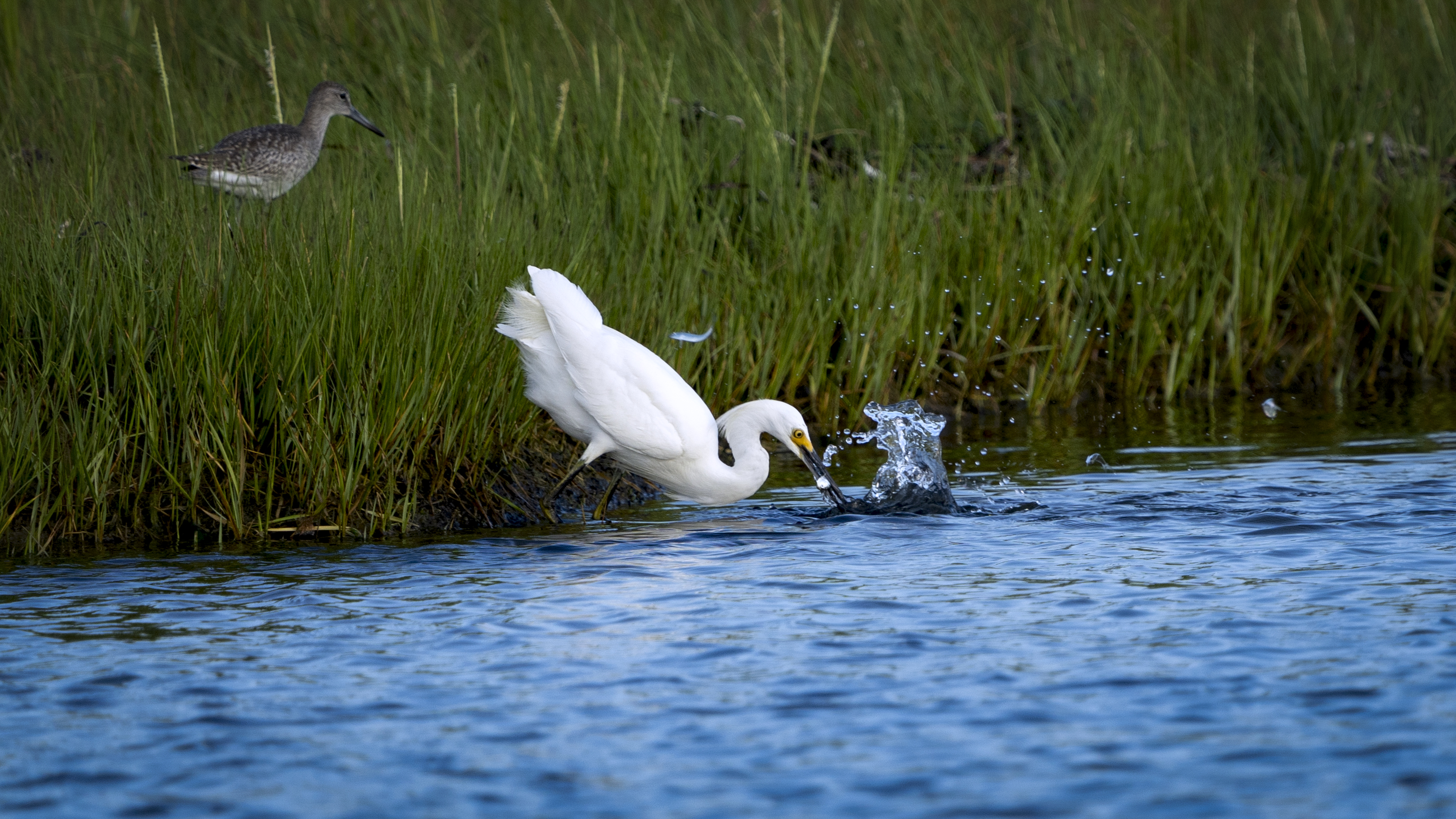
A snowy egret catches a fish

The birds eat fish, crustaceans (such as crabs, shrimp and crayfish), insects, small reptiles (such as lizards and snakes), snails, frogs, toads and worms (especially earthworms and other annelids).

They stalk prey in shallow water, often running or shuffling their feet, flushing prey into view by swaying their heads, flicking their wings or vibrating their bills. They may also hover, or "dip-fish" by flying with their feet just above the water surface. Snowy egrets may also stand still and wait to ambush prey, or hunt for insects stirred up by domestic animals in open fields. They sometimes forage in mixed species groups.

== Status ==
In the early twentieth century, the snowy egret was hunted extensively for their long breeding plumes that fashionable ladies wore on their hats. This trade was ended in 1910 in North America but continued for some time in Central and South America. Since then populations have recovered. The bird has a very wide range and the total population is large. No particular threats have been recognised and the population trend seems to be upwards, so the International Union for Conservation of Nature has assessed its conservation status as being of "least concern".

== Gallery ==
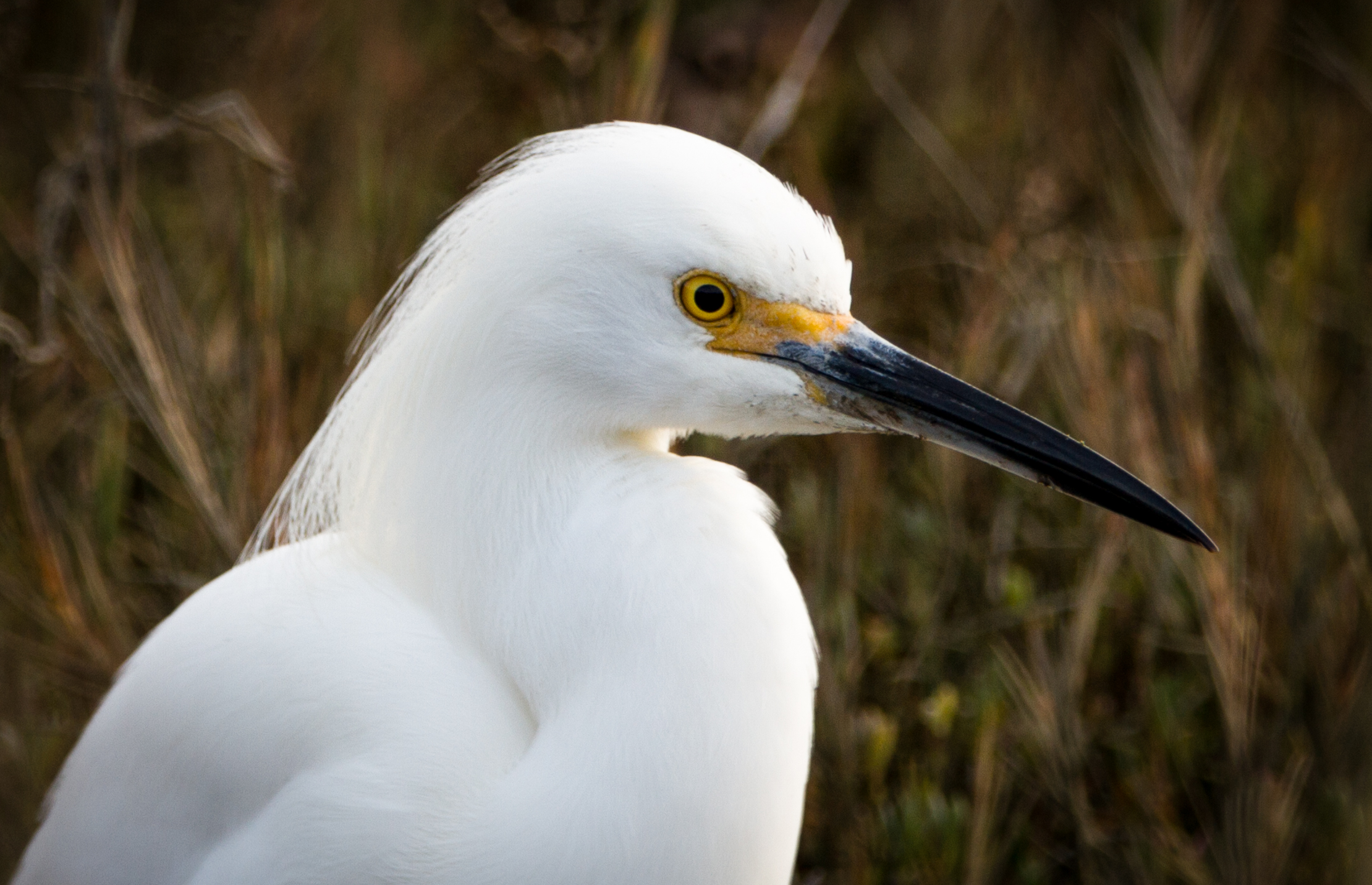
Head shot

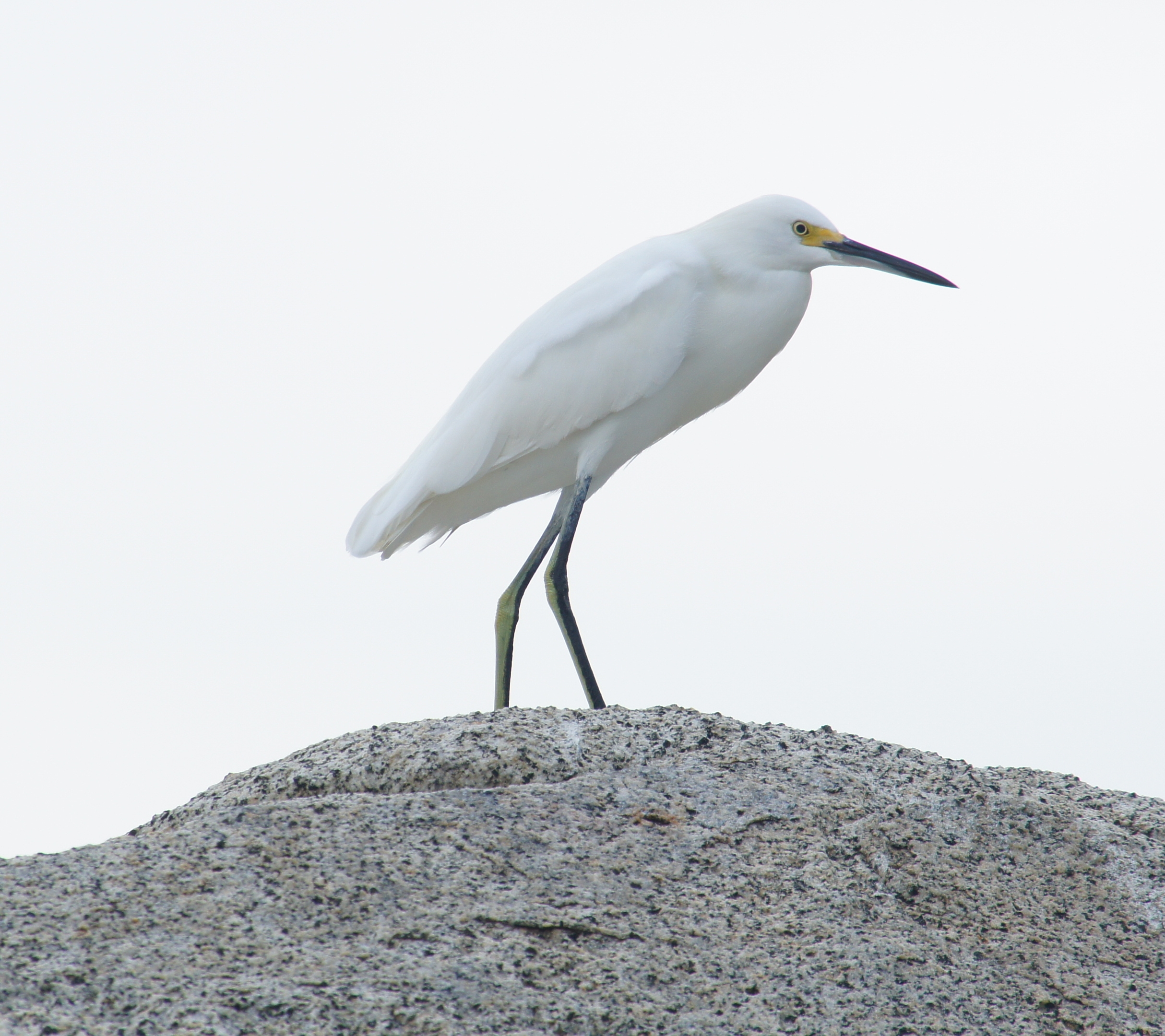
Tayrona national park, Colombia

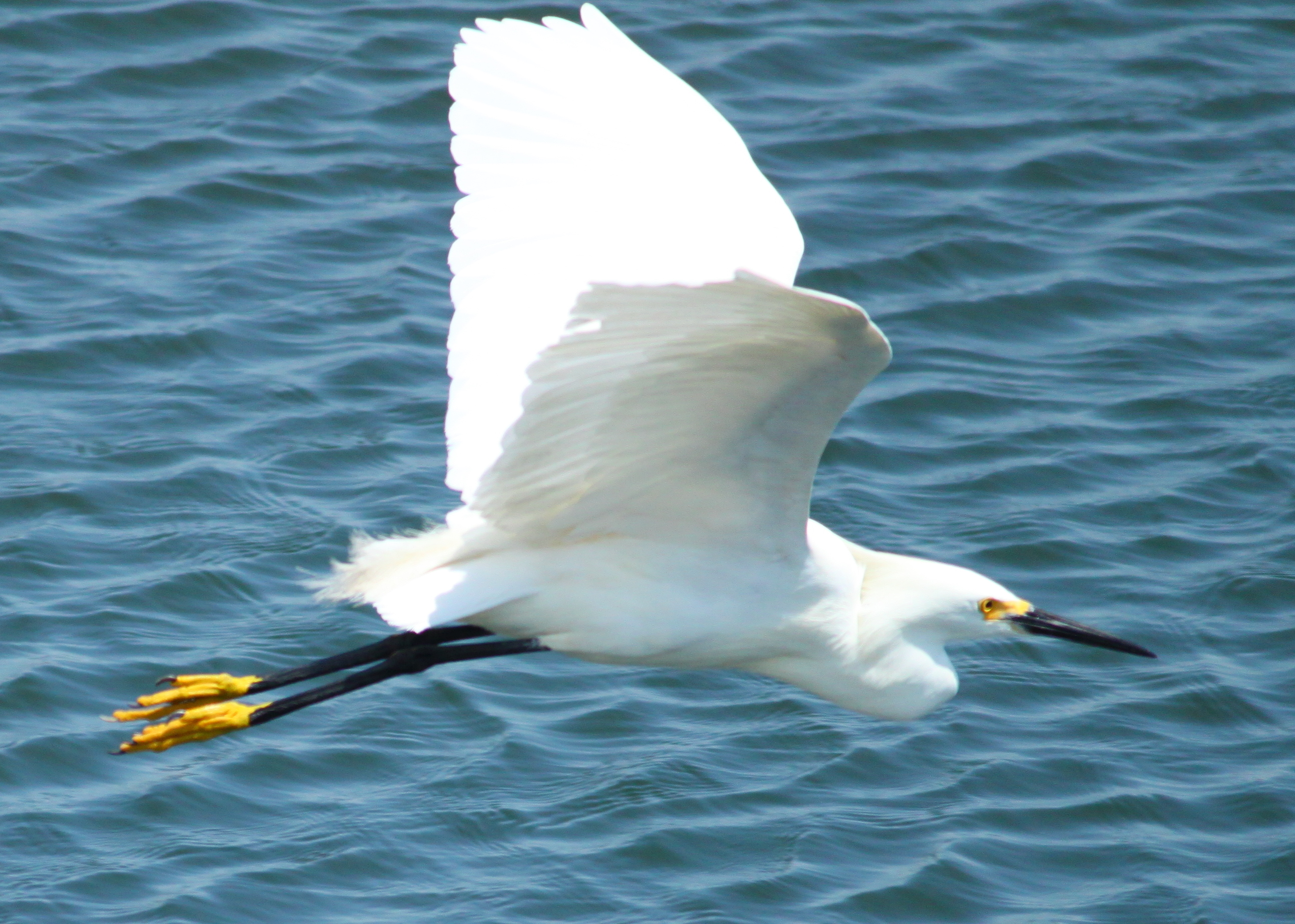
In flight

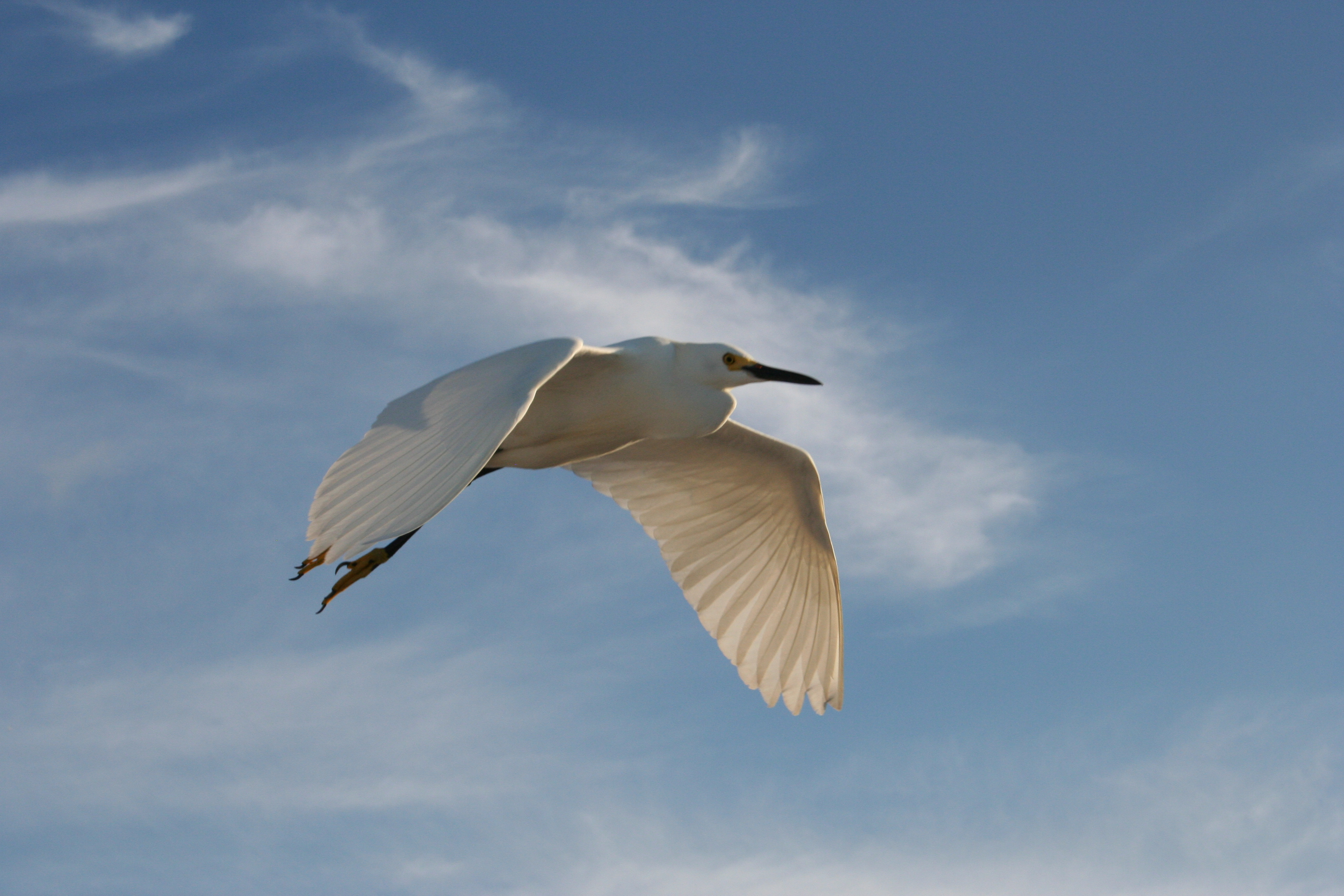
In flight

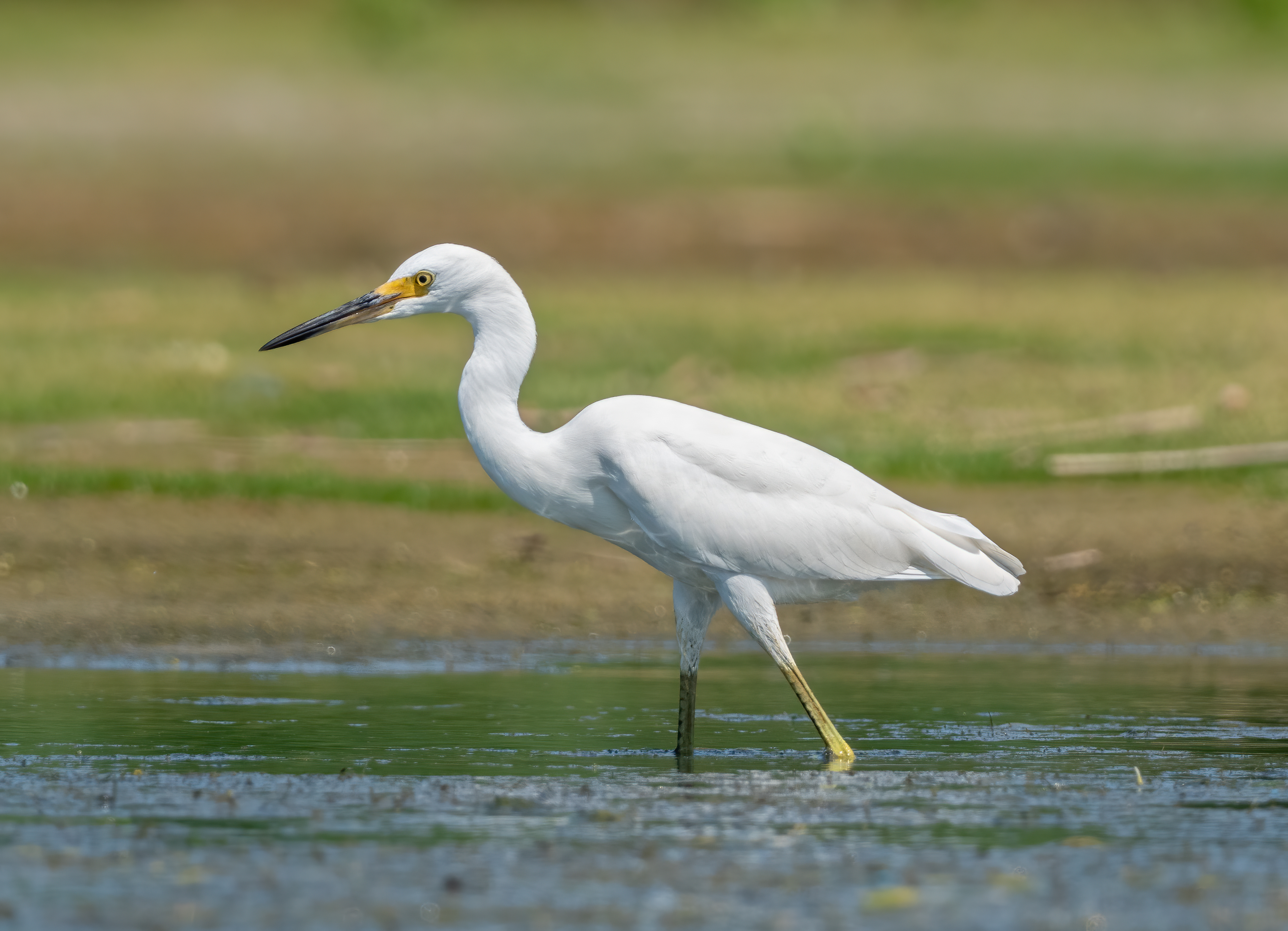
Snowy egret hunting in Queens, New York

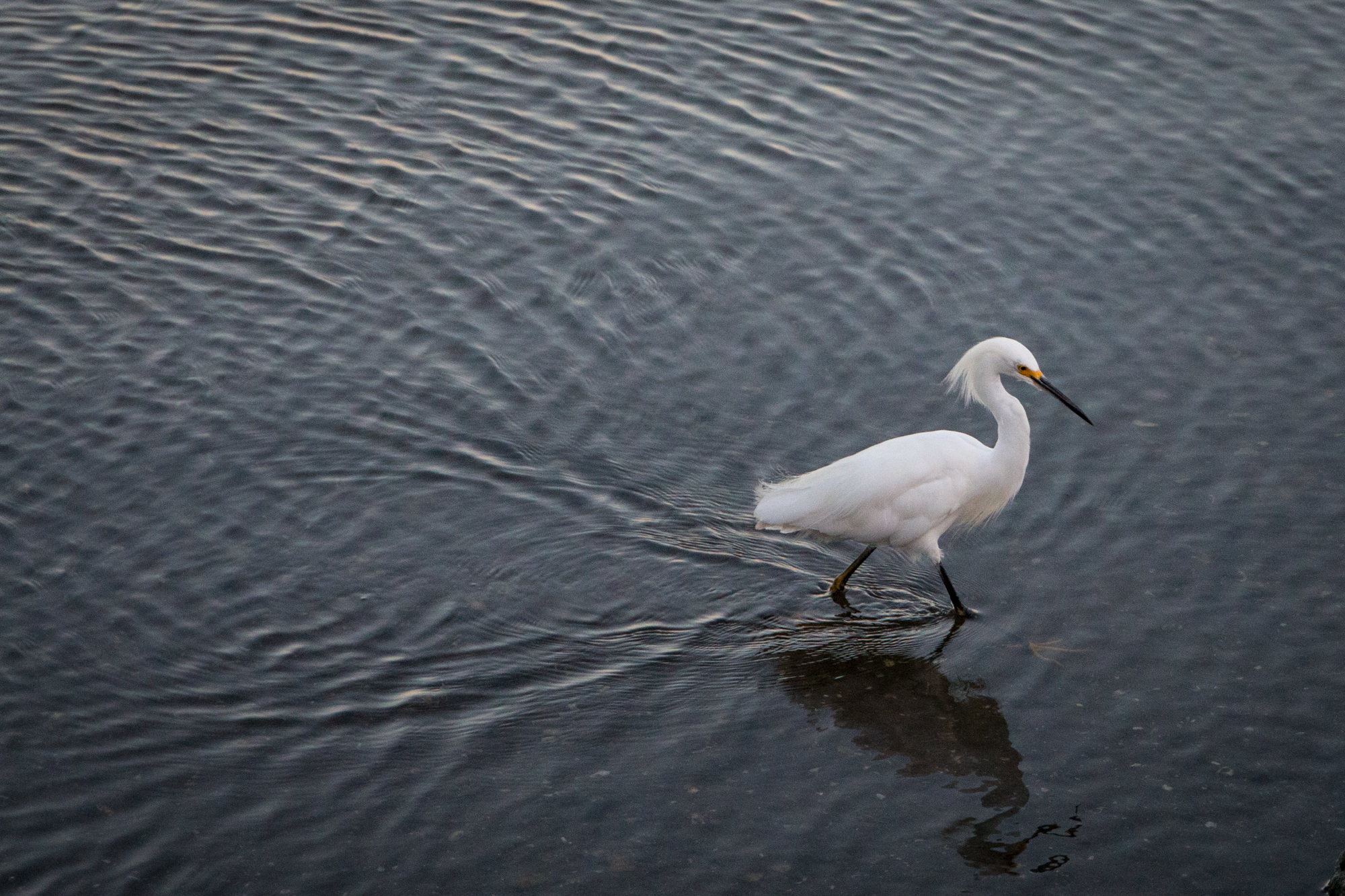
Snowy Egret walking along water's edge while looking for food

== Predation ==
In Florida, snowy egrets may be eaten by some growth stage of invasive snakes like Burmese pythons, reticulated pythons, Central African rock pythons, Southern African rock pythons, boa constrictors, yellow anacondas, Bolivian anacondas, dark-spotted anacondas, and green anacondas.
