= Noyes Museum =

Art museum in New Jersey, US

The Noyes Museum of Art of Stockton University
- Established: 1973; 53 years ago (Noyes Foundation); 1983; 43 years ago (museum opening to public)
- Location: Oceanville, New Jersey (1983-2016); Atlantic City, New Jersey (2013-present); Hammonton, New Jersey (2008-present)
- Coordinates: 39°27′57″N 74°27′21″W
- Type: Art museum
- Collection size: Approximately 3,500 works of art
- Director: Michael Cagno
- Website: www.noyesmuseum.org

The Noyes Museum of Art of Stockton University is an art museum and the only fine arts museum in southern New Jersey. Founded through the philanthropic efforts of Fred W. Noyes Jr. and Ethel (Lingelbach) Noyes, the museum opened in 1983 at a purpose-built facility on Lily Lake in the Oceanville section of Galloway Township, New Jersey. In 2016, operations were moved to satellite locations across Atlantic County when the Oceanville building closed due to mounting infrastructure costs.

The museum became a division of Stockton University in 2016 after a partnership that began in 2010. It now operates primarily through the Noyes Arts Garage in Atlantic City, which opened in 2013, and the Noyes Galleries at Kramer Hall in Hammonton, along with additional exhibition spaces at several other venues across the county.

The Noyes collection comprises approximately 3,500 works of art and sculpture spanning the 19th through 21st centuries, with emphases on fine and folk art, including a notable collection of over 300 duck decoys.

== History ==
=== Founding and construction ===
Noyes Museum sites in Atlantic County, New Jersey

The museum was created largely through the efforts of Fred W. Noyes Jr. and his wife Ethel (Lingelbach) Noyes. Fred Noyes was an academically trained artist and avid art and antique collector who helped create and promote the "Historic Towne of Smithville" tourist attraction, and was the owner of the Smithville Inn restaurant.

The Noyes family established their charitable foundation in 1973 and began design of the museum in 1974, using funds from the sale of Historic Smithville. The site chosen was the former location of the Little Indian Day Camp; Fred Noyes purchased the 733 acres (297 ha) property in April 1978 for $250,000. The museum was designed by Paul Cope of the firm Cope, Lippincott & Slifer and built along the downward slope toward Lily Lake. Noyes invested approximately $4 million into constructing and endowing the facility.

The museum opened in 1983 on Lily Lake Road in the Oceanville section of Galloway Township, directly adjacent to the Edwin B. Forsythe National Wildlife Refuge. Ethel Noyes died in 1979 during construction, and Fred Noyes died in 1987, but the foundation they established continued to operate the museum.

=== Oceanville years (1983-2016) ===
For over three decades, the museum served as a cultural center within Atlantic County, hosting exhibitions, concerts, classes, and community events. The building eventually developed significant infrastructure problems: its sloped construction made climate control across the multi-level galleries difficult, the electrical systems required upgrading, and the structure was not compliant with the Americans with Disabilities Act (ADA).

=== Stockton University partnership and takeover ===
In 2010, the museum signed a collaboration agreement with Stockton University under which the college would gain access to portions of the Noyes collection and expand programming, while Stockton committed $500,000 to renovate the Oceanville building and bring it into ADA compliance.

The university withdrew from the renovation in late 2015, and both parties concluded that further investment in the aging structure was not justified. The Oceanville building closed in January 2016, and the museum formally became a part of Stockton University, with operations shifting to the Arts Garage in Atlantic City, Kramer Hall in Hammonton, and the Seaview gallery in Galloway.

In December 2017, the Noyes Foundation donated its remaining assets to the university, including the Oceanville property, the permanent collection, and other holdings valued at $2.2 million, and then dissolved. The Oceanville property was subsequently sold to LifePoint Church in 2021.

== Locations ==
=== Noyes Arts Garage, Atlantic City ===
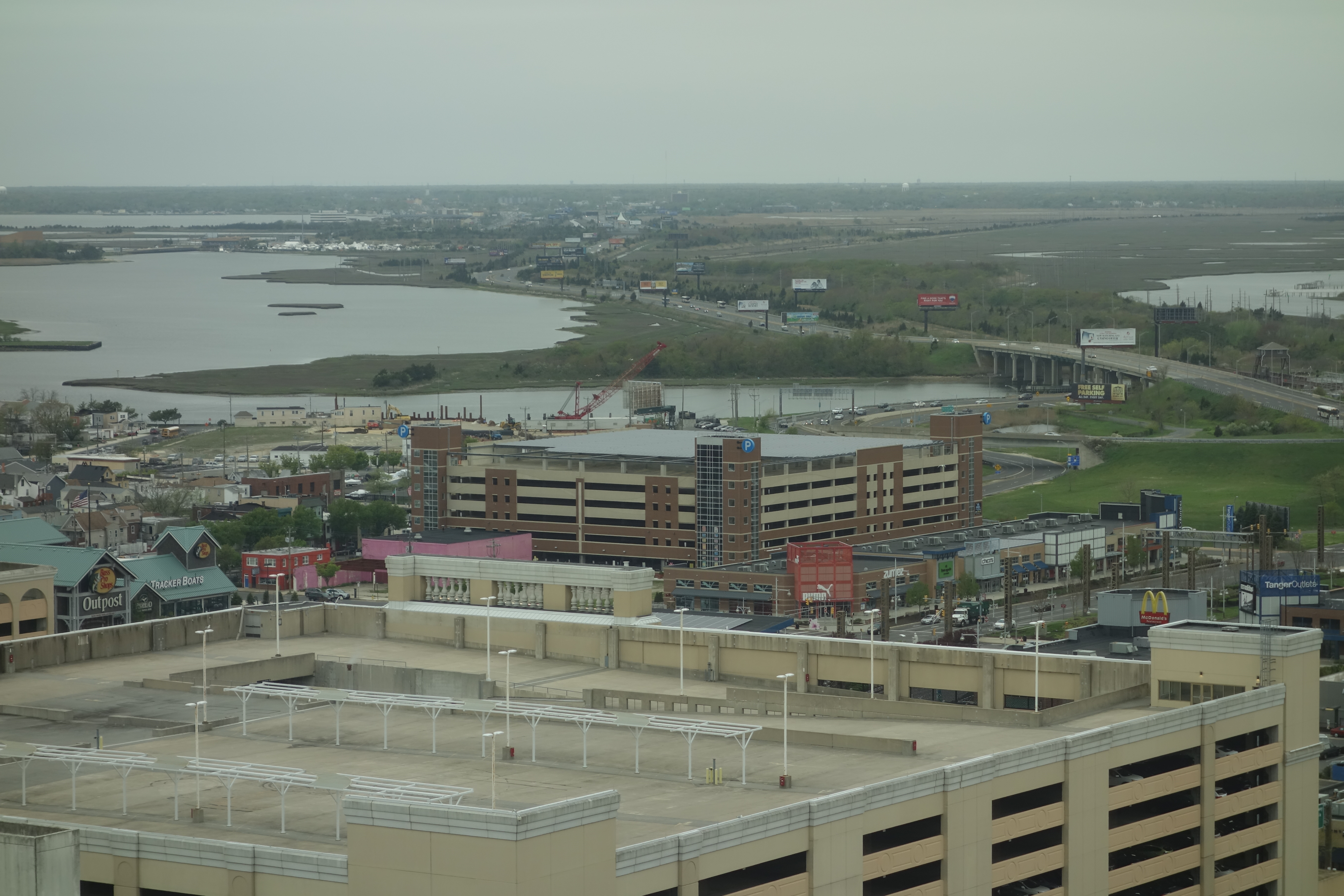
Wave Garage / Noyes Arts Garage, Stockton University, Atlantic City, New Jersey.

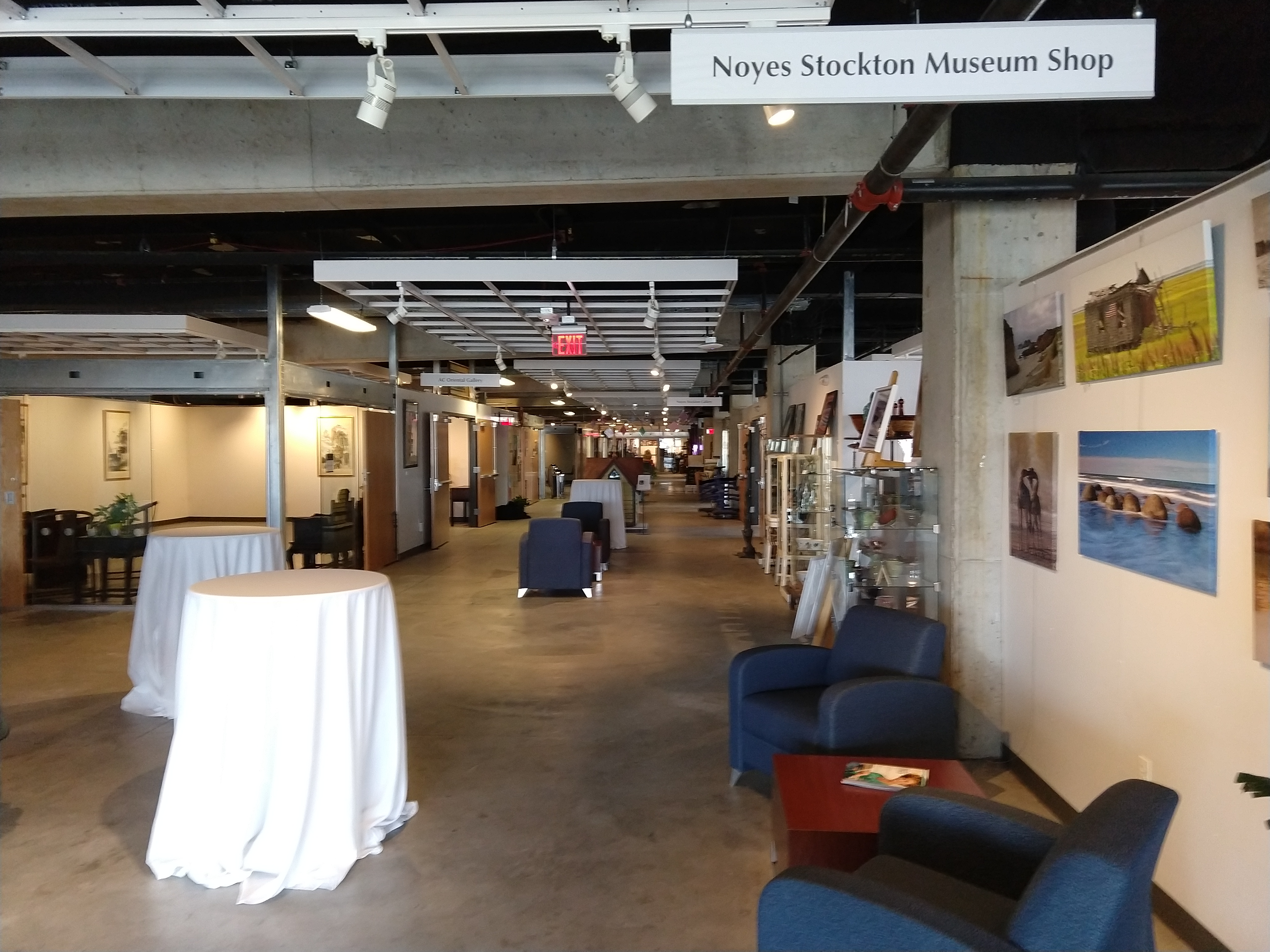
Noyes Arts Garage interior

The Noyes Arts Garage is the museum's largest and most prominent location. It opened in November 2013 at 2200 Fairmount Avenue in downtown Atlantic City, within the WAVE parking garage near the Boardwalk and Jim Whelan Boardwalk Hall. The building was redeveloped by Atlantic City's Casino Reinvestment Development Authority (CRDA), which leases the space to the museum at no cost.

The facility houses two museums, eight artist studios, galleries, shops, a cafe, and a workshop space. The Noyes galleries occupy approximately 1,200 square feet (110 m^{2}) of exhibition space with rotating shows, and the individual artist studios allow visitors to watch artists at work and purchase original artwork directly. The Arts Garage is open Wednesday through Sunday, 11 a.m. to 6 p.m.

Selected exhibitions at the Noyes Arts Garage
Exhibition	Dates	Description
Mother Nature vs. Human Nature: The Inequity of Climate Resilience (NJ Arts Annual)	January-May 2023	Largest exhibition in museum history; 105 works by 103 New Jersey artists displayed across both the Arts Garage and Kramer Hall
Ducktown: An Atlantic City Immigration Story (Janice Merendino)	January-March 2024	Mixed-media works documenting the evolution of Atlantic City's Ducktown neighborhood through past and present immigrant stories
Still Here: The Nanticoke Lenni-Lenape and Powhatan-Renape Nations of Southern New Jersey	October 2024 - January 2025	Historical documents, traditional artifacts, and contemporary art celebrating two southern New Jersey tribal communities
Drag is Not a Crime	June-September 2024	Photography, fashion, and visual art celebrating drag culture and self-expression for Pride Month
Academic Visions: Southern NJ University and College Art Professors Showcase	January-May 2025	Works by 35 professors from five southern New Jersey colleges and universities, including Stockton, Rowan, and Rutgers
Surf Skate AC	August-November 2025	Contemporary art by local artists and Stockton alumni capturing Atlantic City's surfing and skateboarding cultures
Immigration 1.0 Relief Prints on Fabric (Fay Stanford)	August-November 2025	Relief prints on fabric exploring the relationship between the Lenape and European settlers in the Mid-Atlantic region
Camp Boardwalk: Atlantic City during World War II	January-March 2026	Exhibit on Atlantic City's role in World War II as a military training center, curated by Dr. Patricia Chappine
Calina Hiriza & Sandra Kosinski	December 2025 - March 2026	Abstract painting with resin and raku pottery

==== African American Heritage Museum of Southern New Jersey ====
The African American Heritage Museum of Southern New Jersey (AAHMSNJ) is a permanent anchor tenant within the Arts Garage, occupying dedicated gallery space since 2013. The museum was founded in 2002 by Ralph E. Hunter Sr., a retired retail professional and collector, originally in the Newtonville section of Buena Vista Township; that location remains open as well.

The AAHMSNJ collection includes over 33,000 pieces of memorabilia, paintings, ceramics, and advertising ephemera, all cataloged with assistance from Stockton University. Its permanent exhibit, "Stereotypes," presents historical marketing imagery depicting African Americans. The AAHMSNJ also operates a traveling museum that visits 50 to 100 schools annually across four states, reaching over 100,000 people per year. In 2025, the CRDA honored Hunter with its Spirit of Hospitality Award. The museum is open Wednesday through Sunday; admission is free.

Selected exhibitions at the AAHMSNJ (Atlantic City location)
Exhibition	Dates	Description
Stereotypes	Permanent	Historical advertising and branding memorabilia depicting African Americans; the museum's foundational exhibit
Stealing Home: How Jackie Robinson Changed America	May-August 2017	Exhibit exploring Jackie Robinson's career and impact, funded by the CRDA
Back from Mother Africa	February-June 2018	African paintings, prints, ceremonial masks, and carved objects from multiple donated collections
Black Cowboys & Buffalo Soldiers	February-April 2023	History of African Americans in the settlement of the American West
The Art of the Quilt: Fiber & Clay (Gloria Gammage Davis)	February-March 2024	Quilted art focusing on African American history and culture through textile artistry
Miss Black America	August-September 2024	Repurposed sculptures by Robert R. Jackson chronicling the founding of the Miss Black America pageant in Atlantic City in 1968

=== Noyes Galleries at Kramer Hall, Hammonton ===
The Noyes Galleries at Kramer Hall, located at 30 Front Street in downtown Hammonton, is the museum's second primary location. Situated within Hammonton's designated Arts District, the galleries present seasonal exhibitions showcasing work by regional, national, and international artists, as well as Stockton University faculty and students. The museum first established a presence in Hammonton in 2008 with a satellite space on South 2nd Street. Kramer Hall also houses stored portions of the permanent collection. The galleries are open Monday through Friday, 8:30 a.m. to 4:30 p.m.

Selected exhibitions at Kramer Hall
Exhibition	Dates	Description
Our House is on Fire (Brodsky, Garfield, Tudor, Wachs)	January-April 2024	Four-artist group exhibition on ecological concerns and climate resilience
Drag is Not a Crime	June-September 2024	Exhibition challenging societal norms and celebrating drag culture (in conjunction with Arts Garage)
Chanelle René and Quinton Greene	October 2024	Paintings by two local artists
Decolonial Pilgrimage	October 2025 - January 2026	International exhibition of American and Central European artists examining colonialism and sacred landscapes
Noyes Artist Member Showcase	July-September 2025	Annual juried exhibition of works by Noyes Museum artist members in various media
What Does It Mean To Be An American (Daniel Robert Horne)	January-May 2026	Portraits of explorers, thinkers, activists, and everyday people reflecting diverse American identity

=== Noyes Galleries at Seaview, Galloway ===
The Noyes Gallery at the Seaview resort (a Dolce Hotel) in Galloway Township is a 2,500 square feet (230 m^{2}) satellite gallery highlighting selections from the permanent collection and work by regional artists. It is free and open daily.

Selected exhibitions at the Seaview Gallery
Exhibition	Dates	Description
Ocean City Fine Arts League Spotlight	March-July 2025	Showcase of works by members of the Ocean City Fine Arts League
Pine Shores Art Association	July-September 2025	Exhibition of works by Pine Shores Art Association members
Seaview Plein Air Invitational	October 2025 - February 2026	Juried exhibit of 43 artists who painted en plein air on the Seaview grounds, co-sponsored with the Absecon Cultural Arts Alliance

=== Additional exhibition sites ===
In addition to its three gallery locations, the museum maintains rotating exhibitions of works from the Noyes permanent collection at several other venues:

Additional Noyes Museum exhibition sites
Venue	Location	Exhibition type
Shore Medical Center	Somers Point	Ongoing selections from the Noyes permanent collection
Borough Hall	Long Beach Island	Ongoing selections from the Noyes permanent collection
AtlantiCare	Atlantic City	Rotating exhibitions
Stockton University campuses	Galloway, Manahawkin, and Atlantic City	Rotating exhibitions

== Collection ==
The Noyes permanent collection comprises approximately 3,500 works of art and sculpture spanning the 19th through 21st centuries, with particular emphasis on artists connected to southern New Jersey. A notable component is a set of over 300 duck decoys collected by Fred Noyes; after the Oceanville building closed, the decoys were relocated to Hammonton's Town Hall. The collection also includes paintings by Noyes himself and works by artists such as Floretta and Ira Mostovoy, who documented Atlantic City life.

== Programs and outreach ==
The museum hosts educational programs, workshops, and community events across its locations.

In 2024, the museum launched the "Access to Art" program in partnership with the Atlantic Center for Independent Living, hosting over 100 art workshops at 13 sites for individuals with disabilities and their caregivers. The program received $70,000 in funding through 2025.

== Community involvement ==
The museum plays an active role in civic and cultural life across Atlantic County. The Arts Garage serves as the cornerstone of Atlantic City's designated Arts District, and the Kramer Hall galleries contribute to Hammonton's Arts District.

=== Recurring events ===
The museum hosts a monthly Second Friday reception at the Arts Garage with live music and gallery openings, and participates in Hammonton's town-wide Third Thursday events. The Arts Garage also hosts the monthly "World Above" poetry open mic series, organized with the South Jersey Poets Collective and Stockton's Murphy Writing Center. Since 2023, the Arts Garage has served as a venue for the state-sponsored North to Shore Festival.

=== Public art and placemaking ===
In 2020, the museum collaborated with the Murphy Writing Center and the Ducktown Community Development Corporation to create the Ducktown Poetry Trail, a self-guided public art walk through Atlantic City's Ducktown neighborhood featuring poetry on social justice themes. In 2022, the museum partnered with the Atlantic City Arts Foundation and Create 48 to commission two public murals for the NAACP National Convention's return to the city, with Stockton students assisting in the installation. In December 2023, Stockton received a $1 million NJEDA A.R.T. grant for a public art and wayfinding project in collaboration with four Atlantic City community development corporations: Ducktown, Chelsea, Inlet, and Midtown.

=== Youth and education partnerships ===
The museum offers children's art classes including the "Creative Sparks" and "Mighty Artistic" series for ages six through twelve, and hosts annual student art competitions from regional high schools. The Atlantic County Utilities Authority partners with the Arts Garage for its annual Recycled Art Contest. In 2019, the museum presented "Driving While Black," an exhibition exploring African American freedom of movement, accompanied by poetry slams and guided tours.

=== Student and volunteer programs ===
The museum offers a formal internship program (ARTV 3924) for Stockton visual arts majors, with placements in curatorial work, collections management, marketing, event planning, and education. The museum also accepts volunteers year-round.

=== Accessibility ===
Admission to all Noyes galleries is free. The Arts Garage and Kramer Hall are wheelchair accessible. Large-print gallery guides are available at each location, with braille materials by advance request. American Sign Language interpretation and live captioning are available for public programs with advance notice.

== Funding ==
The museum receives funding from the New Jersey State Council on the Arts, the Mr. and Mrs. Fred Winslow Noyes Foundation, Stockton University, and the Geraldine R. Dodge Foundation. In 2023, the Dodge Foundation donated $100,000 to the Arts Garage and the affiliated Stories of Atlantic City program.

== Leadership ==
Fred W. Noyes Jr. oversaw the museum from its opening in 1983 until his death in 1987. The founding director and curator was Anne R. Fabbri (1983-1991), who received the 1991 John Cotton Dana Award from the New Jersey Association of Museums.

Michael Cagno has served as executive director since approximately 2007. A graduate of Rowan University (BFA) and Seton Hall University (MA, Museum Management), Cagno previously founded an arts center in Millville during that city's downtown revitalization. He is also an adjunct professor of arts management at Stockton and president of the Ducktown Community Development Corporation. Cagno led the museum through its transition to a division of Stockton University and oversaw the expansion into satellite locations.

At the time of the 2016 transfer, Christine McCullough served as president of the Museum Board and Michael Hyett as president of the Noyes Foundation Board. The agreement was signed with Stockton President Harvey Kesselman. The former museum board subsequently transitioned into an advisory committee.

Key leadership figures
Name	Role	Period	Notes
Fred W. Noyes Jr.	Founder	1983-1987	Oversaw museum operations until his death; his art and decoy collection form the core of the permanent holdings
Anne R. Fabbri	Founding Director and Curator	1983-1991	Won the 1991 John Cotton Dana Award from the NJ Association of Museums
Michael Cagno	Executive Director	c. 2007-present	Led the Stockton transition; also adjunct professor of arts management and president of Ducktown CDC
Christine McCullough	President, Museum Board	-2016	Last board president before the museum's absorption into Stockton University
Michael Hyett	President, Noyes Foundation Board	-2017	Oversaw the foundation's dissolution and final asset transfer to Stockton
Harvey Kesselman	President, Stockton University	2015-2023	Signed the 2016 merger agreement on behalf of the university

== See also ==
- The Orange Loop

== Gallery ==
Original Noyes Museum building in Galloway Township, NJ
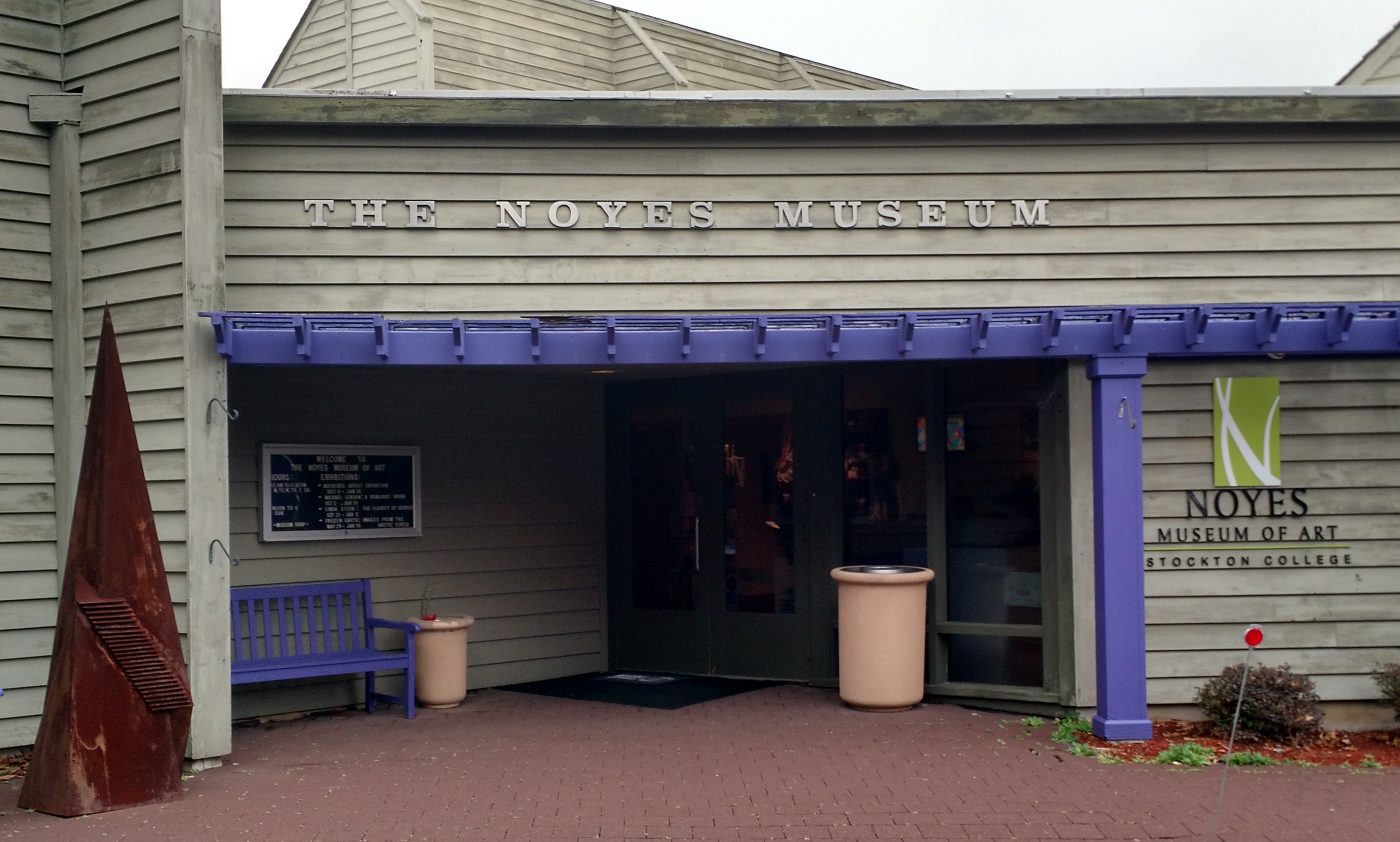
Front of the original Noyes Museum (Oceanville, closed 2016)

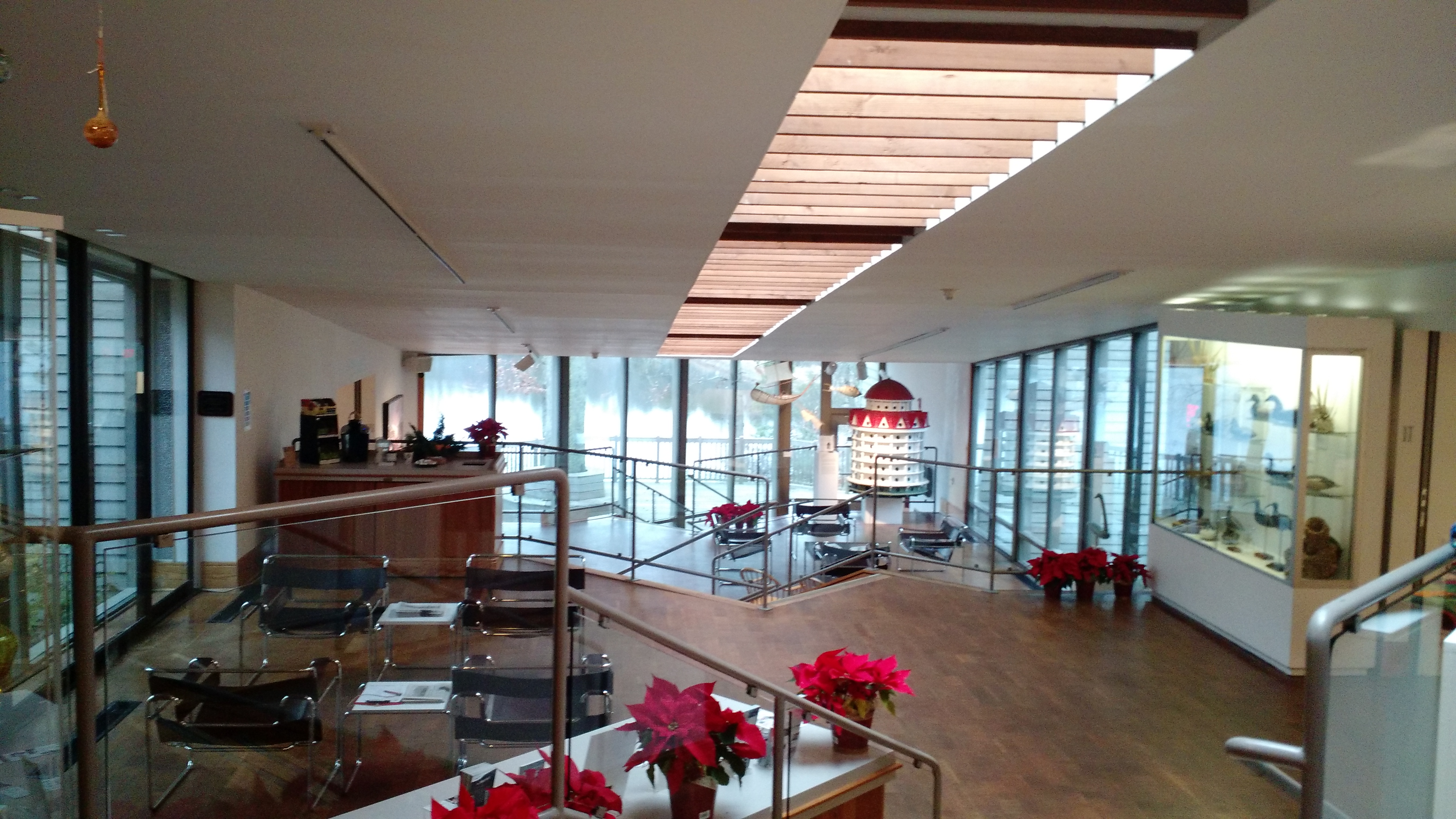
Interior

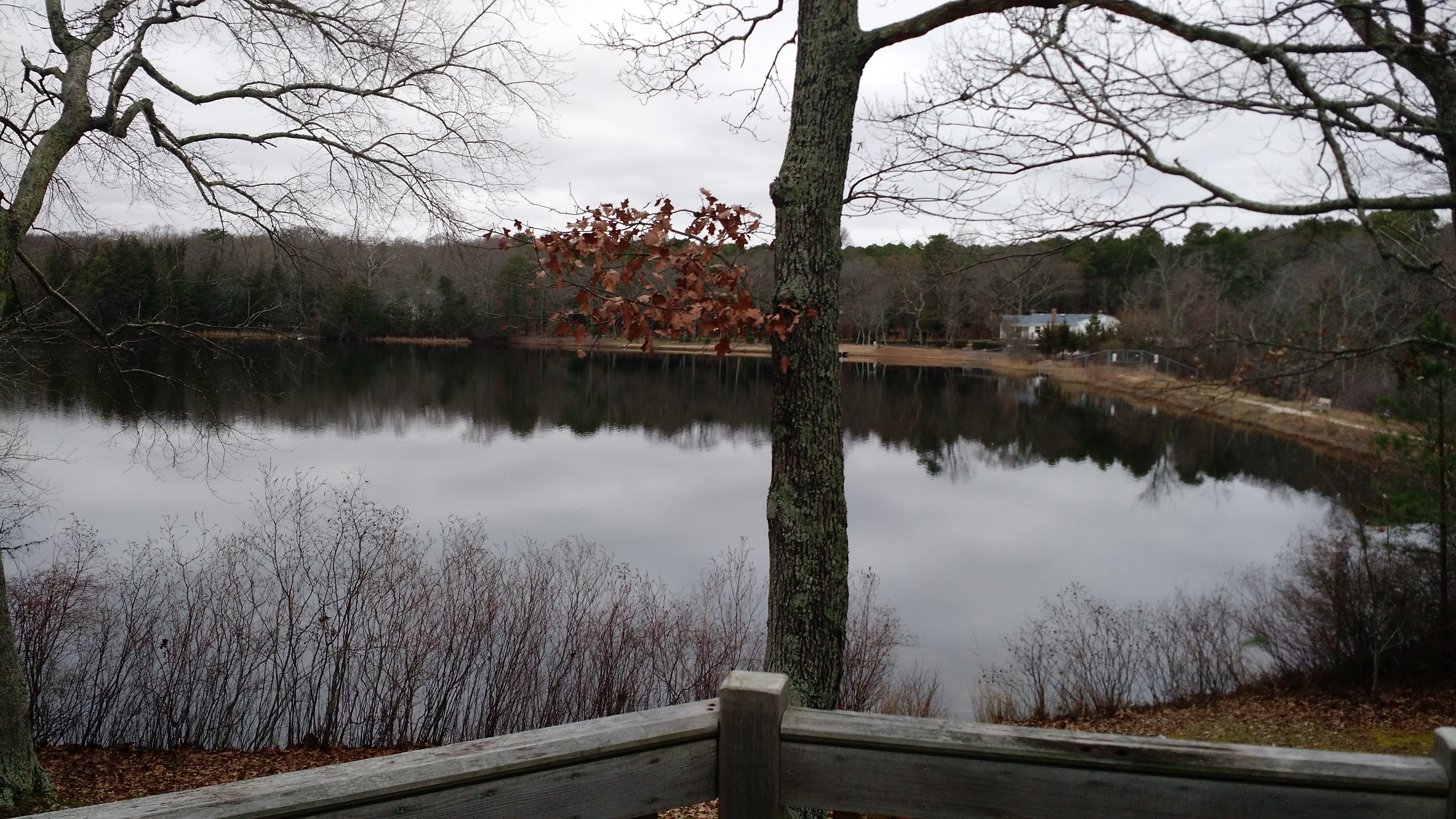
Rear exterior

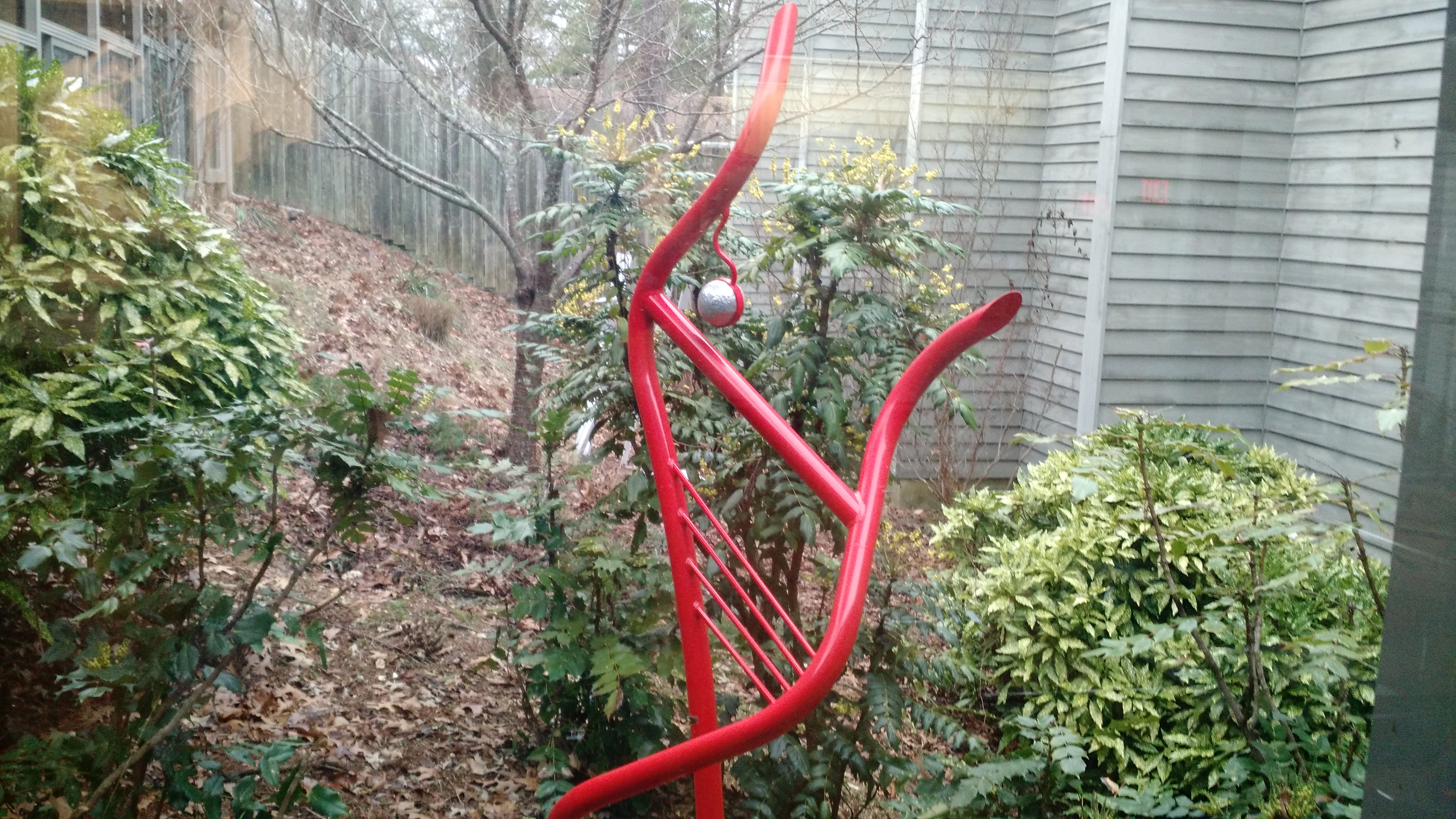
View from Lily Lake

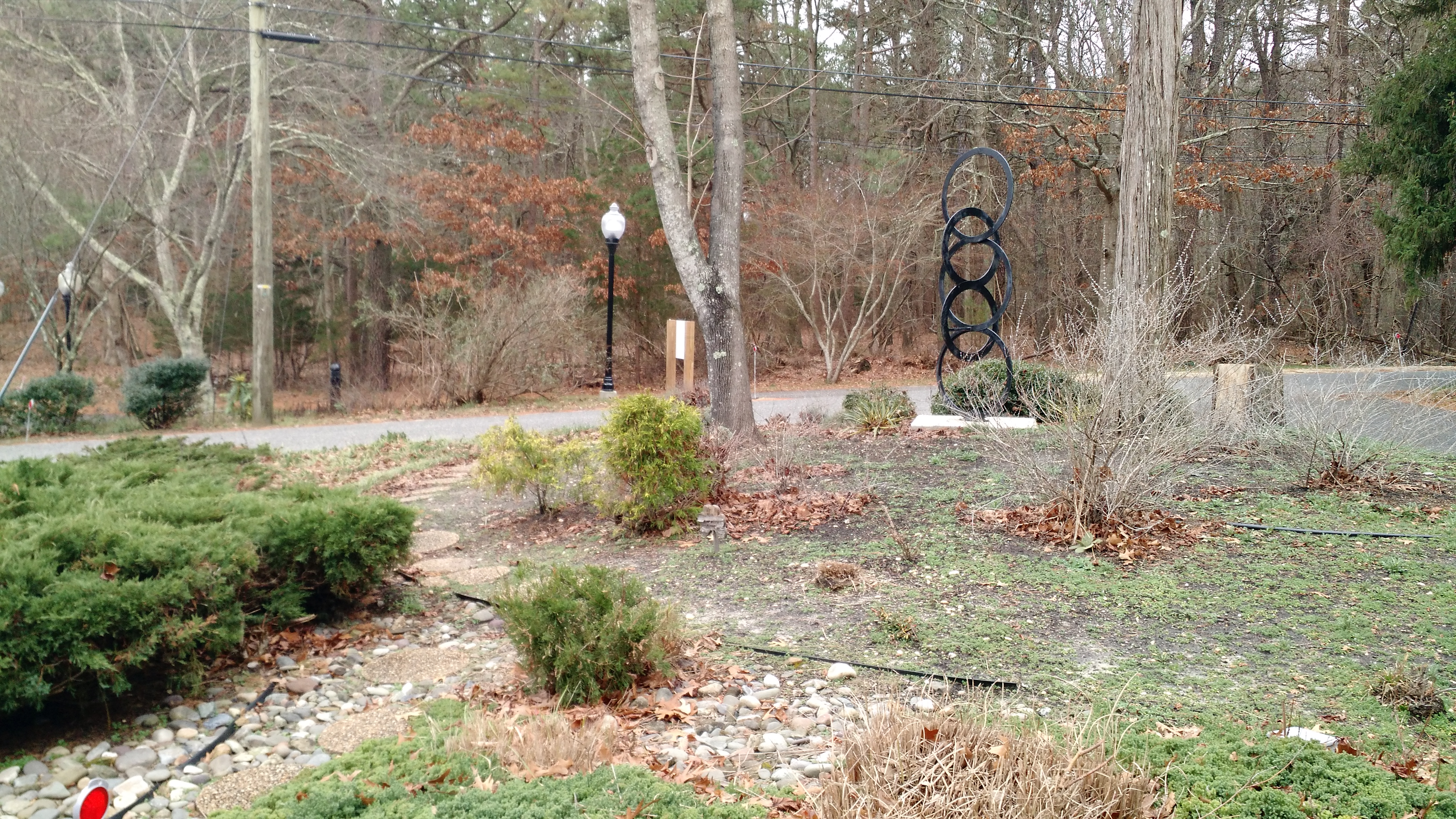
Front entrance
