= Oceanville, New Jersey =

Populated place in Atlantic County, New Jersey, US

- Census-designated place
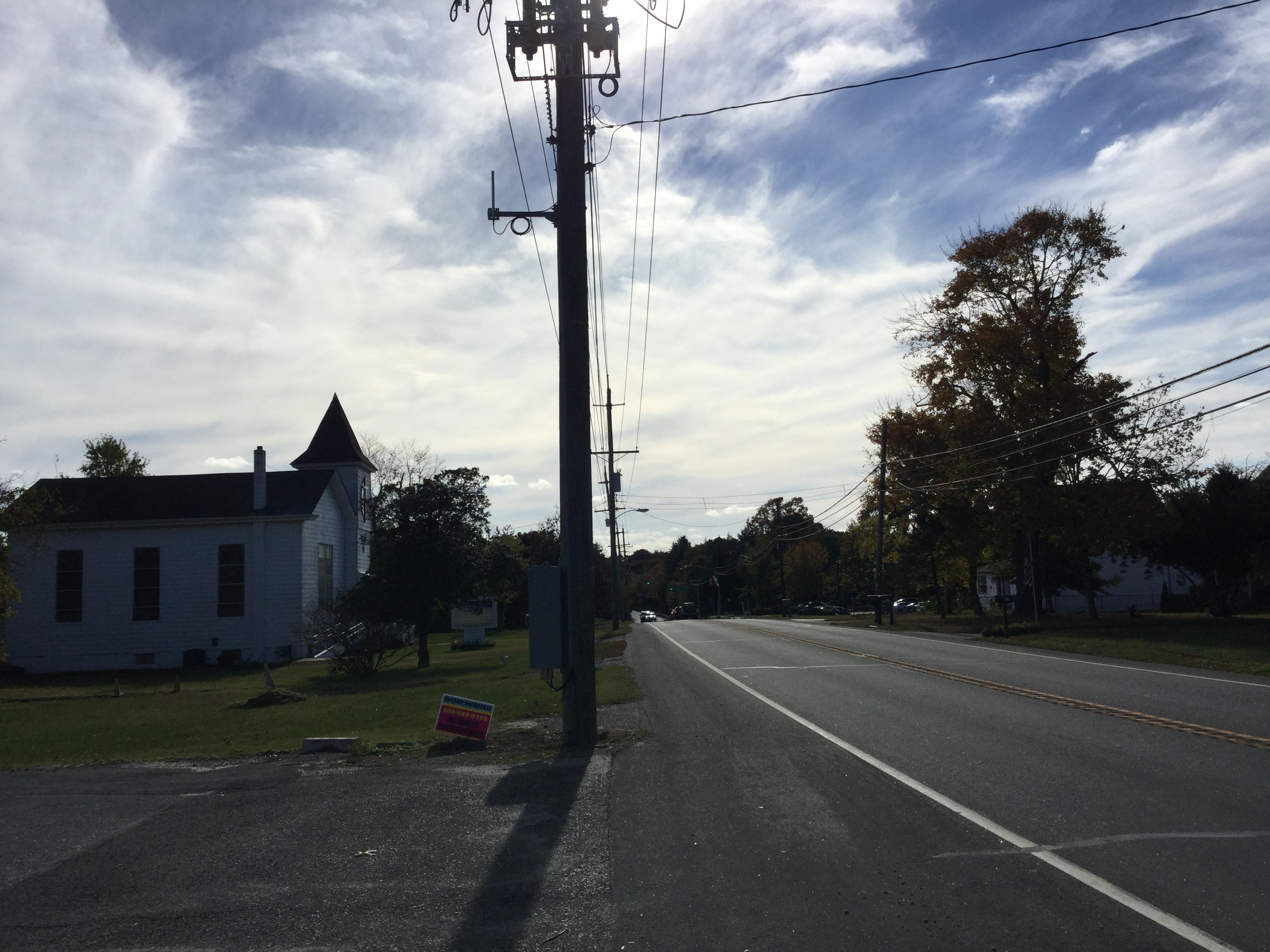
- View southward along New York Road in Oceanville

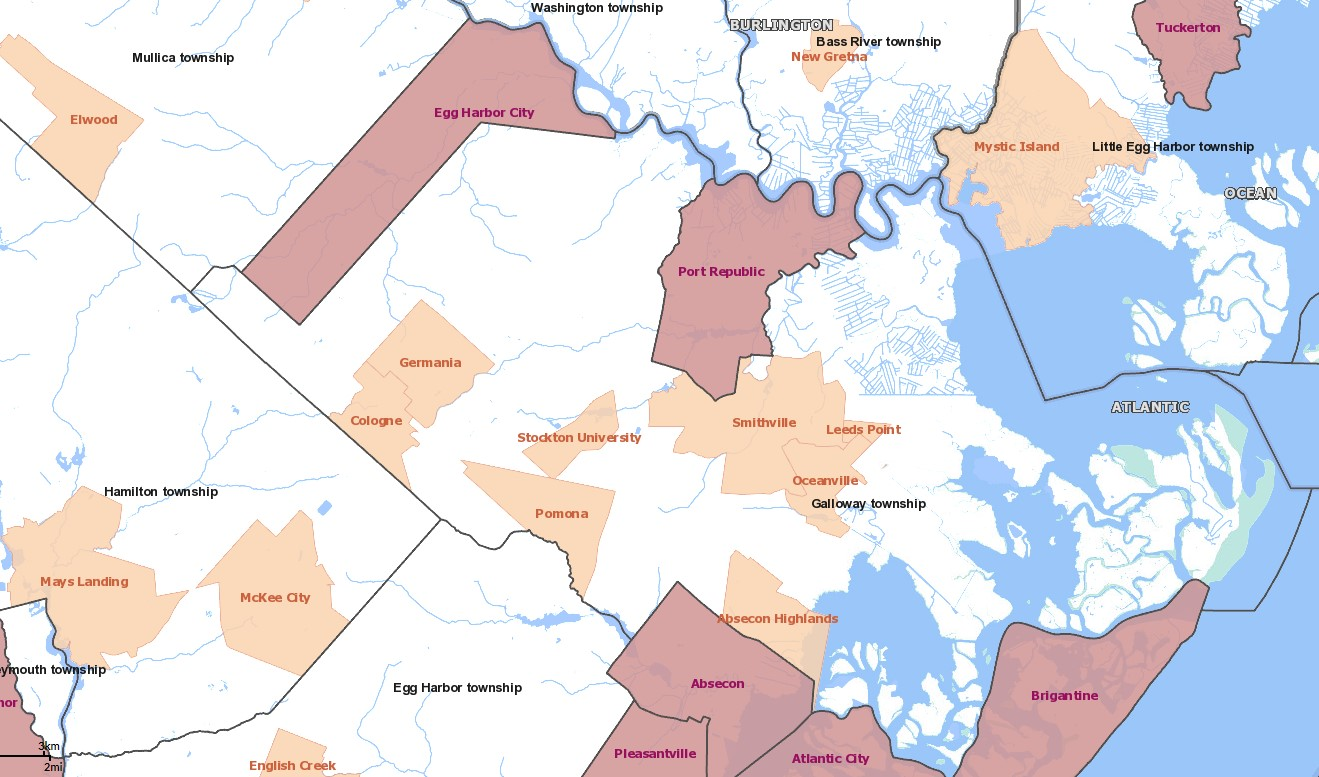

- Location in Atlantic County Location in New Jersey Location in the United States
- Coordinates: 39°28′16″N 74°27′38″W
- Country: United States
- State: New Jersey
- County: Atlantic
- Township: Galloway

Area
  - Total: 1.61 sq mi (4.18 km^{2})
  - Land: 1.58 sq mi (4.08 km^{2})
  - Water: 0.039 sq mi (0.10 km^{2})
- Elevation: 43 ft (13 m)

Population (2020)
  - Total: 793
  - Density: 505.1/sq mi (195.0/km^{2})
- Time zone: UTC−05:00 (Eastern (EST))
  - Summer (DST): UTC−04:00 (Eastern (EDT))
- ZIP Code: 08231
- Area codes: 609, 640
- FIPS code: 34-54630
- GNIS feature ID: 878942

Oceanville is an unincorporated community and census-designated place (CDP) located within Galloway Township in Atlantic County, in the U.S. state of New Jersey. At the 2020 United States census, the CDP's population was 793.

Oceanville is located on U.S. Route 9 approximately 3.5 miles (5.6 km) north-northeast of Absecon. The community has a post office with ZIP Code 08231.

From 1983–2016, Oceanville was the site of the Noyes Museum, the only fine arts museum in Atlantic County. The museum became part of Stockton University in 2016 and the site in Oceanville will be sold by the foundation that owns the property.

== Demographics ==
Historical population
Census	Pop.	Note	%±
2020	793		—
U.S. Decennial Census; 2020

Oceanville was first listed as a census designated place in the 2020 U.S. census.

Oceanville CDP, New Jersey – Racial and ethnic composition Note: the US Census treats Hispanic/Latino as an ethnic category. This table excludes Latinos from the racial categories and assigns them to a separate category. Hispanics/Latinos may be of any race.
Race / Ethnicity (NH = Non-Hispanic)	Pop 2020	2020
White alone (NH)	609	76.80%
Black or African American alone (NH)	38	4.79%
Native American or Alaska Native alone (NH)	1	0.13%
Asian alone (NH)	29	3.66%
Native Hawaiian or Pacific Islander alone (NH)	0	0.00%
Other race alone (NH)	5	0.63%
Mixed race or Multiracial (NH)	33	4.16%
Hispanic or Latino (any race)	78	9.84%
Total	793	100.00%

As of the 2020 United States census, the population was 793.

== Education ==
Oceanville, like other parts of the township, is zoned to Galloway Township School District (GTPS) (K-8) and Absegami High School of the Greater Egg Harbor Regional High School District.

Oceanville Kindergarten Learning Center was formerly in the community. Formerly Oceanville School, the building opened around 1927. It closed in 2010. The facility now houses GTPS facilities such as the food service department.
