= Edwin B. Forsythe National Wildlife Refuge =

National Wildlife Refuge in New Jersey, US

- IUCN category IV (habitat/species management area)
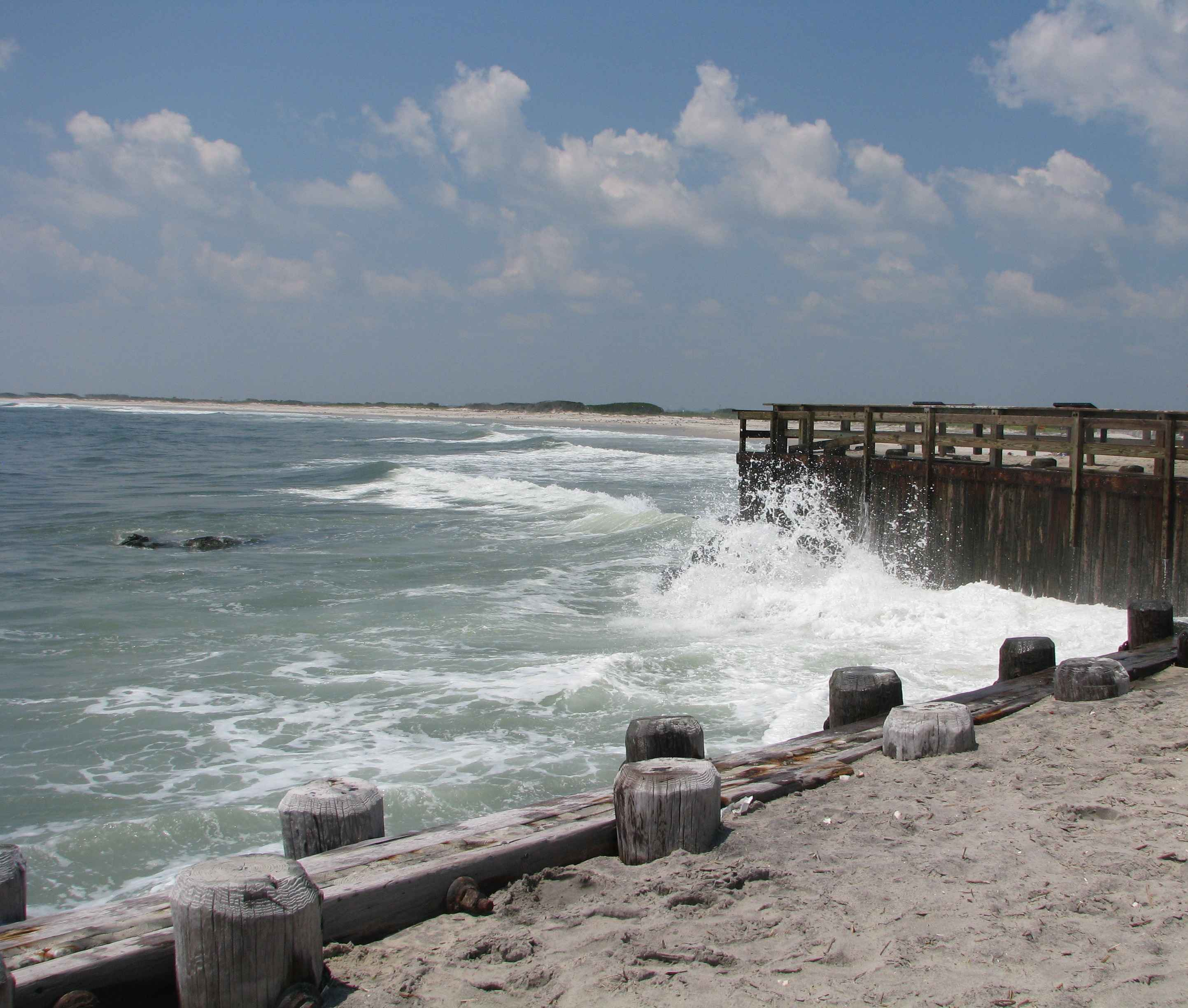
- Holgate Beach, part of the Edwin B. Forsythe National Wildlife Refuge, managed by the U.S. Fish and Wildlife Service, is situated at the southern tip of Long Beach Island, within Long Beach Township, Ocean County, New Jersey, U.S., on the Jersey Shore.

- Location within the United States
- Location: Atlantic and Ocean counties, New Jersey, United States
- Nearest city: Oceanville, New Jersey
- Coordinates: 39°27′53″N 74°27′0″W
- Area: 47,437.17 acres (191.9714 km^{2})
- Established: 1984
- Governing body: U.S. Fish and Wildlife Service
- Website: Edwin B. Forsythe National Wildlife Refuge

Ramsar Wetland
- Designated: 18 December 1986
- Reference no.: 348

The Edwin B. Forsythe National Wildlife Refuge is a U.S. National Wildlife Refuge located in southern and south-central New Jersey, along the Atlantic coast, north of Atlantic City, in Atlantic and Ocean counties. The refuge was created in 1984 out of two existing refuge parcels created to protect tidal wetland and shallow bay habitat for migratory water birds. The Barnegat Division (established in 1967) is located in Ocean County on the inland side of Barnegat Bay. The Brigantine Division (established in 1939) is located approximately 10 miles (16 km) north of Atlantic City along the south bank of the mouth of the Mullica River. The two divisions are separated by approximately 20 miles (32 km). The refuge is located along most active flight paths of the Atlantic Flyway, making it an important link in the network of national wildlife refuges administered nationwide by the U.S. Fish and Wildlife Service. Forsythe Refuge is a part of the Hudson River/New York Bight Ecosystem and The New Jersey Coastal Heritage Trail Route. The refuge is named for Edwin B. Forsythe, conservationist Congressman from New Jersey. The refuge was named as a Ramsar Site of international importance in 1986.

== Description ==
The Refuge protects more than 40,000 acres (162 km^{2}) of southern New Jersey Coastal Habitats and tidal wetlands. 6,000 acres (24 km^{2}) of the refuge are designated as a wilderness area. These areas include Holgate and Little Beach, two of the few remaining undeveloped barrier beaches in the state. Here the rare piping plover and other beach-nesting birds raise their young, so public access is limited or even entirely prohibited at times.

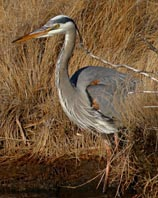
Great blue heron

The beach areas provide fragile ecosystems for birds whose populations have already been impacted by development, so Holgate is closed to all public during the nesting season; Little Beach is closed all year except by special permit for research or education. Almost 90% of Forsythe Refuge is tidal salt marsh, interspersed with shallow coves and bays. Each year thousands of ducks and geese, wading birds and shorebirds concentrate here during spring and fall migration, making the Refuge a good site for birdwatching, nature photography and related activities. More than 3,000 acres (12 km^{2}) of the Refuge are woodlands with a wide variety of tree and plant species, thus also providing vital habitat for a variety of upland species such as songbirds, woodcock, white-tailed deer and box turtles.

Primary access to this refuge is by automobile and bicycle. While there are no specific guided programs, visitors may drive an eight-mile (13 km) long trail over dams guided by a brochure which points out the various features. Foot travelers can walk one of four trails which range from 1/4 mile (0.4 km) to 4 miles (6.4 km) in length.

== Sedimentary pollution ==
A team from the University of Pennsylvania and the British Geological Survey have measured organic pollutants and mercury in the sediments within the refuge and Barnegat Bay and Little Egg Harbor. Polychlorinated biphenyl (PCB) and polyaromatic hydrocarbons (PAH) were found in low amounts in creek and marsh sediments. Evaluation of the PAH compound distribution suggested that most of the creeks received small amounts of PAH derived from burning of wood or coal and or traffic sources.
