= CCTS =

CCTS may refer to:

- Camden County Technical Schools (United States, Gloucester or Pennsauken)
- Cooperation Council of Turkic-Speaking States (Eurasia)
- Commission for Complaints for Telecom-television Services (Canada, nationwide)
- Crow Creek Tribal School (South Dakota, United States)
