= Audubon Park, New Jersey =

Borough in Camden County, New Jersey, US

- Borough
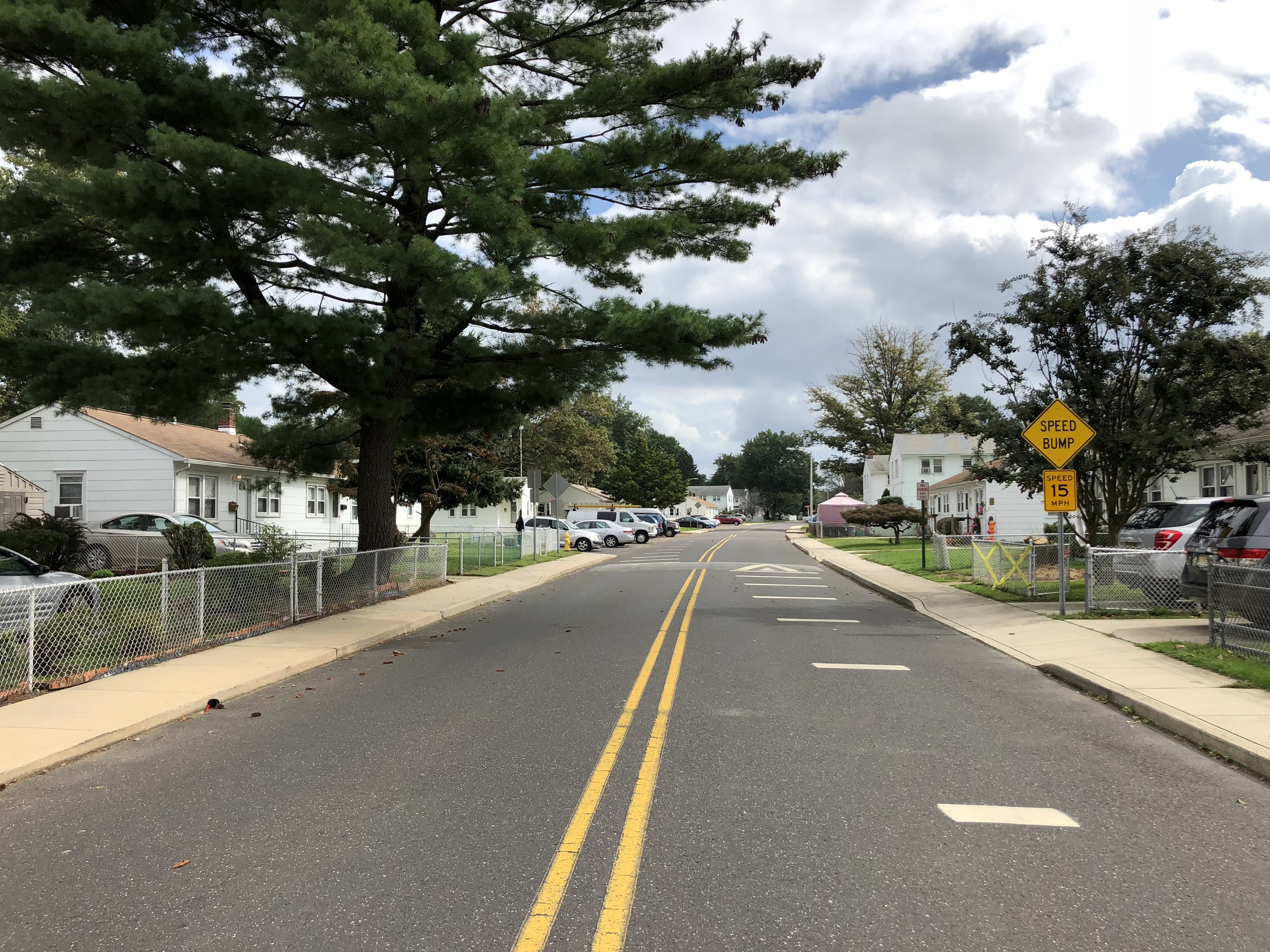
- Eastbound along Road A showing typical residences in the borough

- Logo
- Motto: We live somewhere special
- Location of Audubon Park in Camden County highlighted in red (right). Inset map: Location of Camden County in New Jersey highlighted in orange (left).

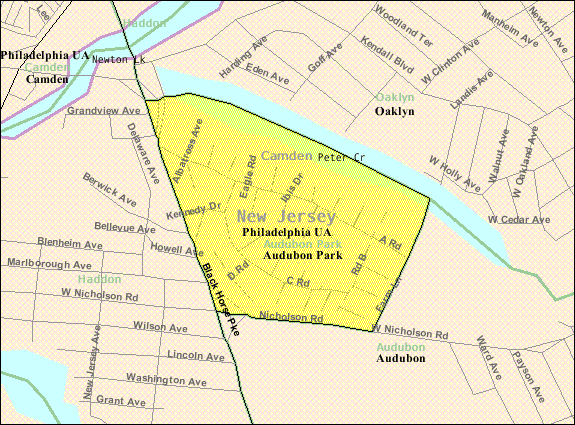
- Census Bureau map of Audubon Park, New Jersey

- Location in Camden County Location in New Jersey Location in the United States
- Coordinates: 39.896837°N 75.088819°W
- Country: United States
- State: New Jersey
- County: Camden
- Incorporated: October 28, 1947
- Named for: John James Audubon

Government
  - Type: Borough
  - Body: Borough Council
  - Mayor: Brian Burns (D, serving unexpired term ending December 31, 2026)
  - Municipal clerk: Ryan Giles

Area
  - Total: 0.17 sq mi (0.44 km^{2})
  - Land: 0.15 sq mi (0.39 km^{2})
  - Water: 0.019 sq mi (0.05 km^{2}) 10.59%
  - Rank: 561st of 565 in state 37th of 37 in county
- Elevation: 20 ft (6.1 m)

Population (2020)
  - Total: 991
  - Estimate (2023): 990
  - Rank: 533rd of 565 in state 34th of 37 in county
  - Density: 6,587.9/sq mi (2,543.6/km^{2})
  - Rank: 77th of 565 in state 4th of 37 in county
- Time zone: UTC−05:00 (Eastern (EST))
  - Summer (DST): UTC−04:00 (Eastern (EDT))
- ZIP Code: 08106
- Area codes: 856 exchanges: 233, 337, 619, 916, 962
- FIPS code: 3400702230
- GNIS feature ID: 0885145
- Website: www.audubonparknj.org

Audubon Park is a borough in Camden County, in the southern portion of the U.S. state of New Jersey. As of the 2020 United States census, the borough's population was 991, a decrease of 32 (−3.1%) from the 2010 census count of 1,023, which in turn had reflected a decline of 79 (−7.2%) from the 1,102 counted at the 2000 census. The borough is the fifth-smallest municipality in the state by area.

Audubon Park was incorporated as a borough on July 3, 1947, from portions of Audubon Borough, based upon the results of a referendum held on October 28, 1947, making it the newest municipality in Camden County. Audubon Park is a dry town where alcohol is not permitted to be sold by law.

Audubon Park had the third-highest property tax rate in New Jersey, with an equalized rate of 6.311% in 2020, compared to 3.470% in Camden County and a statewide average of 2.279%.

== History ==
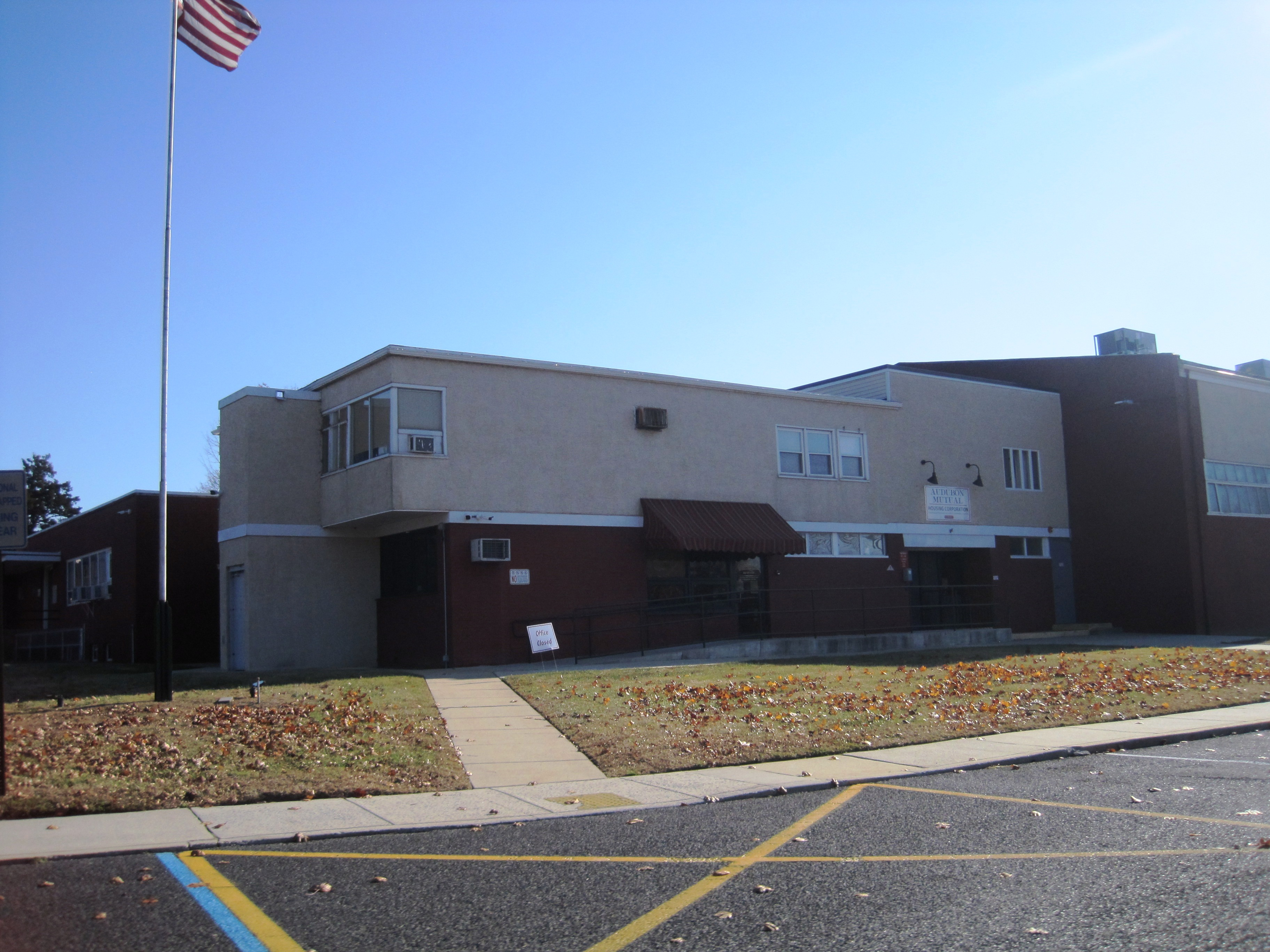
Audubon Mutual Housing Corporation offices

Audubon Park was established as a community within Audubon in 1941 with the construction of 500 housing units for employees of New York Shipbuilding in Camden, New Jersey. It is named for naturalist John James Audubon. This was the first of eight projects undertaken by the Mutual Ownership Defense Housing Division of the Federal Works Agency under the leadership of Colonel Lawrence Westbrook. Residents of Audubon, seeking to rid itself of the development's Democratic voters and its public school students, pushed for and passed a referendum to form Audubon Park in 1947. The Audubon Mutual Housing Corporation owns and administers all property in the borough and in turn is responsible for renting homes to residents.

== Geography ==
According to the United States Census Bureau, the borough had a total area of 0.17 square miles (0.44 km^{2}), including 0.15 square miles (0.39 km^{2}) of land and 0.02 square miles (0.05 km^{2}) of water (10.59%).

Audubon Park borders the Camden County municipalities of Audubon, Haddon Township and Oaklyn.

== Demographics ==
Historical population
Census	Pop.	Note	%±
1950	1,859		—
1960	1,713		−7.9%
1970	1,492		−12.9%
1980	1,274		−14.6%
1990	1,150		−9.7%
2000	1,102		−4.2%
2010	1,023		−7.2%
2020	991		−3.1%
2023 (est.)	990	▼	−0.1%
Population sources:1950–2000 1950–2000; 2010 2020

=== 2010 census ===
The 2010 United States census counted 1,023 people, 493 households, and 282 families in the borough. The population density was 7,046.7 per square mile (2,720.7/km^{2}). There were 499 housing units at an average density of 3,437.3 per square mile (1,327.1/km^{2}). The racial makeup was 97.95% (1,002) White, 0.29% (3) Black or African American, 0.10% (1) Native American, 0.29% (3) Asian, 0.00% (0) Pacific Islander, 0.10% (1) from other races, and 1.27% (13) from two or more races. Hispanic or Latino of any race were 2.05% (21) of the population.

Of the 493 households, 15.2% had children under the age of 18; 35.3% were married couples living together; 18.1% had a female householder with no husband present and 42.8% were non-families. Of all households, 37.3% were made up of individuals and 18.5% had someone living alone who was 65 years of age or older. The average household size was 2.08 and the average family size was 2.70.

13.3% of the population were under the age of 18, 7.9% from 18 to 24, 21.9% from 25 to 44, 30.9% from 45 to 64, and 26.0% who were 65 years of age or older. The median age was 48.7 years. For every 100 females, the population had 77.3 males. For every 100 females ages 18 and older there were 75.0 males.

The Census Bureau's 2006–2010 American Community Survey showed that (in 2010 inflation-adjusted dollars) median household income was $41,726 (with a margin of error of +/− $5,661) and the median family income was $53,036 (+/− $8,477). Males had a median income of $46,176 (+/− $8,213) versus $38,036 (+/− $5,655) for females. The per capita income for the borough was $23,855 (+/− $2,141). About 5.7% of families and 7.4% of the population were below the poverty line, including 12.0% of those under age 18 and 7.9% of those age 65 or over.

=== 2000 census ===
As of the 2000 United States census there were 1,102 people, 496 households, and 302 families residing in the borough. The population density was 7,561.7 inhabitants per square mile (2,919.6/km^{2}). There were 499 housing units at an average density of 3,424.1 per square mile (1,322.1/km^{2}). The racial makeup of the borough was 98.91% White, 0.36% African American, 0.09% Native American, 0.18% Asian, 0.09% from other races, and 0.36% from two or more races. Hispanic or Latino of any race were 0.64% of the population.

There were 496 households, out of which 22.0% had children under the age of 18 living with them, 40.7% were married couples living together, 16.5% had a female householder with no husband present, and 39.1% were non-families. 35.3% of all households were made up of individuals, and 15.3% had someone living alone who was 65 years of age or older. The average household size was 2.22 and the average family size was 2.88.

In the borough the population was spread out, with 21.2% under the age of 18, 4.9% from 18 to 24, 28.5% from 25 to 44, 27.0% from 45 to 64, and 18.3% who were 65 years of age or older. The median age was 42 years. For every 100 females, there were 80.7 males. For every 100 females age 18 and over, there were 73.9 males.

The median income for a household in the borough was $34,643, and the median income for a family was $41,029. Males had a median income of $36,250 versus $25,662 for females. The per capita income for the borough was $16,926. About 9.0% of families and 8.8% of the population were below the poverty line, including 9.1% of those under age 18 and 8.0% of those age 65 or over.

== Government ==
=== Local government ===
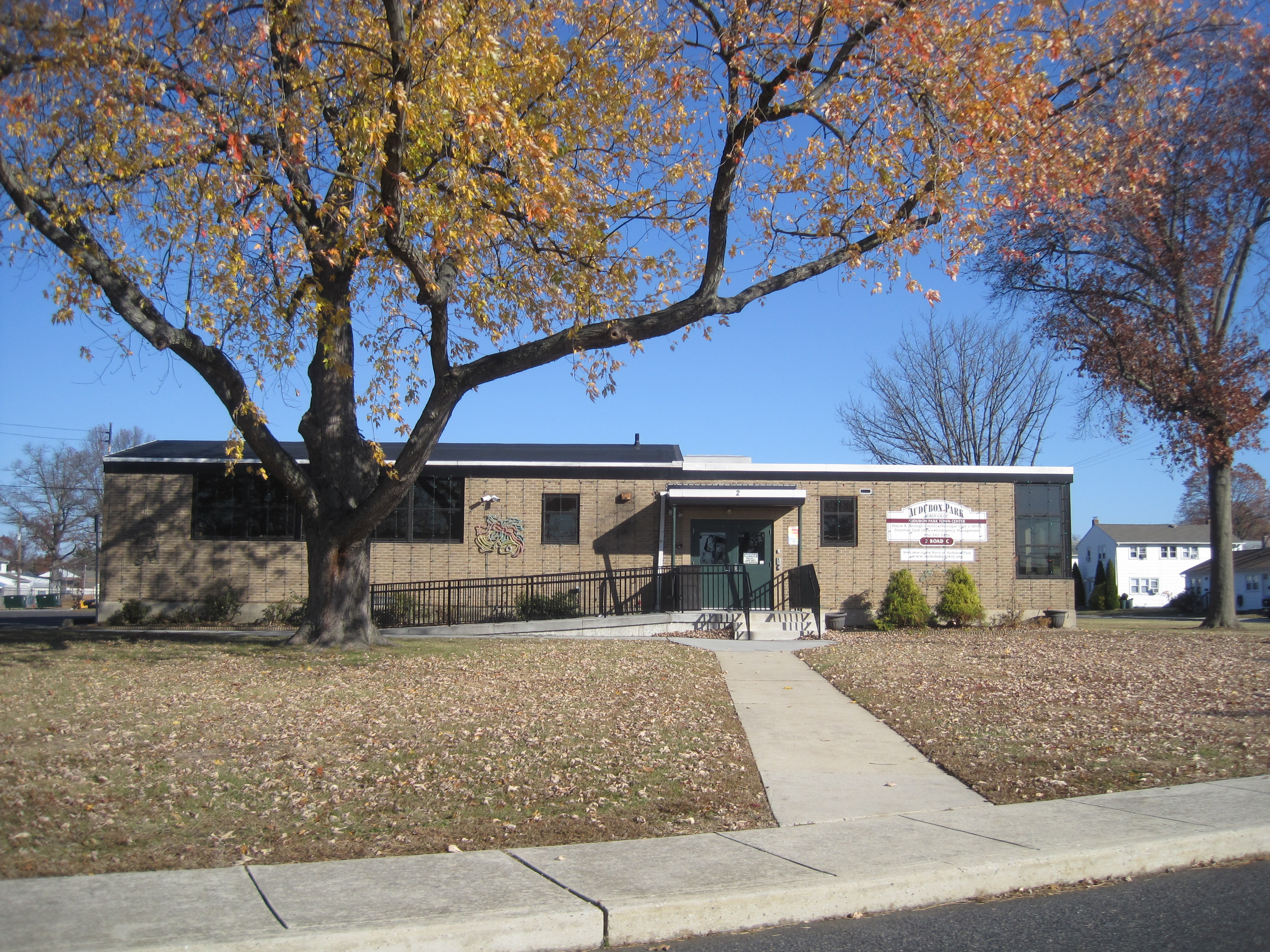
Borough of Audubon Park Town Center

Audubon Park is governed under the borough form of New Jersey municipal government, which is used in 218 municipalities (of the 564) statewide, making it the most common form of government in New Jersey. The governing body is comprised of a mayor and a borough council, with all positions elected at-large on a partisan basis as part of the November general election. A mayor is elected directly by the voters to a four-year term of office. The borough council includes six members elected to serve three-year terms on a staggered basis, with two seats coming up for election each year in a three-year cycle. The borough form of government used by Audubon Park is a "weak mayor / strong council" government in which council members act as the legislative body with the mayor presiding at meetings and voting only in the event of a tie. The mayor can veto ordinances subject to an override by a two-thirds majority vote of the council. The mayor makes committee and liaison assignments for council members, and most appointments are made by the mayor with the advice and consent of the council.

As of 2026, the mayor of Audubon Park is Democrat Brian Burns, who was elected to serve the balance of a term of office ending December 31, 2026. Members of the Borough Council are Council President Karen Lewis (D, 2026), Judith DiPasquale (D, 2026), Thomas Geobel (D, 2028), James M. Hassett (R, 2028), Cathleen Lowe (D, 2027) and Amy Paratore (D, 2027).

Brian Burns was elected to fill the vacancy created after Larry Pennock resigned from a term of office ending December 31, 2026.

In May 2012, the borough council chose Judy DiPasquale from among a list of three names provided to fill the vacant seat of Charles Beeman.

=== Federal, state and county representation ===
Audubon Park is located in the 1st Congressional district and is part of New Jersey's 6th state legislative district.

For the 119th United States Congress, New Jersey's 1st congressional district is represented by Donald Norcross (D, Camden). New Jersey is represented in the United States Senate by Democrats Cory Booker (Newark, term ends 2027) and Andy Kim (Moorestown, term ends 2031).

For the 2026–2027 session, the 6th legislative district of the New Jersey Legislature is represented in the State Senate by James Beach (D, Voorhees Township) and in the General Assembly by Louis Greenwald (D, Voorhees Township) and Melinda Kane (D, Cherry Hill).

Camden County is governed by a Board of County Commissioners composed of seven members chosen at-large in partisan elections for three-year terms on a staggered basis by the residents of the county, with either two or three seats up for election each year as part of the November general election. At a reorganization meeting held in January after each election, the newly constituted Board of Commissioners selects one member to serve as Director and another as Deputy Director, each serving a one-year term in that role. As of 2025, Camden County's Commissioners are: Commissioner Director Louis Cappelli Jr. (D, Collingswood, 2026), Commissioner Deputy Director Edward T. McDonnell (D, Pennsauken Township, 2025), Virginia Ruiz Betteridge (D, Runnemede, 2025), Almar Dyer (D, Pennsauken Township, 2027), Melinda Kane (D, Cherry Hill, 2027), Jeffrey L. Nash (D, Winslow Township, 2027), and Jonathan L. Young Sr. (D, Berlin Township, 2026).

Camden County's constitutional officers are: Clerk Pamela Rosen Lampitt (D, Cherry Hill, 2029) Sheriff Chuck Billingham (D, Gloucester City, 2027) and Surrogate Michelle Gentek-Mayer (D, Gloucester Township, 2025).

=== Politics ===
As of March 2011, there were a total of 800 registered voters in Audubon Park, of which 535 (66.9% vs. 31.7% countywide) were registered as Democrats, 55 (6.9% vs. 21.1%) were registered as Republicans and 210 (26.3% vs. 47.1%) were registered as Unaffiliated. There were no voters registered to other parties. Among the borough's 2010 Census population, 78.2% (vs. 57.1% in Camden County) were registered to vote, including 90.2% of those ages 18 and over (vs. 73.7% countywide).

Gubernatorial election results for Audubon Park
Year	Republican		Democratic		Third party(ies)	
Year	No.	%	No.	%	No.	%
2025	197	42.73%	261	56.62%	3	0.65%
2021	171	44.53%	211	54.95%	2	0.52%
2017	104	38.10%	158	57.88%	11	4.03%
2013	216	69.45%	93	29.90%	2	0.64%
2009	137	39.37%	184	52.87%	27	7.76%
2005	87	24.72%	242	68.75%	23	6.53%

In the 2012 presidential election, Democrat Barack Obama received 368 votes (67.9% vs. 54.8% countywide), ahead of Republican Mitt Romney with 164 votes (30.3% vs. 43.5%) and other candidates with 7 votes (1.3% vs. 0.9%), among the 542 ballots cast by the borough's 832 registered voters, for a turnout of 65.1% (vs. 70.4% in Camden County). In the 2008 presidential election, Democrat Barack Obama received 374 votes (64.5% vs. 66.2% countywide), ahead of Republican John McCain with 183 votes (31.6% vs. 30.7%) and other candidates with 17 votes (2.9% vs. 1.1%), among the 580 ballots cast by the borough's 814 registered voters, for a turnout of 71.3% (vs. 71.4% in Camden County). In the 2004 presidential election, Democrat John Kerry received 425 votes (69.0% vs. 61.7% countywide), ahead of Republican George W. Bush with 183 votes (29.7% vs. 36.4%) and other candidates with 2 votes (0.3% vs. 0.8%), among the 616 ballots cast by the borough's 810 registered voters, for a turnout of 76.0% (vs. 71.3% in the whole county).

United States presidential election results for Audubon Park
Year	Republican		Democratic		Third party(ies)	
Year	No.	%	No.	%	No.	%
2024	274	47.82%	291	50.79%	8	1.40%
2020	292	46.13%	336	53.08%	5	0.79%
2016	234	43.09%	294	54.14%	15	2.76%
2012	164	30.43%	368	68.27%	7	1.30%
2008	183	31.88%	374	65.16%	17	2.96%
2004	183	30.00%	425	69.67%	2	0.33%

In the 2013 gubernatorial election, Republican Chris Christie received 69.5% of the vote (216 cast), ahead of Democrat Barbara Buono with 29.9% (93 votes), and other candidates with 0.6% (2 votes), among the 323 ballots cast by the borough's 831 registered voters (12 ballots were spoiled), for a turnout of 38.9%. In the 2009 gubernatorial election, Democrat Jon Corzine received 184 ballots cast (52.0% vs. 53.8% countywide), ahead of Republican Chris Christie with 137 votes (38.7% vs. 38.5%), Independent Chris Daggett with 18 votes (5.1% vs. 4.5%) and other candidates with 9 votes (2.5% vs. 1.1%), among the 354 ballots cast by the borough's 809 registered voters, yielding a 43.8% turnout (vs. 40.8% in the county).

United States Senate election results for Audubon Park1
Year	Republican		Democratic		Third party(ies)	
Year	No.	%	No.	%	No.	%
2024	208	39.10%	318	59.77%	6	1.13%
2018	219	47.51%	203	44.03%	39	8.46%
2012	133	27.14%	350	71.43%	7	1.43%
2006	106	29.12%	236	64.84%	22	6.04%

United States Senate election results for Audubon Park2
Year	Republican		Democratic		Third party(ies)	
Year	No.	%	No.	%	No.	%
2020	254	41.44%	349	56.93%	10	1.63%
2014	92	30.07%	208	67.97%	6	1.96%
2013	71	43.83%	88	54.32%	3	1.85%
2008	142	28.29%	349	69.52%	11	2.19%

== Education ==
Audubon Park is a non-operating school district, having closed its lone school in 1979, after which students were sent outside of the borough as part of a sending/receiving relationship. Public school students from Audubon Park attend school in Audubon, having been consolidated into the Audubon School District. The Audubon School District serves public school students in pre-kindergarten through twelfth grade. As of the 2020–21 school year, the district, comprised of three schools, had an enrollment of 1,463 students and 122.2 classroom teachers (on an FTE basis), for a student–teacher ratio of 12.0:1. Schools in the district (with 2020–21 enrollment data from the National Center for Education Statistics) are Haviland Avenue School with 254 students in grades PreK-2, Mansion Avenue School with 372 students in grades 3-6 and Audubon High School with 818 students in grades 7-12.

Students from Audubon Park, and from all of Camden County, are eligible to attend the Camden County Technical Schools, a countywide public school district that serves the vocational and technical education needs of students at the high school and post-secondary level at Gloucester Township Technical High School in the Sicklerville section of Gloucester Township or Pennsauken Technical High School in Pennsauken Township. Students are accepted based on district admission standards and costs of attendance and transportation are covered by the home district of each student.

== Transportation ==
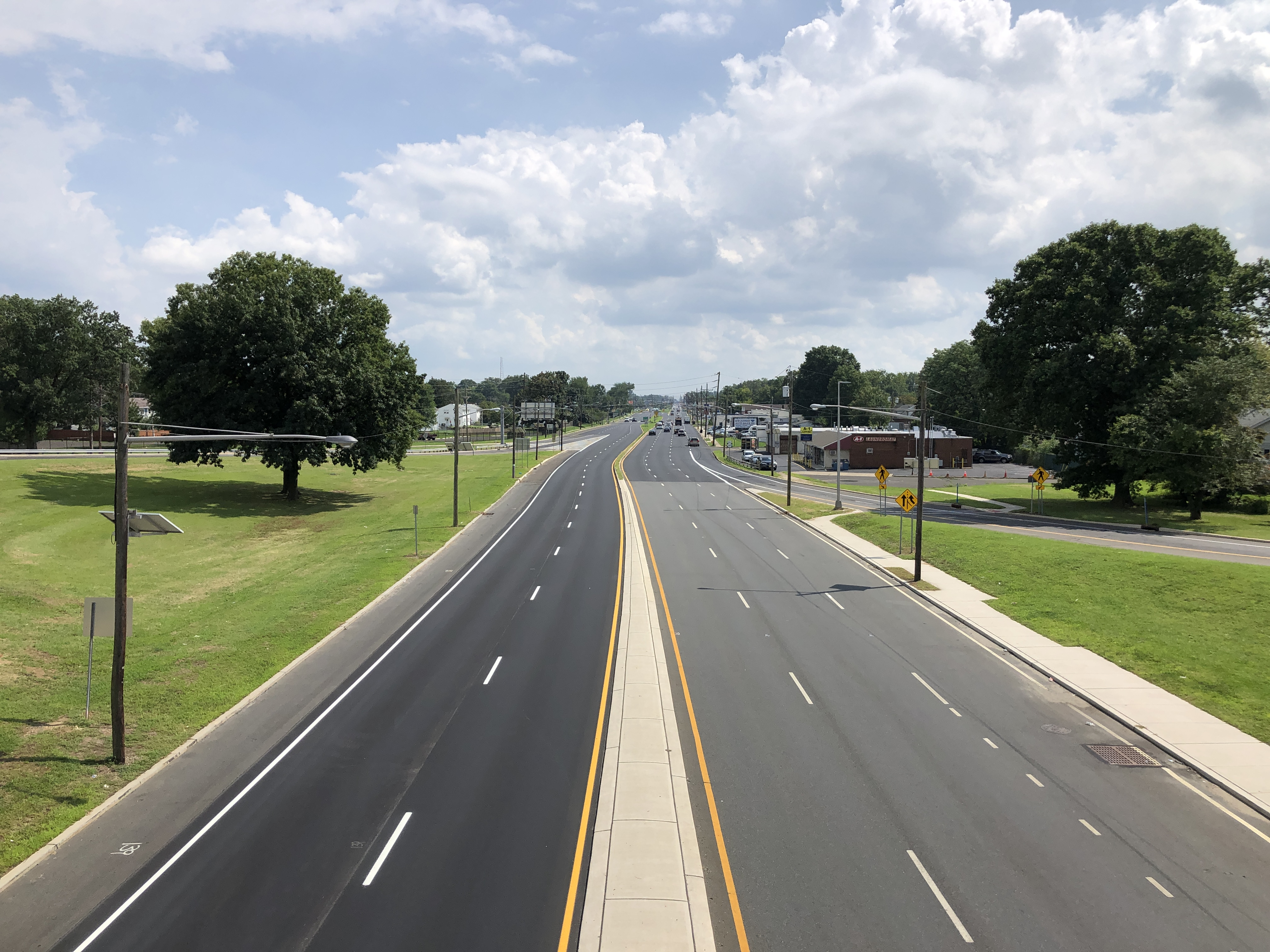
Route 168 southbound on the west edge of Audubon Park

=== Roads and highways ===
As of May 2010, the borough had a total of 3.07 miles (4.94 km) of roadways, of which 2.48 miles (3.99 km) were maintained by the municipality, 0.11 miles (0.18 km) by Camden County, 0.28 miles (0.45 km) by the New Jersey Department of Transportation and 0.20 miles (0.32 km) by the Delaware River Port Authority.

Route 168 (Black Horse Pike) runs for 0.3 miles (0.48 km) from Audubon to Haddon Township.

A small 0.2 miles (0.32 km) piece of New Jersey Route 76C connects Route 168 in Audubon Park to Interstate 76 and Interstate 676.

=== Public transportation ===
NJ Transit bus service is available in the borough on routes 400 (between Sicklerville in Winslow Township and Philadelphia) and 450 (between the Cherry Hill Mall and Camden).
