= Audubon, New Jersey =

Borough in Camden County, New Jersey, US

- Borough
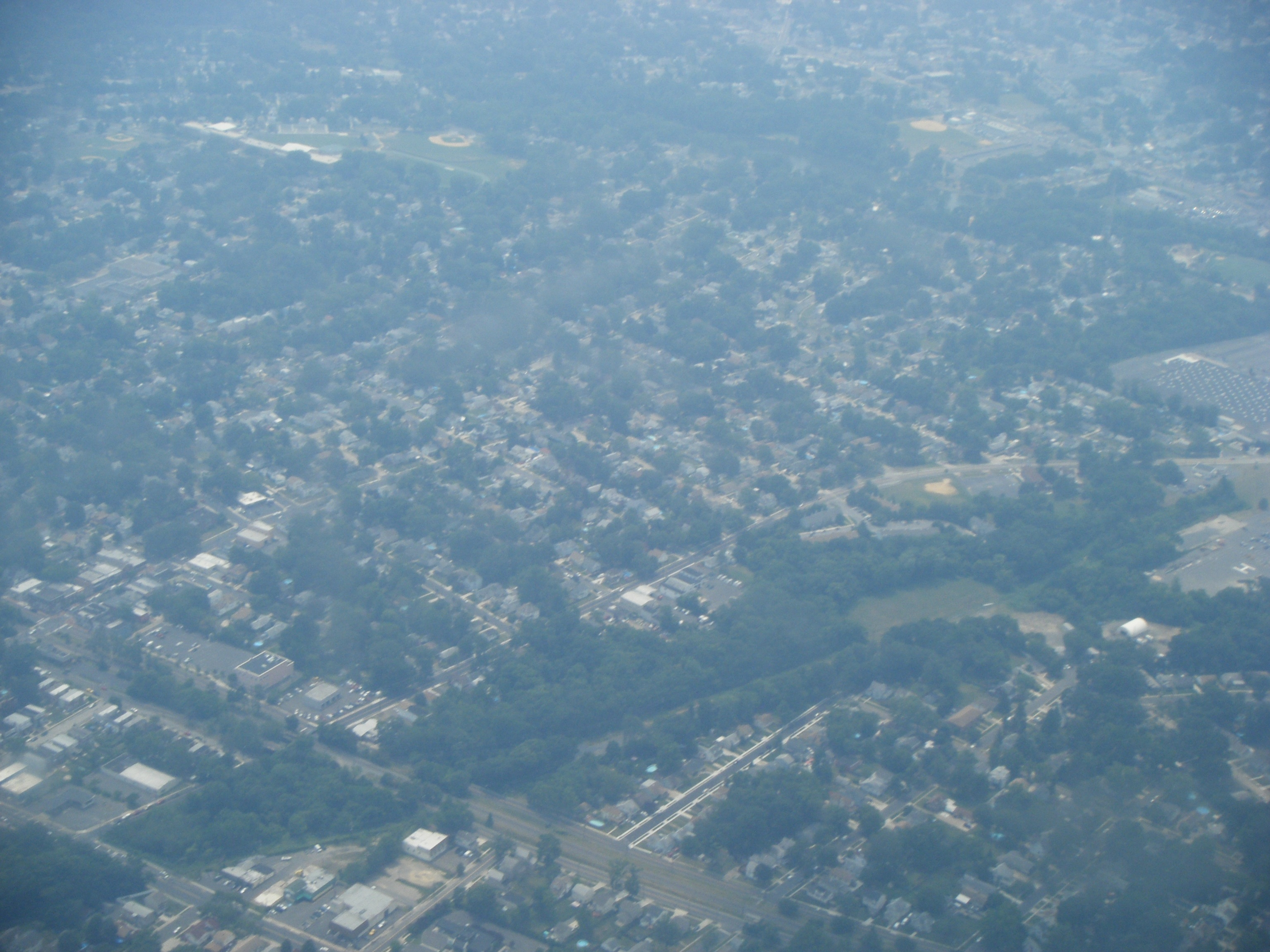
- Aerial view of suburban Audubon, New Jersey

- Seal

- Location of Audubon in Camden County highlighted in red (right). Inset map: Location of Camden County in New Jersey highlighted in orange (left).

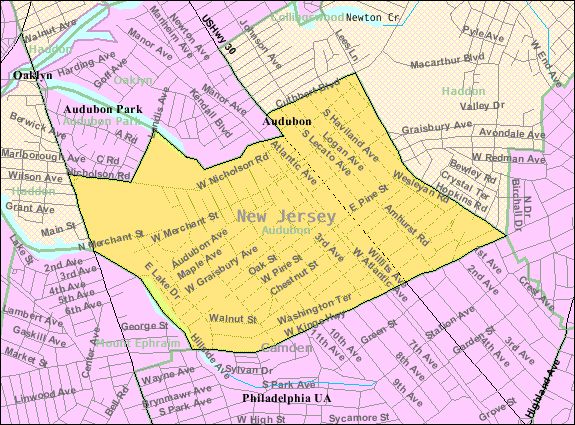
- Census Bureau map of Audubon, New Jersey

- Location in Camden County Location in New Jersey Location in the United States
- Coordinates: 39.890128°N 75.072382°W
- Country: United States
- State: New Jersey
- County: Camden
- Incorporated: March 13, 1905
- Named for: John James Audubon

Government
  - Type: Walsh Act
  - Body: Board of Commissioners
  - Mayor: Robert Jakubowski (term ends May 1, 2029)
  - Administrator: Danielle Ingves
  - Municipal clerk: Danielle Ingves

Area
  - Total: 1.49 sq mi (3.87 km^{2})
  - Land: 1.48 sq mi (3.84 km^{2})
  - Water: 0.015 sq mi (0.04 km^{2}) 0.93%
  - Rank: 451st of 565 in state 24th of 37 in county
- Elevation: 56 ft (17 m)

Population (2020)
  - Total: 8,707
  - Estimate (2023): 8,716
  - Rank: 275th of 565 in state 15th of 37 in county
  - Density: 5,875.2/sq mi (2,268.4/km^{2})
  - Rank: 92nd of 565 in state 7th of 37 in county
- Time zone: UTC−05:00 (Eastern (EST))
  - Summer (DST): UTC−04:00 (Eastern (EDT))
- ZIP Code: 08106
- Area codes: 856 exchanges: 233, 337, 619, 916, 962
- FIPS code: 3400702200
- GNIS feature ID: 0885144
- Website: www.audubonnj.com

Audubon is a borough in Camden County, in the southern portion of the U.S. state of New Jersey. As of the 2020 United States census, the borough's population was 8,707, a decrease of 112 (−1.3%) from the 2010 census count of 8,819, which in turn had reflected a decline of 363 (−4.0%) from the 9,182 counted at the 2000 census. Located right outside of Philadelphia and the city of Camden, Audubon constitutes part of the Philadelphia metropolitan area.

== History ==
The area that was to become Audubon was initially settled in the late 17th Century by various land owners and was primarily used for farms and mills. In 1695 the land now known as the Borough of Audubon was part of Newton Township. By the early 1700s, the area's first families were building their homesteads. Today, two of these original farmhouses remain in Audubon. The Low-Stokes-Nicholson house was built c. 1732 by John Low. Simon Breach built his home, known locally as "The Mansion House", in about 1740. A large addition was built by shipbuilder John Dialogue in c. 1853. Samuel Nicholson Rhodes, a local naturalist and author, owned this farm, which he named "Cedarcroft", from 1898 to 1912. It was Mrs. Rhodes who came up with the name for the town. When the Atlantic City Railroad arrived in the 1880s the local farms were subdivided into the smaller communities of Audubon, Cedarcroft and Orston. Residential development began when both Audubon and Orston had train stations built in the 1890s.

On March 13, 1905, through an act of the New Jersey Legislature, Audubon was created as a borough from portions of Haddon Township. It was named for John James Audubon, the naturalist. Based upon the results of a referendum on October 28, 1947, portions of Audubon were taken to form the borough of Audubon Park.

Audubon is the home of three Medal of Honor recipients, the most awarded per capita of any town in the United States: Samuel M. Sampler (World War I), Edward Clyde Benfold (Korean War) and Nelson V. Brittin (Korean War). The three are honored by a memorial at Audubon High School.

== Geography ==
According to the United States Census Bureau, the borough had a total area of 1.50 square miles (3.87 km^{2}), including 1.48 square miles (3.84 km^{2}) of land and 0.01 square miles (0.04 km^{2}) of water (0.93%).

Unincorporated communities, localities and place names located partially or completely within the borough include Orston.

Audubon borders Audubon Park, Haddon Heights, Haddon Township, Haddonfield, Mount Ephraim and Oaklyn.

=== Climate ===
The climate in the area is characterized by hot, humid summers and generally mild to cool winters. According to the Köppen Climate Classification system, Audubon has a humid subtropical climate, abbreviated "Cfa" on climate maps.

== Demographics ==
Historical population
| Census | Pop. | Note | %± |
|---|---|---|---|
| 1910 | 1,343 | | — |
| 1920 | 4,740 | | 252.9% |
| 1930 | 8,904 | | 87.8% |
| 1940 | 8,906 | | 0.0% |
| 1950 | 9,531 | | 7.0% |
| 1960 | 10,440 | | 9.5% |
| 1970 | 10,802 | | 3.5% |
| 1980 | 9,533 | | −11.7% |
| 1990 | 9,205 | | −3.4% |
| 2000 | 9,183 | | −0.2% |
| 2010 | 8,819 | | −4.0% |
| 2020 | 8,707 | | −1.3% |
| 2023 (est.) | 8,716 | ▲ | 0.1% |
Population sources: 1910–2000 1910–1920; 1910 1910–1930; 1940–2000; 2010 2020

=== 2020 census ===
As of the 2020 census, Audubon had a population of 8,707. The median age was 41.5 years. 19.7% of residents were under the age of 18 and 17.3% of residents were 65 years of age or older. For every 100 females there were 94.2 males, and for every 100 females age 18 and older there were 92.0 males age 18 and older.

100.0% of residents lived in urban areas, while 0.0% lived in rural areas.

There were 3,623 households in Audubon, of which 27.2% had children under the age of 18 living in them. Of all households, 46.0% were married-couple households, 17.4% were households with a male householder and no spouse or partner present, and 29.2% were households with a female householder and no spouse or partner present. About 31.1% of all households were made up of individuals and 13.5% had someone living alone who was 65 years of age or older.

There were 3,795 housing units, of which 4.5% were vacant. The homeowner vacancy rate was 1.8% and the rental vacancy rate was 4.4%.

Racial composition as of the 2020 census
| Race | Number | Percent |
|---|---|---|
| White | 7,758 | 89.1% |
| Black or African American | 195 | 2.2% |
| American Indian and Alaska Native | 10 | 0.1% |
| Asian | 102 | 1.2% |
| Native Hawaiian and Other Pacific Islander | 5 | 0.1% |
| Some other race | 154 | 1.8% |
| Two or more races | 483 | 5.5% |
| Hispanic or Latino (of any race) | 462 | 5.3% |

=== 2010 census ===
The 2010 United States census counted 8,819 people, 3,600 households, and 2,293 families in the borough. The population density was 5,925.7 per square mile (2,287.9/km^{2}). There were 3,779 housing units at an average density of 2,539.2 per square mile (980.4/km^{2}). The racial makeup was 95.23% (8,398) White, 1.44% (127) Black or African American, 0.14% (12) Native American, 1.13% (100) Asian, 0.01% (1) Pacific Islander, 0.91% (80) from other races, and 1.15% (101) from two or more races. Hispanic or Latino of any race were 3.29% (290) of the population.

Of the 3,600 households, 27.0% had children under the age of 18; 47.7% were married couples living together; 11.3% had a female householder with no husband present and 36.3% were non-families. Of all households, 30.1% were made up of individuals and 11.8% had someone living alone who was 65 years of age or older. The average household size was 2.45 and the average family size was 3.08.

21.2% of the population were under the age of 18, 8.3% from 18 to 24, 27.2% from 25 to 44, 30.1% from 45 to 64, and 13.2% who were 65 years of age or older. The median age was 40.4 years. For every 100 females, the population had 94.3 males. For every 100 females ages 18 and older there were 91.9 males.

The Census Bureau's 2006–2010 American Community Survey showed that (in 2010 inflation-adjusted dollars) median household income was $73,193 (with a margin of error of +/− $4,305) and the median family income was $89,399 (+/− $4,881). Males had a median income of $61,732 (+/− $4,152) versus $48,036 (+/− $4,880) for females. The per capita income for the borough was $34,243 (+/− $1,815). About 3.6% of families and 6.5% of the population were below the poverty line, including 13.6% of those under age 18 and 6.2% of those age 65 or over.

=== 2000 census ===
As of the 2000 United States census there were 9,182 people, 3,673 households, and 2,387 families residing in the borough. The population density was 6,162.3 inhabitants per square mile (2,379.3/km^{2}). There were 3,813 housing units at an average density of 2,559.0 per square mile (988.0/km^{2}). The racial makeup of the borough was 97.34% White, 1.51% Hispanic or Latino, 0.52% African American, 0.11% Native American, 0.89% Asian, 0.01% Pacific Islander, 0.48% from other races, and 0.64% from two or more races.

There were 3,673 households, out of which 30.9% had children under the age of 18 living with them, 49.6% were married couples living together, 11.8% had a female householder with no husband present, and 35.0% were non-families. 30.3% of all households were made up of individuals, and 13.7% had someone living alone who was 65 years of age or older. The average household size was 2.50 and the average family size was 3.16.

In the borough the population was spread out, with 24.8% under the age of 18, 7.0% from 18 to 24, 31.0% from 25 to 44, 21.3% from 45 to 64, and 15.9% who were 65 years of age or older. The median age was 38 years. For every 100 females, there were 91.7 males. For every 100 females age 18 and over, there were 86.5 males.

The median income for a household in the borough was $49,250, and the median income for a family was $59,115. Males had a median income of $45,650 versus $30,651 for females. The per capita income for the borough was $24,942. About 4.2% of families and 5.5% of the population were below the poverty line, including 6.1% of those under age 18 and 8.4% of those age 65 or over.

== Government ==
=== Local government ===
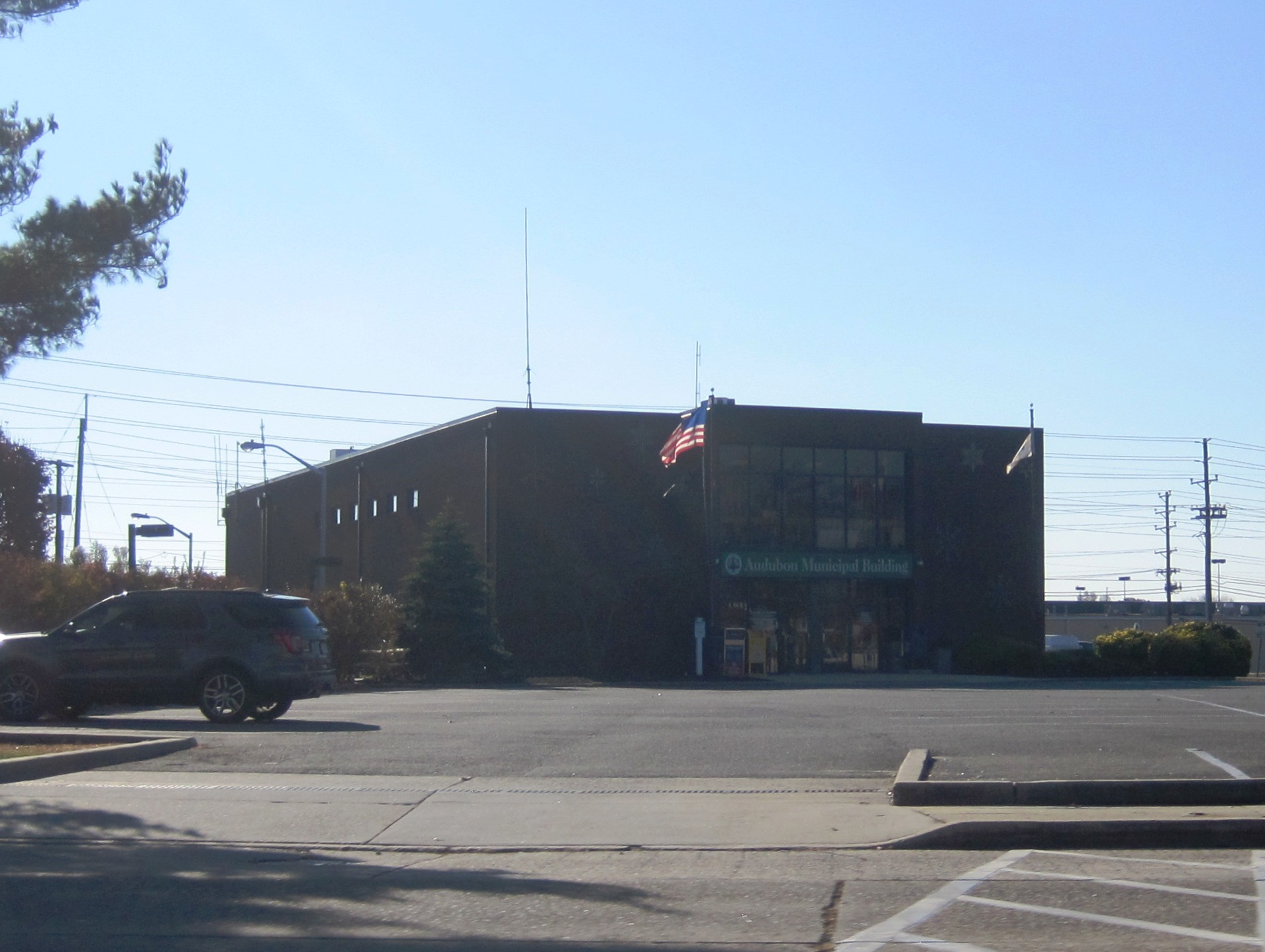
Audubon Municipal Building

Audubon borough operates under the Walsh Act commission form of New Jersey municipal government. The borough is one of 30 municipalities (of the 564) statewide that use this commission form of government. The governing body is comprised of three commissioners who are elected at-large on a non-partisan basis to serve four-year terms of office on a concurrent basis in elections held as part of the May municipal election. Each commissioner is assigned a specific department to head in addition to their legislative functions and the commissioners select one of their members to serve as mayor.

As of 2026, the members of the Board of Commissioners are Mayor Robert Jakubowski (Director of Public Safety & Affairs), Dave Alemi (Director of Revenue & Finance) and Andrea Wendell (Director of Public Works, Parks and Buildings), all of whom are serving concurrent terms of office ending May 1, 2029.

==== Emergency services ====
The Audubon Police Department dates back to 1931, with Police Chief Frank Kelly chosen to lead the borough's first uniformed officers. As of 2024, the department's chief is Thomas J. Tassi.

The Audubon Fire Department is an all-volunteer unit with 50 members, responding to an average of 300 calls each year in Audubon and portions of surrounding communities, including Audubon Park, Haddon Heights, Mount Ephraim and Oaklyn.

=== Federal, state and county representation ===
Audubon is located in the 1st Congressional district and is part of New Jersey's 5th state legislative district.

For the 119th United States Congress, New Jersey's 1st congressional district is represented by Donald Norcross (D, Camden). New Jersey is represented in the United States Senate by Democrats Cory Booker (Newark, term ends 2027) and Andy Kim (Moorestown, term ends 2031).

For the 2026–2027 session, the 5th legislative district of the New Jersey Legislature is represented in the State Senate by Nilsa Cruz-Perez (D, Barrington) and in the General Assembly by Bill Moen (D, Camden) and William Spearman (D, Camden).

Camden County is governed by a Board of County Commissioners composed of seven members chosen at-large in partisan elections for three-year terms on a staggered basis by the residents of the county, with either two or three seats up for election each year as part of the November general election. At a reorganization meeting held in January after each election, the newly constituted Board of Commissioners selects one member to serve as Director and another as Deputy Director, each serving a one-year term in that role. As of 2025, Camden County's Commissioners are: Commissioner Director Louis Cappelli Jr. (D, Collingswood, 2026), Commissioner Deputy Director Edward T. McDonnell (D, Pennsauken Township, 2025), Virginia Ruiz Betteridge (D, Runnemede, 2025), Almar Dyer (D, Pennsauken Township, 2027), Melinda Kane (D, Cherry Hill, 2027), Jeffrey L. Nash (D, Winslow Township, 2027), and Jonathan L. Young Sr. (D, Berlin Township, 2026).

Camden County's constitutional officers are: Clerk Pamela Rosen Lampitt (D, Cherry Hill, 2029) Sheriff Chuck Billingham (D, Gloucester City, 2027) and Surrogate Michelle Gentek-Mayer (D, Gloucester Township, 2025).

=== Politics ===
As of March 2011, there were a total of 6,215 registered voters in Audubon, of which 2,418 (38.9% vs. 31.7% countywide) were registered as Democrats, 1,113 (17.9% vs. 21.1%) were registered as Republicans and 2,676 (43.1% vs. 47.1%) were registered as Unaffiliated. There were 8 voters registered as Libertarians or Greens. Among the borough's 2010 Census population, 70.5% (vs. 57.1% in Camden County) were registered to vote, including 89.4% of those ages 18 and over (vs. 73.7% countywide).

Gubernatorial election results for Audubon
| Year | Republican | | Democratic | | Third party(ies) | |
| Year | No. | % | No. | % | No. | % |
|---|---|---|---|---|---|---|
| 2025 | 1,497 | 34.52% | 2,811 | 64.81% | 29 | 0.67% |
| 2021 | 1,512 | 43.39% | 1,943 | 55.75% | 30 | 0.86% |
| 2017 | 996 | 36.18% | 1,678 | 60.95% | 79 | 2.87% |
| 2013 | 1,545 | 62.05% | 886 | 35.58% | 59 | 2.37% |
| 2009 | 1,256 | 45.51% | 1,275 | 46.20% | 229 | 8.30% |
| 2005 | 1,103 | 39.95% | 1,501 | 54.36% | 157 | 5.69% |

In the 2012 presidential election, Democrat Barack Obama received 2,718 votes (60.0% vs. 54.8% countywide), ahead of Republican Mitt Romney with 1,704 votes (37.6% vs. 43.5%) and other candidates with 70 votes (1.5% vs. 0.9%), among the 4,527 ballots cast by the borough's 6,618 registered voters, for a turnout of 68.4% (vs. 70.4% in Camden County). In the 2008 presidential election, Democrat Barack Obama received 2,806 votes (59.7% vs. 66.2% countywide), ahead of Republican John McCain with 1,778 votes (37.8% vs. 30.7%) and other candidates with 81 votes (1.7% vs. 1.1%), among the 4,701 ballots cast by the borough's 6,423 registered voters, for a turnout of 73.2% (vs. 71.4% in Camden County). In the 2004 presidential election, Democrat John Kerry received 2,696 votes (56.3% vs. 61.7% countywide), ahead of Republican George W. Bush with 2,021 votes (42.2% vs. 36.4%) and other candidates with 40 votes (0.8% vs. 0.8%), among the 4,791 ballots cast by the borough's 6,091 registered voters, for a turnout of 78.7% (vs. 71.3% in the whole county).

United States presidential election results for Audubon
| Year | Republican | | Democratic | | Third party(ies) | |
| Year | No. | % | No. | % | No. | % |
|---|---|---|---|---|---|---|
| 2024 | 2,072 | 39.58% | 3,085 | 58.93% | 78 | 1.49% |
| 2020 | 2,141 | 39.03% | 3,244 | 59.13% | 101 | 1.84% |
| 2016 | 1,865 | 40.75% | 2,600 | 56.81% | 112 | 2.45% |
| 2012 | 1,704 | 37.93% | 2,718 | 60.51% | 70 | 1.56% |
| 2008 | 1,778 | 38.11% | 2,806 | 60.15% | 81 | 1.74% |
| 2004 | 2,021 | 42.48% | 2,696 | 56.67% | 40 | 0.84% |

In the 2013 gubernatorial election, Republican Chris Christie received 62.0% of the vote (1,545 cast), ahead of Democrat Barbara Buono with 35.6% (886 votes), and other candidates with 2.4% (59 votes), among the 2,560 ballots cast by the borough's 6,650 registered voters (70 ballots were spoiled), for a turnout of 38.5%. In the 2009 gubernatorial election, Democrat Jon Corzine received 1,275 ballots cast (45.8% vs. 53.8% countywide), ahead of Republican Chris Christie with 1,256 votes (45.1% vs. 38.5%), Independent Chris Daggett with 182 votes (6.5% vs. 4.5%) and other candidates with 47 votes (1.7% vs. 1.1%), among the 2,782 ballots cast by the borough's 6,221 registered voters, yielding a 44.7% turnout (vs. 40.8% in the county).

United States Senate election results for Audubon1
| Year | Republican | | Democratic | | Third party(ies) | |
| Year | No. | % | No. | % | No. | % |
|---|---|---|---|---|---|---|
| 2024 | 1,913 | 37.53% | 3,124 | 61.29% | 60 | 1.18% |
| 2018 | 1,596 | 41.69% | 1,999 | 52.22% | 233 | 6.09% |
| 2012 | 1,578 | 36.86% | 2,603 | 60.80% | 100 | 2.34% |
| 2006 | 1,220 | 42.46% | 1,583 | 55.10% | 70 | 2.44% |

United States Senate election results for Audubon2
| Year | Republican | | Democratic | | Third party(ies) | |
| Year | No. | % | No. | % | No. | % |
|---|---|---|---|---|---|---|
| 2020 | 2,122 | 39.41% | 3,211 | 59.63% | 52 | 0.97% |
| 2014 | 918 | 41.20% | 1,259 | 56.51% | 51 | 2.29% |
| 2013 | 638 | 43.55% | 805 | 54.95% | 22 | 1.50% |
| 2008 | 1,699 | 39.37% | 2,542 | 58.90% | 75 | 1.74% |

== Education ==
The Audubon School District serves public school students in pre-kindergarten through twelfth grade. As of the 2023–24 school year, the district, comprised of four schools, had an enrollment of 1,366 students and 135.4 classroom teachers (on an FTE basis), for a student–teacher ratio of 10.1:1. Schools in the district (with 2023–24 enrollment data from the National Center for Education Statistics) are Audubon Preschool with 56 students in PreK, Haviland Avenue School with 238 students in grades K–2, Mansion Avenue School with 323 students in grades 3–6 and Audubon High School with 727 students in grades 7–12.

Students from Audubon Park attend the district's schools as part of a sending/receiving relationship established after Audubon Park closed its lone school in 1979. For grades 9–12, students from Mount Ephraim attend Audubon High School, as part of a sending/receiving relationship with the Mount Ephraim Public Schools.

The two schools in Audubon, Haviland Avenue School and Mansion Avenue School had both served Kindergarten to sixth grade. This continued until the 2009–2010 school year when they were reconfigured so that Haviland is K–2 and Mansion serves grades 3–6.

Students from Audubon, and from all of Camden County, are eligible to attend the Camden County Technical Schools, a countywide public school district that serves the vocational and technical education needs of students at the high school and post-secondary level at Gloucester Township Technical High School in Gloucester Township or Pennsauken Technical High School in Pennsauken Township.

== Transportation ==
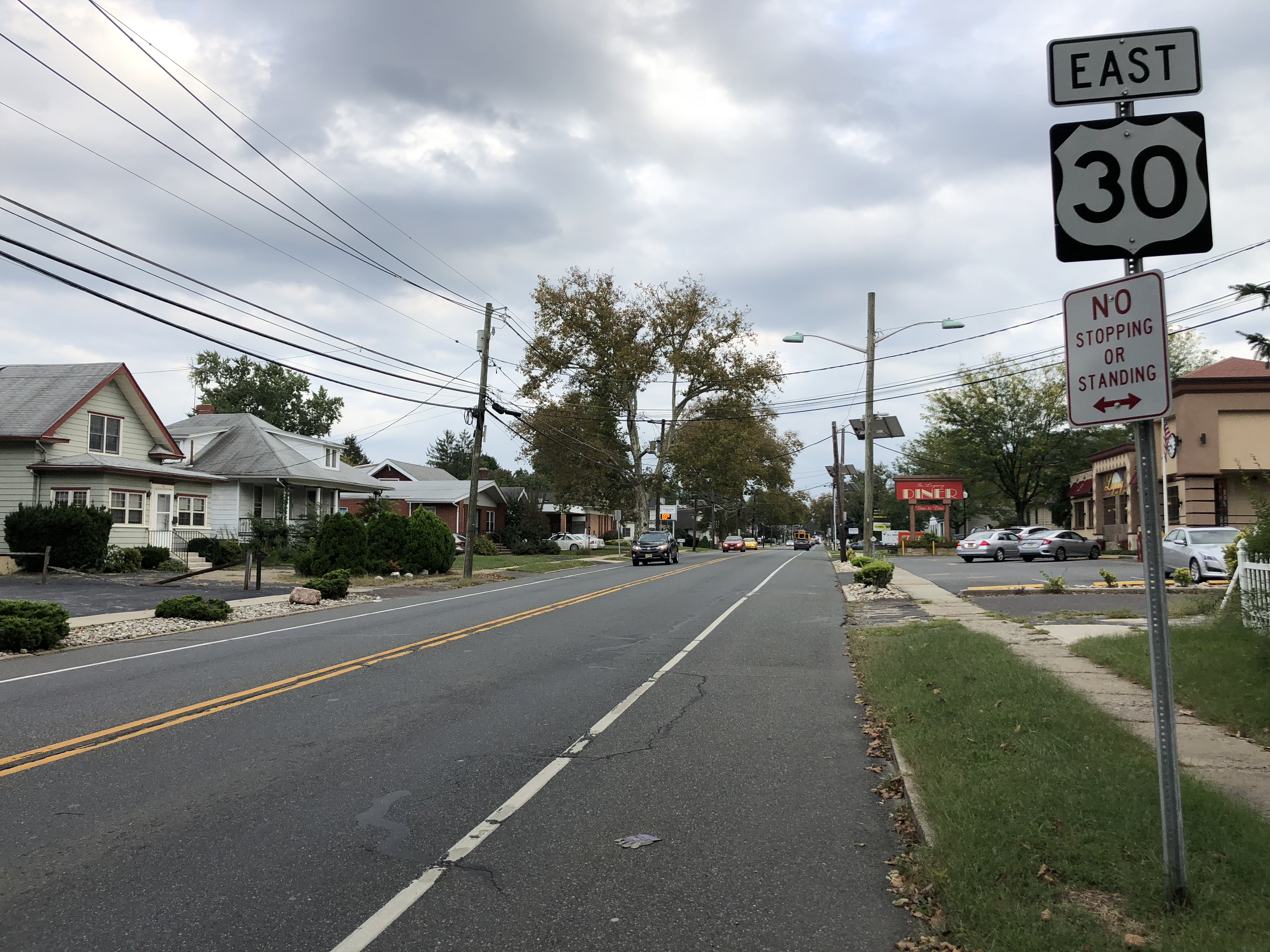
U.S. Route 30 eastbound in Audubon

=== Roads and highways ===
As of May 2010, the borough had a total of 29.80 miles (47.96 km) of roadways, of which 22.16 miles (35.66 km) were maintained by the municipality, 6.44 miles (10.36 km) by Camden County and 1.20 miles (1.93 km) by the New Jersey Department of Transportation.

U.S. Route 30 (White Horse Pike) traverses for 0.9 miles (1.4 km) across the borough, connecting Oaklyn and Haddon Heights. Route 168 (Black Horse Pike) runs for 0.4 miles (0.64 km) from Mount Ephraim to Audubon Park, along the borough's border with Haddon Township.

=== Public transportation ===
NJ Transit bus service is available in the borough on routes 400 (between Sicklerville and Philadelphia), 403 (between Turnersville and Camden), 450 (between the Cherry Hill Mall and Camden), and 457 (between the Moorestown Mall and Camden).

== Notable people ==
People who were born in, residents of, or otherwise closely associated with Audubon include:

- Edward Clyde Benfold (1931–1952), a United States Navy sailor who was posthumously awarded the Medal of Honor for his actions during the Korean War
- Nelson V. Brittin (1920–1951), Korean War veteran who was awarded the Medal of Honor posthumously
- Mario Cerrito (born 1984), filmmaker, writer and producer known in the horror/thriller genre
- Joe Flacco (born 1985), NFL quarterback for the Cincinnati Bengals
- Bill Laxton (born 1948), former MLB pitcher who played in all or part of five seasons in the majors between 1970 and 1977
- Brett Laxton (born 1973), former MLB pitcher who played in parts of two seasons for the Oakland Athletics and the Kansas City Royals
- Edward Longacre (born 1946), historian and writer
- Vic Obeck (1917–1979), football coach and executive
- Merl Reagle (1950–2015), nationally syndicated crossword puzzle constructor
- Samuel M. Sampler (1895–1979), a World War I veteran who was awarded the Medal of Honor
- William Siri (1919–2004), a co-leader of the first American expedition to successfully climb Mount Everest who served as President of the Sierra Club (1964–1966)
- Anne McConaghie Volp (1921–2010), field hockey player and coach, who was a member of the United States women's national field hockey team for 14 years and the team captain for five of those years
- John L. White (1930–2001), politician who served in the New Jersey General Assembly and New Jersey Senate
