= Olympic Conference (New Jersey) =

The Olympic Conference is an athletic conference consisting of public and private high schools located in Burlington County and Camden County, New Jersey. The Olympic Conference operates under the aegis of the New Jersey State Interscholastic Athletic Association. All schools that sponsor a football program are members of the West Jersey Football League.

== History ==
Timber Creek Regional High School announced in 2018 that they would leave the Olympic Conference and join the Tri-County Conference for the 2020-21 school year, which would have the benefit of having all three schools in the Black Horse Pike District competing in the same athletic conference.

Both Washington Township High School and the Salem County Career and Technical High School announced in 2021 that they would leave the Olympic Conference for the Tri-County Conference.

== Participating schools ==
School	Location	School district	Team name	Classification
Bishop Eustace Preparatory School	Pennsauken Township	Roman Catholic Diocese of Camden	Crusaders	Non-Public Parochial A
Camden High School	Camden	Camden City School District	Golden Panthers	Public Group II
Camden Catholic High School	Cherry Hill	Roman Catholic Diocese of Camden	Fighting Irish	Non-Public Parochial A
Cherokee High School	Evesham Township	Lenape Regional High School District	Chiefs	Public Group IV
Cherry Hill High School East	Cherry Hill	Cherry Hill Public Schools	Cougars	Public Group IV
Cherry Hill High School West	Cherry Hill	Cherry Hill Public Schools	Lions	Public Group IV
Eastern High School	Voorhees Township	Eastern Camden County Regional High School District	Vikings	Public Group IV
Gloucester Township Technical High School	Winslow Township	Camden County Technical Schools	Warriors	Public Group III
Lenape High School	Medford	Lenape Regional High School District	Indians	Public Group IV
Moorestown High School	Moorestown	Moorestown Township Public Schools	Quakers	Public Group III
Pennsauken Technical High School	Pennsauken Township	Camden County Technical Schools	Tornadoes	Public Group II
Seneca High School	Tabernacle Township	Lenape Regional High School District	Golden Eagles	Public Group III
Shawnee High School	Medford	Lenape Regional High School District	Renegades	Public Group IV
Woodrow Wilson High School	Camden	Camden City School District	Mighty Tigers	Public Group III
Winslow Township High School	Winslow Township	Winslow Township School District	Eagles	Public Group III
