= Dan Baker (announcer) =

American public address announcer

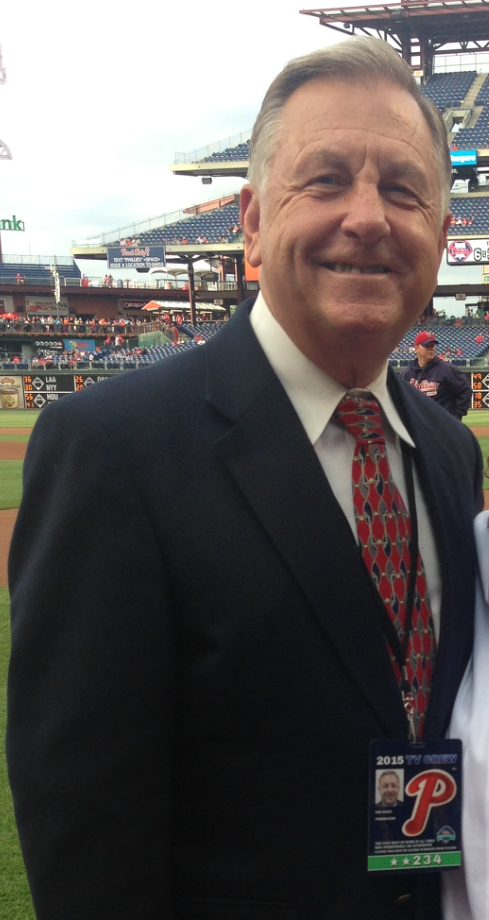
- Born: September 22, 1946 (age 80); Philadelphia, Pennsylvania, U.S.
- Years active: 1972–present
- Sports commentary career
- Teams: Philadelphia Phillies; Philadelphia Eagles
- Genre: Public address announcer
- Sports: Baseball; Basketball; Football

Dan Baker (born September 22, 1946) is an American public address announcer best known for many years as the voice of Veterans Stadium, Lincoln Financial Field, and Citizens Bank Park in Philadelphia.

== Early life ==
Born in Philadelphia, Pennsylvania, Baker grew up in suburban Mount Ephraim, New Jersey, and graduated from Audubon High School. He earned his undergraduate degree at Glassboro State College (since renamed as Rowan University) and went on to earn a master's degree at Temple University.

== Career ==
Baker has been the public address announcer for the Philadelphia Phillies since 1972 and was the public address announcer for the Philadelphia Eagles from 1985 to 2014. He has served as a PA voice for six World Series (1980, 1983, 1993, 2008, 2009, and 2022), three Major League Baseball All Star Games (1976, 1996, and 2026) and three NFC Championship Games (2002, 2003, and 2004).

Although the Phillies and Eagles left Veterans Stadium for new venues (the Eagles to Lincoln Financial Field in 2003 and the Phillies to Citizens Bank Park in 2004), Baker remained the PA announcer for both teams. He also serves as PA announcer for the Army–Navy Game when it is played in Philadelphia as well as Drexel University Dragons men's basketball. After the 2009 retirement of the New York Yankees' Bob Sheppard, Baker became the longest-tenured PA announcer in Major League Baseball.

Between Baker and former Chicago Cubs' public address announcer Pat Pieper, the 2019 MLB season marked 103 consecutive seasons that one of them has been announcing games. Pieper from 1916 to 1974 and Baker from 1972–present. Prior to the 2020 season, the last game that was played without Pieper or Baker announcing games was the 1915 World Series on October 13, 1915.

Baker was the radio announcer for Drexel University Dragons men's basketball on WNTP 990 AM from 1997 to 2012, after which he retired and became the team's public address announcer. Before that, he broadcast Philadelphia BIG 5 Basketball games for 21 years while additionally serving as its executive director from 1981 to 1996. Baker was named to the Big 5 Hall of Fame in 1997 and was inducted into the Philadelphia Sports Hall of Fame in 2012.

Baker co-hosts a radio show on WBCB (AM) 1490 called "Bull Session" with former Philadelphia Phillies slugger Greg Luzinski, for whom the show is named. The show airs at 6:00 pm on Monday nights, and each week they bring in a special guest, usually a current or retired player.

Baker reprises his role as the Philadelphia Phillies PA announcer for select Phillies away games at multiple venues that comprise a chain of Philadelphia area sports bars. The events are billed as "Summer Nights with Dan Baker". At these appearances, Baker announces the game over the sports bar's PA system in exactly the same fashion as he would if he was announcing an actual Phillies home game.

On May 7, 2014, the Eagles announced that Baker would no longer serve as their public address announcer, citing that they decided to make a change in the role. Baker continued as the public address announcer for the Phillies.

On September 16, 2015, XFINITY Live! announced that Baker would be the in-house public address announcer for Philadelphia Eagles games. Baker's duties are similar to those he had as the public address announcer for the Eagles, which include energizing the crowd with his signature calls.

Baker did not announce during the 2020 season after being diagnosed with sinus cancer. However, after treatment including radiation therapy and surgery to replace his right cheekbone, he returned the following year.

In 2022, Baker celebrated his 50th year as PA announcer for the Phillies.
