= Audubon School District =

School district in Camden County, New Jersey, US

Audubon Public School District

Address
- 350 Edgewood Avenue Audubon, Camden County, New Jersey, 08106; United States
- Coordinates: 39.885064°N 75.076064°W

District information
- Grades: PreK-12
- Superintendent: Sandra Allen
- Business administrator: Deborah Roncace
- Schools: 4

Students and staff
- Enrollment: 1,366 (as of 2023–24)
- Faculty: 135.4 FTEs
- Student–teacher ratio: 10.1:1

Other information
- District Factor Group: DE
- Website: www.audubonschools.org
Ind.	Per pupil	District spending	Rank (*)	K-12 average	%± vs. average
1A	Total Spending	$17,576	23	$18,891	−7.0%
1	Budgetary Cost	13,043	13	14,783	−11.8%
2	Classroom Instruction	7,495	14	8,763	−14.5%
6	Support Services	1,929	22	2,392	−19.4%
8	Administrative Cost	1,549	17	1,485	4.3%
10	Operations & Maintenance	1,405	12	1,783	−21.2%
13	Extracurricular Activities	596	39	268	122.4%
16	Median Teacher Salary	59,800	24	64,043
Data from NJDoE 2014 Taxpayers' Guide to Education Spending. *Of K-12 districts with up to 1,800 students. Lowest spending=1; Highest=49

The Audubon Public School District is a comprehensive community public school district that serves students in pre-kindergarten through twelfth grade from Audubon, in Camden County, in the southern portion of the U.S. state of New Jersey.

As of the 2023–24 school year, the district, comprised of four schools, had an enrollment of 1,366 students and 135.4 classroom teachers (on an FTE basis), for a student–teacher ratio of 10.1:1.

The district participates in the Interdistrict Public School Choice Program, which allows non-resident students to attend the district's school without cost to their parents, with tuition covered by the State of New Jersey. Available slots are announced annually by grade.

Students from Audubon Park attend the district's schools as part of a sending/receiving relationship established after Audubon Park closed its lone school in 1979. For grades 9–12, students from Mount Ephraim attend Audubon High School, as part of a sending/receiving relationship with the Mount Ephraim Public Schools.

== History ==
The two elementary schools in Audubon, Haviland Avenue School and Mansion Avenue School, had both served Kindergarten to sixth grade. This continued until the 2009-2010 school year when they were reconfigured so that Haviland is PreK-2 and Mansion was reconfigured to serve grades 3–6.

The district had been classified by the New Jersey Department of Education as being in District Factor Group "DE", the fifth-highest of eight groupings. District Factor Groups organize districts statewide to allow comparison by common socioeconomic characteristics of the local districts. From lowest socioeconomic status to highest, the categories are A, B, CD, DE, FG, GH, I and J.

== Schools ==
Schools in the district (with 2023–24 enrollment data from the National Center for Education Statistics) are:

Preschool

- Audubon Preschool with 56 students in PreK
  - Barbra Ledyard, principal

Elementary schools

- Haviland Avenue School with 238 students in grades K–2
  - Barbra Ledyard, principal
- Mansion Avenue School with 323 students in grades 3–6
  - Bonnie Smeltzer, principal

High school

- Audubon High School with 727 students in grades 7–12
  - Jeffrey Lebb, principal

== Administration ==
Core members of the district's administration are:

- Sandra Allen, superintendent of schools
- Deborah J. Roncace, business administrator and board secretary

== Board of education ==
The district's board of education is comprised of nine members who set policy and oversee the fiscal and educational operation of the district through its administration. As a Type II school district, the board's trustees are elected directly by voters to serve three-year terms of office on a staggered basis, with three seats up for election each year held (since 2012) as part of the November general election. The board appoints a superintendent to oversee the district's day-to-day operations and a business administrator to supervise the business functions of the district.
