= John L. White =

American politician (1930-2001)

Member of the New Jersey Senate from District 3A
- In office January 9, 1968 – January 11, 1972
- Preceded by: District created
- Succeeded by: James M. Turner

Member of the New Jersey General Assembly from Gloucester County
- In office January 14, 1964 – January 9, 1968
- Preceded by: Joseph Minotty
- Succeeded by: District abolished

Personal details
- Born: John Lindsey White; April 1, 1930 Camden, U.S.
- Died: October 9, 2001 (aged 71) Deptford Township, U.S.
- Party: Republican
- Education: Franklin & Marshall College

John Lindsey "Jack" White (April 1, 1930 – October 9, 2001) was an American Republican Party politician who served in both the New Jersey General Assembly and the New Jersey Senate.

== Early life ==
White was born April 1, 1930, in Camden, the son of John Rice White (1900-1980) and Jean Black Lord White (1903-1995). He grew up in Audubon, New Jersey and graduated from Audubon High School in 1948. He was a 1952 graduate of Franklin & Marshall College and a 1955 graduate of Temple University Law School. He moved to Woodbury, New Jersey after law school. He served as the Assistant Gloucester County Solicitor.

== New Jersey State Assemblyman ==
White was elected to the New Jersey General Assembly from the Gloucester County district in 1963 after Republican Assemblyman Joseph Minotty declined to seek re-election. He defeated Democrat William G. Foster by 5,244 votes, 27,922 (55.18%) to 22,678 (44.82%). He was re-elected in 1965, defeating Democrat Francis J. Spellman, a former Philadelphia Inquirer and Gloucester County Times newspaper reporter, by 4,534 votes, 27,404 (54.51%) to 22,870 (45.49%).

== New Jersey State Senator ==
White became a candidate for the State Senate in 1967, an election cycle that was less favorable toward Democrats (it was the mid-term election of the second term of Democratic Governor Richard J. Hughes). He challenged four-term incumbent Senate Majority Leader John A. Waddington in the Third Senate District, specifically within Assembly district 3A, which included all of Salem County and part of Gloucester County. He defeated Waddington by 4,830 votes, 28,456 (54.6%) to 23,635 (45.4%). Waddington won Salem County by 3,328 votes, but White's margin in the Gloucester County part of the district was 8,149. He did not seek re-election to a second term in 1971.

== Post-legislative career ==
After leaving the Senate, White continued to practice law in Woodbury. He served as president of the New Jersey State Bar Association in 1985. He served as Solicitor of the Woodbury Public Schools and the Gloucester County Improvement Authority. White retired in 1996 after suffering a stroke, and died in Deptford Township, New Jersey in 2001. He was 71.
