= MV Nelson V. Brittin =

Cargo ship of the United States Navy

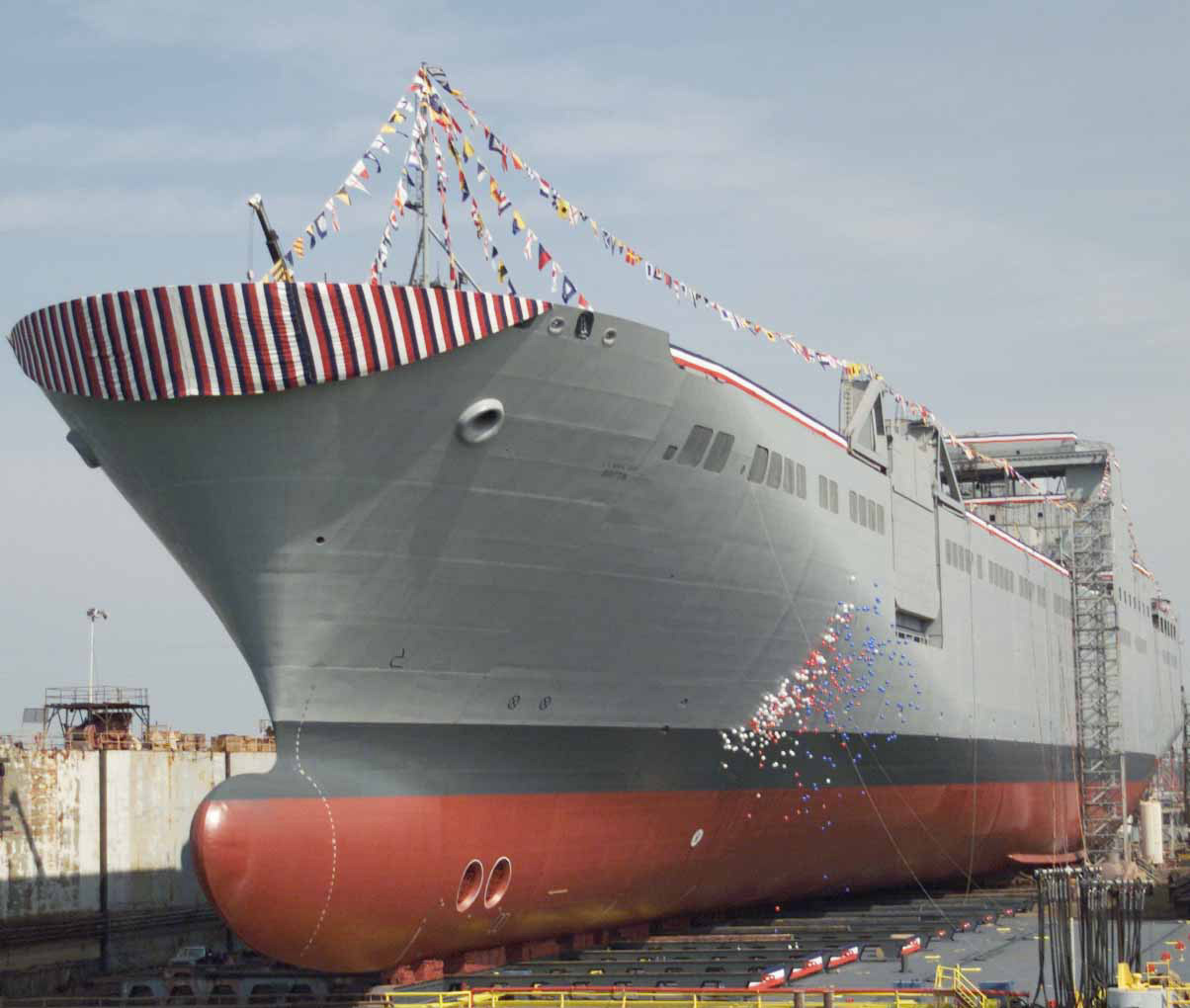

History

United States
- Name: Brittin
- Operator: Military Sealift Command
- Builder: Northrop Grumman Ship Systems, New Orleans
- Laid down: 3 May 1999
- Launched: 11 November 2000
- In service: 11 July 2002
- Stricken: 12 April 2023
- Identification: IMO number: 9193575; MMSI number: 303890000; Callsign: NBJV
- Status: Stricken, in Ready Reserve Force

General characteristics
- Class & type: Bob Hope-class roll on roll off vehicle cargo ship
- Displacement: 35,500 t.(lt); 62,096 t.(fl)
- Length: 951 ft 5 in (290.0 m)
- Beam: 106 ft (32.3 m)
- Draft: 34 ft 10 in (10.6 m) maximum
- Propulsion: 4 × Colt Pielstick 10 PC4.2 V diesels; 65,160 hp(m) (47.89 MW); 2 shafts; cp props
- Speed: 24 knots (44 km/h)
- Capacity: 300,000 sq ft (28,000 m^{2}); 49,991 sq ft (4,644.3 m^{2}) deck cargo
- Complement: 26 reduced / up to 45 full, civilian mariners; 50 US Navy personnel

MV Nelson V. Brittin, formerly USNS Brittin (T-AKR-305), is a Bob Hope-class roll-on/roll-off vehicle cargo ship of the United States Navy. She was built by Northrop Grumman Ship Systems, New Orleans and delivered to the Navy on July 11, 2002. They assigned her to the United States Department of Defense's Military Sealift Command. Brittin is named for Medal of Honor recipient Sergeant First Class Nelson V. Brittin, and is one of 11 Surge LMSRs operated by a private company under contract to the Military Sealift Command. She is assigned to the MSC Atlantic surge force and is maintained in Ready Operational Status 4.

On April 12, 2023, Brittin was stricken from the Naval Vessel Register.

As of April 30, 2024 she is moored in Portland, OR.
