= Mount Ephraim, New Jersey =

Borough in Camden County, New Jersey, US

- Borough
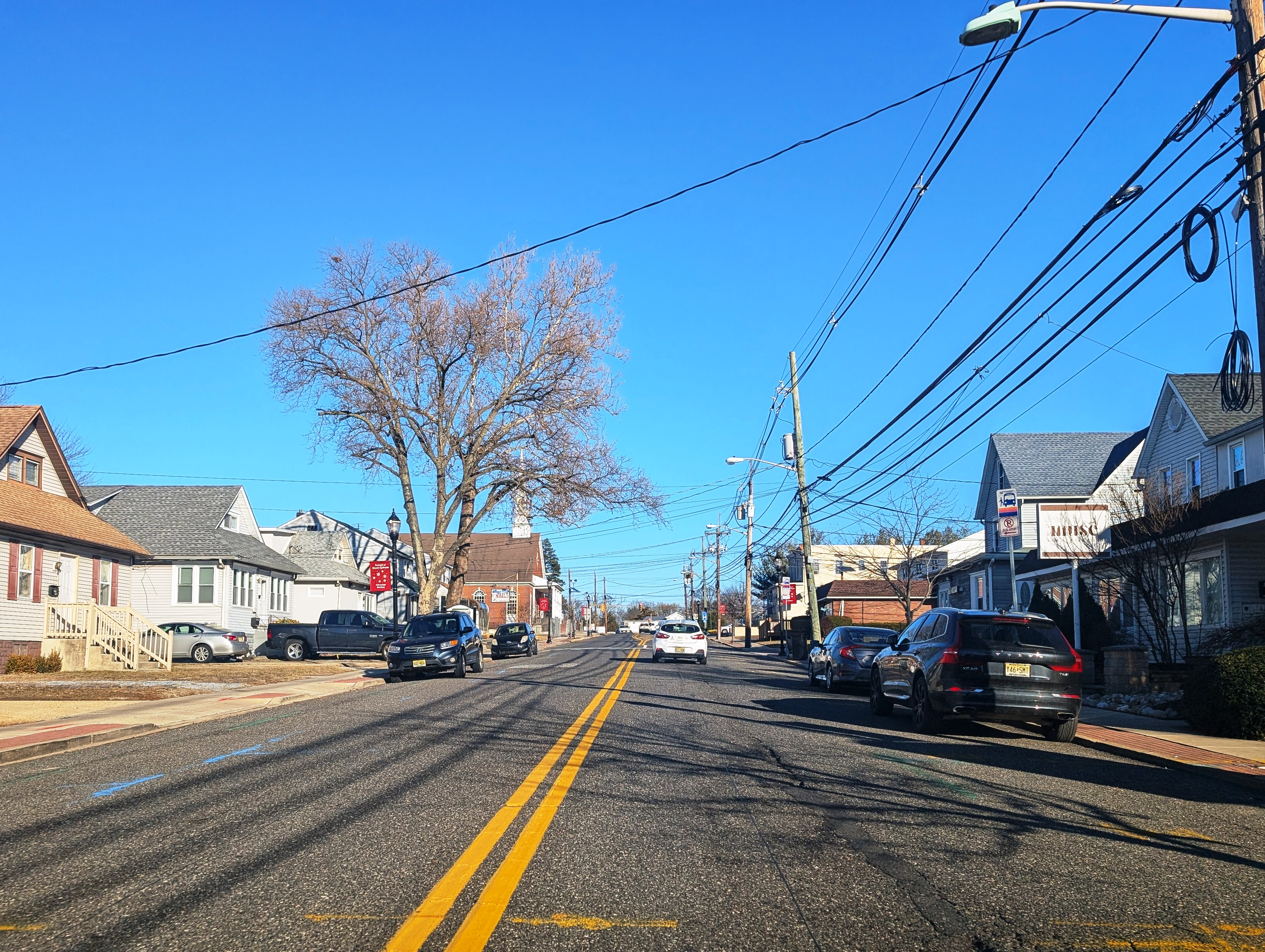
- Northbound CR 551 Spur in Mount Ephraim

- Seal
- Motto: "The Village at the Crossroads"
- Mount Ephraim highlighted in Camden County. Inset: Camden County highlighted in the State of New Jersey.

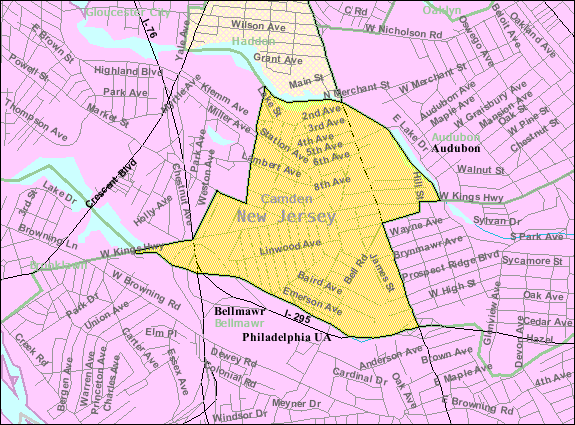
- Census Bureau map of Mount Ephraim, New Jersey

- Location in Camden County Location in New Jersey Location in the United States
- Coordinates: 39.879524°N 75.091814°W
- Country: United States
- State: New Jersey
- County: Camden
- Incorporated: March 23, 1926
- Named for: Ephraim Albertson

Government
  - Type: Walsh Act
  - Body: Board of Commissioners
  - Mayor: Susan Carney (term ends December 31, 2028)
  - Municipal clerk: Terry Shannon

Area
  - Total: 0.90 sq mi (2.34 km^{2})
  - Land: 0.88 sq mi (2.29 km^{2})
  - Water: 0.019 sq mi (0.05 km^{2}) 2.31%
  - Rank: 514th of 565 in state 29th of 37 in county
- Elevation: 30 ft (9.1 m)

Population (2020)
  - Total: 4,651
  - Estimate (2023): 4,654
  - Rank: 390th of 565 in state 24th of 37 in county
  - Density: 5,261.3/sq mi (2,031.4/km^{2})
  - Rank: 107th of 565 in state 10th of 37 in county
- Time zone: UTC−05:00 (Eastern (EST))
  - Summer (DST): UTC−04:00 (Eastern (EDT))
- ZIP Code: 08059
- Area code: 856 exchanges: 456, 742, 931, 933
- FIPS code: 3400748750
- GNIS feature ID: 0885313
- Website: www.mountephraim-nj.com

Mount Ephraim (pronounced "EEF-rum") is a borough in Camden County, in the U.S. state of New Jersey. As of the 2020 United States census, the borough's population was 4,651, a decrease of 25 (−0.5%) from the 2010 census count of 4,676, which in turn reflected an increase of 181 (+4.0%) from the 4,495 counted in the 2000 census.

The borough had the 20th-highest property tax rate in New Jersey with an equalized rate of 4.442% in 2020, compared to 3.470% in the county as a whole and a statewide average of 2.279%.

== History ==
Mount Ephraim was authorized to incorporate as a borough by an act of the New Jersey Legislature on March 23, 1926, from portions of the now-defunct Centre Township, and then incorporated following a referendum on April 28, 1926, being the last borough to dissolve the former township. Acts authorizing the creation of the boroughs of Bellmawr, Runnemede and Lawnside were also passed during the same two-day period. The borough was named for Ephraim Albertson, who owned a tavern in the area in the early 1800s.

In a 1981 decision in Schad v. Mount Ephraim, the U.S. Supreme Court, in a decision authored for the majority by Associate Justice Byron White, the court decided by a 7–2 margin to overturn the convictions of the two owners of a bookstore where there was nude dancing, despite a prohibition against all forms of live entertainment in the borough's zoning ordinance. The decision cited the First Amendment rights of the storeowners.

In January 2014, New Jersey State Senate President Stephen M. Sweeney put forward a proposal which was intended to lower real estate taxes in the state and cut state expenses by merging many of the states 566 municipalities. Mount Ephraim was then the 29th largest town in Camden County, so it is very likely that the town would have been merged with neighboring municipalities to cut costs, share expenses, reduce bureaucracy, share resources, and reduce the burden in the taxpayers and the state itself. Mount Ephraim was formerly part of Centre Township, which included all of the neighboring communities, and it is possible that the name may be used again in the future if the merger proposal goes forward.

== Geography ==
According to the U.S. Census Bureau, the borough had a total area of 0.91 square miles (2.34 km^{2}), including 0.88 square miles (2.29 km^{2}) of land and 0.02 square miles (0.05 km^{2}) of water (2.31%).

Mount Ephraim borders Audubon, Bellmawr, Brooklawn, Gloucester City and Haddon Heights.

=== Weather ===
On September 4, 2012, at 6:31 p.m., a tornado touched down in Mount Ephraim, causing damage to trees and homes in the immediate vicinity. It was categorized as F-0 by the National Weather Service, with winds topping out at 70 mph, making it the first tornado recorded in the state in more than a year.

== Demographics ==
Historical population
Census	Pop.	Note	%±
1930	2,319		—
1940	2,282		−1.6%
1950	4,449		95.0%
1960	5,447		22.4%
1970	5,625		3.3%
1980	4,863		−13.5%
1990	4,517		−7.1%
2000	4,495		−0.5%
2010	4,676		4.0%
2020	4,651		−0.5%
2023 (est.)	4,654	▲	0.1%
Population sources: 1930–2000 1930; 1940–2000 2000; 2010 2020

=== 2020 census ===
As of the 2020 census, Mount Ephraim had a population of 4,651. The median age was 41.1 years. 18.6% of residents were under the age of 18 and 17.4% of residents were 65 years of age or older. For every 100 females there were 96.4 males, and for every 100 females age 18 and over there were 94.0 males age 18 and over.

100.0% of residents lived in urban areas, while 0.0% lived in rural areas.

There were 1,941 households in Mount Ephraim, of which 25.0% had children under the age of 18 living in them. Of all households, 43.3% were married-couple households, 19.8% were households with a male householder and no spouse or partner present, and 28.9% were households with a female householder and no spouse or partner present. About 30.5% of all households were made up of individuals and 14.5% had someone living alone who was 65 years of age or older.

There were 2,015 housing units, of which 3.7% were vacant. The homeowner vacancy rate was 1.5% and the rental vacancy rate was 6.4%.

Racial composition as of the 2020 census
Race	Number	Percent
White	4,036	86.8%
Black or African American	143	3.1%
American Indian and Alaska Native	6	0.1%
Asian	50	1.1%
Native Hawaiian and Other Pacific Islander	0	0.0%
Some other race	130	2.8%
Two or more races	286	6.1%
Hispanic or Latino (of any race)	319	6.9%

=== 2010 census ===
The 2010 United States census counted 4,676 people, 1,909 households, and 1,193 families in the borough. The population density was 5,307.9 per square mile (2,049.4/km^{2}). There were 2,010 housing units at an average density of 2,281.6 per square mile (880.9/km^{2}). The racial makeup was 93.56% (4,375) White, 2.14% (100) Black or African American, 0.09% (4) Native American, 0.68% (32) Asian, 0.00% (0) Pacific Islander, 2.27% (106) from other races, and 1.26% (59) from two or more races. Hispanic or Latino of any race were 5.33% (249) of the population.

Of the 1,909 households, 26.6% had children under the age of 18; 45.6% were married couples living together; 11.5% had a female householder with no husband present and 37.5% were non-families. Of all households, 31.2% were made up of individuals and 13.7% had someone living alone who was 65 years of age or older. The average household size was 2.45 and the average family size was 3.11.

20.6% of the population were under the age of 18, 9.1% from 18 to 24, 26.5% from 25 to 44, 29.8% from 45 to 64, and 14.0% who were 65 years of age or older. The median age was 40.1 years. For every 100 females, the population had 93.4 males. For every 100 females ages 18 and older there were 92.4 males.

The Census Bureau's 2006–2010 American Community Survey showed that (in 2010 inflation-adjusted dollars) median household income was $61,331 (with a margin of error of +/− $6,103) and the median family income was $73,955 (+/− $4,630). Males had a median income of $51,049 (+/− $3,914) versus $41,087 (+/− $3,242) for females. The per capita income for the borough was $29,885 (+/− $5,190). About 5.6% of families and 6.8% of the population were below the poverty line, including 9.9% of those under age 18 and 10.4% of those age 65 or over.

=== 2000 census ===
As of the 2000 United States census, there were 4,495 people and 1,174 families residing in the borough. The population density was 5,100.1 inhabitants per square mile (1,969.2/km^{2}). There were 1,881 housing units at an average density of 2,134.2 per square mile (824.0/km^{2}). The racial makeup of the borough was 97.51% White, 0.40% African American, 0.07% Native American, 0.62% Asian, 0.02% Pacific Islander, 0.65% from other races, and 0.73% from two or more races. Hispanic or Latino of any race were 1.98% of the population.

There were 1,818 households, out of which 27.6% had children under the age of 18 living with them, 51.1% were married couples living together, 8.7% had a female householder with no husband present, and 35.4% were non-families. 30.6% of all households were made up of individuals, and 15.5% had someone living alone who was 65 years of age or older. The average household size was 2.46 and the average family size was 3.13.

In the borough, the population was spread out, with 22.3% under the age of 18, 7.1% from 18 to 24, 30.1% from 25 to 44, 22.5% from 45 to 64, and 17.9% who were 65 years of age or older. The median age was 40 years. For every 100 females, there were 93.6 males. For every 100 females age 18 and over, there were 93.3 males.

The median income for a household in the borough was $44,824, and the median income for a family was $59,468. Males had a median income of $41,455 versus $30,359 for females. The per capita income for the borough was $21,150. About 2.0% of families and 4.9% of the population were below the poverty line, including 1.7% of those under age 18 and 7.2% of those age 65 or over.

== Government ==
=== Local government ===
Mount Ephraim has been governed under the Walsh Act by a three-member commission, since 1935. The borough is one of 30 municipalities (of the 564) statewide that use this form of government. The governing body is comprised of three commissioners, who are elected at-large on a non-partisan basis in elections held as part of the November municipal election to serve concurrent terms of office. Each commissioner is assigned a department to oversee as part of their elected service and a mayor is selected by the commissioners from the three candidates elected. In January 2023, the commissioners voted to shift municipal elections from May to the November general election, citing the savings achieved as the cost of November elections are covered by the county while May elections are conducted at the expense of the municipality. Term-end dates for those commissioners serving when the ordinance was adopted were extended to December 2023.

As of 2024, Mount Ephraim's commissioners are Mayor Susan Carney (Commissioner of Public Affairs and Public Safety), Michael Marrone (Commissioner of Public Works, Parks and Public Property) Joseph Wolk (Commissioner of Revenue and Finance), all of whom are serving concurrent terms of office that end December 31, 2028.

=== Federal, state and county representation ===
Mount Ephraim is located in the 1st Congressional District and is part of New Jersey's 5th state legislative district.

For the 119th United States Congress, New Jersey's 1st congressional district is represented by Donald Norcross (D, Camden). New Jersey is represented in the United States Senate by Democrats Cory Booker (Newark, term ends 2027) and Andy Kim (Moorestown, term ends 2031).

For the 2026–2027 session, the 5th legislative district of the New Jersey Legislature is represented in the State Senate by Nilsa Cruz-Perez (D, Barrington) and in the General Assembly by Bill Moen (D, Camden) and William Spearman (D, Camden).

Camden County is governed by a Board of County Commissioners composed of seven members chosen at-large in partisan elections for three-year terms on a staggered basis by the residents of the county, with either two or three seats up for election each year as part of the November general election. At a reorganization meeting held in January after each election, the newly constituted Board of Commissioners selects one member to serve as Director and another as Deputy Director, each serving a one-year term in that role. As of 2025, Camden County's Commissioners are: Commissioner Director Louis Cappelli Jr. (D, Collingswood, 2026), Commissioner Deputy Director Edward T. McDonnell (D, Pennsauken Township, 2025), Virginia Ruiz Betteridge (D, Runnemede, 2025), Almar Dyer (D, Pennsauken Township, 2027), Melinda Kane (D, Cherry Hill, 2027), Jeffrey L. Nash (D, Winslow Township, 2027), and Jonathan L. Young Sr. (D, Berlin Township, 2026).

Camden County's constitutional officers are: Clerk Pamela Rosen Lampitt (D, Cherry Hill, 2029) Sheriff Chuck Billingham (D, Gloucester City, 2027) and Surrogate Michelle Gentek-Mayer (D, Gloucester Township, 2025).

=== Politics ===
As of March 2011, there were a total of 3,110 registered voters in Mount Ephraim, of which 1,402 (45.1%) were registered as Democrats, 403 (13.0%) were registered as Republicans and 1,305 (42.0%) were registered as Unaffiliated. There were no voters registered to other parties.

Gubernatorial election results for Mount Ephraim
Year	Republican		Democratic		Third party(ies)	
Year	No.	%	No.	%	No.	%
2025	854	41.94%	1,174	57.66%	8	0.39%
2021	806	50.63%	776	48.74%	10	0.63%
2017	458	39.62%	662	57.27%	36	3.11%
2013	753	62.85%	430	35.89%	15	1.25%
2009	560	42.68%	621	47.33%	131	9.98%
2005	457	34.54%	792	59.86%	74	5.59%

In the 2012 presidential election, Democrat Barack Obama received 60.7% of the vote (1,278 cast), ahead of Republican Mitt Romney with 37.7% (793 votes), and other candidates with 1.7% (35 votes), among the 2,131 ballots cast by the borough's 3,320 registered voters (25 ballots were spoiled), for a turnout of 64.2%. In the 2008 presidential election, Democrat Barack Obama received 58.6% of the vote (1,334 cast), ahead of Republican John McCain, who received around 37.6% (855 votes), with 2,275 ballots cast among the borough's 3,086 registered voters, for a turnout of 73.7%. In the 2004 presidential election, Democrat John Kerry received 58.8% of the vote (1,309 ballots cast), outpolling Republican George W. Bush, who received around 39.9% (888 votes), with 2,228 ballots cast among the borough's 2,982 registered voters, for a turnout percentage of 74.7.

United States presidential election results for Mount Ephraim
Year	Republican		Democratic		Third party(ies)	
Year	No.	%	No.	%	No.	%
2024	1,214	46.85%	1,341	51.76%	36	1.39%
2020	1,214	44.70%	1,453	53.50%	49	1.80%
2016	966	44.15%	1,131	51.69%	91	4.16%
2012	793	37.65%	1,278	60.68%	35	1.66%
2008	855	37.58%	1,334	58.64%	86	3.78%
2004	888	39.86%	1,309	58.75%	31	1.39%

In the 2013 gubernatorial election, Republican Chris Christie received 62.9% of the vote (753 cast), ahead of Democrat Barbara Buono with 35.9% (430 votes), and other candidates with 1.3% (15 votes), among the 1,222 ballots cast by the borough's 3,353 registered voters (24 ballots were spoiled), for a turnout of 36.4%. In the 2009 gubernatorial election, Democrat Jon Corzine received 47.3% of the vote (621 ballots cast), ahead of both Republican Chris Christie with 42.7% (560 votes) and Independent Chris Daggett with 6.2% (81 votes), with 1,312 ballots cast among the borough's 3,127 registered voters, yielding a 42.0% turnout.

United States Senate election results for Mount Ephraim1
Year	Republican		Democratic		Third party(ies)	
Year	No.	%	No.	%	No.	%
2024	1,075	42.81%	1,404	55.91%	32	1.27%
2018	866	46.74%	844	45.55%	143	7.72%
2012	711	36.07%	1,228	62.30%	32	1.62%
2006	509	40.14%	728	57.41%	31	2.44%

United States Senate election results for Mount Ephraim2
Year	Republican		Democratic		Third party(ies)	
Year	No.	%	No.	%	No.	%
2020	1,125	42.42%	1,498	56.49%	29	1.09%
2014	413	40.57%	582	57.17%	23	2.26%
2013	300	51.11%	277	47.19%	10	1.70%
2008	715	35.84%	1,238	62.06%	42	2.11%

== Education ==
The Mount Ephraim Public Schools serve students in pre-kindergarten through eighth grade. As of the 2018–19 school year, the district, comprised of two schools, had an enrollment of 413 students and 38.0 classroom teachers (on an FTE basis), for a student–teacher ratio of 10.9:1. Schools in the district (with 2018–19 enrollment data from the National Center for Education Statistics) are Mary Bray Elementary School with 240 students in grades Pre-K–4 and Raymond W. Kershaw Middle School with 162 students in grades 5–8.

For ninth through twelfth grades, public school students attend Audubon High School, in Audubon, as part of a sending/receiving relationship with the Audubon School District. As of the 2018–19 school year, the high school had an enrollment of 804 students and 66.5 classroom teachers (on an FTE basis), for a student–teacher ratio of 12.1:1.

== Transportation ==
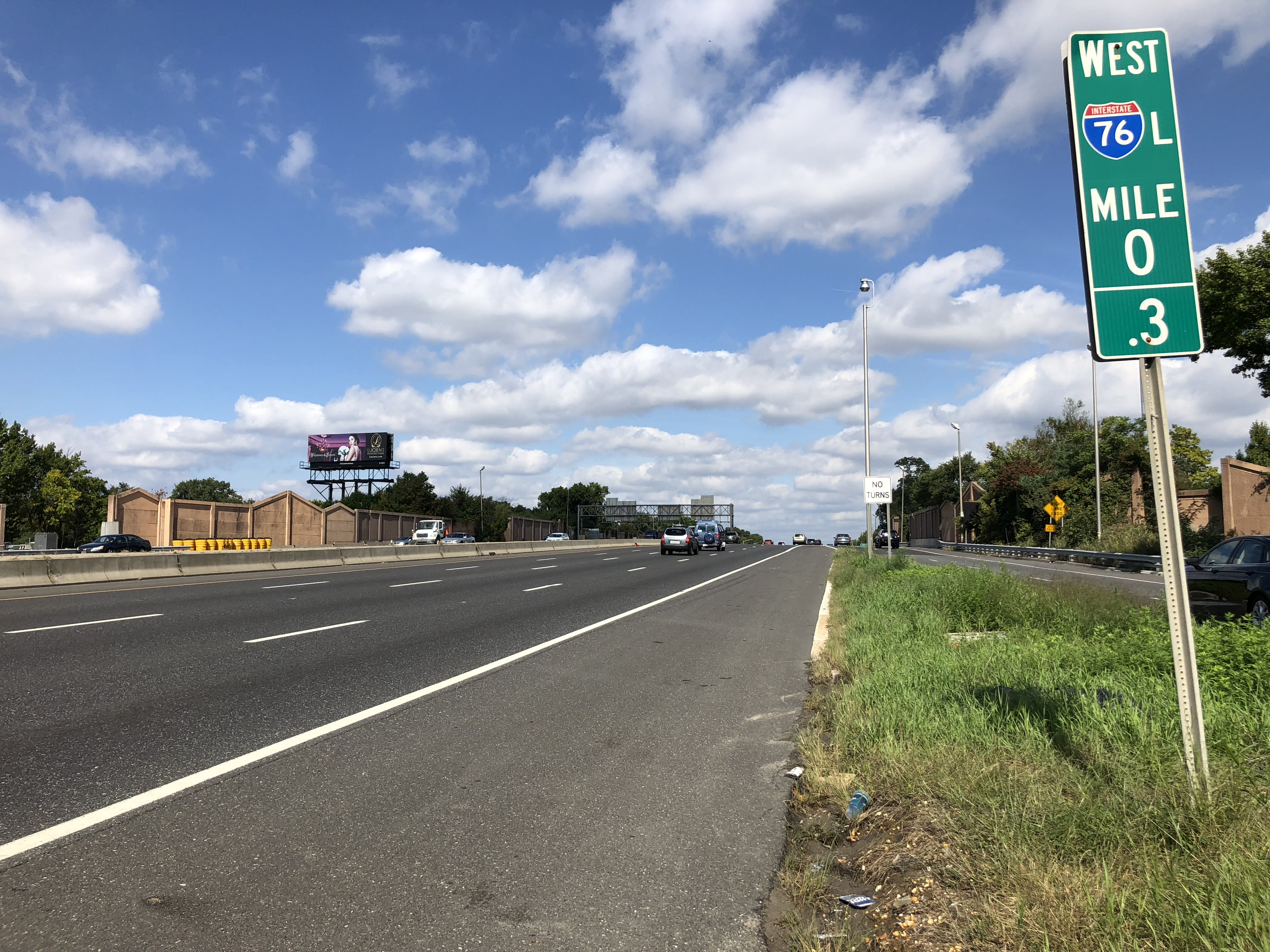
Interstate 76 westbound in Mount Ephraim

=== Roads and highways ===
As of May 2010, the borough had a total of 16.67 miles (26.83 km) of roadways, of which 13.25 miles (21.32 km) were maintained by the municipality, 2.35 miles (3.78 km) by Camden County and 1.07 miles (1.72 km) by the New Jersey Department of Transportation.

Interstate 76 passes through Mount Ephraim, with part of the interchange with Interstate 295 located within the borough.

=== Public transportation ===
Mount Ephraim is served by two NJ Transit bus lines. Service between the borough and Philadelphia is available on the 400 route, with local service on the 457 route between the Moorestown Mall and Camden.

== Notable people ==
People who were born in, residents of, or otherwise closely associated with Mount Ephraim include:

- Dan Baker (born 1946), Philadelphia Phillies PA Announcer and former Philadelphia Eagles PA Announcer
- Bobby Clarke (born 1949), former Philadelphia Flyers hockey team captain and general manager
- Edith Fore, TV commercial actress for Life Alert, "I've fallen and I can't get up"
- Ben Vaughn, singer, songwriter, musician, record producer, composer for television / film, and syndicated radio show host
