= Nelson V. Brittin =

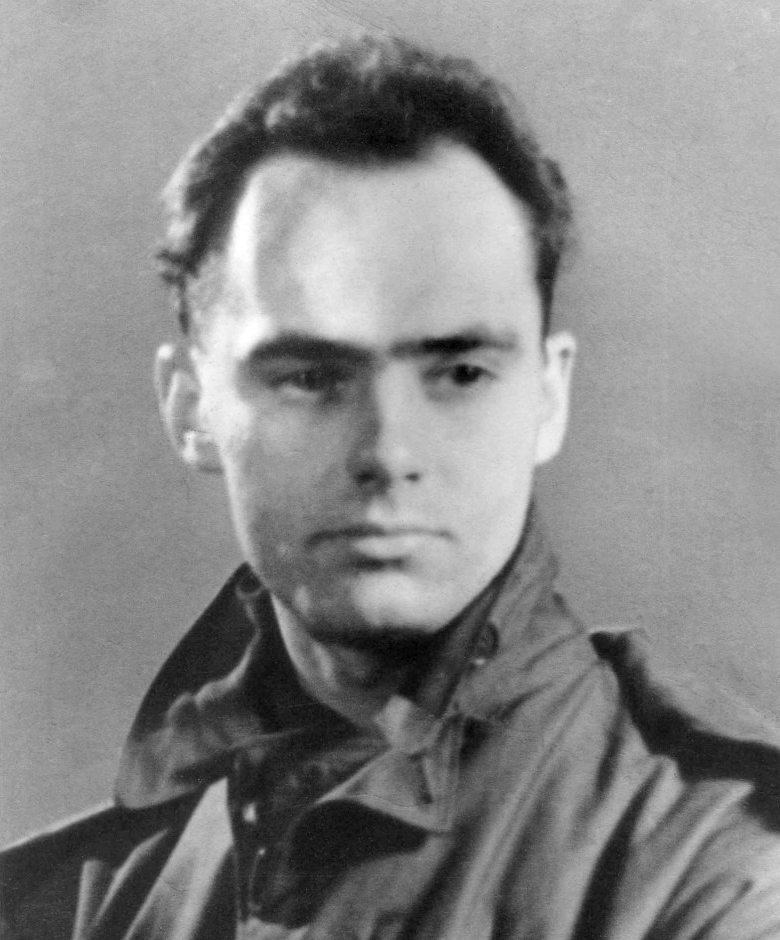
- Born: October 31, 1920; Audubon, New Jersey, US
- Died: March 7, 1951 (aged 30) near Yonggong-ni, Korea
- Military career
- Allegiance: United States
- Branch: United States Army
- Service years: 1942–1946; 1948–1951
- Rank: Sergeant First Class
- Units: Company I, 19th Infantry Regiment
- Conflicts: World War II; Korean War †
- Awards: Medal of Honor; Purple Heart

Nelson Vogel Brittin (October 31, 1920 – March 7, 1951) was a United States Army soldier who was posthumously awarded the Medal of Honor for his actions in Yonggong-ni, Korea, on March 7, 1951.

Brittin graduated from Audubon High School in Audubon, New Jersey, in 1938 and was drafted into the United States Army from Audubon on July 7, 1942. He was discharged in 1946, and briefly studied at the University of Florence before re-enlisting in 1948.

== Medal of Honor ==
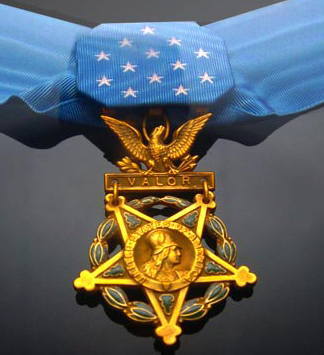

Nelson V. Brittin
Rank and organization: Sergeant First Class, U.S. Army, Company I, 3rd Battalion, 19th Infantry Regiment, 24th Infantry Division
Action Date: 7-Mar-51
Entered service at: Audubon, New Jersey.
G.O. No.: 84, September 5, 1952.
General Orders: Department of the Army, General Orders No. 12 (February 1, 1952)

The President of the United States of America, in the name of Congress, takes pride in presenting the MEDAL OF HONOR (Posthumously) to

SERGEANT FIRST CLASS NELSON VOGEL BRITTIN, RA-3227149
UNITED STATES ARMY

Citation:

For conspicuous gallantry and intrepidity above and beyond the call of duty while serving with Company I, 3d Battalion, 19th Infantry Regiment, 24th Infantry Division, in action against enemy aggressor forces at Yonggong-ni, Korea on 7 March 1951. Volunteering to lead his squad up a hill, with meager cover against murderous fire from the enemy, Sergeant First Class BRITTIN ordered his squad to give him support and, in the face of withering fire and bursting shells, he tossed a grenade at the nearest enemy position. On returning to his squad, he was knocked down and wounded by an enemy grenade. Refusing medical attention, he replenished his supply of grenades and returned, hurling grenades into hostile positions and shooting the enemy as they fled. When his weapon jammed, he leaped without hesitation into a foxhole and killed the occupants with his bayonet and the butt of his rifle. He continued to wipe out foxholes and, noting that his squad had been pinned down, he rushed to the rear of a machinegun position, threw a grenade into the nest, and ran around to its front, where he killed all three occupants with his rifle. Less than 100 yards up the hill, his squad again came under vicious fire from another camouflaged, sandbagged, machinegun nest well-flanked by supporting riflemen. Sergeant First Class BRITTIN again charged this new position in an aggressive endeavor to silence this remaining obstacle and ran direct into a burst of automatic fire which killed him instantly. In his sustained and driving action, he had killed 20 enemy soldiers and destroyed four automatic weapons. The conspicuous courage, consummate valor, and noble self-sacrifice displayed by Sergeant First Class BRITTIN enabled his inspired company to attain its objective and reflect the highest glory on himself and the heroic traditions of the military service.

== Awards and decorations ==
Brittin's military awards include:

Badge	Combat Infantryman Badge with star denoting 2nd award		
1st row	Medal of Honor	Bronze Star Medal	Purple Heart with 1 Oak leaf cluster
2nd row	Army Good Conduct Medal with 2 Good Conduct Loops	American Campaign Medal	European–African–Middle Eastern Campaign Medal with 1 Campaign star
3rd row	World War II Victory Medal	Army of Occupation Medal with 'Japan' clasp	National Defense Service Medal
4th row	Korean Service Medal with 1 Campaign star	United Nations Service Medal Korea	Korean War Service Medal
Unit awards	Korean Presidential Unit Citation		

== Legacy and honors ==
Named in his honor:

- MV Nelson V. Brittin (ESB-4), formerly USNS Brittin (T-AKR-305), a Bob Hope-class roll-on/roll-off vehicle cargo ship built by Northrop Grumman Ship Systems, New Orleans.

== See also ==
- List of Korean War Medal of Honor recipients
