= Mount Ephraim Public Schools =

School district in Camden County, New Jersey, US

Address
- 125 South Black Horse Pike Mount Ephraim, Camden County, New Jersey, 08059; United States
- Coordinates: 39.879263°N 75.085282°W

District information
- Grades: Pre-K to 8
- Superintendent: Michael Hunter
- Business administrator: Christopher Eberly
- Schools: 2

Students and staff
- Enrollment: 413 (as of 2018–19)
- Faculty: 38.0 FTEs
- Student–teacher ratio: 10.9:1

Other information
- District Factor Group: CD
- Website: www.mtephraimschools.com
Ind.	Per pupil	District spending	Rank (*)	K-8 average	%± vs. average
1A	Total Spending	$16,669	16	$18,891	−11.8%
1	Budgetary Cost	13,403	21	14,159	−5.3%
2	Classroom Instruction	7,710	12	8,659	−11.0%
6	Support Services	2,432	40	2,167	12.2%
8	Administrative Cost	1,643	30	1,547	6.2%
10	Operations & Maintenance	1,585	33	1,612	−1.7%
13	Extracurricular Activities	34	5	104	−67.3%
16	Median Teacher Salary	58,358	26	61,136
Data from NJDoE 2014 Taxpayers' Guide to Education Spending. *Of K-8 districts with 401-750 students. Lowest spending=1; Highest=64

The Mount Ephraim Public Schools are a community public school district that serves students in pre-kindergarten through eighth grade from Mount Ephraim, in Camden County, in the U.S. state of New Jersey.

As of the 2018–19 school year, the district, comprising two schools, had an enrollment of 413 students and 38.0 classroom teachers (on an FTE basis), for a student–teacher ratio of 10.9:1.

The district is classified by the New Jersey Department of Education as being in District Factor Group "CD", the sixth-highest of eight groupings. District Factor Groups organize districts statewide to allow comparison by common socioeconomic characteristics of the local districts. From lowest socioeconomic status to highest, the categories are A, B, CD, DE, FG, GH, I and J.

For ninth through twelfth grades, public school students attend Audubon High School, in Audubon, as part of a sending/receiving relationship with the Audubon School District. As of the 2018–19 school year, the high school had an enrollment of 804 students and 66.5 classroom teachers (on an FTE basis), for a student–teacher ratio of 12.1:1.

== History ==
In July 1926, Mount Ephraim announced that it would starting sending students in ninth grade to the new Audubon High School, while students in grades 10-12 would continue their education at Haddon Heights High School.

== Schools ==
Schools in the district (with 2018–19 enrollment data from the National Center for Education Statistics) are:

- Mary Bray Elementary School with 240 students in grades PreK-4
  - Jennifer Schoepflin, principal
- Raymond W. Kershaw Middle School with 162 students in grades 5–8
  - Michael Hunter, principal

== Administration ==
Core members of the district's administration are:

- Michael Hunter, superintendent
- Christopher Eberly, school business administrator and board secretary

== Board of education ==
The district's board of education, comprised of nine members, sets policy and oversees the fiscal and educational operation of the district through its administration. As a Type II school district, the board's trustees are elected directly by voters to serve three-year terms of office on a staggered basis, with three seats up for election each year held (since 2012) as part of the November general election. The board appoints a superintendent to oversee the district's day-to-day operations and a business administrator to supervise the business functions of the district.
