= Anne McConaghie Volp =

American field hockey player

- Anne McConaghie Volp

Personal information
- Born: Aug 22, 1921
- Died: May 22, 2010 (aged 88) Honesdale, Pennsylvania, US

Anne McConaghie Volp (Aug 22, 1921 – May 22, 2010), known prior to her marriage in 1945 as Anne McConaghie, was an American field hockey player and coach. She played on the United States women's national field hockey team for 14 years and was in the first class of inductees into the U.S. Field Hockey Association Hall of Fame.

== Early years ==
McConaghie was born in Audubon, New Jersey. She graduated in 1939 from Audubon High School in New Jersey where she was a member of the basketball, softball, tennis, and swimming teams. She next attended Temple University in Philadelphia, graduating in 1943 with a bachelor's degree in physical education. She later received a master's in physical education from Temple. While at Temple, McConaghie competed in field hockey beginning in 1939. She also competed in diving, swimming, basketball, and lacrosse at Temple. She was named to the All-College basketball team in 1940 and 1943. She was also undefeated in intercollegiate diving competition.

== Career ==
She became one of the best field hockey players in the United States and was selected to the All-America team 12 times. She was also a member of the U.S. national field hockey team for 14 years and the team captain for five of those years.

She later worked as a health and physical education instructor at Temple and was the school's head field hockey coach for fifteen years. She also taught and coached at Audubon High School and Enfield Junior High School in Springfield Township, Montgomery County, Pennsylvania.

== Family and later years ==
She was married in 1945 to Frederick G. Volp.

In 1988, she became one of the charter inductees into the USA Field Hockey Hall of Fame. She was also inducted into the Temple University Athletic Hall of Fame in 1975.

On May 22, 2010, Volp died of complications from dementia at a health care facility in Honesdale, Pennsylvania. She was 88 years old when she died.
