= Audubon High School (New Jersey) =

High school in Camden County, New Jersey, US

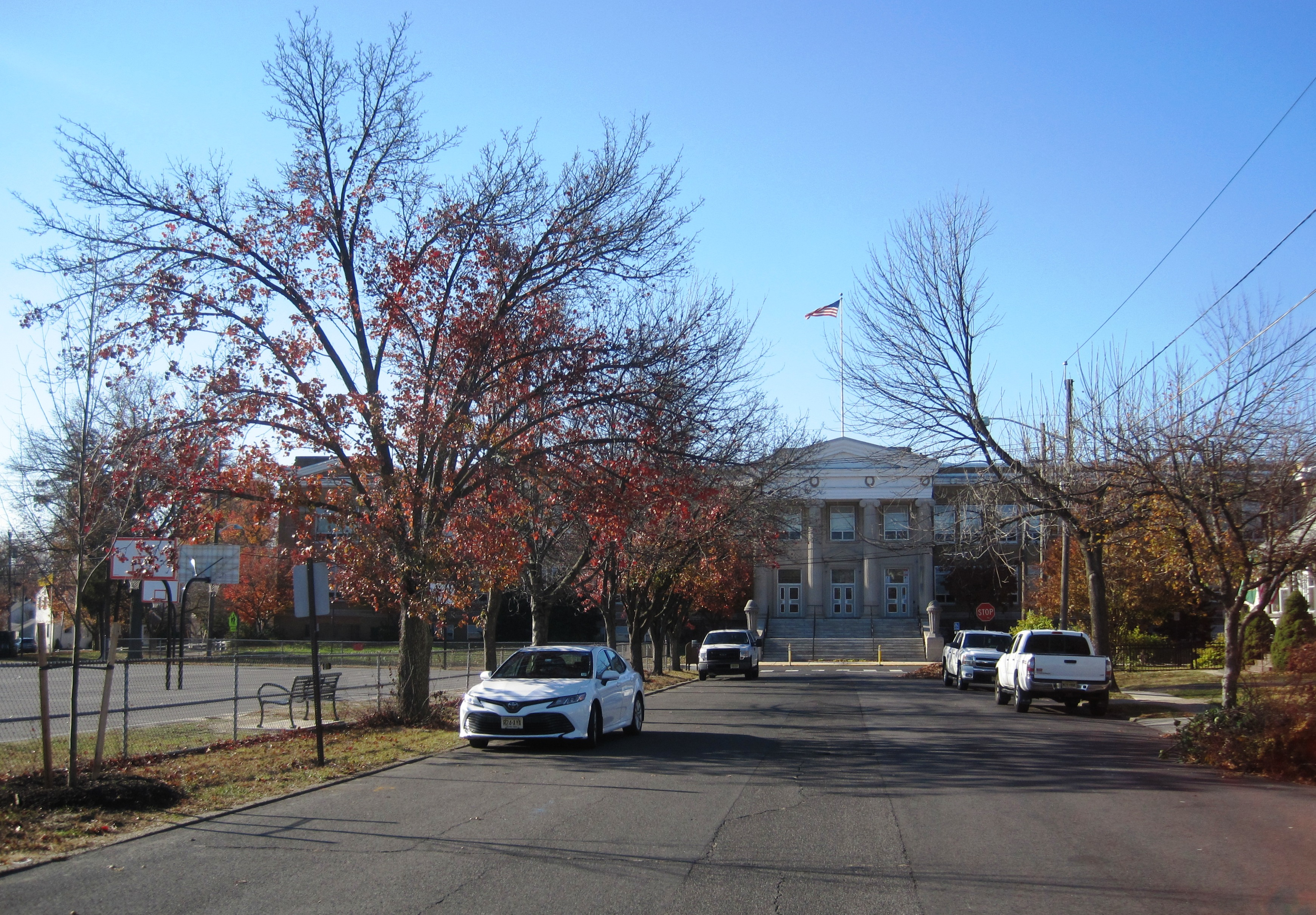

Location
- 350 Edgewood Avenue; Audubon, Camden County, New Jersey 08106; United States; 39.885064°N 75.076064°W

Information
- Type: Public high school
- Motto: "A Tradition of Pride and Excellence"
- Established: September 1926
- School district: Audubon School District
- NCES School ID: 340105001298
- Principal: Jeffrey W. Lebb
- Faculty: 68.0 FTEs
- Grades: 7–12
- Enrollment: 801 (as of 2024–25)
- Student to teacher ratio: 11.8:1
- Colors: Green and Gold
- Athletics conference: Colonial Conference
- Team name: Green Wave
- Website: ahs.audubonschools.org

Audubon High School is a comprehensive six-year community public high school that serves students in seventh through twelfth grades from Audubon, in Camden County, in the southern portion of the U.S. state of New Jersey, operating as the lone secondary school of the Audubon School District.

As of the 2024–25 school year, the school had an enrollment of 801 students and 68.0 classroom teachers (on an FTE basis), for a student–teacher ratio of 11.8:1. There were 168 students (21.0% of enrollment) eligible for free lunch and 42 (5.2% of students) eligible for reduced-cost lunch.

Public school students from Mount Ephraim attend the district's high school as part of a sending/receiving relationship with the Mount Ephraim Public Schools.

== History ==
In July 1926, Mount Ephraim announced that it would starting sending students in ninth grade to the new Audubon High School, while students in grades 10-12 would continue their education at Haddon Heights High School.

The school opened in September 1926 with an enrollment of 480 students. Two years later, as the school grew, students in grades 7-9 were part of the Junior School and those in grades 10-12 the Senior School. In 2006 a science wing was added to the building. The addition included four new fully equipped science labs, a gymnasium and a band room.

In September 2012, the Audubon School District implemented the Anti-Bullying Bill of Rights Act (HIB) at Audubon High School.

In 2014, the school began a 1-to-1 Chromebook initiative. This initiative provides a Chromebook for each student to use throughout the school year.

== Awards, recognition and rankings ==
The school was the 181st-ranked public high school in New Jersey out of 339 schools statewide in New Jersey Monthly magazine's September 2014 cover story on the state's "Top Public High Schools", using a new ranking methodology. The school had been ranked 147th in the state of 328 schools in 2012, after being ranked 172nd in 2010 out of 322 schools listed. The magazine ranked the school 195th in 2008 out of 316 schools. The school was ranked 238th in the magazine's September 2006 issue, which surveyed 316 schools across the state.

== School programs ==
Project Graduation is a program that provides safe entertainment for senior students on the night of graduation. Money for this program is donated to the school directly and through fundraisers.

The Student of the Month program recognizes students who have shown an exemplary characteristic daily. A student from each grade is chosen each month to receive an award package and a certificate. This program was initiated by The Intervention and Referral Services Team as a joint venture with the Renaissance Program.

The Student Spotlight program recognizes students who are making a positive impact on campus. The program seeks to encourage academic excellence, school spirit and citizenship.

The Project Memorial Foundation was established in 1994 to show patriotism among students. The program has received multiple honors and awards from both military and civic groups.

The Parrot is the school's newspaper. The newspaper is written and edited by students and staff and covers topics important to the school. The organization also hosts a podcast where students can submit their creative works.

The Student Council consists of student representatives voted for by the student body. The organization aims to strengthen the relationship between students, administration, faculty and the Audubon Board of Education. Students also organize community service projects and school activities such as school dances, homecoming events, pep rallies, the Thanksgiving food drive and Senior Citizen's Spring and Winter socials.

== Athletics ==
The Audubon High School Green Wave compete as a member school in the Colonial Conference, which is comprised of small schools in Camden and Gloucester counties whose enrollments generally do not exceed between 750-800 students for grades 9-12 and operates under the jurisdiction of the New Jersey State Interscholastic Athletic Association. With 429 students in grades 10-12, the school was classified by the NJSIAA for the 2022–24 school years as Group I South for most athletic competition purposes. The football team competes in the Colonial Division of the 94-team West Jersey Football League superconference and was classified by the NJSIAA as Group I South for football for 2022–2024, which included schools with 185 to 482 students.

The school participates as the host school / lead agency for joint boys / girls swimming teams with Collingswood High School. These co-op programs operate under agreements scheduled to expire at the end of the 2023–24 school year.

The 1963 boys basketball team defeated Paramus High School in the tournament finals by a score of 53-50 to win the Group III state championship at Atlantic City Convention Hall.

Down 14-0 at halftime, the 1975 football team came back to win the South Jersey Group II state sectional title with a 22-20 win against Pleasantville High School in the championship game to finish the season with a 10-1 record. The traditional Thanksgiving Day football game is against Haddon Township High School. Audubon won the Thanksgiving 2019 game by a score of 18-0, bringing their series record to 39-17-1.

Wrestling Coach Dave Lang led the Green Wave to District 28 titles in both 1997 and 1999.

The baseball team was awarded the South Jersey Group III title in 1961, 1964 and 1969. The team won the Group II title in 1975 (defeating runner-up New Providence High School in the finals), 1996 (vs. Newton High School), 1998 (vs. Glen Rock High School) and 2001 (vs. Newton), and Group I championships in 1994 (vs. Emerson Junior-Senior High School), 1995 (vs. Pequannock Township High School), 2011 (Waldwick High School) and 2012 (vs. Pompton Lakes High School). The program's seven state championships are tied for fifth-most in the state. From the early 1990s to the early 2000s, many considered Audubon's baseball team a dynasty; winning state championships in 1994, 1995, 1996, 1998 and 2001. A 3-0 win in the 1996 championship game against Emerson gave the team the Group II title and a 20-6 record for the season. The 1996 team finished the season with a 21-4-1 record after winning the Group II state title by defeating Newton by a score of 8-1 in the playoff finals; Audubon became the fourth school in the state to win three consecutive group titles. The 1998 team held on for a 7-6 win against Glen Rock to win the Group II state championship and finish the season 30-2. The 2001 team finished the season with a record of 28-4 after winning the Group II state championship with an 8-1 win over Newton. In June 2011, Audubon's baseball team defeated Waldwick High School for the Group I state championship, the team's seventh overall in the playoff era.

The girls softball team won the Group II state championships in 1976 (defeating Hawthorne High School in the tournament final) and 1977 (vs. Rutherford High School). The 1977 team had a 14-run third inning on the way to winning the Group II title with a 16-3 defeat of Rutherford in the championship game.

The field hockey team won the Central Jersey Group I sectional championship in 2010 and 2011. The team won the 2005 and 2006 Patriot Division championships.

In 2018, the girls soccer team won the high school's first Group I state championship. The game went into penalty kicks with the win, taking down Glen Ridge High School.

The boys cross country team won the Group I state championship in 2021.

The boys spring / outdoor track team won the Group I state championship in 2022.

== Marching band ==
The school's marching band was Tournament of Bands Chapter One Champions in 1991 (Group 1). The marching band was 2005 Atlantic Coast Invitational Champion in Group 2 and 2004 Atlantic Coast Invitational Champion in Group 3. They also took first as Group II A Northern State Champions with the caption of Best Color Guard and Best Visual in 2010 with their show Celestial Journey. In 2013, they won TOB New Jersey States Championships for group II and South Jersey Group II Championships. In 2015, the marching band used a custom-made show edited by Lee Deloach to win the USBands Group II A New Jersey state championship at Union High School with a score of 95.525. In 2016, the marching band won the USSBA Group III A national championship at Allentown, Pennsylvania with a new high score of 96.013 and winning the caption award for Best Music.

== Administration ==
The school's principal is Jeffrey W. Lebb. His core administration team includes a vice principal for grades 10-12, an assistant principal for grades 7-9, and an assistant principal of school counseling.

== Notable alumni ==
=== Medal of Honor recipients ===
A memorial outside the high school was dedicated to the borough's three Medal of Honor recipients on July 4, 1994. An annual tribute to them includes speakers from The Navy, Military Order of the Purple Heart, and the New Jersey Department of Military and Veterans Affairs

- HM3 Edward Clyde Benfold (1931–1952, class of 1949), Navy Medal of Honor (posthumous), Korean War (attached to the Marine Corps)
- SFC Nelson V. Brittin (1920-1951, class of 1939), Army Medal of Honor (posthumous), Korean War
- CPL Samuel M. Sampler (1895-1979), Army Medal of Honor, World War I

=== Sports ===
- Dan Baker (born 1946, class of 1964), stadium announcer for both the Philadelphia Phillies and the Philadelphia Eagles for more than two decades
- Joe Flacco (born 1985, class of 2003), quarterback for the Cincinnati Bengals and Super Bowl XLVII MVP
- Bill Laxton (born 1948, class of 1966), former MLB pitcher who played in all or part of five seasons in the majors between 1970 and 1977
- Brett Laxton (born 1973, class of 1992), former MLB pitcher who played in parts of two seasons for the Oakland Athletics and the Kansas City Royals
- Vic Obeck (1917–1979), professional football player and general manager
- Anne McConaghie Volp (1921–2010), field hockey player and coach, who was a member of the United States women's national field hockey team for 14 years and the team captain for five of those years

=== Others ===
- John J. Davis (born 1936), theologian, archaeologist and Christian educator who was the President of Grace Theological Seminary
- William Siri (1919-2004, class of 1937), part of the Manhattan Project which was responsible for the development of the atomic bomb and co-leader of the first American expedition to successfully climb Mount Everest and went on to climb every major mountain range in the world
- Ben Vaughn (born 1955/56, class of 1973), musical composer for the TV sitcom 3rd Rock from the Sun who also provided music for shows including That '70s Show, Men Behaving Badly, Normal, Ohio and Grounded for Life
- John L. White (1930-2001, class of 1948), politician who served in the New Jersey General Assembly and New Jersey Senate
