= Vic Obeck =

American gridiron football player, coach, and executive (1917–1979)

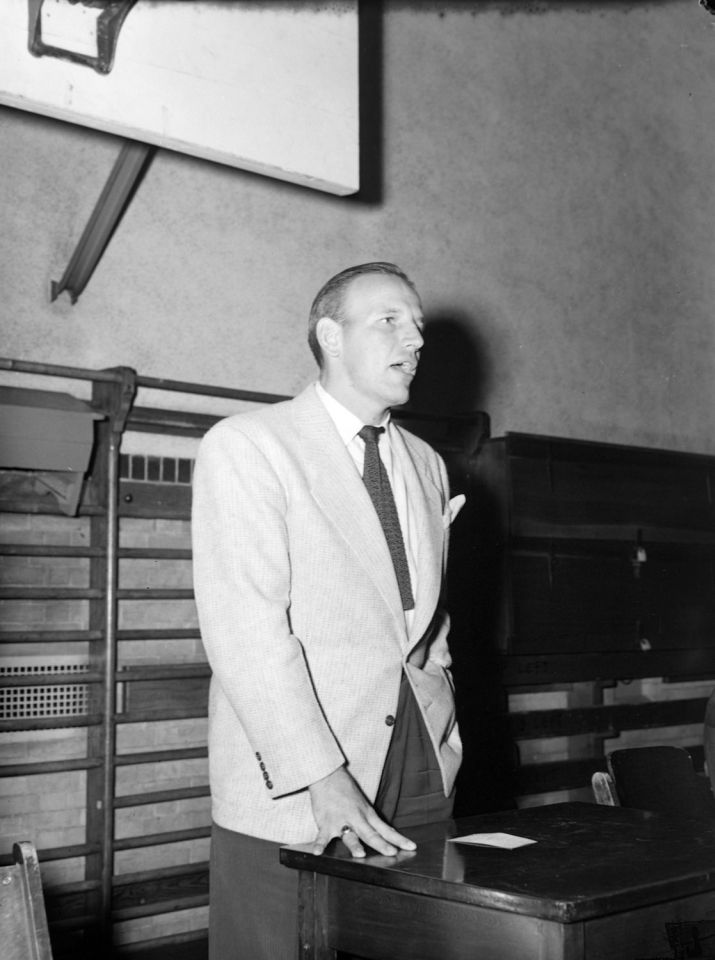
- Obeck giving a lecture in Montreal, 1948

No. 35, 75
- Position: Guard/Tackle

Personal information
- Born: March 28, 1917; Philadelphia, Pennsylvania, U.S.
- Died: April 21, 1979 (aged 62); New York City, New York, U.S.
- Listed height: 6 ft 0 in (1.83 m)
- Listed weight: 225 lb (102 kg)

Career information
- High school: Audubon (Audubon, New Jersey)
- College: Springfield College

Career history

Playing
- 1945: Chicago Cardinals
- 1946: Brooklyn Dodgers

Coaching
- 1941: Akron (Assistant coach)
- 1947–1953: McGill (Head coach)

Operations
- 1947–1955: McGill (Athletic director)
- 1955–1956: Montreal Alouettes (General manager)
- 1957–1966: NYU (Athletic director)
- 1966: Brooklyn Dodgers (Executive VP)
- 1968: Westchester Bulls (Vice president)

Victor Francis Joseph Obeck (March 28, 1917 – April 21, 1979) was an American gridiron football player, coach, and executive.

Obeck played high school football at Audubon High School, where his team won the New Jersey state championship. He played tackle at Springfield College from 1938 to 1940. He served as an assistant football coach at the University of Akron for one season before joining the United States Navy. Following his discharge, he played for the Chicago Cardinals of the National Football League and Brooklyn Dodgers of the All-America Football Conference.

In 1947, Obeck was named head football coach and athletic director at McGill University. He stepped down as head football coach in 1953 and left the school entirely in 1955 to become the general manager of the Montreal Alouettes. He posted a 23–22–2 record at McGill and a 20–6 record with the Alouettes. The Alouettes appeared in the Grey Cup during both of Obeck's seasons as GM.

While in Montreal, Obeck hosted The Vic Obeck Show also known as Vic Obeck's Parade of Sports, a television show dedicated to sports with an emphasis on football.

Obeck returned to the United States in 1957 to become the athletic director at New York University. Obeck left NYU in 1966 and later that year became the Executive Vice President of the Brooklyn Dodgers of the Continental Football League. The team disbanded after one season and in 1968 he joined front office staff of the Atlantic Coast Football League's Westchester Bulls. In 1964, he wrote and published a book on isometric exercise called How to Exercise Without Moving A Muscle.

While at NYU, Obeck served as a college and high school basketball color commentator for WPIX; calling games alongside future Basketball Hall of Famer Marty Glickman.

Obeck returned to Canada in 1969, working public relations for a security agency and establishing youth football camps. He also served as a member of the Canadian Olympic Committee and was a publicist during the 1976 Summer Olympics in Montreal. Obeck died on April 21, 1979, in New York City. In 2009, he was inducted to the McGill Sports Hall of Fame.
