= Commission for Complaints for Telecom-television Services =

- Commission des plaintes relatives aux services de télécom-télévision

Non-government Agency overview
- Formed: 2007
- Jurisdiction: Non-governmental Agency
- Headquarters: Ottawa, Ontario, Canada
- Minister responsible: Marc Miller, Minister of Canadian Heritage
- Non-government Agency executive: Howard Maker, Commissioner
- Parent department: Canadian Heritage
- Website: www.ccts-cprst.ca

The Commission for Complaints for Telecom-television Services (CCTS; French: Commission des plaintes relatives aux services de télécom-télévision, CPRST) is Canada's national, independent and industry-funded organization created to resolve telecommunication and television service complaints from consumers and small business customers fairly and free of charge.

The CCTS was established in 2007 by the Canadian Radio-television and Telecommunications Commission, Canada's telecommunications and broadcasting regulator. All telecommunication and licensed television service providers must participate in the CCTS' complaint resolution process.

The CCTS' mission is to provide impartial, fair, and effective complaint resolution services, data, and insights to telecommunications and television consumers and service providers.

Most recently in 2023-24, the CCTS responded to a 38% increase in complaints. More than 17,000 were billing-related issues, up 52% from the previous year, when billing accounted for 39% of all issues raised. Top billing issues included unexpected charges, unexpected price increases, and failure to provide promised credits or refunds.

The CCTS is accused of unfairness and there are many conflict of interest issues:

- CCTS gets its direct funding by telecommunication companies and pays CCTS salaries
- CCTS has many employees that work also for the telecommunication companies
- Many of CCTS Board members are employees of these telecommunication companies
- CCTS forces all telecom complaints to be filed with them, even those who have already been handled by another complaints agency
