= Samuel M. Sampler =

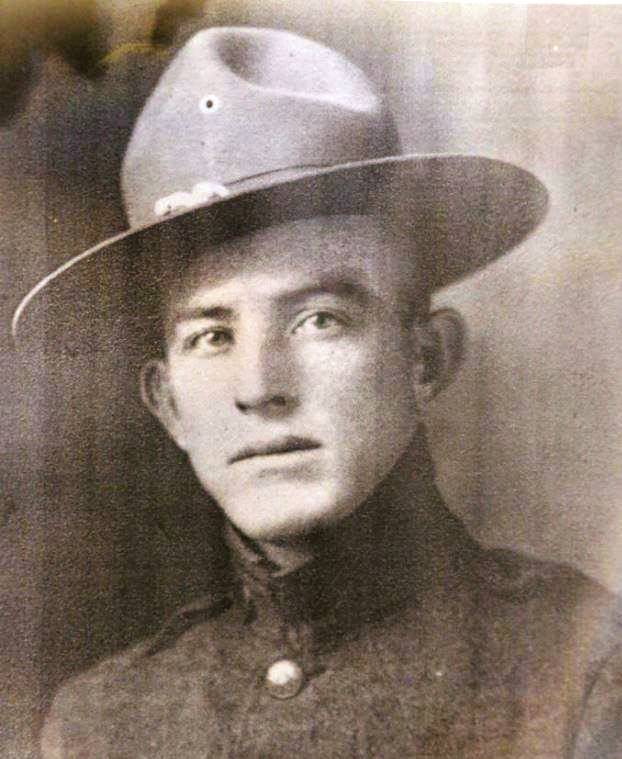
- Medal of Honor recipient
- Born: January 27, 1895; Decatur, Texas
- Died: November 19, 1979 (aged 84)
- Burial place: Fort Myers Memorial Gardens, Fort Myers, Florida
- Military career
- Allegiance: United States
- Branch: United States Army
- Rank: Corporal
- Service number: 1490609
- Units: 142nd Infantry Regiment, 36th Division
- Conflicts: World War I
- Awards: Medal of Honor

Samuel M. Sampler (January 27, 1895 – November 19, 1979) was a United States Army soldier who received the Medal of Honor for his actions during World War I.

== Biography ==
Born on January 27, 1895, in Decatur, Texas, Sampler was raised in Audubon, New Jersey. He enlisted in the Army from Altus, Oklahoma, and served in Europe as a corporal with Company H of the 142nd Infantry Regiment, 36th Division. During an attack near Saint-Étienne-à-Arnes, France, on October 8, 1918, his company's advance was halted and they took heavy casualties from a German machine gun nest. Sampler single-handedly charged the hostile position and silenced it with hand grenades, killing two German soldiers and capturing 28. For this action, he was awarded the Medal of Honor the next year, in 1919.

Sampler's official Medal of Honor citation reads:

His company having suffered severe casualties during an advance under machinegun fire, was finally stopped. Cpl. Sampler detected the position of the enemy machineguns on an elevation. Armed with German handgrenades, which he had picked up, he left the line and rushed forward in the face of heavy fire until he was near the hostile nest, where he grenaded the position. His third grenade landed among the enemy, killing 2, silencing the machineguns, and causing the surrender of 28 Germans, whom he sent to the rear as prisoners. As a result of his act the company was immediately enabled to resume the advance.

Sampler died at age 84 on November 19, 1979, and was buried at Fort Myers Memorial Gardens in Fort Myers, Florida.

== See also ==
- List of Medal of Honor recipients for World War I
