= Camden County Technical Schools Pennsauken Campus =

High school in Camden County, New Jersey, US

Location
- 6008 Browning Road; Pennsauken Township, Camden County, New Jersey 08109; United States
- 39.9389°N 75.0649°W

Information
- Type: Public, Voc-tech high school
- Established: 1928
- School district: Camden County Technical Schools
- NCES School ID: 340267001412
- Principal: Matthew Hallinan
- Faculty: 71.3 FTEs
- Grades: 9-12
- Enrollment: 786 (as of 2024–25)
- Student to teacher ratio: 11.0:1
- Colors: Gray; Maroon; White
- Athletics conference: Olympic Conference
- Team name: Tornadoes
- Website: www.pennsauken.ccts.org

Camden County Technical Schools Pennsauken Campus, also known as Pennsauken Tech, originally Camden County Vocational School, is a four-year regional vocational-technical public high school located in Pennsauken Township, in Camden County, in the U.S. state of New Jersey, that serves students in ninth through twelfth grades from across Camden County as part of the Camden County Technical Schools. The schools main building opened in 1928 at a time when most county residents lived near Camden and was the district's only campus until the Camden County Technical Schools Gloucester Township Campus opened in 1969 to serve more rural, eastern portions of the county. In 2011, the campus opened the Science and Horticultural Center building to act as a multiple-classroom extension unit. Etched high-up into a portion of the front face of the school's main building is "He who hath a trade, hath an estate," a quote from Benjamin Franklin.

As of the 2024–25 school year, the school had an enrollment of 786 students and 71.3 classroom teachers (on an FTE basis), for a student–teacher ratio of 11.0:1. There were 542 students (69.0% of enrollment) eligible for free lunch and 70 (8.9% of students) eligible for reduced-cost lunch.

== Awards and recognition ==
- Named one of the 100 Best High Schools in the United States in 2004 and 2005 by U.S. News & World Report.
- Title 1 Distinguished School of Excellence by the United States Department of Education, the only high school in the state to receive the honor in 2012.
- Bronze Medal from U.S. News & World Report in 2012 and 2013.
- Named a New Jersey School of Character 2013, one of three high schools statewide to receive this honor.

== Athletics ==
The Pennsauken Tech Tornadoes compete in the Olympic Conference, an athletic conference consisting of public and private high schools located in Burlington County, Camden County and Gloucester County. Sister school and archrival, Camden County Tech Warriors also competes in the Olympic Conference. The Olympic Conference operates under the aegis of the New Jersey State Interscholastic Athletic Association (NJSIAA). With 611 students in grades 10-12, the school was classified by the NJSIAA for the 2019–20 school year as Group II for most athletic competition purposes, which included schools with an enrollment of 486 to 758 students in that grade range. The school mascot is the Tornado, but members of the school had formerly been known as the Tradesmen for the majority of its existence.

School colors are maroon, white and gray. Interscholastic athletics include boys'/girls' cross country, baseball, bowling, boys'/girls' basketball, softball and boys'/girls' volleyball.

The boys' baseball team won the NJVTAC state championship in back-to-back years, in 1997 and 1998.

== Career programs ==
- Accounting & Finance
- Allied Health/Medical Services
- Automotive
- Baking/Pastry Arts
- Business Technology
- Carpentry
- Computer Science & Information Technology
- Cosmetology
- Culinary Arts
- Digital Media Communications
- Electrical Engineering
- Environmental Studies
- Graphic Arts & Design
- Law & Public Safety
- Legal Assistant
- Pre-Engineering
- Senior Option & Independent Study
- Welding

== Activities ==
- 21st Century After-School Program
- For Inspiration and Recognition of Science & Technology (FIRST)
- Future Business Leaders of America (FBLA)
- Future Farmers of America (FFA)
- Health Occupations Students of America (HOSA)
- Interact Club
- National Honor Society
- Journalism Club
- Yearbook Club
- Student Council
- Newspaper
- Interact Club
- National Technical Honor Society
- Practical Politics
- Performing Arts
- Students Against Destructive Decisions (SADD)
- SkillsUSA
- Renaissance
- Sacred Outbreak
- Gender & Sexuality Alliance

== Administration ==
The school's principal is Matthew Hallinan. His core administration team includes two assistant principals

== Notable alumni ==
- Michellene Davis, lawyer and executive who served as acting State Treasurer of New Jersey
