= Camden County Technical Schools Gloucester Township Campus =

High school in Camden County, New Jersey, US

Location
- 343 Berlin-Cross Keys Road; Sicklerville, Camden County, New Jersey 08081; United States
- 39.7643°N 74.9756°W

Information
- Type: Public, Voc-tech high school
- Established: 1969
- School district: Camden County Technical Schools
- NCES School ID: 340267001414
- Principal: Chantell Green
- Faculty: 124.4 FTEs
- Grades: 9-12
- Enrollment: 1,403 (as of 2024–25)
- Student to teacher ratio: 11.3:1
- Colors: Gold; White and Royal Blue
- Athletics conference: Olympic Conference
- Team name: Warriors
- Website: www.gloucester.ccts.org

Camden County Technical Schools Gloucester Township Campus, also called Camden County Tech, is a vocational-technical public high school serving students in ninth through twelfth grades located in Gloucester Township, in the U.S. state of New Jersey (however it uses a Sicklerville mailing address), that operates as part of the Camden County Technical Schools. The school serves students from all of Camden County, and was opened in 1969 as the district's second high school, with the goal of expanding access in the eastern, more rural portion of Camden County.

As of the 2024–25 school year, the school had an enrollment of 1,403 students and 124.4 classroom teachers (on an FTE basis), for a student–teacher ratio of 11.3:1. There were 524 students (37.3% of enrollment) eligible for free lunch and 118 (8.4% of students) eligible for reduced-cost lunch.

== Athletics ==
The Camden County Tech Warriors compete in the Olympic Conference, an athletic conference comprised of public and private high schools located in Burlington, Camden and Gloucester counties, and operates under the supervision of the New Jersey State Interscholastic Athletic Association (NJSIAA). With 1,003 students in grades 10-12, the school was classified by the NJSIAA for the 2019–20 school year as Group III for most athletic competition purposes, which included schools with an enrollment of 761 to 1,058 students in that grade range. Sister school and archrival, Pennsauken Technical High School Tornadoes also compete in the Olympic Conference.

== Administration ==
The school's principal is Chantell Green. Her administration team includes four assistant principals
