= Camden County Technical Schools =

School district in Camden County, New Jersey, US

- 343 Berlin-Cross Keys Road Sicklerville, Camden County, New Jersey, 08081

District information
- Grades: Vocational
- Superintendent: Wanda Pichardo
- Business administrator: William M. Gerson (interim)
- Schools: 2

Students and staff
- Enrollment: 2,128 (as of 2022–23)
- Faculty: 191.7 FTEs
- Student–teacher ratio: 11.1:1

Other information
- District Factor Group: NA
- Website: www.ccts.org
Ind.	Per pupil	District spending	Rank (*)	Vocational average	%± vs. average
1A	Total Spending	$22,506	10	$18,891	19.1%
1	Budgetary Cost	19,740	15	17,296	14.1%
2	Classroom Instruction	9,988	17	9,045	10.4%
6	Support Services	1,800	9	2,269	−20.7%
8	Administrative Cost	3,337	16	2,353	41.8%
10	Operations & Maintenance	3,973	16	3,014	31.8%
13	Extracurricular Activities	588	15	464	26.7%
16	Median Teacher Salary	72,181	19	65,035
Data from NJDoE 2014 Taxpayers' Guide to Education Spending. *Of Vocational districts with any number of students. Lowest spending=1; Highest=21

The Camden County Technical Schools is a countywide public school district headquartered in the Sicklerville section of Gloucester Township that provides vocational and technical education to high school and adult students in Camden County, in the U.S. state of New Jersey.

As of the 2022–23 school year, the district, comprising two schools, had an enrollment of 2,128 students and 191.7 classroom teachers (on an FTE basis), for a student–teacher ratio of 11.1:1.

== Schools ==
Schools in the district (with 2022–23 enrollment data from the National Center for Education Statistics) are:

- Camden County Technical Schools Gloucester Township Campus in Gloucester Township with 1,394 students in grades 9-12
  - Chäntell Green, principal
- Camden County Technical Schools Pennsauken Campus in Pennsauken Township with 735 students in grades 9-12
  - Matthew Hallinan, principal

== Administration ==
Core members of the district's administration are:

- Wanda Pichardo, superintendent
- William M. Gerson, interim business administrator and board secretary

== Board of education ==
The district's board of education is comprised of the county superintendent of schools, who served on an ex officio basis, and four public members who set policy and oversee the fiscal and educational operation of the district through its administration. As a Type I school district, the board's trustees are appointed by the director of the Camden County Board of Chosen Freeholders to serve four-year terms of office on a staggered basis, with one member up for reappointment each year. The board appoints a superintendent to oversee the district's day-to-day operations and a business administrator to supervise the business functions of the district.
