= Glen Rock =

Glen Rock or Glenrock may refer to:

== Geology ==
- Glen Rock (boulder) in Glen Rock, New Jersey

== Places ==
=== Australia ===
- Glenrock, Queensland, a locality in the South Burnett Region, Queensland

=== United States ===
- Glenrock, Nebraska, an unincorporated community in Nemaha County
- Glen Rock, New Jersey, a borough in Bergen County
- Glen Rock, Pennsylvania, a borough in York County
- Glen Rock, Virginia, a neighborhood in Norfolk County
- Glenrock, Wyoming, a town in Converse County

== Railway stations ==
- Glen Rock–Main Line station, on New Jersey Transit's Main Line
- Glen Rock–Boro Hall station, on New Jersey Transit's Bergen County Line
