= Pennsville Memorial High School =

High school in Salem County, New Jersey, US

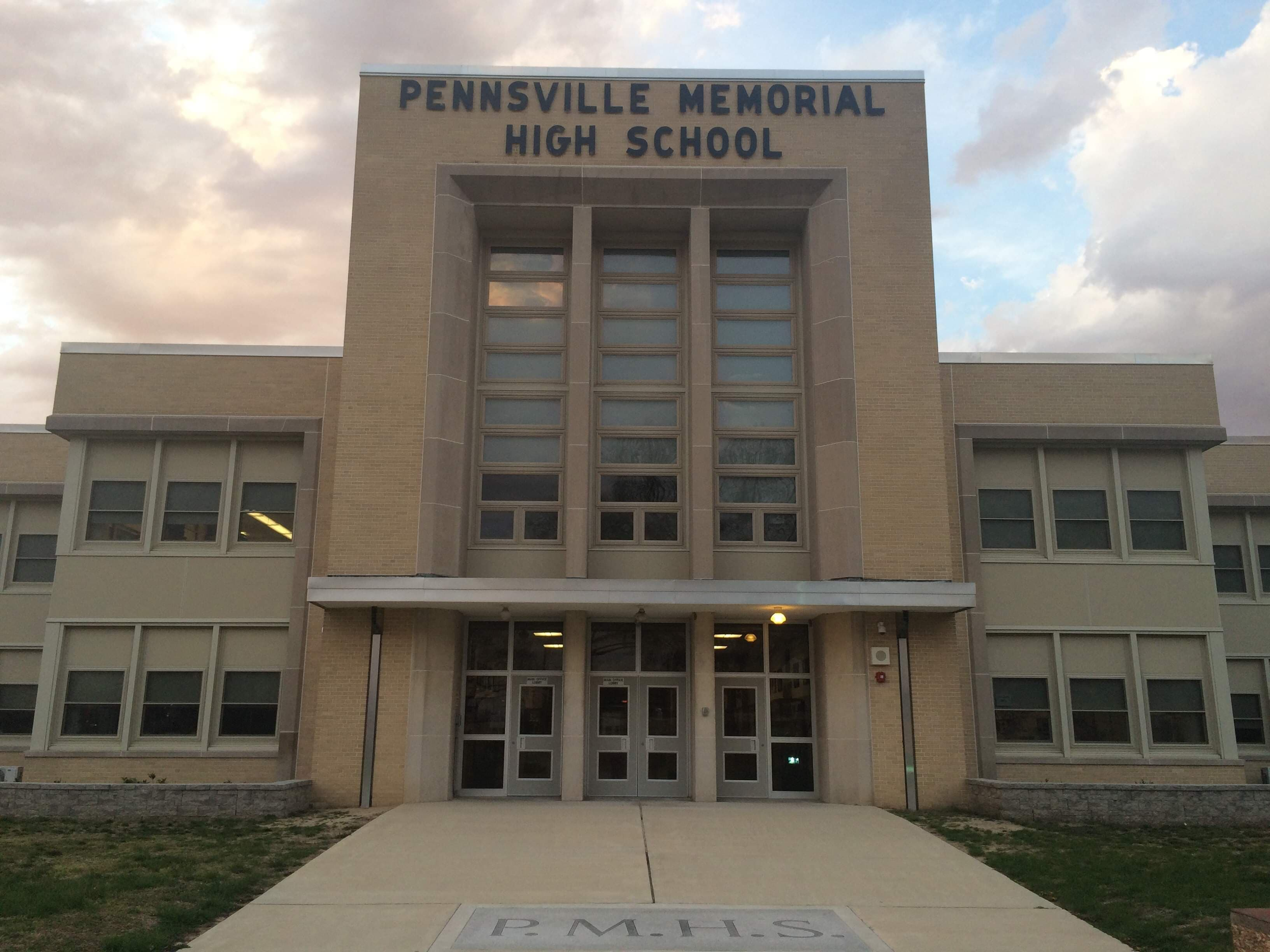

Location
- 110 South Broadway; Pennsville Township, Salem County, New Jersey 08070; United States; 39.649908°N 75.519531°W

Information
- Type: Public high school
- Motto: Carpe Diem
- Established: 1955
- School district: Pennsville School District
- NCES School ID: 340912005064
- Principal: Matthew McFarland
- Faculty: 44.9 FTEs
- Enrollment: 481 (as of 2023–24)
- Student to teacher ratio: 10.7:1
- Colors: Royal blue and Gold
- Athletics conference: Tri-County Conference (general); West Jersey Football League (football)
- Team name: Eagles
- Website: www.psdnet.org/o/phs/

Pennsville Memorial High School is comprehensive community public high school in Pennsville Township, Salem County, in the U.S. state of New Jersey, that serves students in ninth through twelfth grades as the lone secondary school of the Pennsville School District.

As of the 2023–24 school year, the school had an enrollment of 481 students and 44.9 classroom teachers (on an FTE basis), for a student–teacher ratio of 10.7:1. There were 128 students (26.6% of enrollment) eligible for free lunch and 36 (7.5% of students) eligible for reduced-cost lunch.

The Music Academy (which includes a Vocal and Instrumental Academy) and the Academy of Graphic Design in Multimedia Technology are located in the school facilities. Both of these academies are institutions hosted by Pennsville Memorial through the Salem County Vocational Technical Schools.

Starting with the 2014–15 school year, the school operates on a four-block A day and a four-block B day day schedule. Each class period is 90 minutes long. The school day officially begins at 7:40 a.m., and students are dismissed at 2:15 p.m. Lunch periods are 30 minutes in duration. The school had previously had nine periods of classes that were 41 minutes each (including lunch) prior to the 2014–2015 school year.

== History ==
The initial high school facility began in September 1950 as Lower Penn's Neck Memorial School. In that year, the district was spending $80,000 each year to send 500 students out of the district to attend high school as part of sending/receiving relationships.

The district spent $1.23 million (equivalent to $14.8 million in 2025) for an addition to Memorial School that would be used to house the high school.

The high school program was started at the start of the 1955–56 school year with ninth grade students at Memorial School, prior to which high school students from the township attended either Penns Grove High School or Salem High School.

== Awards, recognition and rankings ==
The school was the 255th-ranked public high school in New Jersey out of 339 schools statewide in New Jersey Monthly magazine's September 2014 cover story on the state's "Top Public High Schools", using a new ranking methodology. The school had been ranked 159th in the state of 328 schools in 2012, after being ranked 209th in 2010 out of 322 schools listed. The magazine ranked the school 206th in 2008 out of 316 schools. The school was ranked 257th in the magazine's September 2006 issue, which surveyed 316 schools across the state.

== Athletics ==
The Pennsville Memorial High School Eagles compete as one of the member schools in the Tri-County Conference, which is comprised of public and private high schools located in Camden, Cape May, Cumberland, Gloucester and Salem counties. The conference is overseen by the New Jersey State Interscholastic Athletic Association (NJSIAA). With 326 students in grades 10–12, the school was classified by the NJSIAA for the 2022–24 school years as Group I South for most athletic competition purposes. The football team competes in the Royal Division of the 94-team West Jersey Football League superconference and was classified by the NJSIAA as Group I South for football for 2024–2026, which included schools with 185 to 482 students.

The football team won the South Jersey Group II state sectional titles in both 1974 (awarded by NJSIAA) and 1981, and the South Jersey Group I in 2015. The 1984 team finished the season with an 11–0 record after winning the South Jersey Group II state sectional title by defeating Haddon Township High School by a score of 6–0 in the playoff finals. The team won the South Jersey Group I state sectional championship in 2015 against Clayton High School by a score of 28–6 in the tournament final. The team finished with an 11–1 record, and marked the first time the football team had won a state championship in 34 years and the first time they won in Group I. Every year before Thanksgiving (except for the 2018 season where the game was held on the first game of the season), there's a memorial football game between Pennsville and Pennsgrove and whoever wins receive the Norm Willy Boot Trophy as a tribute to one of Pennsville's fallen coaches and former defensive lineman for the Philadelphia Eagles. Pennsville also competes for the Old Oaken Bucket Trophy, a prize for the winner of Pennsville/Salem game. The healthy competition of passing the bucket started more than 50 years ago during the first Pennsville/Salem football game. Between 1985 and 2005, Salem had a winning streak and was in possession of the Old Oaken Bucket until Pennsville won it back in fall 2005. The Old Oaken Bucket Trophy would go missing until it was found on the front lawn of Pennsville Memorial High School nine years later.

The baseball team won the Group II state championship in 1981 (defeating Saddle Brook High School in the tournament final) and 1984 (vs. Lyndhurst High School), and won the Group I title in 2002 (vs. Whippany Park High School), 2003 (vs. Henry P. Becton Regional High School), 2005 (vs. Whippany Park High School), 2006 (vs. Pascack Hills High School) and 2016 (vs. Waldwick High School). The program's seven state titles are tied for fifth-most in the state. The 1981 baseball team was the first NJSIAA baseball team to have an undefeated season, finishing with a 25–0 season. In 1988, the team won the Diamond Classic, a 16-team tournament consisting of seven South Jersey division/conference leaders and nine at-large bids taken from the Courier-Post Top 20. The team won the 2002 Group I state championship with a 3–2 win against Whippany Park High School. The team repeated in 2003 as Group I state champions with a 9–2 win against Becton Regional High School. In 2004, the Eagles would again win the South Jersey Group I championship before falling to New Providence High School 3–2 in the Group I semifinal. The Eagles won the 2005 Group I State Championship in similar fashion to their 2002 championship with a 3–2 win over Whippany Park High School. Also in 2005, the team defeated Gloucester Catholic High School 5–4 to win the Diamond Classic. They also received the Courier Cup, given to the top ranked team in the Courier-Post Top 20. The Eagles won the 2006 Group I state championship with a 9–3 win over Pascack Hills. The six-year South Jersey Group I champion streak ended in 2008 when the Eagles fell to the Pitman High School Panthers in the South Jersey Group I sectional semi-final 3–1. In 2014, the Eagles would reclaim the South Jersey Group I title with a 12–2 win over the Glassboro High School Bulldogs. as well as reclaim the Courier Cup. In 2016, Pennsville defeated Waldwick High School in the tournament finals by a score of 3–2 to win the Group I state championship at Toms River East High School.

The field hockey team won the South Jersey Group II state sectional championship and the Group II state title in 1982.

The wrestling team won the South Jersey Group II state sectional championship in 1982, 1983, 1988 and 1993.

The softball team won the Group II state championship in 1993 (against Jefferson Township High School in the finals) and won the Group II title in 2002 (vs. Saddle Brook High School) and 2008 (vs. High Tech High School). The 1993 team finished the season with a 25–0 record after winning the Group II title, in the program's second finals appearance, with a 9–2 win against Jefferson Township in the championship game played at Trenton State College. NJ.com / The Star-Ledger ranked Pennsville as their number-one softball team in the state in 1993. The team won the 2008 South Jersey, Group I sectional title by a score of 10–0 in the final game against Gloucester Township Technical High School. The team won the Group I championship, defeating Florence Township Memorial High School 9–1 in the semifinals and taking the title with an 8–2 win over High Tech High School in the finals.

In 2001, the girls' soccer team won the South Jersey Group I state sectional championship with a 4–0 win over Bordentown Regional High School. The girls went on to defeat Spotswood High School by a score of 6–0 in the state semi-final but lost to Glen Ridge High School 3–1 in the Group I state final as the only South Jersey team to reach a title game that year. In 2002, the team repeated as South Jersey Group I state sectional champions by defeating Riverside High School by a score of 3–2. The team made it back to the state final by defeating Shore Regional High School 2–1 in the state semi-final played at Old Bridge. The girls tied for the Group I state title with a 1–1 draw against Glen Rock High School in the final played at The College of New Jersey, finishing the season as co-champion with an 18–1–1 record. In 2007, the girls soccer team won the South Jersey, Group I state sectional championship with a 4–3 win over Palmyra High School in the tournament final.

The girls tennis team won the Group I state championship in 2005 (defeating Cresskill High School in the tournament's final match), 2011 (vs. Leonia High School) and 2012 (vs. Glen Ridge High School). In 2007, the girls' tennis team won the South Jersey, Group I state sectional championship with a 3½-1½ win over Salem High School in the tournament final. The 2008 girls tennis team repeated as champion in the South Jersey, Group I section with a 5–0 win over Arthur P. Schalick High School. The team lost to New Providence High School 3–2 in the semifinals of the Group I state tournament.

The boys cross country running team won the Group I state championship in 2006.

== Marching band ==
The Pennsville Pep Band is under the direction of Matt Martin and performs at various activities including football games, basketball games, etc. The pep band replaced the "Pennsville Marching Band" which was discontinued in 2009, and has since been reinstated as of the 2017–2018 school year.

Past Marching Band accomplishments:

- 2006 Group 1A All state championships - "High Percussion, Guard, & Visual"
- 2005 Group 1A All state championships - "High Guard"
- 2005 Yamaha Cup Championship In Baltimore, MD - 1st Place
- 2004 Group 1A All state championships - "High Guard"
- 1982–1986 Tournament of Bands - Chapter One Champions
- 1981–1982 EMBA Championships—Grand Champions

== Class offerings ==
Pennsville Memorial High School course selection includes the selection of many Spanish classes. Spanish 3 is an honors course offered junior and senior year for those who had Spanish 1 and 2. Spanish 4/AP is offered exclusively at senior year for those that had taken Spanish 1, 2, and Spanish 3 honors. Art Fundamentals and Advanced Art can be taken all four years. Journalism 1–3. Game & Web Design classes are given as options. Accounting can be taken all four years, thus there's accounting 1, 2, 3, and 4. Advanced music can be taken all four years, thus there's advanced music 1, 2, 3, 4. AP music theory can be taking during senior year.

Academic classes are offered, along with electives. This includes English honors 9–12 and AP at senior year, history honors 9–12 and AP at junior or senior year, science honors 10–12 and AP at junior or senior year, math honors at 9–12 and AP at junior or senior year for pre-calculus and calculus exclusively at senior year. In order to graduate, students need three years of math, one year of algebra 1, one year of geometry, and one year of algebra 2/trigonometry, three years of history, one year of world history, and one year of US history 1 and 2, three years of science, one year physical/earth science, one year of biology, and one year of environmental science or chemistry. Four years of English are required to graduate. Students can choose to go beyond their requirements and take a fourth year of math, science, and history.

Gym class is given to students in grades 9–12 as it is a prerequisite to have PE all four years in order to graduate.

Pennsville also has a share-time option with Salem County Career and Technical High School. Seniors attend classes at Pennsville in the morning and go to Vo-Tech in the afternoon.

== Salem Community College dual-credit program ==
Students who have a minimum 85 GPA and applicants who have earned 80 credits at the completion of their sophomore year and 115 credits at the completion of their junior year are eligible for consideration to participate in a program to attend Salem Community College to get credits before graduating high school. Students in 11th and 12th grades may attend fall semester classes or spring semester classes.

== Administration ==
The school's principal is Matthew McFarland. Core members of the school's administration include the assistant principal and athletic director.

== Notable alumni ==
- Gene Foster (born 1942), former NFL player for the San Diego Chargers
- Ritch Shydner (born 1952), stand-up comedian, comic writer, and actor
- Chris Widger (born 1971), former MLB player for the Seattle Mariners, Montreal Expos, New York Yankees, St. Louis Cardinals, Chicago White Sox and Baltimore Orioles (2006).
- Mike Widger (1948– 2016), professional football linebacker who played in the Canadian Football League for the Montreal Alouettes and Ottawa Rough Riders
- Norm Willey (1927–2011), defensive lineman for the Philadelphia Eagles who returned to the high school after his NFL career to coach the school's football team.
