= Glen Rock High School =

High school in Bergen County, New Jersey, US

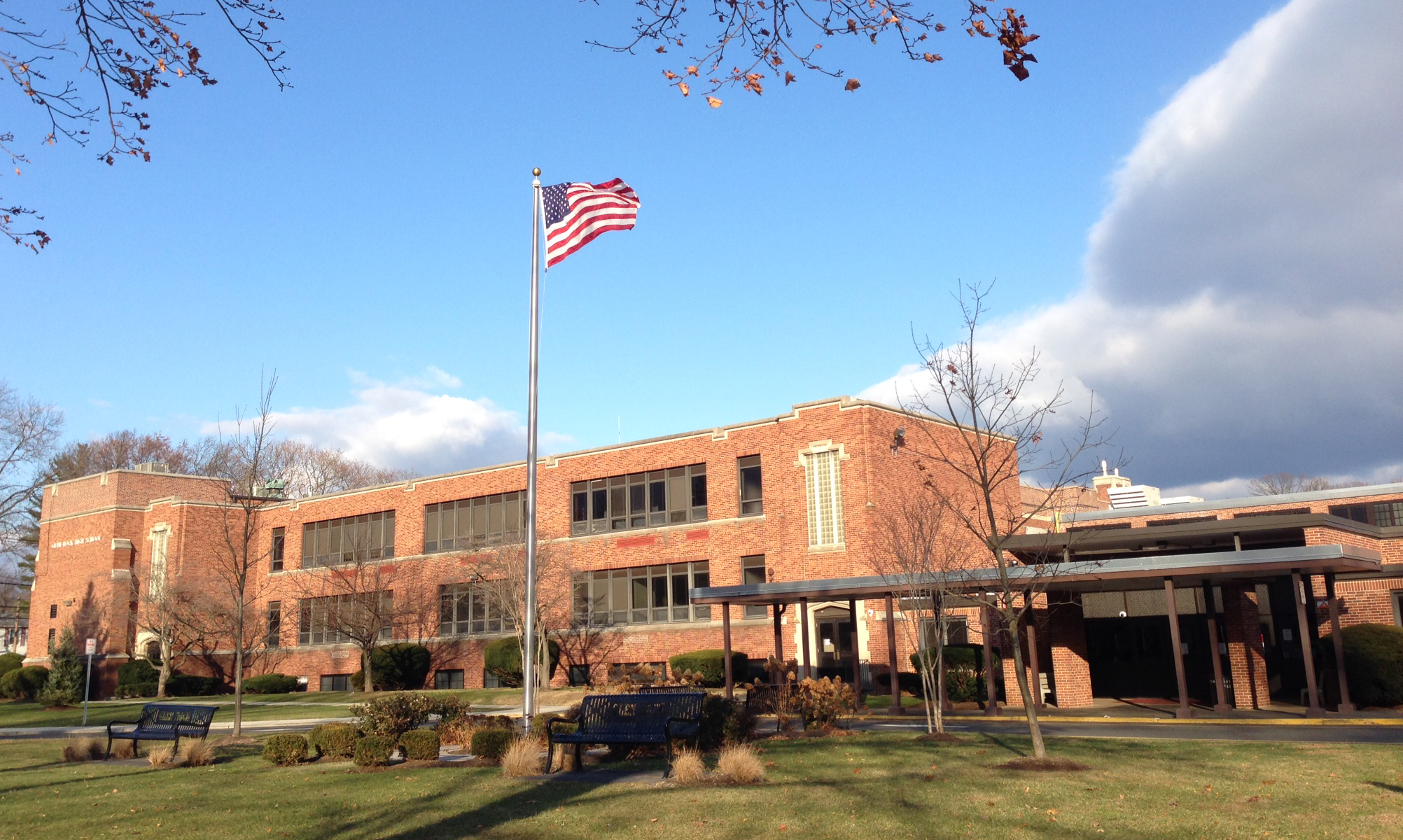

Location
- 400 Hamilton Avenue; Glen Rock, Bergen County, New Jersey 07452; United States; 40.955641°N 74.123017°W

Information
- Type: Public high school
- Motto: In scientia vis ("Power in knowledge")
- Established: September 1956
- School district: Glen Rock Public Schools
- NCES School ID: 340597000484
- Principal: Michelle Giurlando
- Faculty: 72.0 FTEs
- Grades: 9-12
- Enrollment: 722 (as of 2024–25)
- Student to teacher ratio: 10.0:1
- Colors: Red; White; Black
- Athletics conference: North Jersey Interscholastic Conference
- Team name: Panthers
- Newspaper: The Glen Echo
- Yearbook: Glenconian
- Website: mshs.glenrocknj.org

Glen Rock High School is a four-year comprehensive public high school serving students in ninth through twelfth grades from Glen Rock, New Jersey, United States, operating as the lone secondary school of the Glen Rock Public Schools. The school shares a campus with Glen Rock Middle School.

As of the 2024–25 school year, the school had an enrollment of 722 students and 72.0 classroom teachers (on an FTE basis), for a student–teacher ratio of 10.0:1. There were 4 students (0.6% of enrollment) eligible for free lunch and none eligible for reduced-cost lunch.

== History ==
Proposals for a junior-senior high school in the borough date back to 1935, with a referendum for a $460,000 project (equivalent to $10,800,000 in 2025) that would be covered in part through savings in the tuition being paid for students to attend Ridgewood High School.

By 1947, the district was expending a quarter of its budget on payments for high school tuition, but the district was notified by the Ridgewood Public Schools in March 1952 that Glen Rock students, who had attended high school for grades 10–12 in Ridgewood from the time the borough was established, could not be accommodated any longer after the 1954-55 school year. The school opened in September 1956 with only tenth graders, as ninth-grade students were in the junior high school and those in eleventh and twelfth grades completed their education through graduation at Ridgewood High School.

Starting in 2009 and completed in 2011, Glen Rock High School underwent a $45.3 million renovation project that included a new science wing, a creative arts department, and system updates.

== Awards, recognition and rankings ==
The school was one of 18 schools statewide (and three public high schools) honored in 2018 by the National Blue Ribbon Schools Program by the United States Department of Education.

In its listing of "America's Best High Schools 2016," the school was ranked 137th out of 500 best high schools in the country; it was ranked 25th among all high schools in New Jersey and 12th among the state's non-magnet schools. In its 2013 report on "America's Best High Schools," The Daily Beast ranked the school 218th in the nation among participating public high schools and 17th overall (tenth of non-magnet schools) in New Jersey. Glen Rock was ranked 30th in New Jersey and 287th nationwide in Newsweek magazine's 2012 issue of "America's Best High Schools." In the 2012 "Ranking America's Best High Schools" issue by The Washington Post, the school was ranked 40th in New Jersey and 1,028th nationwide. In the 2011 "Ranking America's High Schools" issue by The Washington Post, the school was ranked 31st in New Jersey and 1,070th nationwide. Glen Rock was ranked 874th, the 24th-highest in New Jersey, in Newsweek magazine's 2010 rankings of America's Best High Schools. In Newsweek's May 22, 2007, issue, ranking the country's top high schools, Glen Rock High School was listed in 964th place, the 28th-highest ranked school in New Jersey. The school was ranked as number 614 in the April 30, 2006, issue, the 18th highest ranked school in New Jersey.

The school was the 2nd-ranked public high school in New Jersey out of 305 schools statewide in New Jersey Monthly magazine's September 2018 cover story on the state's "Top Public High Schools," using a new ranking methodology. The school had been ranked 4th in the state of 328 schools in 2012, after being ranked 28th in 2010 out of 322 schools listed. The magazine ranked the school 28th in 2008 out of 316 schools. The school was ranked 6th in the magazine's September 2006 issue, which included 316 schools across the state. Schooldigger.com ranked the school tied for 31st out of 381 public high schools statewide in its 2011 rankings (an increase of 7 positions from the 2010 ranking), which were based on the combined percentage of students classified as proficient or above proficient on the mathematics (93.5%) and language arts literacy (98.5%) components of the High School Proficiency Assessment (HSPA).

== Publications ==
Led by faculty adviser Jason Toncic, the school newspaper, The Glen Echo, transitioned from a print newspaper to an online newspaper in 2012.

== Athletics ==
The Glen Rock High School Panthers participate in the North Jersey Interscholastic Conference, which is comprised of small-enrollment schools in Bergen, Hudson, Morris and Passaic counties. Prior to the sports league realignment that took effect in the fall of 2010, Glen Rock was a member of the smaller Bergen-Passaic Scholastic League (BPSL). With 560 students in grades 10–12, the school was classified by the NJSIAA for the 2019–20 school year as Group II for most athletic competition purposes, which included schools with an enrollment of 486 to 758 students in that grade range. The school was classified by the NJSIAA as Group II North for football for 2024–2026, which included schools with 484 to 683 students.

- Glen Rock is one of the smallest high schools in New Jersey to support ice hockey and lacrosse programs. Because the NJIC does not offer competition in these sports, Glen Rock is a member of the Big North Conference for hockey and competes in lacrosse-specific leagues for both boys' and girls' lacrosse. The ice hockey team specifically has won four consecutive Big North Silver/Freedom championships (2013–16), making the semi-finals of the Public B state tournament twice (2012, 2015) and making the championship in 2016, before winning their first state title in 2017 with an 8–1 victory over Wall High School.
- The football team won the North I Group I state sectional championship in 1980, 1996, and 1998–2002, and won the North I Group II title in 1988. The five consecutive state championships won from 1998 to 2002 are one short of the state record. Down 21–7 at the half, the 1988 team pulled ahead to defeat Park Ridge High School by a score of 22–21 to win the North I Group I championship game. The 1988 team finished the season with a 10–1 record after winning the North I Group II title with a 17–10 victory against a Mahwah High School team that had been unbeaten going into the championship game. The team won the 2001 North I, Group I state sectional championship with a 22–14 win in double overtime in the tournament final against Cresskill High School. The team won its fifth consecutive sectional championship with a 41–0 win against Henry P. Becton Regional High School in 2002.
- The girls soccer team has won the Group I/II title in 1984 (defeating Delran High School in the tournament final), won the Group I title in 1986 (vs. Bordentown Regional High School), 1987 (vs. Bordentown), 1996 (co-champion with Pingry School), 1999 (vs. Rumson-Fair Haven Regional High School), 2002 (co-champion with Pennsville Memorial High School) and 2003 (co-champion with New Providence High School), and won the Group II title in 1989 (as co-champion with Cinnaminson High School), 1995 (as co-champion with Moorestown High School), 1997 (co-champion with Gloucester Catholic High School), 2012; The 11 titles won by the program are the third-most of any public school in the state. The 1999 team finished the season with a 21-1-1 record after defeating Rumson-Fair Haven Regional High School by a score of 2–0 to win the Group I state championship. In 2012, the girls soccer team won the North I, Group II state sectional final with a 1–0 win against Ramsey High School. They went on to win the Group II state title with a 4–0 win against Bordentown Regional High School.
- The girls spring / outdoor track and field team won the Group II state championship in 1994, and won the Group I title in 1995, 1997 and 2000–2003; The program's seven state titles are tied for fifth-most in New Jersey.
- The wrestling won the North I Group I sectional title in 1999 and 2000.
- The baseball team won the Group II state title in 1999 vs. Riverside High School.
- The boys tennis team won the Group I state title in 2000, defeating Mountain Lakes High School in the finals.
- The girls tennis team won the Group I title in 2000 vs. Pitman High School and 2001 vs. Mountain Lakes High School. The girls tennis team took the North I, Group I sectional title in 1999 with a 4–1 win vs. Henry P. Becton Regional High School in the tournament finals.
- The boys spring / outdoor track and field won the Group I title in 2003 and 2004.
- The ice hockey team won the Public B state championship in 2017 with an 8–1 win in the tournament finals at the Mennen Arena against Wall High School to run their season record to 22-3-3. The team won the McInnis Cup in 2021 with a 4–0 win against Livingston High School in the championship game.

== Administration ==
Since 2023, the principal of both Glen Rock High School and Glen Rock Middle School is Michelle Giurlando. Her administration team includes the high school and middle school assistant principals.

== Notable alumni ==
- Corinne May Botz (born 1977, class of 1995), visual artist and educator
- Keith Cardona (born 1992), goalkeeper who played for the Indy Eleven of the North American Soccer League
- Daniel Flaherty (born 1993), actor, known for his role as Stanley Lucerne on the MTV television teen drama Skins
- Bud Hedinger (born 1947), talk radio host in the Orlando, Florida area on station WFLA AM 540 (WFLF)
- Paul Melicharek, professional football player for the Green Bay Blizzard of the Indoor Football League
- Robert J. Motzer (class of 1977), genitourinary medical oncologist
- Samuel Petrone (born 1989), professional soccer player who plays for Swedish football club, Mjällby AIF
- Warren Ruggiero (born 1966), American football coach who is offensive coordinator for Wake Forest
- Julie Spira, author and media personality on the subjects of online dating, social media, mobile dating and netiquette
- Paul Stekler (born 1953, class of 1970), political documentary filmmaker and former chair and head of the production program in the Department of Radio-Television-Film at the University of Texas at Austin
- Patrick Stickles (born 1985, class of 2004), singer, guitarist, and songwriter of the band Titus Andronicus
- Charlie Tahan (born 1998, class of 2016), actor, known for his roles in Ozark, Frankenweenie, I Am Legend and Charlie St. Cloud
- Floyd Vivino (1951–2026), star of The Uncle Floyd Show
- Jerry Vivino (born 1954, class of 1972), musician
- Jimmy Vivino (born 1955, class of 1973), musician
- Will Wood (class of 2011), visual artist and musician
