= Julie Spira =

American writer

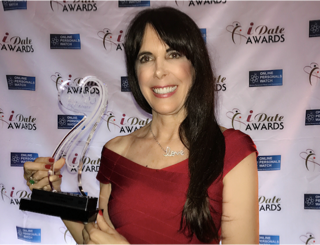
- Julie Spira
- Citizenship: United States
- Education: Ithaca College
- Occupations: Author, media personality
- Awards: WOW (2010) iDate - Best Dating Coach (2017)
- Website: www.juliespira.com

Julie Spira is an American author, online dating expert, media personality, and digital matchmaker who has written about the intersection of love and technology for numerous publications. Her work focuses on online dating, mobile dating, relationships, technology, social media, and netiquette.

== Early life ==
Spira was raised in Glen Rock, New Jersey and attended Glen Rock High School. She graduated from the Park School of Communications at Ithaca College in Ithaca, New York, where she received a B.S. in Television-Radio.

== Career ==
=== Broadcasting and technology ===
While attending Ithaca College, Spira, then known as Julie Evans, became the first female on-air personality and voice-over talent at WAAL-FM in Binghamton, NY.

Spira later worked for RKO Radio Networks, the first commercial radio network in the United States to distribute its programming entirely by satellite, as manager of affiliate relations in New York City. After relocating to Los Angeles, she opened RKO’s West Coast affiliate office and was promoted to director of affiliate relations.

Spira has continued to work in technology throughout her career. As executive vice president of sales for Interpacket Networks, she was involved in marketing the company’s high-speed Internet services delivered via satellite to more than 100 countries.

=== Online dating and digital matchmaking ===
While working as a technology executive and as an early adopter of the Internet, Spira became a charter member of Love@AOL in 1994. She later began coaching singles and writing online dating profiles.

Spira became known in the media as an online dating expert. She is also a certified dating and relationship coach through the Matchmaking Institute.

Spira appeared on NPR's All Things Considered as a mobile dating expert in a report about the development of computer and mobile dating. Her Mobile Dating BootCamp was featured by The Washington Post in coverage of the growth of mobile dating apps, and The New York Times interviewed her about Tinder and mobile dating.

In 2015, Spira appeared as an online dating coach in the Vice Media documentary The Mobile Love Industry.

In 2021, she appeared on Good Morning America to discuss Tinder’s introduction of background checks and was interviewed by Today about dating trends involving older women and younger men.

Spira’s book The Perils of Cyber-Dating: Confessions of a Hopeful Romantic Looking for Love Online was published by Morgan James Publishing in 2009. The memoir recounts her experiences with online dating and includes dating advice for singles.

In 2016, The Perils of Cyber-Dating was re-released in a revised and updated edition that included new dating advice and a new epilogue. A revised audiobook edition narrated by Spira was also released in 2016.

=== Social media and netiquette ===
Spira has written and spoken about social-media behavior, digital communication, and netiquette. Her Rules of Netiquette project focused on etiquette and interpersonal behavior on social media and other digital platforms.

Woman’s Day cited Spira's advice on social-media etiquettei, and Hallmark Channel’s Home & Family featured her in a segment devoted to netiquette and managing a digital footprint.

In 2012, Spira wrote about 'Social Media Anxiety Disorder' in a HuffPost article titled 'Do You Suffer from Social Media Anxiety Disorder?' in which she identified five signs of SMAD. Digital Trends later credited her with coining the term.

=== Politics and dating ===
Spira developed Love in the Age of Trump: How Politics Is Polarizing Relationships, a project examining the effect of political polarization on dating and relationships.

DatingNews reported in 2018 that Spira had spent nearly two years examining how political views affected dating and was working on Love in the Age of Trump. The publication reported that she interviewed more than 100 singles and couples about the role politics played in their relationships.

=== Recent media ===
In October 2025, Spira was interviewed by NBC Los Angeles about dating-app safety following reports of alleged burglaries involving people met through dating apps.

In November 2025, she appeared on NBC Palm Springs to discuss holiday dating, cuffing season, and online dating strategies.

In February 2026, Spira appeared on ABC News Live to discuss the use of dating apps for professional networking and career connections.

=== Artificial intelligence and dating ===
In 2026, Spira began publishing an ongoing series titled ' Dating in an AI World, examining artificial intelligence in dating, matchmaking, messaging, safety, and relationships. Spira was also interviewed by KESQ about the increasing use of artificial intelligence in dating apps, including AI matchmaking, profile assistance, and messaging tools.

=== Community leadership ===
Spira has been involved in civic and philanthropic organizations in Southern California. She previously served on the board of directors of the Costume Council of the Los Angeles County Museum of Art and on the board of Jewish Big Brothers Big Sisters of Los Angeles. She currently serves as Membership Chair of the McCallum Theatre Muses & Patroness Circle and as a member of the Leadership Coachella Valley Alumni Council.

== Publications ==
- The Perils of Cyber-Dating: Confessions of a Hopeful Romantic Looking for Love Online (2009; revised edition 2016)

== Awards ==
In 2010, Spira received the Wonderful Outstanding Woman or WOW award from the Jewish Big Brothers, Big Sisters of Los Angeles, for her philanthropic work in the Los Angeles community.

In 2017, Spira was awarded "Best Dating Coach of the Year" at the iDate Awards.
