= John Houghtaling =

American inventor (1916–2009)

John Joseph Houghtaling (Note: Pronounced /ˈhʌfteɪlɪŋ/ HUFF-tay-ling) (November 14, 1916 – June 17, 2009) was an American entrepreneur and inventor who in 1958 invented the Magic Fingers Vibrating Bed, a common feature in mid-priced hotels and motels from the 1960s to the early 1980s.

== Early life ==
Houghtaling was born in Kansas City, Missouri, on November 14, 1916. His father worked for a telegraph company as a lineman, which led Houghtaling and his two sisters to move around the Midwestern United States with their family several times. He served as a gunnery instructor in the United States Army and was sent to England in April 1942 during World War II, where he flew 20 missions on Boeing B-17 Flying Fortress bombers with the 452d Bombardment Squadron of the United States Army Air Forces.

He worked in a series of jobs following the completion of his military service, including as a hotel bellman, cookware salesman and a salesman of a remote-control lawnmower.

== Magic Fingers ==
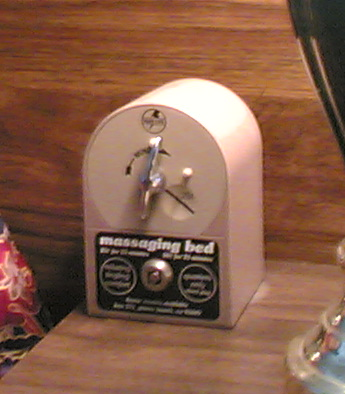
A Magic Fingers coin acceptor on a bedside table.

In the 1950s, Houghtaling was still working as a salesman, this time selling vibrating beds in which the vibrating motor and bed were sold as a single unit that was clumsy, expensive, and prone to failure. At a service call for a broken unit, Houghtaling realized that the vibrating motor was the essential component, not the bed, and that a unit could be developed that would attach to any bed, not just the combination vibrating bed units he was selling. Houghtaling worked in the basement of his home in Glen Rock, New Jersey, and tested hundreds of motors before finding one that weighed relatively little, could be attached to the box springs of an existing bed, and would provide the right level of vibration. Once a quarter was inserted into the attached coin meter, the motor would vibrate the bed for 15 minutes. The coin mechanisms were modeled on similar devices that had been attached to radios and televisions in hotels. The devices were sold through franchisees who installed the units in hotels based on an arrangement in which revenues would be split, with $1 million in annual sales of the units. There were 250,000 Magic Fingers units installed nationwide at their peak of popularity in the 1960s, with each unit averaging eight quarters per week, bringing in $2 million in monthly gross revenue.

By the last half of the 1970s, more than a million Magic Fingers units had been installed in American and European hotels and houses. The devices started to seem out of date and somewhat sleazy, because of the bed's association with seedy motels, and their popularity declined starting in the 1980s as other in-room entertainment options became available and theft of money from the coin boxes started to become more common. Houghtaling sold the rights to the Magic Fingers name after he retired in the 1980s, with the new owner manufacturing units for home use at the time of his death in 2009. Though the devices are rarely seen in the 21st century, they were still available in motels in the Western United States at the time of his death.

== Trivia ==
The vibrating bed was frequently featured in 1960s–1980s movies and TV shows. "Magic fingers" is a song by Frank Zappa on the soundtrack to 200 Motels. It was mentioned by name in songwriter Steve Goodman's "This Hotel Room", sung by Jimmy Buffett, which included the line "Put in a quarter / Turn out the light / Magic Fingers makes you feel all right." and is also mentioned in Buck Owens's "World Famous Paradise Inn." Kurt Vonnegut's Slaughterhouse Five also referred to Houghtaling's Magic Fingers; the protagonist Billy Pilgrim used the vibrating bed to help him fall asleep. Magic Fingers was also seen in the 1997 film Lolita, the 1998 Clay Pigeons, and the episode of CSI Vegas "Assume Nothing" (season 4, episode 1). In the classic 1983 National Lampoon film Vacation, Clark and Ellen Griswold can be seen relaxing on a Magic Fingers bed that goes rogue, vibrating excessively and forcing them onto the floor. In the X-Files episode Bad Blood (Season 5, episode 12) Dana Scully used one in a Texas motel, before being interrupted by Mulder, telling her that she had to go perform an autopsy at that moment. She complained "but I just put money in the Magic Fingers." It has been referenced twice in The Simpsons, once as a couch gag and once in the episode "The Cartridge Family" in which Marge takes the kids to the Sleep Eazy (the neon sign is partially burned out to read "Sleazy") Hotel; Bart and Lisa turn on the Magic Fingers and race their vibrating beds across the hotel room. It was also featured several times in the TV show Supernatural. Dean is very fond of the magic fingers as seen in season 2 ep 13. It has also been featured in S5:E17 (The Death of the Queen Bee) of US TV series Bones. The Magic Fingers is mentioned in the third season of The Wire, as well as the season 3 episode, “Hank’s Cowboy Movie” of King of The Hill.

== Personal life ==
Houghtaling died aged 92 on June 17, 2009, at his Fort Pierce, Florida, home due to complications from a fall that resulted in a stroke. His first marriage ended in divorce and his second wife predeceased him. He had five children and five grandchildren.
