= Samuel Petrone =

American soccer player

Personal information
- Full name: Samuel Petrone
- Date of birth: 6 July 1989 (age 37)
- Place of birth: Glen Rock, New Jersey, U.S.
- Height: 1.76 m (5 ft 9 in)
- Position: Forward

Youth career
- Arsenal World Class New Jersey
- 2007: Clemson Tigers
- 2008–2010: Seton Hall Pirates

Senior career*
Years	Team	Apps	(Gls)
2010	New Jersey Rangers	10	(1)
2011–2013	Mjällby AIF	4	(0)
2012	→ Leiknir (loan)	9	(1)
2013	→ Husqvarna FF (loan)	9	(1)
2014	Rochester Rhinos	9	(1)
- * Club domestic league appearances and goals as of June 18, 2015

Samuel Grover Petrone (born 6 July 1989) is an American former soccer player who played as a forward.

== College and amateur ==
After graduating from Glen Rock High School in New Jersey, Petrone began his college career at Clemson University in 2007. However, he transferred to Seton Hall University in 2008 after he made only six appearances with Clemson. In 2008, Petrone made 18 appearances and led the Pirates with nine goals and 21 points. In 2009, he made 15 appearances and came away with one goal. In 2010, Petrone made only 9 appearances for Seton Hall.

Petrone also played for the New Jersey Rangers in the USL Premier Development League.

== Professional ==
On February 24, 2011, Petrone joined Swedish club Mjällby AIF. He made his professional debut for the club on April 3, 2011, in a 1–0 loss to Helsingborgs IF. On 26 July 2012, he signed for Icelandic 1. deild karla club Leiknir on loan until the end of the season. He went on to play nine matches for the club, scoring his only goal for Leiknir in his penultimate appearance in the 3–2 away win against Höttur.

Petrone returned to the United States on January 30, 2014, signing with USL Pro club Rochester Rhinos.
