= Corinne May Botz =

American visual artist

- Born: 1977 (age 48–49); Ridgewood, New Jersey
- Education: BFA, Maryland Institute College of Art; MFA, Milton Avery Graduate School of the Arts

Corinne May Botz (born 1977) is an American visual artist and educator whose practice encompasses photography, writing, and filmmaking. Her work, which has focused on space, gender and the body, includes The Nutshell Studies of Unexplained Death (Monacelli Press, 2004), Haunted Houses (Random House/Monacelli Press, 2010), and the award-winning short documentaries Bedside Manner (2016) and Milk Factory (2021). Penelope Green wrote in a feature story for The New York Times, “[Botz’s] photographic work reads like a DSM of contemporary American life and the dark side of domesticity.”

== Early life and education ==
Botz was born in Ridgewood, New Jersey. When Botz was a preteenager in Glen Rock, New Jersey, she and her two sisters appeared on a segment of Good Morning America as the "bad example" in a story about children's messy bedrooms. She graduated from Glen Rock High School in 1995. Botz earned her Bachelor of Fine Arts from Maryland Institute College of Art and her Master of Fine Arts (MFA) from Milton Avery Graduate School of the Arts, Bard College. For her MFA thesis project, Parameters (2006) at Bard, she photographed and chronicled the homes and possessions of agoraphobics.

== Career ==
Botz is based in Catskill, New York. She is the recipient of multiple artistic residencies and has received grants from New York Foundation for the Arts and the Jerome Foundation. Botz is on the faculty of International Center of Photography and John Jay College of Criminal Justice, City University of New York.

== Publications ==
The Nutshell Studies of Unexplained Death (Monacelli Press, 2004). is a book of photography and prose about the crime scene dioramas created by the amateur criminologist and heiress Frances Glessner Lee. Lucy Sante wrote of the book "The Nutshell dioramas are compelling, a bit disturbing, and engagingly weird—it never previously seemed possible to use the words 'forensic' and 'cute' in the same sentence. Corinne May Botz has done a grand job both in exposing them to a nonspecialist public and in photographing them with such fanatical verisimilitude."

Haunted Houses (Monacelli Press, 2010). is a collection of large-format photographs and accompanying oral narratives from eighty allegedly haunted houses. The series was inspired by turn of the century spirit photographs and Victorian ghost stories written by women as a means of articulating domestic discontents. By presenting images of empty spaces, Botz allows viewers to imagine the invisible.

== Video work ==
Bedside Manner (2016) focuses on real-life standardized patient simulations to explore the performative aspect of doctor-patient encounters and issues concerning empathy. The film features the neurologist and author Alice Flaherty, as her role shifts from standardized patient to real patient to doctor. It won the 2016 Grand Jury Prize for Best Short, DOC NYC, Oscar-qualifying.

Milk Factory (2021), is a photography and video project that looks at the labor involved in infant care. The video was filmed primarily in the bipartisan lactation room of the US House of Representatives, the very place where laws are decided regarding parental policies and reproductive rights. The project was released during the COVID pandemic, during which the inadequacy of support for working mothers created a worldwide crisis. It won first prize in Pictures of the Year International, Documentary Daily Life Category.
