= Glen Rock Public Schools =

Public school district in Glen Rock, New Jersey, United States

Address
- 620 Harristown Road Glen Rock, Bergen County, New Jersey, 07452; United States
- Coordinates: 40.95692°N 74.12127°W

District information
- Grades: K-12
- Superintendent: Brett Charleston
- Business administrator: James Canellas
- Schools: 6

Students and staff
- Enrollment: 2,620 (as of 2022–23)
- Faculty: 222.9 FTEs
- Student–teacher ratio: 11.8:1

Other information
- District Factor Group: J
- Website: www.glenrocknj.org
Ind.	Per pupil	District spending	Rank (*)	K-12 average	%± vs. average
1A	Total Spending	$21,294	63	$18,891	12.7%
1	Budgetary Cost	16,492	62	14,783	11.6%
2	Classroom Instruction	8,871	55	8,763	1.2%
6	Support Services	3,356	64	2,392	40.3%
8	Administrative Cost	1,980	68	1,485	33.3%
10	Operations & Maintenance	1,880	53	1,783	5.4%
13	Extracurricular Activities	402	39	268	50.0%
16	Median Teacher Salary	69,300	58	64,043
Data from NJDoE 2014 Taxpayers' Guide to Education Spending. *Of K-12 districts with 1,800-3,500 students. Lowest spending=1; Highest=68

The Glen Rock Public Schools is a comprehensive community public school district that serves students in kindergarten through twelfth grade from Glen Rock, in Bergen County, in the U.S. state of New Jersey.

As of the 2022–23 school year, the district, comprised of six schools, had an enrollment of 2,620 students and 222.9 classroom teachers (on an FTE basis), for a student–teacher ratio of 11.8:1.

The district is classified by the New Jersey Department of Education as being in District Factor Group "J", the highest of eight groupings. District Factor Groups organize districts statewide to allow comparison by common socioeconomic characteristics of the local districts. From lowest socioeconomic status to highest, the categories are A, B, CD, DE, FG, GH, I and J.

== History ==
The high school underwent a $45.3 million renovation project that started in 2009 and was completed for the 2011-12 school year, which included a new science wing, a creative arts department and system updates.

== Awards and recognition ==
The district's high school was one of 18 schools statewide (and three public high schools) honored in 2018 by the National Blue Ribbon Schools Program by the United States Department of Education. In 2024, Alexander Hamilton Elementary School was one of 11 schools statewide that was recognized as a Blue Ribbon School of Excellence.

The high school was the 4th-ranked public high school in New Jersey out of 328 schools statewide in New Jersey Monthly magazine's September 2012 cover story on the state's "Top Public High Schools", after being ranked 28th in 2010 out of 322 schools listed. In 2012, Newsweek ranked the school 30th in the state; in the Glen Rock High School graduating class of 2012, 98% of students indicated that they would move on to a two-year or four-year college.

== Schools ==
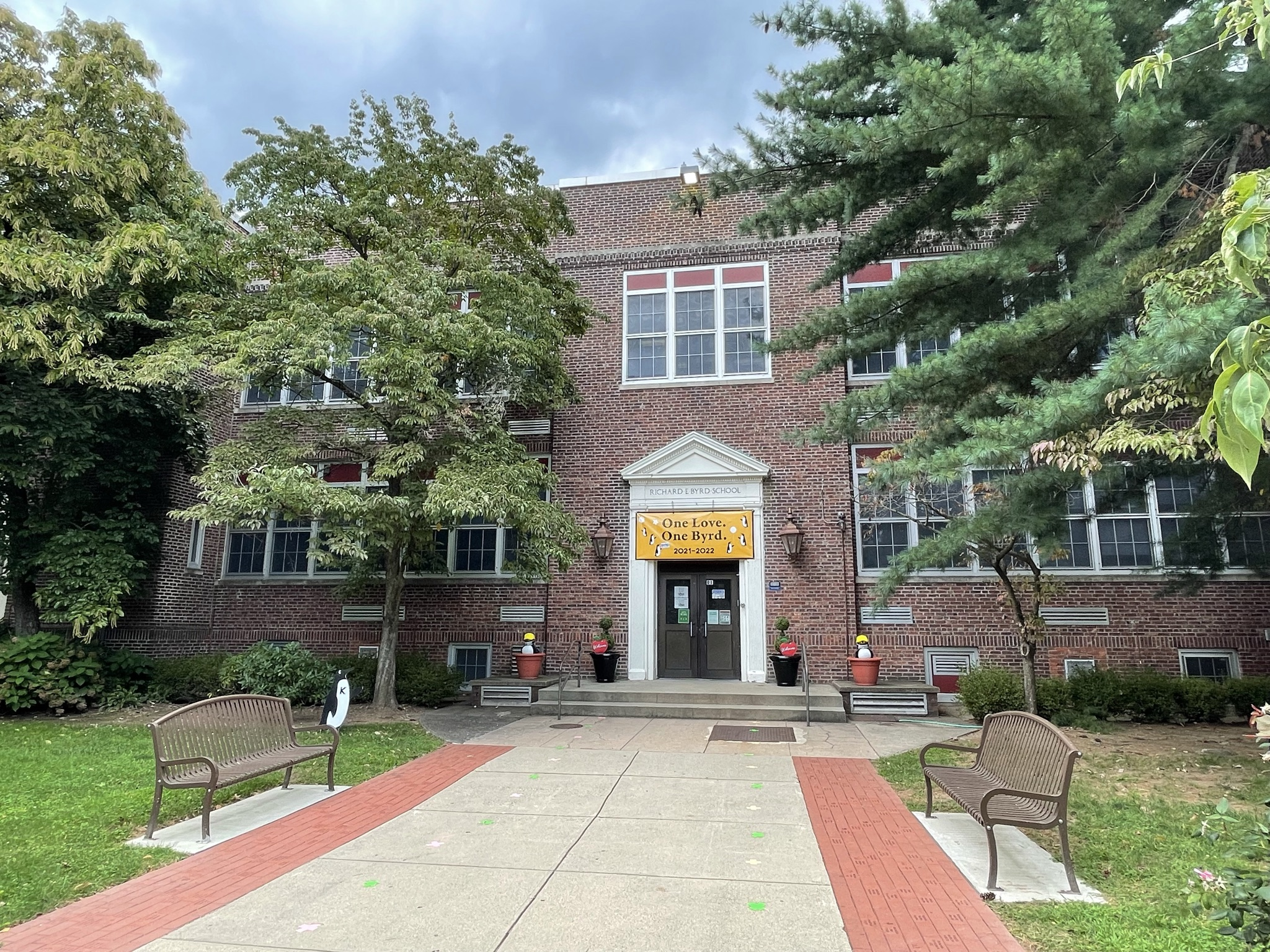
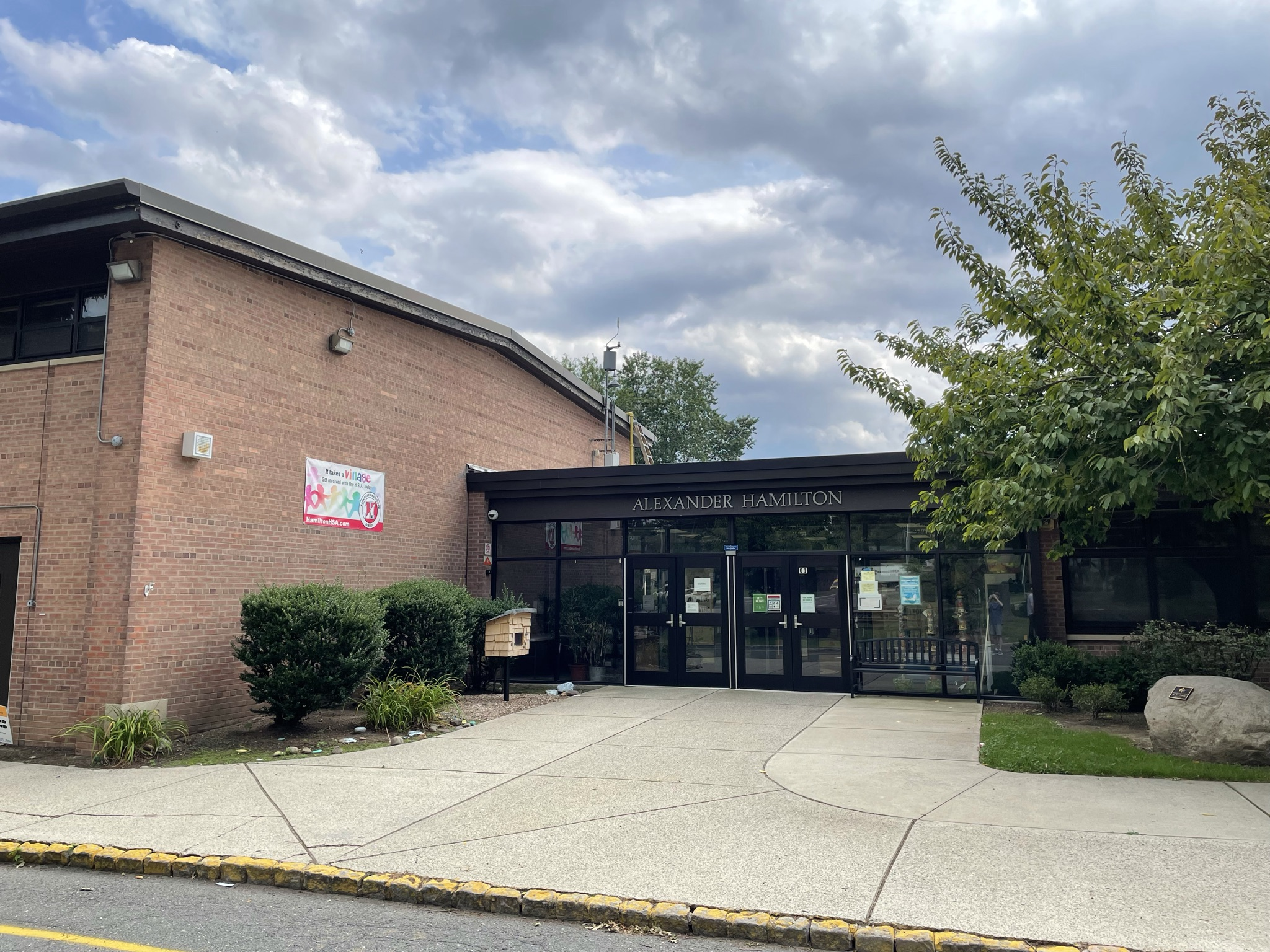
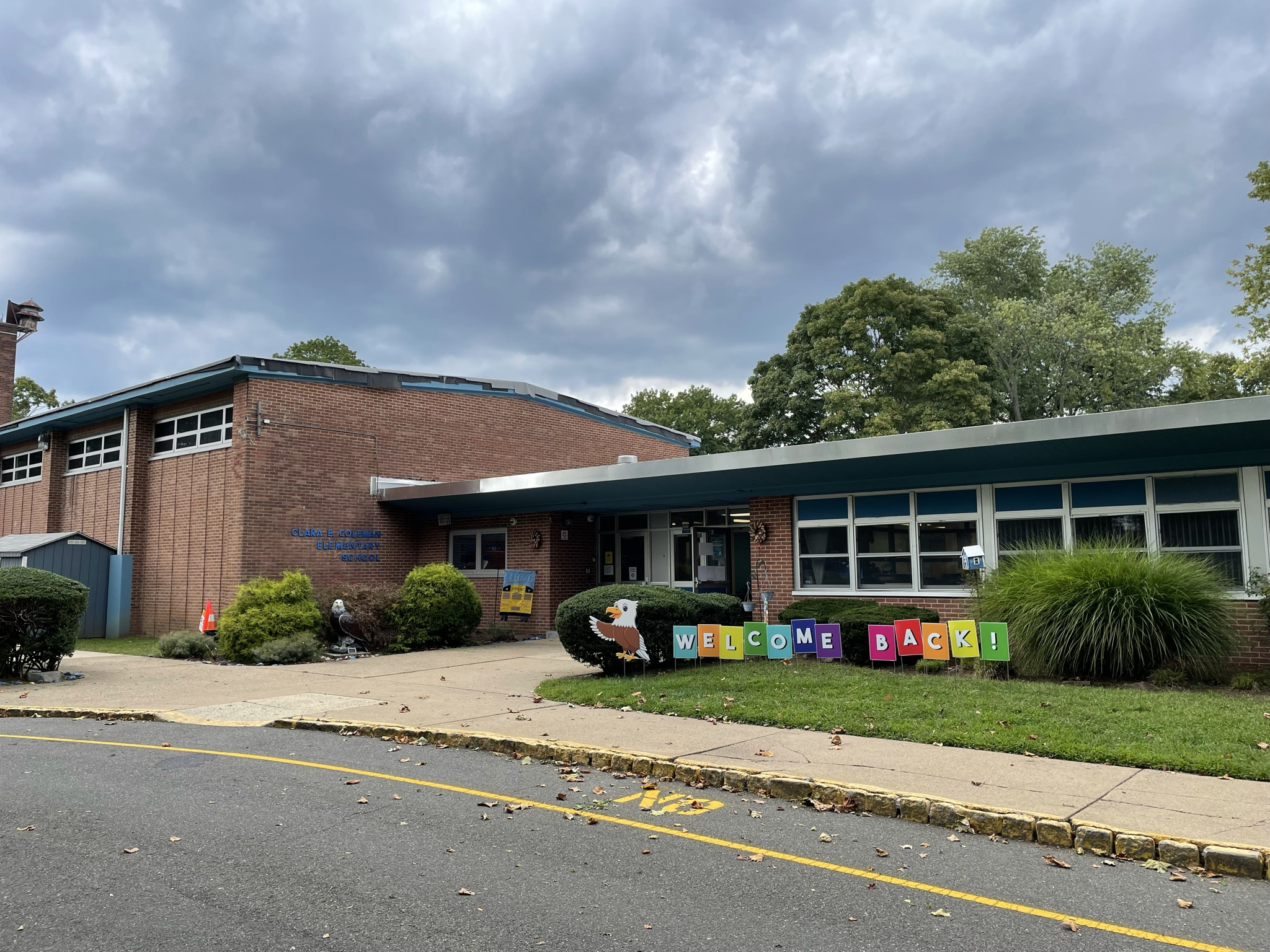
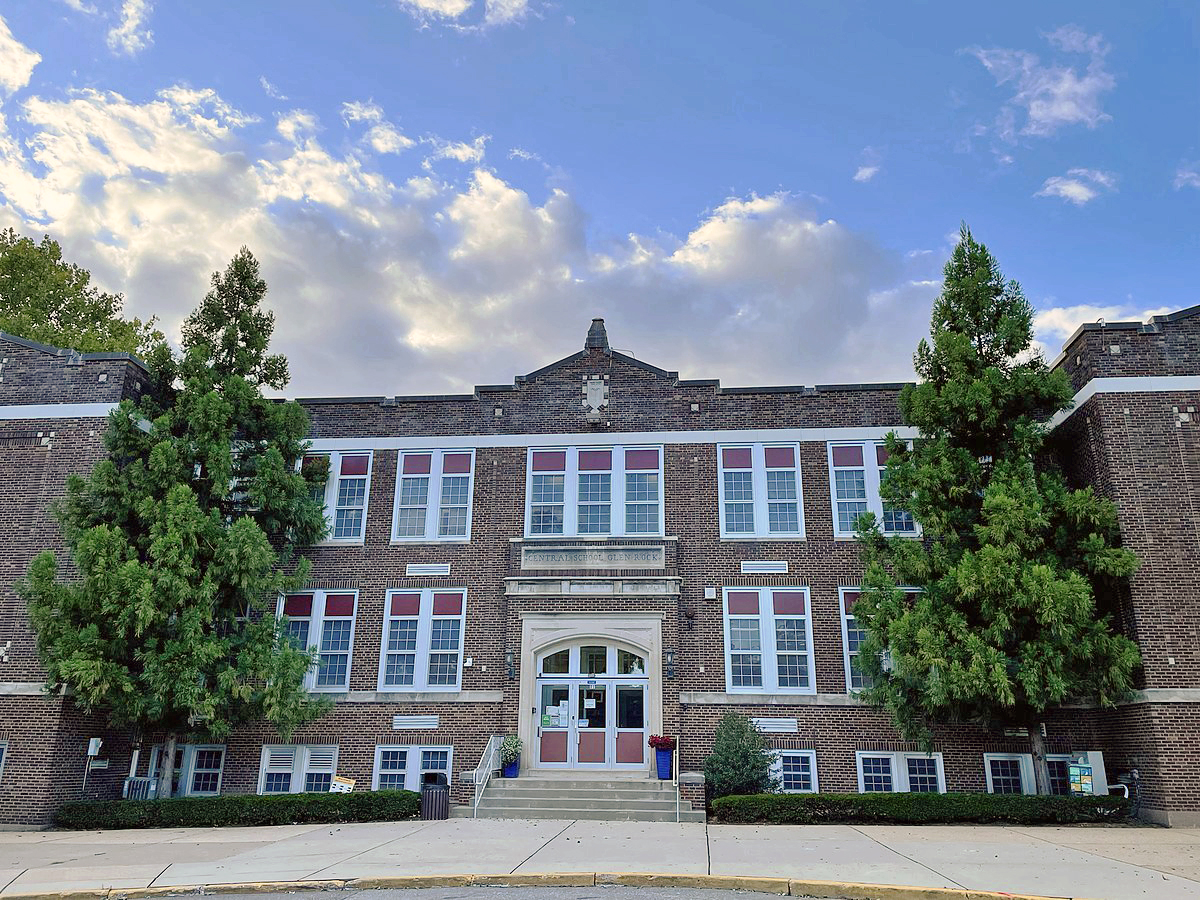
Elementary schools: (clockwise from top left) Richard E. Byrd School, Alexander Hamilton School, Central Elementary School, Clara E. Coleman School

Schools in the district (with 2022–23 enrollment data from the National Center for Education Statistics) are:

Elementary schools

- Richard E. Byrd School with 269 students in grades K–5
  - Jodie Craft, principal
- Central Elementary School with 339 students in grades K–5
  - Krista LaCroix, principal
- Clara E. Coleman School with 351 students in grades K–5
  - Edward Thompson, principal
- Alexander Hamilton Elementary School with 281 students in grades K–5
  - Kristin Gomez, principal

Middle school

- Glen Rock Middle School with 621 students in grades 6–8
  - Michelle Giurlando, principal

High school

- Glen Rock High School with 729 students in grades 9–12
  - Michelle Giurlando, principal

== Administration ==
Core members of the district's administration are:

- Brett Charleston, superintendent of schools
- James Canellas, business administrator

== Board of education ==
The district's board of education, comprised of nine members, sets policy and oversees the fiscal and educational operation of the district through its administration. As a Type II school district, the board's trustees are elected directly by voters to serve three-year terms of office on a staggered basis, with three seats up for election each year held (since 2012) as part of the November general election. The board appoints a superintendent to oversee the district's day-to-day operations and a business administrator to supervise the business functions of the district.
