= Pennsville School District =

School district in Salem County, New Jersey, US

Coordinates: 39.653397°N 75.519102°W

Address
- 30 Church Street Pennsville Township, Salem County, New Jersey, 08070; United States

District information
- Grades: K-12
- Superintendent: Michael Brodzik
- Business administrator: Heather Mayhew
- Schools: 5

Students and staff
- Enrollment: 1,809 (as of 2021–22)
- Faculty: 166.9 FTEs
- Student–teacher ratio: 10.8:1

Other information
- District Factor Group: CD
- Website: www.psdnet.org
Ind.	Per pupil	District spending	Rank (*)	K-12 average	%± vs. average
1A	Total Spending	$17,561	22	$18,891	−7.0%
1	Budgetary Cost	13,712	25	14,783	−7.2%
2	Classroom Instruction	7,819	21	8,763	−10.8%
6	Support Services	2,208	33	2,392	−7.7%
8	Administrative Cost	1,811	35	1,485	22.0%
10	Operations & Maintenance	1,542	22	1,783	−13.5%
13	Extracurricular Activities	333	8	268	24.3%
16	Median Teacher Salary	49,211	1	64,043
Data from NJDoE 2014 Taxpayers' Guide to Education Spending. *Of K-12 districts with up to 1,800 students. Lowest spending=1; Highest=49

The Pennsville School District is a comprehensive community public school district, that serves students in kindergarten through twelfth grade from Pennsville Township, in Salem County, in the U.S. state of New Jersey.

As of the 2021–22 school year, the district, comprised of five schools, had an enrollment of 1,809 students and 166.9 classroom teachers (on an FTE basis), for a student–teacher ratio of 10.8:1.

The district is classified by the New Jersey Department of Education as being in District Factor Group "CD", the sixth-highest of eight groupings. District Factor Groups organize districts statewide to allow comparison by common socioeconomic characteristics of the local districts. From lowest socioeconomic status to highest, the categories are A, B, CD, DE, FG, GH, I and J.

== Awards and recognition ==
Penn Beach Elementary School was recognized by Governor Jim McGreevey in 2003 as one of 25 schools selected statewide for the First Annual Governor's School of Excellence award.

== Schools ==
Schools in the district (with 2020–21 enrollment data from the National Center for Education Statistics) are:

Elementary schools

- Valley Park Elementary School with 340 students in grades preK-1
  - Bobbie-Ann Fordham, principal
- Central Park Elementary School with 237 students in grades 2–3
  - Steven Hindman, principal
- Penn Beach Elementary School with 302 students in grades 4–5
  - Mark Zoppina, principal

Middle school

- Pennsville Middle School with 450 students in grades 6–8
  - Carolyn Carels, principal

High school

- Pennsville Memorial High School with 450 students in grades 9–12
  - Matthew D. McFarland, principal

== Administration ==
Core members of the district's administration are:

- Michael Brodzik, superintendent
- Heather Mayhew, business administrator and board secretary

== Board of education ==
The district's board of education, comprised of nine members, sets policy and oversees the fiscal and educational operation of the district through its administration. As a Type II school district, the board's trustees are elected directly by voters to serve three-year terms of office on a staggered basis, with three seats up for election each year held (since 2012) as part of the November general election. The board appoints a superintendent to oversee the district's day-to-day operations and a business administrator to supervise the business functions of the district.
