= Paul Melicharek =

Profile
- Position: Defensive line

Personal information
- Born: November 16, 1991; Glen Rock, New Jersey
- Died: June 25, 2024 (aged 32)
- Listed height: 5 ft 10 in (1.78 m)
- Listed weight: 245 lb (111 kg)

Career information
- High school: Glen Rock (NJ)
- College: Bridgewater State

Career history
- Green Bay Blizzard (2013–2014); Lehigh Valley Steelhawks (2015)

Awards and highlights
- 3× NEFC All-Star; Beyond Sports Network D-III All-American; Joe Zablinski Award

Paul Melicharek (November 16, 1991 – June 25, 2024) was an American football defensive lineman and coach. He was originally signed as a professional by the Green Bay Blizzard on May 29, 2013 as a free agent.

== College career ==
Melicharek played high school football for Glen Rock High School in Glen Rock, New Jersey. Melicharek led Glen Rock to the 2008 New Jersey State Finals in his senior year. He played college football at Bridgewater State University, a Division 3 college located in Bridgewater, Massachusetts. Melicharek was a 4-year stater for the Bears and was a 3-time All-New England Football League 1st Team All-Star. He led the Bears to a 9-1 record his senior year, and an appearance in the NCAA Division III Tournament, losing in the first round. Melicharek was chosen as a 2012 D3Football.com All-East Region 3rd Team All-Star, and a 2012 Beyond Sports Network D-III Football Honorable All-American his senior year. He was also chosen as the 2012 Joe Zablinski Award by the Greater Boston Gridiron Club, which is given annually to New England's best Division 2 & 3 college football players. Melicharek was also chosen to play in the Aztec Bowl in Monterrey, Mexico, and the All-American Bowl in Minneapolis, Minnesota.

== Professional career ==
Melicharek was not highly regarded as an NFL prospect out of college due to his small size and playing for a Division 3 college. He participated in an NFL Regional Combine in New York/New Jersey, but was not signed by any teams. Melicharek was signed as a free agent by the Green Bay Blizzard of the Indoor Football League on May 29, 2013.

== Post-playing career ==
Melicharek joined the King Philip Regional High School football team in Wrentham, Massachusetts as an assistant coach, working with the defensive line. Melicharek died on June 25, 2024 at the age of 32.
