= Robert J. Motzer =

American oncologist

- Born: Glen Rock, New Jersey, U.S.
- Education: Hope College (BA); University of Michigan Medical School (MD)
- Medical career
- Institutions: Weill Cornell Medicine; Memorial Sloan Kettering Cancer Center
- Sub-specialties: Renal cell carcinoma

Robert John Motzer is an American genitourinary medical oncologist. He is the Jack and Dorothy Byrne Chair in Clinical Oncology at the Memorial Sloan Kettering Cancer Center. He specializes in renal cell carcinoma, germ cell tumors, and immunotherapy.

== Early life and education ==
Motzer was born and raised in Glen Rock, New Jersey and attended Glen Rock High School. He graduated magna cum laude from Hope College with a Bachelor of Arts degree in chemistry in 1977. He then attended the University of Michigan Medical School and completed his residency in internal medicine at Memorial Sloan Kettering Cancer Center and North Shore University Hospital.

== Career ==
Motzer joined the Memorial Sloan Kettering Cancer Center in 1998 as a medical oncologist specialising in both testicular and kidney cancer. In 1999, Motzer developed the MSK Risk System (also known as the Motzer Score), which retrospectively places clinical trial subjects in three prognostic groups. Motzer determined which patients were most likely to have the highest and lowest survival rates based on 5 elements: levels of hemoglobin, calcium, and lactate dehyrogenase; performance status; and the time from diagnosis to systemic treatment. It is considered the most widely recognized prognostic algorithm for RCC.

Motzer also led numerous clinical trials and received Food and Drug Administration (FDA) approval for drugs for targeted therapies. Since 2006, he has served as the lead investigator for the CLEAR clinical trials for sunitinib, an anti-cancer medication. In 2026, following clinical trials led by Motzer, the FDA approved the combination of belzutifan and lenvatinib for patients with RCC.

== Personal life ==
Motzer married Sara Gaylord in August 1977 at Cascade Christian Church. The two had met while attending Hope College.
