= Glen Rock, New Jersey =

Borough in Bergen County, New Jersey, US

- Borough
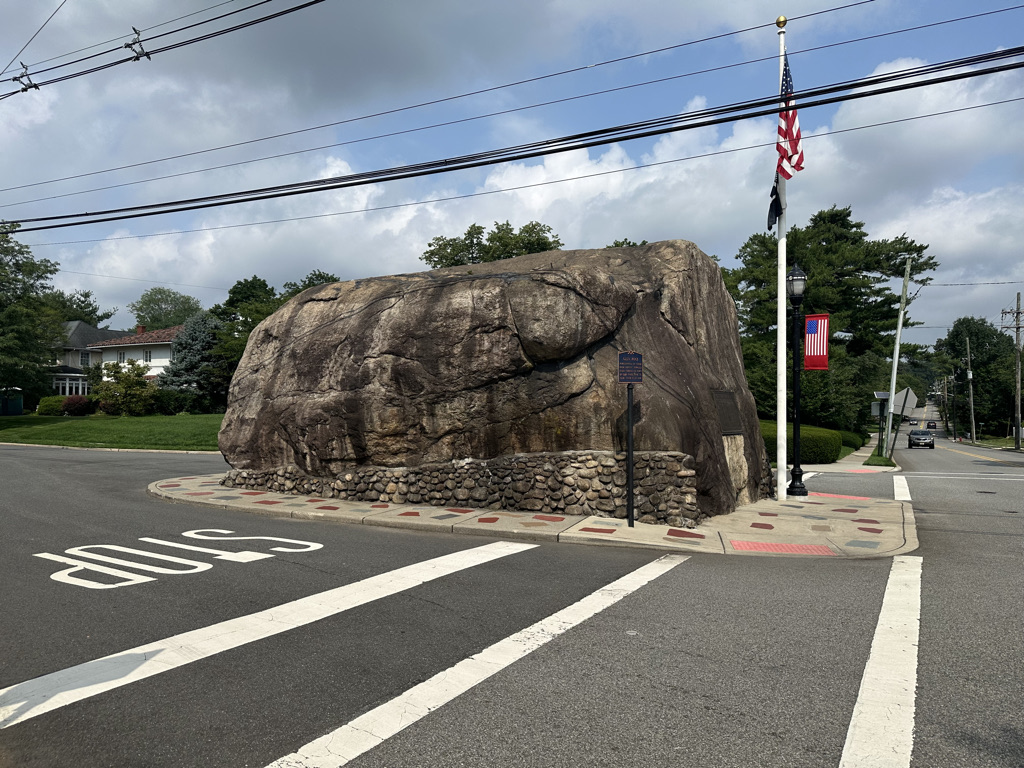
- Glen Rock's eponymous boulder at the intersection of Rock Road and Doremus Avenue

- Seal
- Interactive map of Glen Rock, New Jersey
- Location in Bergen County Location in New Jersey Location in the United States
- Coordinates: 40.959471°N 74.125202°W
- Country: United States
- State: New Jersey
- County: Bergen
- Incorporated: September 14, 1894
- Named for: Prominent glacial erratic

Government
  - Type: Borough
  - Body: Borough Council
  - Mayor: Kristine Morieko (D, term ends December 31, 2027)
  - Administrator: Steven Neale
  - Municipal clerk: Jacqueline Scalia

Area
  - Total: 2.72 sq mi (7.04 km^{2})
  - Land: 2.70 sq mi (7.00 km^{2})
  - Water: 0.015 sq mi (0.04 km^{2}) 0.51%
  - Rank: 364th of 565 in state 35th of 70 in county
- Elevation: 131 ft (40 m)

Population (2020)
  - Total: 12,133
  - Estimate (2023): 12,076
  - Rank: 208th of 565 in state 28th of 70 in county
  - Density: 4,488.7/sq mi (1,733.1/km^{2})
  - Rank: 134th of 565 in state 34th of 70 in county
- Time zone: UTC−05:00 (Eastern (EST))
  - Summer (DST): UTC−04:00 (Eastern (EDT))
- ZIP Code: 07452
- Area code: 201
- FIPS code: 3400326640
- GNIS feature ID: 0885233
- Website: www.glenrocknj.net

Glen Rock is a borough in Bergen County, in the U.S. state of New Jersey. As of the 2020 United States census, the borough's population was 12,133, an increase of 532 (+4.6%) from the 2010 census count of 11,601, which in turn reflected an increase of 55 (+0.5%) from the 11,546 counted in the 2000 census.

The borough has been one of the state's highest-income communities. Based on data from the American Community Survey for 2013–2017, Glen Rock residents had a median household income of $162,443, ranked 6th in the state among municipalities with more than 10,000 residents, more than double the statewide median of $76,475.

Glen Rock was voted one of the best places to live in New Jersey for its low crime rate, good schools, close proximity to New York City and its high property values, including in 2018, when Niche ranked it the 19th best place to live in New Jersey.

== History ==
Glen Rock was formed on September 14, 1894, from portions of Ridgewood Township and Saddle River Township during the "Boroughitis" phenomenon then sweeping through Bergen County, in which 26 boroughs were formed in the county in 1894 alone. The main impetus for the break from Ridgewood Township was the decision to have Glen Rock students attend a new school closer to the center of Ridgewood instead of their one-room schoolhouse located at the intersection of Ackerman Avenue and Rock Road. Originally, the borough was to be named "South Ridgewood", but the name was changed to Glen Rock before the proposal for the borough was submitted. Both the origin of the name Glen Rock and the cause of it becoming the borough's name are unclear.

The borough was settled around the Glen Rock, a large boulder in a small valley (glen), from which the borough gets its name. The rock, a glacial erratic weighing in at 570 short tons (520 t) and located where Doremus Avenue meets Rock Road, is believed to have been carried to the site by a glacier that picked up the rock 15,000 years ago near Peekskill, New York, and carried it for 20 miles (32 km) to its present location. The Lenape Native Americans called the boulder "Pamachapuka" (meaning "stone from heaven" or "stone from the sky") and used it for signal fires and as a trail marker.

The borough was the site of one of Bergen County's most serious public transportation accidents. In 1911, a trolley operator for the North Jersey Rapid Transit Company, one day away from retirement, died in a crash with an opposing trolley around the intersection of Prospect and Grove Streets that was caused by signal problems. In addition to the death of the opposing trolley operator, 12 people were injured. This crash in part hastened the demise of this transportation mode which ran from Elmwood Park, New Jersey, to Suffern, New York, and competed with the Erie Railroad. The right of way for this trolley line was purchased by the Public Service Enterprise Group and is still visible today.

== Geography ==
According to the United States Census Bureau, the borough had a total area of 2.72 square miles (7.04 km^{2}), including 2.70 square miles (7.00 km^{2}) of land and 0.01 square miles (0.04 km^{2}) of water (0.51%).

Unincorporated communities, localities and place names located partially or completely within the borough include Ferndale.

The borough borders the municipalities of Fair Lawn, Paramus and Ridgewood in Bergen County, and Hawthorne in Passaic County.

== Demographics ==
Historical population
Census	Pop.	Note	%±
1900	613		—
1910	1,055		72.1%
1920	2,181		106.7%
1930	4,369		100.3%
1940	5,177		18.5%
1950	7,145		38.0%
1960	12,896		80.5%
1970	13,011		0.9%
1980	11,497		−11.6%
1990	10,883		−5.3%
2000	11,546		6.1%
2010	11,601		0.5%
2020	12,133		4.6%
2023 (est.)	12,076	▼	−0.5%
Population sources: 1900–1920 1900–1910; 1910–1930 1900–2020; 2000 2010 2020

=== Racial and ethnic composition ===
Glen Rock borough, Bergen County, New Jersey – Racial and ethnic composition Note: the US Census treats Hispanic/Latino as an ethnic category. This table excludes Latinos from the racial categories and assigns them to a separate category. Hispanics/Latinos may be of any race.
Race / Ethnicity (NH = Non-Hispanic)	Pop 2000	Pop 2010	Pop 2020	% 2000	% 2010	% 2020
White alone (NH)	10,163	9,691	9,037	88.02%	83.54%	74.48%
Black or African American alone (NH)	206	151	163	1.78%	1.30%	1.34%
Native American or Alaska Native alone (NH)	11	5	0	0.10%	0.04%	0.00%
Asian alone (NH)	748	1,050	1,617	6.48%	9.05%	13.33%
Native Hawaiian or Pacific Islander alone (NH)	2	3	1	0.02%	0.03%	0.01%
Other race alone (NH)	19	24	25	0.16%	0.21%	0.21%
Mixed race or Multiracial (NH)	83	150	442	0.72%	1.29%	3.64%
Hispanic or Latino (any race)	314	527	848	2.72%	4.54%	6.99%
Total	11,546	11,601	12,133	100.00%	100.00%	100.00%

=== 2020 census ===
As of the 2020 census, Glen Rock had a population of 12,133. The median age was 41.8 years. 28.4% of residents were under the age of 18 and 15.0% of residents were 65 years of age or older. For every 100 females there were 95.1 males, and for every 100 females age 18 and over there were 91.9 males age 18 and over.

100.0% of residents lived in urban areas, while 0.0% lived in rural areas.

There were 3,934 households in Glen Rock, of which 46.2% had children under the age of 18 living in them. Of all households, 76.3% were married-couple households, 6.1% were households with a male householder and no spouse or partner present, and 15.7% were households with a female householder and no spouse or partner present. About 12.2% of all households were made up of individuals and 8.4% had someone living alone who was 65 years of age or older.

There were 4,041 housing units, of which 2.6% were vacant. The homeowner vacancy rate was 0.7% and the rental vacancy rate was 5.2%.

=== 2010 census ===
The 2010 United States census counted 11,601 people, 3,917 households, and 3,290 families in the borough. The population density was 4,275.2 per square mile (1,650.7/km^{2}). There were 4,016 housing units at an average density of 1,480.0 per square mile (571.4/km^{2}). The racial makeup was 87.16% (10,111) White, 1.37% (159) Black or African American, 0.09% (10) Native American, 9.09% (1,054) Asian, 0.03% (3) Pacific Islander, 0.62% (72) from other races, and 1.66% (192) from two or more races. Hispanic or Latino of any race were 4.54% (527) of the population.

Of the 3,917 households, 46.3% had children under the age of 18; 75.4% were married couples living together; 6.5% had a female householder with no husband present and 16.0% were non-families. Of all households, 14.2% were made up of individuals and 8.9% had someone living alone who was 65 years of age or older. The average household size was 2.96 and the average family size was 3.28.

30.0% of the population were under the age of 18, 5.1% from 18 to 24, 19.7% from 25 to 44, 32.3% from 45 to 64, and 12.9% who were 65 years of age or older. The median age was 42.2 years. For every 100 females, the population had 94.5 males. For every 100 females ages 18 and older there were 90.1 males.

The Census Bureau's 2006–2010 American Community Survey showed that (in 2010 inflation-adjusted dollars) median household income was $140,882 (with a margin of error of +/− $13,445) and the median family income was $160,360 (+/− $10,024). Males had a median income of $110,506 (+/− $13,238) versus $64,250 (+/− $11,788) for females. The per capita income for the borough was $61,013 (+/− $6,466). About 1.1% of families and 1.4% of the population were below the poverty line, including 0.6% of those under age 18 and 2.2% of those age 65 or over.

Same-sex couples headed 20 households in 2010, an increase from the 15 counted in 2000.

=== 2000 census ===
As of the 2000 United States census there were 11,546 people, 3,977 households, and 3,320 families residing in the borough. The population density was 4,246.1 inhabitants per square mile (1,639.4/km^{2}). There were 4,024 housing units at an average density of 1,479.9 per square mile (571.4/km^{2}). The racial makeup of the borough was 90.07% White, 1.81% African American, 0.16% Native American, 6.48% Asian, 0.02% Pacific Islander, 0.61% from other races, and 0.86% from two or more races. Hispanic or Latino of any race were 2.72% of the population.

There were 3,977 households, out of which 43.8% had children under the age of 18 living with them, 75.1% were married couples living together, 6.8% had a female householder with no husband present, and 16.5% were non-families. 14.7% of all households were made up of individuals, and 9.2% had someone living alone who was 65 years of age or older. The average household size was 2.89 and the average family size was 3.22.

In the borough the age distribution of the population shows 29.4% under the age of 18, 3.9% from 18 to 24, 27.4% from 25 to 44, 25.6% from 45 to 64, and 13.7% who were 65 years of age or older. The median age was 40 years. For every 100 females, there were 94.9 males. For every 100 females age 18 and over, there were 89.5 males.

The median income for a household in the borough was $104,192, and the median income for a family was $111,280. Males had a median income of $84,614 versus $52,430 for females. The per capita income for the borough was $45,091. About 2.1% of families and 2.4% of the population were below the poverty line, including 2.0% of those under age 18 and 3.8% of those age 65 or over.

== Economy ==
Glen Rock's central business district is situated on a roughly 0.2 mile (0.3 km) stretch of Rock Road between the borough's two train stations. Long-standing businesses include the Glen Rock Inn, a bar and restaurant in operation since 1948, and the Rock Ridge Pharmacy, opened in 1950.

Corporate residents of Glen Rock include Genovese & Maddalene, an architectural firm that specialized in designing churches.

== Arts and culture ==
Musical groups from the borough include the indie-rock band Titus Andronicus.

In October 2005, many scenes of prominent locations in town were shot for the film World Trade Center, starring Nicolas Cage and directed by Oliver Stone, with Glen Rock having had 11 residents who were killed in the September 11 terrorist attacks.

== Government ==
=== Local government ===
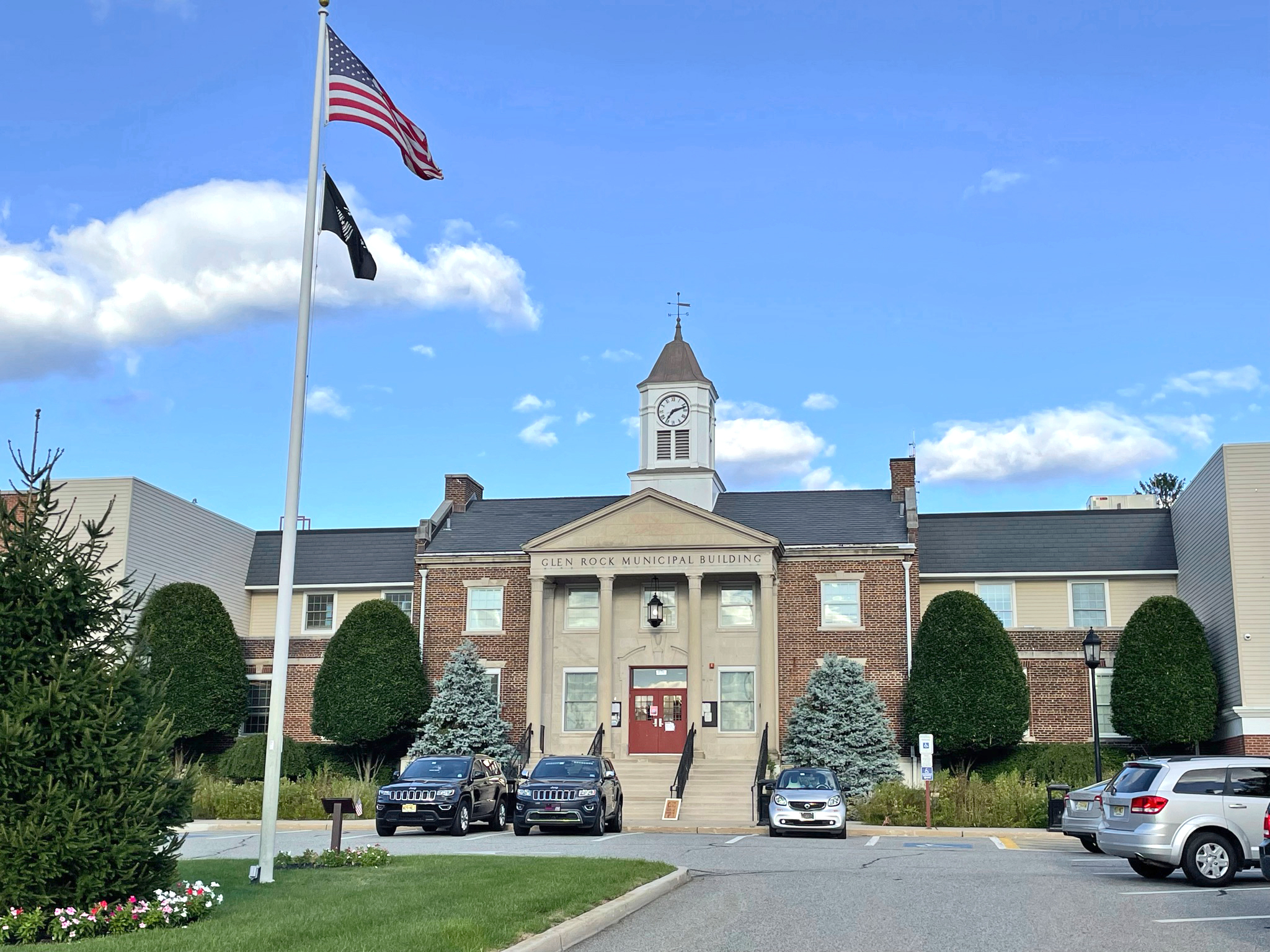
Glen Rock Borough Hall

Glen Rock is governed under the borough form of New Jersey municipal government, which is used in 218 municipalities (of the 564) statewide, making it the most common form of government in New Jersey. The governing body is comprised of the mayor and the borough council, with all positions elected at-large on a partisan basis as part of the November general election. The mayor is elected directly by the voters to a four-year term of office. The borough council includes six members elected to serve three-year terms on a staggered basis, with two seats coming up for election each year in a three-year cycle.

The borough form of government used by Glen Rock is a "weak mayor / strong council" government in which council members act as the legislative body with the mayor presiding at meetings and voting only in the event of a tie. The mayor can veto ordinances subject to an override by a two-thirds majority vote of the council. The mayor makes committee and liaison assignments for council members, and most appointments are made by the mayor with the advice and consent of the council. The council appoints a professional borough administrator who is the chief administrative officer of the borough, responsible to the mayor and council.

As of 2026, the mayor of Glen Rock is Democrat Kristine Morieko, whose term of office ends December 31, 2027. Members of the Borough Council are Council President Amy Martin (D, 2026) , Elizabeth Coll (D, 2026), Jon Hendl (D, 2028), Jill Orlich (D, 2027), Seth Rosenstein (D, 2028) and Maureen Rozanski.

In January 2020, the borough council chose Caroline Unzaga from a list of three candidates nominated by the Democratic municipal committee to fill the seat expiring in December 2021 that had been held by Kristine Morieko until she stepped down to take office as mayor.

In July 2019, the borough council selected Michelle Torpey from a list of three names nominated by the Republican municipal committee to fill the seat expiring in December 2019 that was vacated by Bill J. Leonard Jr. after he resigned from office and announced that he was moving out of the borough.

Bruce Packer won the mayoral seat in the 2015 general election over incumbent John van Keuren, who had been seeking a fourth term. Packer's Democratic running-mates William "Skip" Huisking and Kristine Morieko were also elected to three-year Borough Council terms, giving the borough a Democratic mayor for the first time in 12 years, and a 3–3 split on the council.

Glen Rock's borough government recognizes an annual Poverty Awareness Week. The community comes together for an annual project to combat extreme global poverty. In 2007, the community built a Habitat House in Paterson, New Jersey (the second home built by Glen Rock residents), and the community was honored as Paterson Habitat's Volunteers of the Year (a first for a community). In 2008, the Borough came together for the Water for Africa Music Festival. The event raised the funds to pay for two Roundabout PlayPump water systems in sub-Saharan Africa. In 2009, the community continued its battle against poverty, raising funds to battle malaria in hurricane-ravaged Haiti.

The borough government has declared Glen Rock a sustainable community, pursuing a "Green Up" policy that reflects a commitment to protecting the borough's trees, water and general environment. Shade trees are provided at no cost annually to citizens with cooperation from the DPW. On April 10, 2019, the borough council passed an ordinance outlawing single-use plastic bags in retail establishments.

=== Federal, state and county representation ===
Glen Rock is located in the 5th congressional district and is part of New Jersey's New Jersey's 38th legislative district. For the 119th United States Congress, New Jersey's 5th congressional district is represented by Josh Gottheimer (D, Wyckoff). New Jersey is represented in the United States Senate by Democrats Cory Booker (Newark, term ends 2027) and Andy Kim (Moorestown, term ends 2031).

For the 2026–2027 session, the 38th legislative district of the New Jersey Legislature is represented in the State Senate by Joseph Lagana (D, Paramus) and in the General Assembly by Lisa Swain (D, Fair Lawn) and Chris Tully (D, Bergenfield).

Bergen County is governed by a directly elected County Executive, with legislative functions performed by a Board of County Commissioners comprised of seven members who are elected at-large to three-year terms in partisan elections on a staggered basis, with either two or three seats coming up for election each November; a Chairman and Vice Chairman are selected from among its seven members at a reorganization meeting held every January. As of 2025, the county executive is James J. Tedesco III (D, Paramus), whose four-year term of office ends December 31, 2026.

Bergen County's Commissioners are Chair Mary J. Amoroso (D, Mahwah, 2025), Vice Chair Steven A. Tanelli (D, North Arlington, 2027), Chair Pro Tem Joan Voss (D, Fort Lee, 2026), Rafael Marte (D, Bergenfield, 2026), Germaine M. Ortiz (D, Emerson, 2025), Thomas J. Sullivan Jr. (D, Montvale, 2025) and Tracy Silna Zur (D, Franklin Lakes, 2027).

Bergen County's elected constitutional officials are Clerk John S. Hogan (D, Northvale, 2026), Sheriff Anthony Cureton (D, Englewood, 2027) and Surrogate Michael R. Dressler (D, Cresskill, 2026).

=== Politics ===
As of March 2011, there were a total of 8,112 registered voters in Glen Rock, of which 2,490 (30.7% vs. 31.7% countywide) were registered as Democrats, 1,971 (24.3% vs. 21.1%) were registered as Republicans and 3,645 (44.9% vs. 47.1%) were registered as Unaffiliated. There were 6 voters registered as Libertarians or Greens. Among the borough's 2010 Census population, 69.9% (vs. 57.1% in Bergen County) were registered to vote, including 99.9% of those ages 18 and over (vs. 73.7% countywide).

Gubernatorial election results for Glen Rock
Year	Republican		Democratic		Third party(ies)	
Year	No.	%	No.	%	No.	%
2025	2,260	38.97%	3,527	60.82%	12	0.21%
2021	2,045	40.32%	2,996	59.07%	31	0.61%
2017	1,577	39.76%	2,353	59.33%	36	0.91%
2013	2,606	61.64%	1,574	37.23%	48	1.14%
2009	2,116	45.70%	2,204	47.60%	310	6.70%
2005	2,055	46.60%	2,273	51.54%	82	1.86%

In the 2016 presidential election, Democrat Hillary Clinton received 4,063 votes (60.4% vs. 54.2% countywide), ahead of Republican Donald Trump with 2,355 votes (35.0% vs. 41.1%) and other candidates with 206 votes (3.1% vs. 4.6%), among the 6,787 ballots cast by the borough's 8885 registered voters, for a turnout of 76.7% (vs. 72.5% in Bergen County). In the 2012 presidential election, Democrat Barack Obama received 3,326 votes (52.6% vs. 54.8% countywide), ahead of Republican Mitt Romney with 2,881 votes (45.5% vs. 43.5%) and other candidates with 50 votes (0.8% vs. 0.9%), among the 6,326 ballots cast by the borough's 8,486 registered voters, for a turnout of 74.5% (vs. 70.4% in Bergen County). In the 2008 presidential election, Democrat Barack Obama received 3,762 votes (55.3% vs. 53.9% countywide), ahead of Republican John McCain with 2,955 votes (43.4% vs. 44.5%) and other candidates with 45 votes (0.7% vs. 0.8%), among the 6,807 ballots cast by the borough's 8,316 registered voters, for a turnout of 81.9% (vs. 76.8% in Bergen County). In the 2004 presidential election, Democrat John Kerry received 3,333 votes (51.5% vs. 51.7% countywide), ahead of Republican George W. Bush with 3,092 votes (47.8% vs. 47.2%) and other candidates with 38 votes (0.6% vs. 0.7%), among the 6,475 ballots cast by the borough's 7,931 registered voters, for a turnout of 81.6% (vs. 76.9% in the whole county).

Presidential elections results
Year	Republican	Democratic
2024	35.3% 2,498	61.5% 4,352
2020	32.2% 2,549	65.8% 5,213
2016	35.0% 2,355	60.4% 4,063
2012	45.5% 2,881	52.6% 3,326
2008	43.4% 2,955	55.3% 3,762
2004	47.8% 3,092	51.5% 3,333

In the 2013 gubernatorial election, Republican Chris Christie received 61.6% of the vote (2,606 cast), ahead of Democrat Barbara Buono with 37.2% (1,574 votes), and other candidates with 1.1% (48 votes), among the 4,329 ballots cast by the borough's 8,196 registered voters (101 ballots were spoiled), for a turnout of 52.8%. In the 2009 gubernatorial election, Democrat Jon Corzine received 2,204 ballots cast (47.2% vs. 48.0% countywide), ahead of Republican Chris Christie with 2,116 votes (45.3% vs. 45.8%), Independent Chris Daggett with 299 votes (6.4% vs. 4.7%) and other candidates with 11 votes (0.2% vs. 0.5%), among the 4,666 ballots cast by the borough's 8,203 registered voters, yielding a 56.9% turnout (vs. 50.0% in the county).

United States Senate election results for Glen Rock1
Year	Republican		Democratic		Third party(ies)	
Year	No.	%	No.	%	No.	%
2024	2,588	37.74%	4,195	61.17%	75	1.09%
2018	2,023	41.73%	2,722	56.15%	103	2.12%
2012	2,602	45.13%	3,093	53.64%	71	1.23%
2006	2,212	46.97%	2,447	51.96%	50	1.06%

United States Senate election results for Glen Rock2
Year	Republican		Democratic		Third party(ies)	
Year	No.	%	No.	%	No.	%
2020	2,785	35.77%	4,920	63.20%	80	1.03%
2014	1,825	40.22%	2,656	58.54%	56	1.23%
2013	1,058	37.83%	1,722	61.57%	17	0.61%
2008	2,888	46.58%	3,273	52.79%	39	0.63%

== Education ==
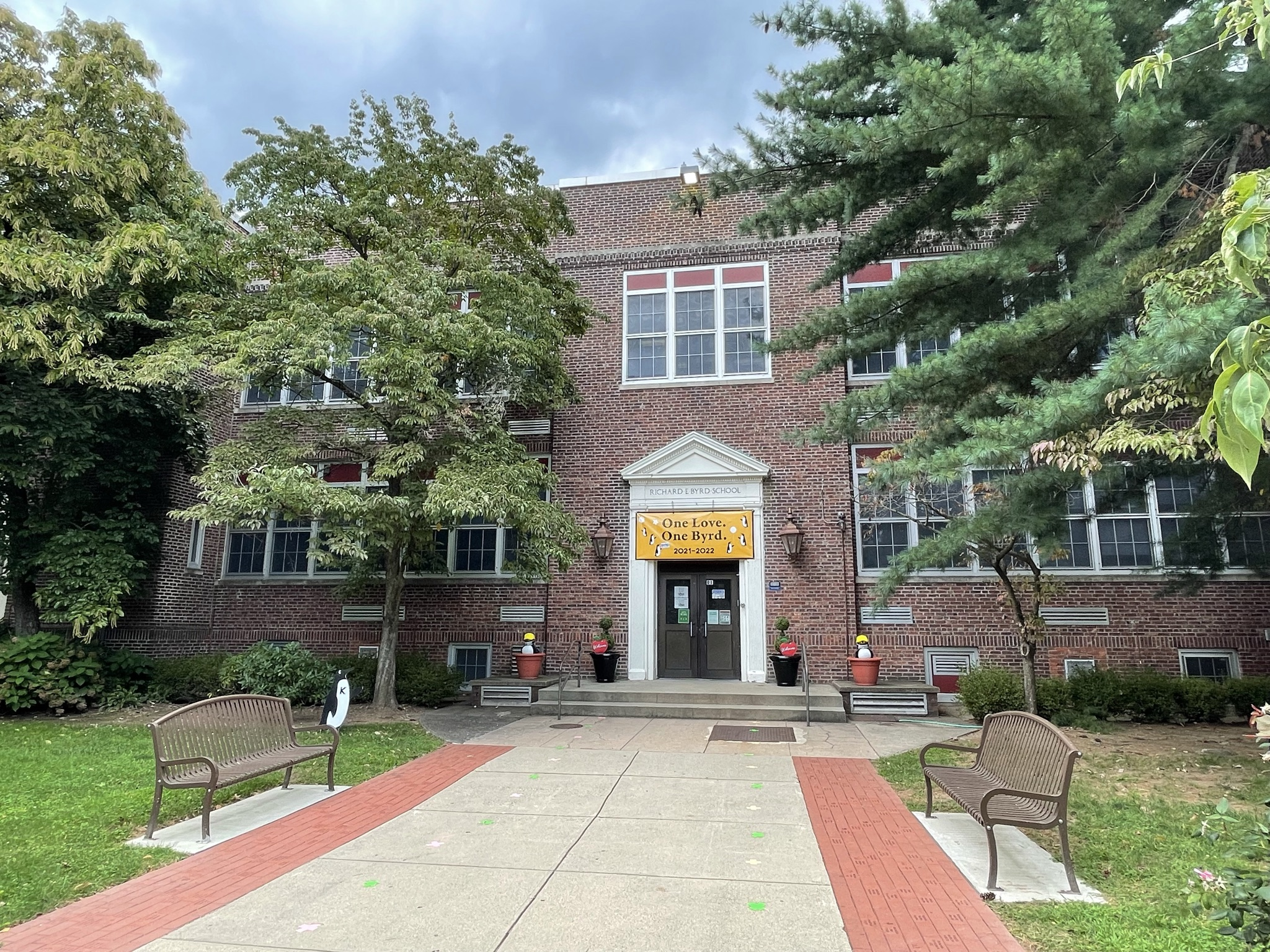
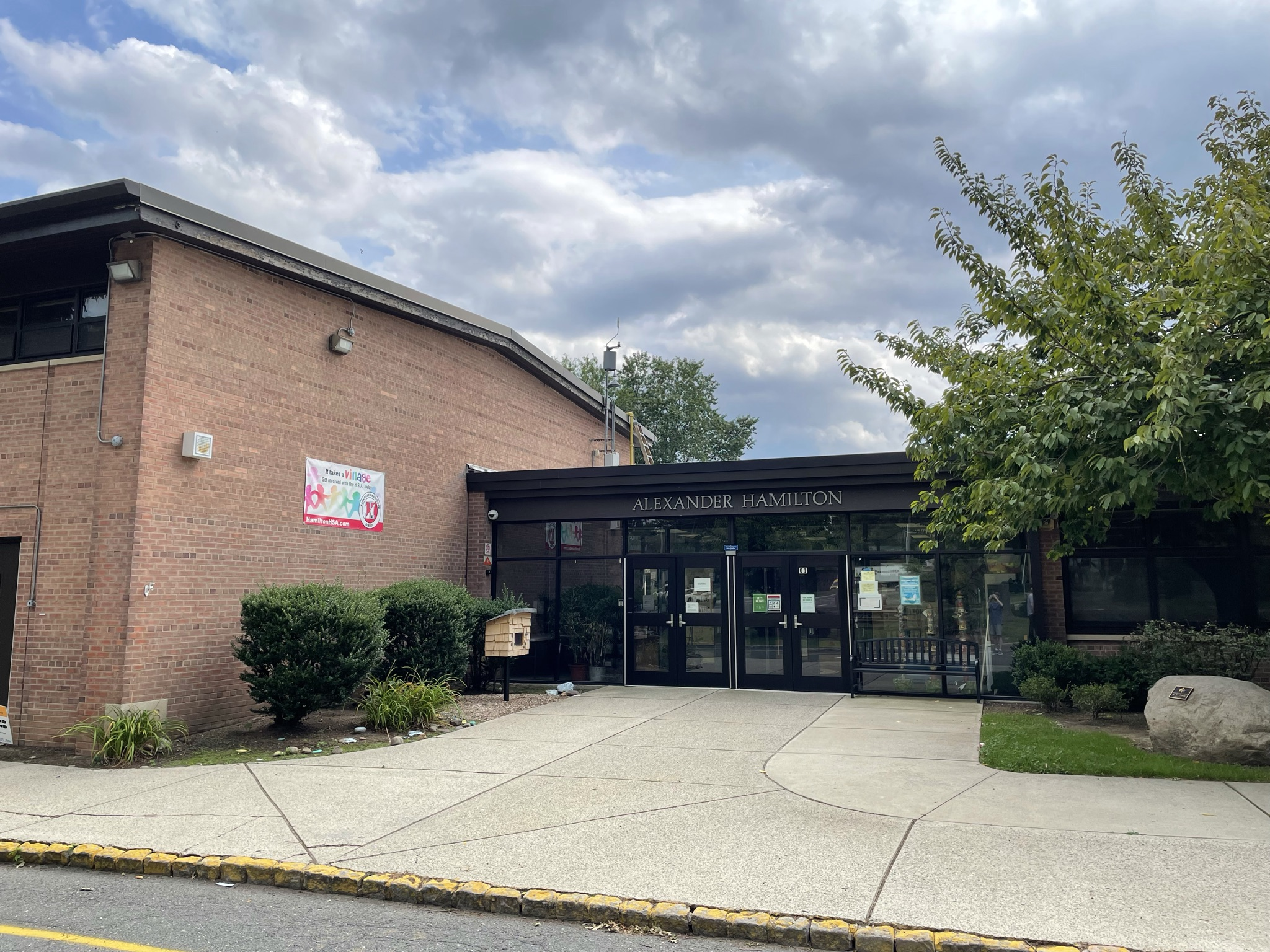
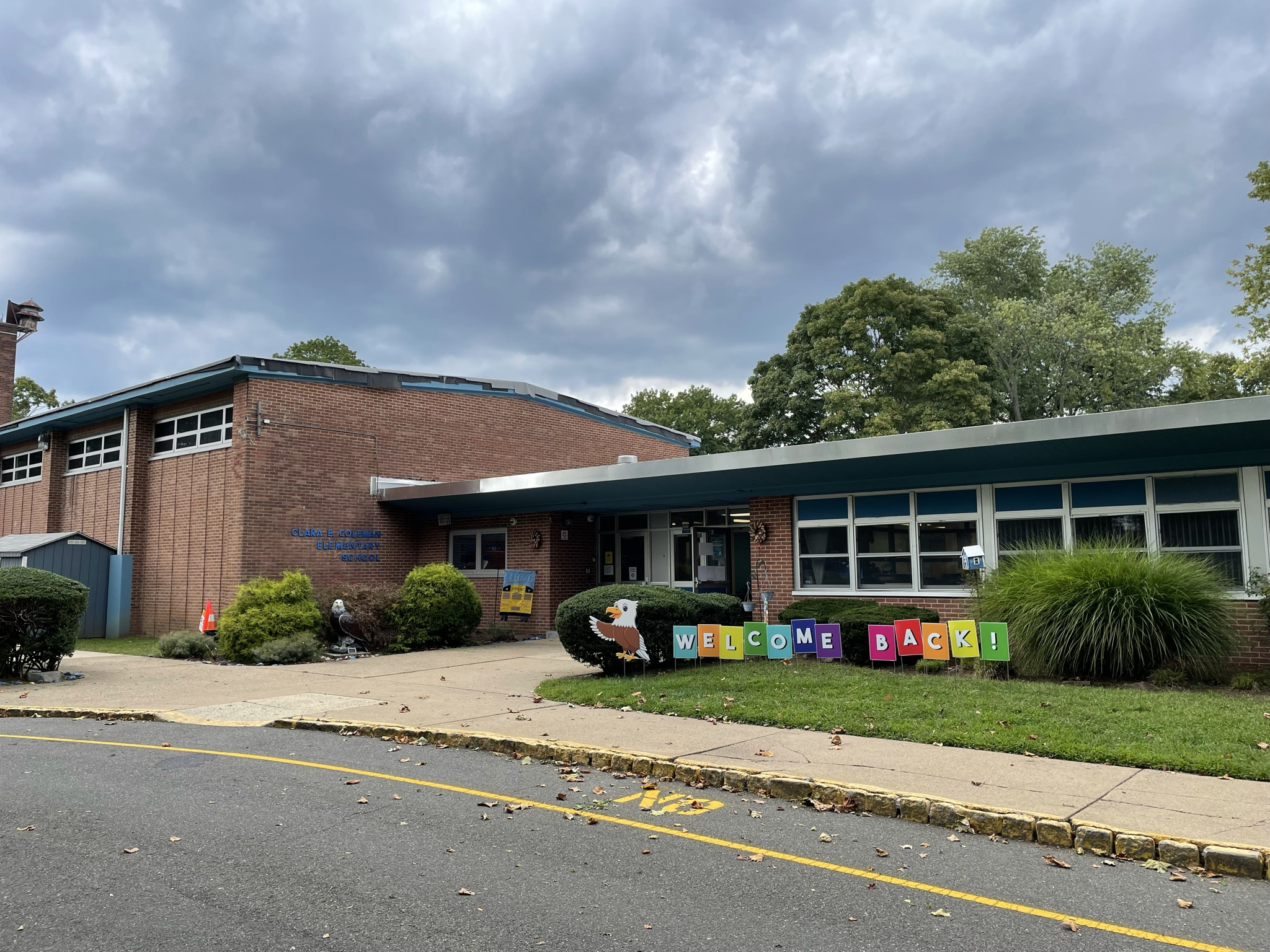
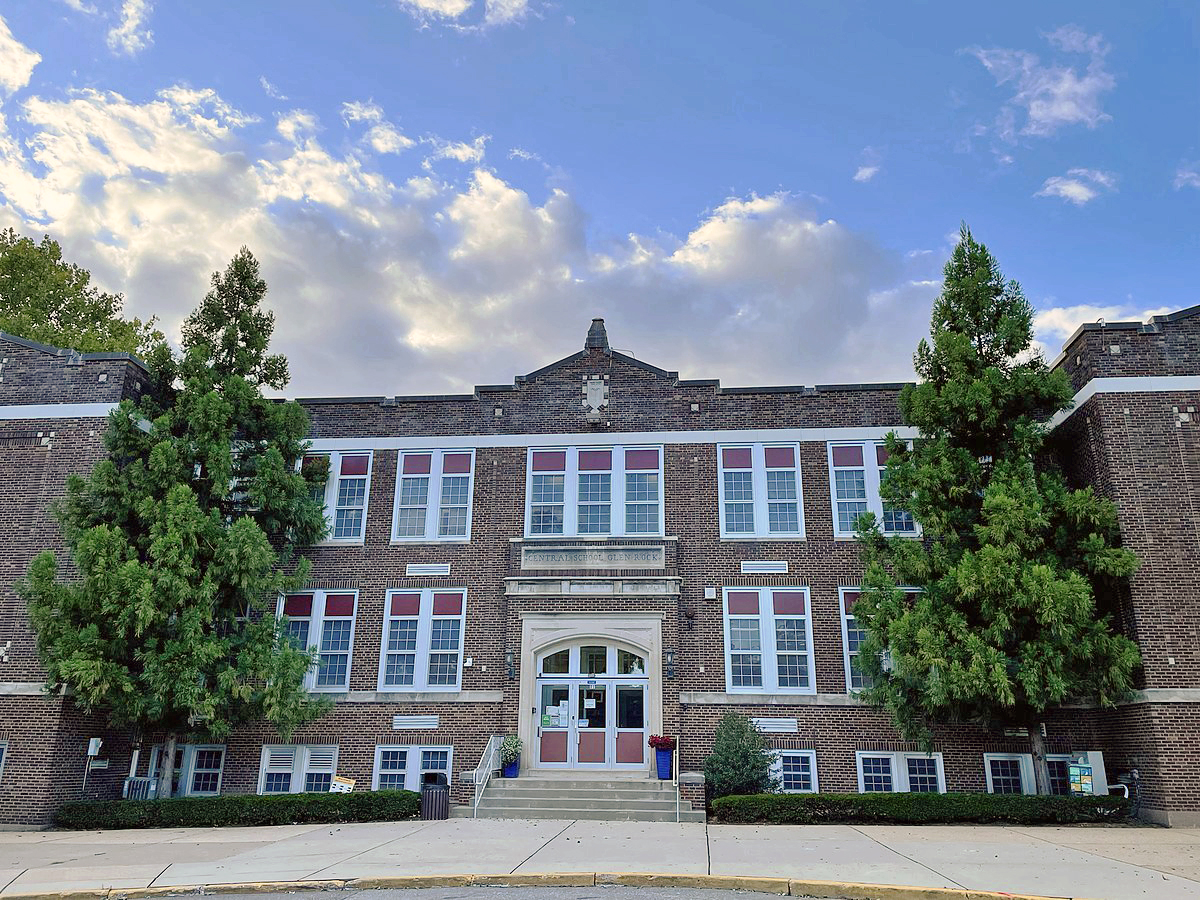
The four Glen Rock public elementary schools: (clockwise from top left) Richard E. Byrd School, Alexander Hamilton School, Central Elementary School, Clara E. Coleman School

The Glen Rock Public Schools serve students in kindergarten through twelfth grade. The operation of the district is overseen by a nine-member board of education. As of the 2022–23 school year, the district, comprised of six schools, had an enrollment of 2,620 students and 222.9 classroom teachers (on an FTE basis), for a student–teacher ratio of 11.8:1. Schools in the district (with 2022–23 enrollment data from the National Center for Education Statistics) are Richard E. Byrd School with 269 students in grades K–5, Central Elementary School with 339 students in grades K–5, Clara E. Coleman School with 351 students in grades K–5, Alexander Hamilton Elementary School with 281 students in grades K–5, Glen Rock Middle School with 621 students in grades 6–8 and Glen Rock High School with 729 students in grades 9–12.

Public school students from the borough (and all of Bergen County) are eligible to attend the secondary education programs offered by the Bergen County Technical Schools, which include Bergen County Academies in Hackensack and the Bergen Tech campuses in Teterboro and Paramus. The district offers programs on a shared-time or full-time basis, with admission based on a selective application process and tuition covered by the student's home school district.

Academy of Our Lady is a Catholic school for students in pre-kindergarten through eighth grade that is affiliated with St. Catharine's Roman Catholic Church located in Glen Rock and Our Lady of Mount Carmel in neighboring Ridgewood, and is operated under the supervision of the Roman Catholic Archdiocese of Newark. In September 2013, the school was one of 15 schools in New Jersey to be recognized by the National Blue Ribbon Schools Program, which Education Secretary Arne Duncan described as schools that "represent examples of educational excellence".

== Transportation ==
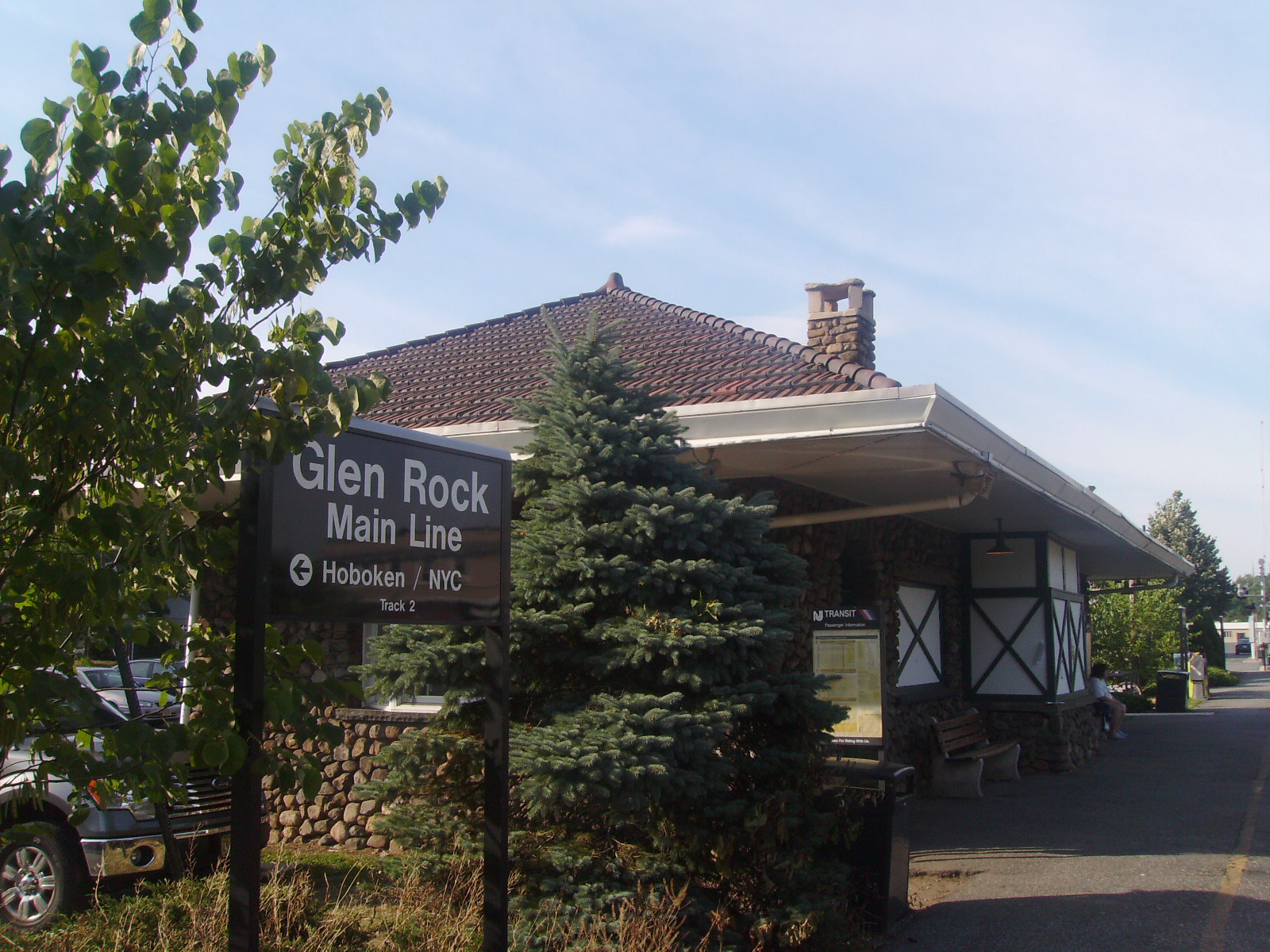
Glen Rock–Main Line station

=== Roads and highways ===
As of May 2010, the borough had a total of 44.67 miles (71.89 km) of roadways, of which 35.23 miles (56.70 km) were maintained by the municipality, 8.87 miles (14.27 km) by Bergen County, and 0.57 miles (0.92 km) by the New Jersey Department of Transportation.

Glen Rock is served by Route 208, which runs southeast to northwest from Fair Lawn to Oakland.

=== Public transportation ===
Glen Rock has two NJ Transit train stations: Glen Rock–Main Line station on the Main Line located at Rock Road and Main Street, and Glen Rock–Boro Hall station on the Bergen County Line at Harding Plaza between Maple Avenue and Rock Road. Both lines provide service to Hoboken Terminal, with transfers available at Secaucus Junction to New York Penn Station in Midtown Manhattan and to most of NJ Transit's other train lines.

NJ Transit provides bus service to and from the Port Authority Bus Terminal in Midtown Manhattan on the 148 (on Route 208), 164, and 196 (also on Route 208) bus lines, service to the George Washington Bridge Bus Station on the 175, and local service on the 722 (on Lincoln Avenue) and 746 bus lines.

== Culture ==
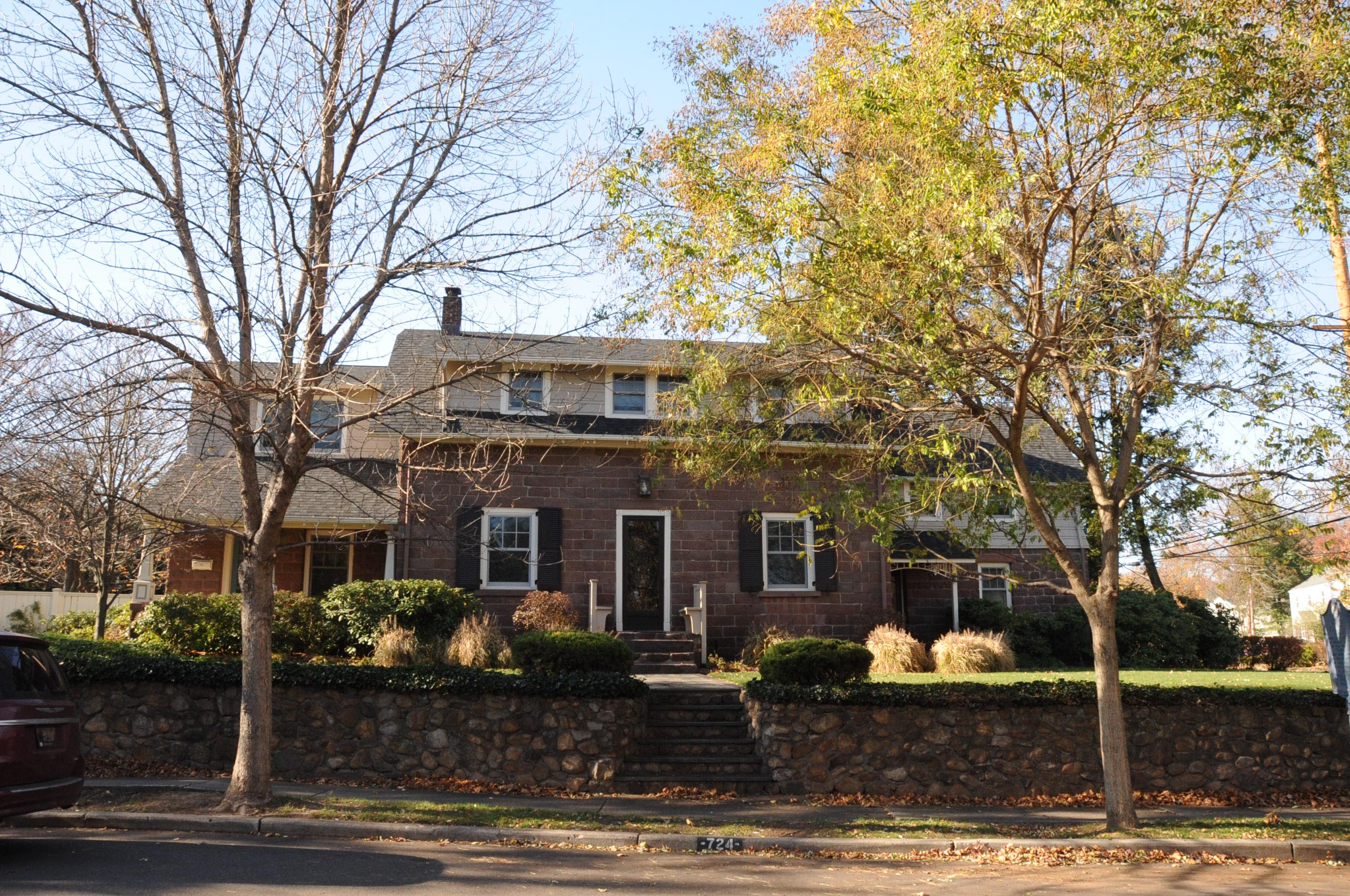
Hendrick Hopper House, a historic home on the National Register of Historic Places located on Ackerman Avenue in Glen Rock

The Hendrick Hopper House is a historic building located on the corner of Ackerman and Hillman Avenues. The site was added to the National Register of Historic Places in 1983 as site #83001526.

Glen Rock is home to an architecturally prominent Sikh gurudwara. As much as 90% of the borough's Indian American constituency was estimated by one member in 2014 to have moved to Glen Rock within the preceding two-year period alone. In February 2015, the Glen Rock Board of Education voted to designate the Hindu holy day Diwali as an annual school holiday, making it the county's first district to do so.

The Jewish community is centered around the Glen Rock Jewish Center which offers prayer services and Jewish education.

Local bookstore, Books, Bytes & Beyond, hosted significant, sold-out book signing tours for J.K. Rowling in the late 1990s, making it a notable spot for American Harry Potter fans to meet her during the early days of her fame. These appearances solidified Glen Rock's connection to the author as she signed books and met fans in the area.

== Notable people ==
People who were born in, residents of, or otherwise closely associated with Glen Rock include:

- Camille Abate, attorney and Democratic Party politician
- Kim Barnes Arico (born 1970), women's college basketball coach who is the head coach of the University of Michigan women's basketball team
- Larry Arico (born 1969), former head college football coach for the Fairleigh Dickinson University–Florham Devils and William Paterson University Pioneers football programs
- Corinne May Botz (born 1977), visual artist and educator whose practice encompasses photography, writing, and filmmaking
- Guy W. Calissi (1909–1980), New Jersey Superior Court judge
- Keith Cardona (born 1992), goalkeeper for the Indy Eleven of the North American Soccer League
- Michael Cavanaugh (born 1972), vocalist and musician, star of the Broadway musical Movin' Out
- Brandon Crawley (born 1997), former professional ice hockey player
- Daniel Flaherty (born 1993), actor who has appeared on the MTV show Skins as well as in films and commercials
- Pauline Flanagan (1925–2003), actress
- Bob Franks (1951–2010), member of the United States House of Representatives from New Jersey
- Gurbir Grewal (born 1973), Attorney General of New Jersey since 2018, who is the first Sikh American state attorney general in the United States
- Valerie Harper (1939–2019), actress best known for playing Rhoda Morgenstern on The Mary Tyler Moore Show and the spin-off series Rhoda
- Bud Hedinger (born 1947), Orlando, Florida, radio personality
- George Hotz (born 1989), first person to unlock iPhone for use with carriers other than AT&T
- John Houghtaling (1916–2009), who created the Magic Fingers Vibrating Bed in the basement of his home in Glen Rock
- Julia Meade (1925–2016), film and stage actress who was a frequent pitch person in live commercials in the early days of television
- Paul Melicharek (born c. 1991), football defensive lineman who has played professionally for the Green Bay Blizzard and Lehigh Valley Steelhawks
- Robert J. Motzer, genitourinary medical oncologist
- Samuel Petrone (born 1989), professional soccer forward who has played for the Swedish team Mjällby AIF
- Lisa Rogak author, primarily of biographies and other non-fiction books
- Warren Ruggiero (born 1966), American football coach who is offensive coordinator for Wake Forest
- Mariko Sakai (born 1990), Japanese synchronized swimmer who competed in the women's team event at the 2012 Olympic Games
- Julie Spira, author
- Paul Stekler (born 1953), documentary filmmaker (George Wallace: Settin' the Woods on Fire, Eyes on the Prize II) and chair of the Department of Radio Television Film at the University of Texas
- Patrick Stickles (born 1985), musician and the lead singer, frontman and songwriter of the punk rock band Titus Andronicus
- Charlie Tahan (born 1997), child actor in the 2007 film I Am Legend
- Daisy Tahan (born 2001), child actor who appeared in Nurse Jackie
- Ludovicus M. M. Van Iersel (1893–1987), recipient of the Medal of Honor for his actions in France during World War I
- Floyd Vivino (born 1951), actor also known as Uncle Floyd
- Jimmy Vivino (born 1955), leader of The Basic Cable Band, the house band on the TBS late night program Conan
- William Wadsworth Evans (1887–1972), politician who served in the New Jersey General Assembly from 1919 to 1924
- Adrian Wojnarowski (born 1969), general manager of the St. Bonaventure Bonnies men's basketball team and former sportswriter for ESPN and The Record
- Will Wood, alternative rock singer-songwriter and keyboardist
- Michael Zegen (born 1979), actor best known for his role as Joel Maisel on The Marvelous Mrs. Maisel

== Sources ==
- Municipal Incorporations of the State of New Jersey (according to Counties) prepared by the Division of Local Government, Department of the Treasury (New Jersey); December 1, 1958.
- Clayton, W. Woodford; and Nelson, Nelson. History of Bergen and Passaic Counties, New Jersey, with Biographical Sketches of Many of its Pioneers and Prominent Men. Philadelphia: Everts and Peck, 1882.
- Harvey, Cornelius Burnham (ed.), Genealogical History of Hudson and Bergen Counties, New Jersey. New York: New Jersey Genealogical Publishing Co., 1900.
- Van Valen, James M. History of Bergen County, New Jersey. New York: New Jersey Publishing and Engraving Co., 1900.
- Westervelt, Frances A. (Frances Augusta), 1858–1942, History of Bergen County, New Jersey, 1630–1923, Lewis Historical Publishing Company, 1923.
