= Salem County Career and Technical High School =

High school in Salem County, New Jersey, US

Location
- 880 Route 45; Pilesgrove Township, Salem County, New Jersey 08098; United States
- Coordinates: 39.717679°N 75.455836°W

Information
- Type: Vocational public high school
- School district: Salem County Vocational Technical Schools
- NCES School ID: 341458005098
- Principal: Jason Helder
- Faculty: 47.5 FTEs
- Grades: 9-12
- Enrollment: 733 (as of 2023–24)
- Student to teacher ratio: 15.4:1
- Colors: Navy and Carolina blue
- Athletics conference: Tri-County Conference
- Team name: Chargers
- Accreditation: Middle States Association of Colleges and Schools
- Website: scvts.org

Salem County Career and Technical High School is a four-year vocational public high school located in Pilesgrove Township, in the U.S. state of New Jersey, that serves the vocational education needs of students in ninth through twelfth grades in Salem County, as part of the Salem County Vocational Technical Schools. The school is accredited until January 2030 by the Middle States Association of Colleges and Schools Commission on Elementary and Secondary Schools.

As of the 2023–24 school year, the school had an enrollment of 733 students and 47.5 classroom teachers (on an FTE basis), for a student–teacher ratio of 15.4:1. There were 106 students (14.5% of enrollment) eligible for free lunch and 27 (3.7% of students) eligible for reduced-cost lunch.

== Awards, recognition and rankings ==
Schooldigger.com ranked the school 196th out of 411 public high schools statewide in its 2014 rankings, a decrease of 39 positions from its 2013 ranking (which featured only 396 schools). Schools were ranked based on the combined percentage of students classified as proficient or above proficient on the mathematics (79.8%) and language arts literacy (96.9%) components of the High School Proficiency Assessment (HSPA).

== Athletics ==
The Salem County Career and Technical High School Chargers compete in the Tri-County Conference, which is comprised of 23 public and private high schools in Camden, Cape May, Cumberland, Gloucester, and Salemcounties. The conference is overseen by the New Jersey State Interscholastic Athletic Association (NJSIAA). With 588 student athletes in grades 9-12 as of the 2022-2023 school year, the school was classified as Group II for most athletic competition purposes, which included schools with an enrollment of 456 to 708 students in that grade range.

== Administration ==
The school's principal is Jason Helder. The core administration team includes the assistant principal.
