= Salem County Vocational Technical Schools =

School district in Salem County, New Jersey, US

Address
- Box 350 Woodstown, Salem County, New Jersey, 08098
- Coordinates: 39.66465°N 75.380339°W

District information
- Grades: Vocational
- Superintendent: John R. Swain
- Business administrator: Frank Maurer
- Schools: 1

Students and staff
- Enrollment: 695 (as of 2023–24)
- Faculty: 47.9 FTEs
- Student–teacher ratio: 14.5:1

Other information
- Website: www.scvts.org
Ind.	Per pupil	District spending	Rank (*)	Vocational average	%± vs. average
1A	Total Spending	$14,017	3	$18,891	−25.8%
1	Budgetary Cost	10,477	1	17,296	−39.4%
2	Classroom Instruction	6,246	1	9,045	−30.9%
6	Support Services	1,556	6	2,269	−31.4%
8	Administrative Cost	1,211	2	2,353	−48.5%
10	Operations & Maintenance	1,423	1	3,014	−52.8%
13	Extracurricular Activities	41	1	464	−91.2%
16	Median Teacher Salary	52,168	2	65,035
Data from NJDoE 2014 Taxpayers' Guide to Education Spending. *Of Vocational districts with any number of students. Lowest spending=1; Highest=21

The Salem County Vocational Technical Schools (SCVTS) is a countywide vocational and technical public school district, serving the educational needs of residents of Salem County, in the U.S. state of New Jersey. The district offers programs on both a full-time and shared-time basis in cooperation and partnership with the county's elementary and secondary schools, local and regional colleges and universities, for both school-aged students and adults.

As of the 2023–24 school year, the district, comprised of one school, had an enrollment of 695 students and 47.9 classroom teachers (on an FTE basis), for a student–teacher ratio of 14.5:1.

== Schools ==
Schools in the district (with 2023-24 enrollment data from the National Center for Education Statistics) are:

- Salem County Career and Technical High School offering 14 career and technical education programs, with 733 students in grades 9-12.
  - Jason Helder, principal

== Administration ==
Core members of the district's administration are:

- John R. Swain, superintendent
- Frank Maurer, business administrator and board secretary

== Board of education ==
The district's board of education sets policy and oversee the fiscal and educational operation of the district through its administration. The board is composed of seven members, the county superintendent of schools, who serves on an ex officio basis, and six members who are appointed by the Salem County Board of County Commissioners to three-year terms of office on a staggered basis, with two member terms up for reappointment and expiring each year. The board appoints a superintendent to oversee the district's day-to-day operations and a business administrator to supervise the business functions of the district.
