= Glen Rock (boulder) =

Large boulder in New Jersey

- Pamackapuka (Delaware)
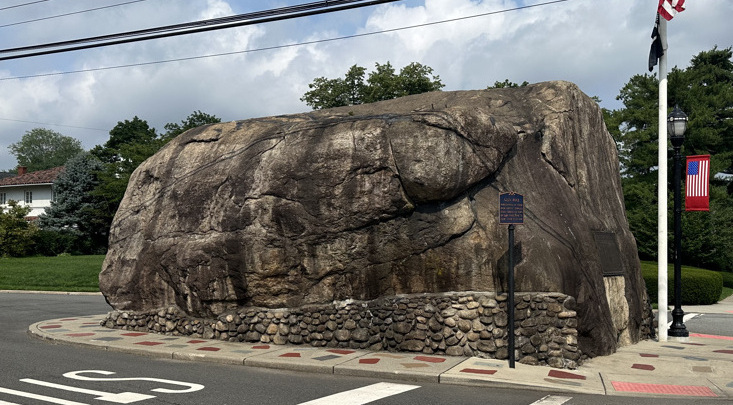
- The Glen Rock in 2023
- Interactive map of Glen Rock
- 40°57′46″N 74°08′06″W
- Location: Glen Rock, New Jersey, United States

Site notes
- Height: 22 feet (6.7 m)

The Glen Rock is a 570-ton boulder located in Glen Rock, New Jersey, United States. The boulder, which is the namesake of the town in which it is located, is the largest glacial erratic found atop Triassic bedrock in the state of New Jersey. The exact origin of the rock is uncertain, though studies alternatively place its origin in New York State's Hudson Highlands and the New Jersey Highlands. The Glen Rock, which is composed of gneiss, is located in the center of a former glacial lake.

The cultural history of the Glen Rock predates the settlement of New Jersey by European colonists. The Lenape, who referred to the boulder as Pamackapuka, used the rock as a trail marker, a location to build signal fires, and as a throne for chiefs used when presiding over meetings. Later, beginning in colonial times, European settlers to the region used the rock as a landmark on trails and as a marker for land deeds. The Glen Rock, which had been largely submerged under soil, was excavated during road work in 1912; supporting structures were added to the rock during that time to prevent it from collapsing. Following the First World War, a memorial plaque was installed on the rock to honor veterans who had died during the conflict. In 1964, the New Jersey State Office of Historic Sites designated the Glen Rock as a state landmark.

== Geology and natural history ==
The Glen Rock is composed of gneiss, though the rock has granitic aspects. The Glen Rock measures forty-four feet wide, twenty-two feet high, and twelve feet long. The boulder weights 570 tons and is the largest glacial erratic found atop Triassic bedrock in the state of New Jersey.

The boulder, a large glacial erratic, is not native to the Newark Basin. Its exact location of origin is uncertain. A 1971 report by the New Jersey Geological Survey found that the rock was carried between ten and twenty miles from the New Jersey Highlands to its current location in Glen Rock, New Jersey as glaciers receded during the end of the last Ice Age, while a 2009 report by the Borough of Glen Rock finds that the most likely origin of the rock are the southeastern areas of the Hudson Highlands located in New York State, citing the boulder's rounded shape and the Hudson Highlands' bedrock composition. The boulder is located in the center of a former glacial lake; the boulder may have floated upon an iceberg and subsequently sank into its current location.

== Cultural history ==
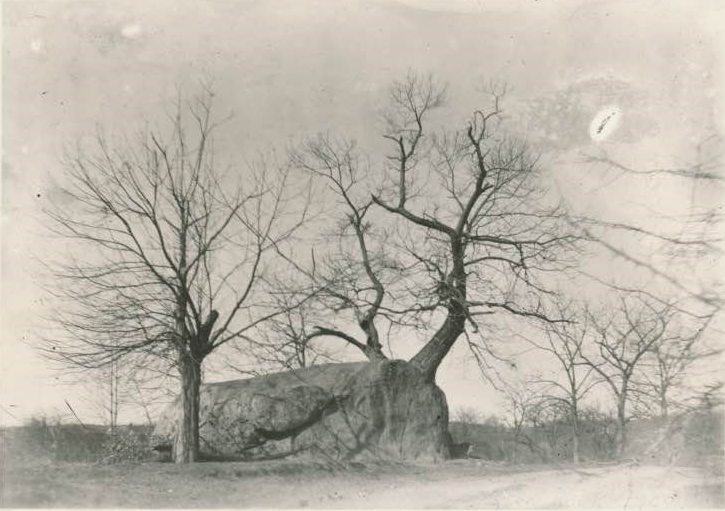
The Glen Rock in 1890

=== Indigenous, colonial, and early American use ===
Prior to the arrival of European settlers, Native Americans used the Glen Rock as a trail marker as well as a place to build signal fires. The Lenape, who were natives of the region, referred to the boulder as Pamackapuka (also transliterated Pammackapuka). The meaning of the name is disputed; some translate the name of the rock as "stone from heaven" or "stone from the sky", while others translate the name of the rock as "sweat house". The large rock was also used by indigenous chieftains as a throne when presiding over meetings with members of their tribe and served as the location of several inter-tribal meetings among natives.

Later, as colonists arrived to the region, they used the rock as a landmark for their trails. The rock, referred to as "Big Rock at Small Lots" by early colonists, began serving as a landmark used in the division of land in West Jersey as early as 1687. The rock served as a key marker for all colonial-era land deeds, composing one of the points used in the eighteenth-century survey of the Ramapo Tract. In 1894, a group of Ridgewood, New Jersey residents seceded from the then-township to form a new municipality, calling it the "Borough of Glen Rock" after the glacial erratic within its newly formed borders. The rock was used as a reference point in Native American land deeds that were still on the books as late as 1912. As of 1928, the rock was the only remaining fixed marker that had been used to delineate the colonial boundary dividing East Jersey from West Jersey.

=== 1910–1912 excavation and construction ===
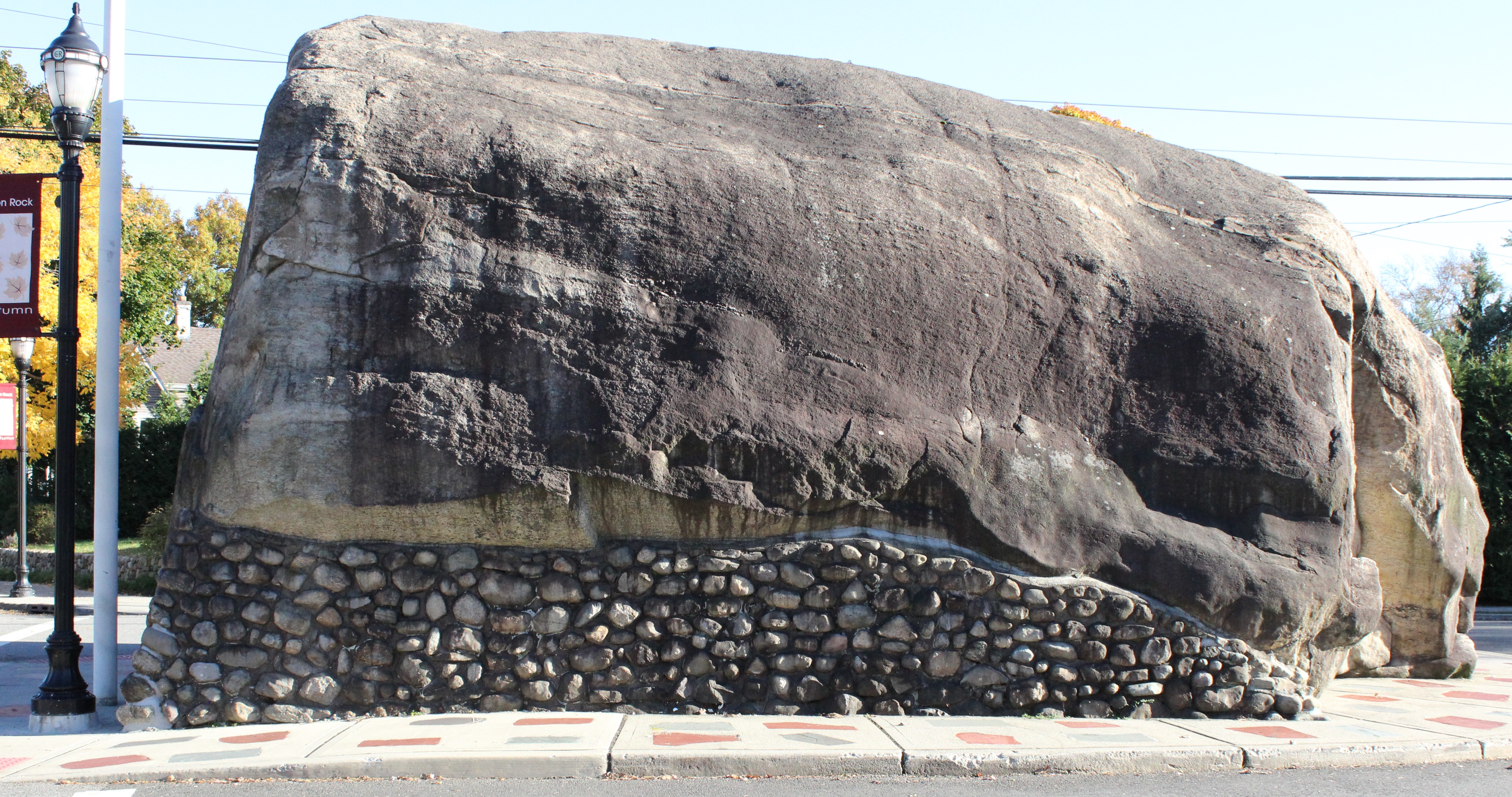
The man-made base that supports the massive Glen Rock

About half of the Glen Rock remained submerged under soil until 1910, when soil was gradually excavated to properly grade streets near the boulder. The soil removal revealed the boulder's massive size. In 1912, the Glen Rock was threatened with destruction due to the ongoing roadwork in the borough. Developers initially desired to destroy the boulder, though they faced public outcry from borough residents who felt that the rock had substantial historical value. Later, they decided to construct the road to go around the landmark rock and to transfer the deed for the land on which the rock resides to the borough. In October of that year, work was undertaken to support the base of the Glen Rock with additional stonework and wide cement walkway was added to improve the quality of the area. The Paterson Morning Call described the rock as having "considerable historic value" and commented approvingly on the renovations.

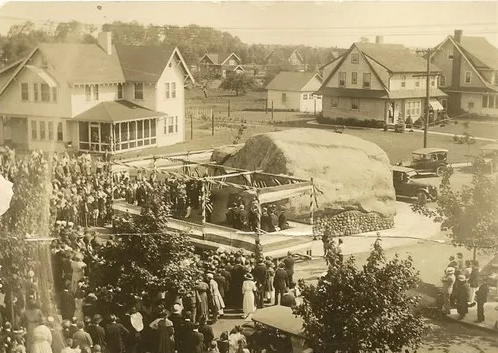
The Glen Rock during the unveiling of the memorial plaque on May 30, 1921

=== World War I memorial ===
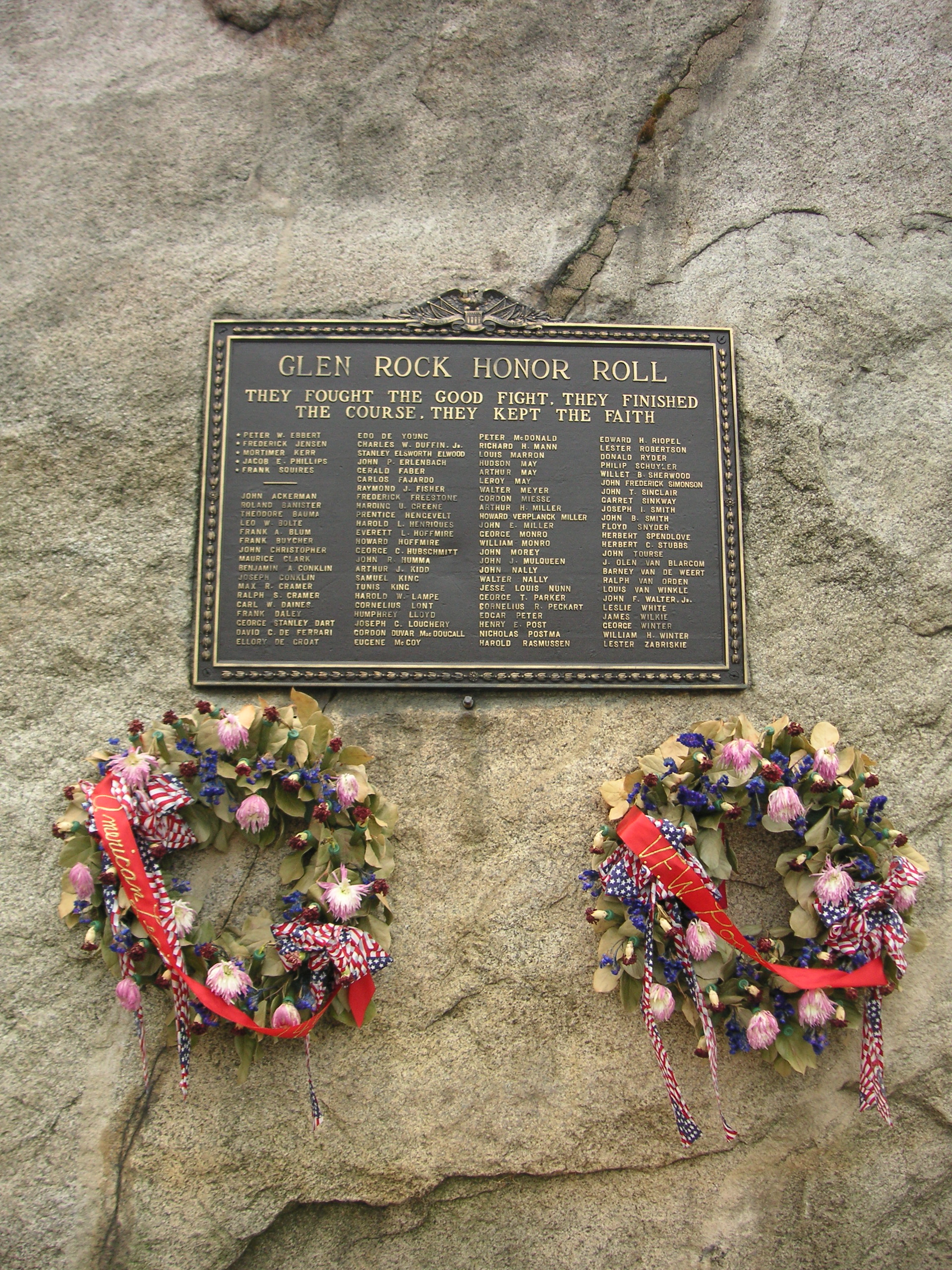
The Glen Rock Honor Roll in 2007

In 1921, the Borough Council of Glen Rock created a committee to raise funds to place a memorial plaque on the Glen Rock to honor the town's veterans of the United States military who had died during World War I. The council had initially attempted to allocate $500 towards the project that February, but turned to fundraising efforts in March after they discovered that there were no contingency funds available to spend. The committee, with the help of the local Boy Scouts, successfully raised enough funds for the project to be completed; the bronze plaque was subsequently installed and was unveiled at a ceremony held on May 30 of that year.

The plaque fixed on the rock bears the names of five individuals from the borough who died during the First World War, as well as the names of eighty-nine others who honorably served in combat. The Glen Rock is located across from the home of Peter Ebbert, the first resident of the borough to have been killed-in-action during the conflict.

=== Landmark designation ===
Over time, the Glen Rock became a symbol of the Borough of Glen Rock. In 1964, the New Jersey State Office of Historic Sites designated the Glen Rock as a historical landmark and placed a commemorative sign beside the war memorial. In 1969, on the 75th anniversary of the Borough of Glen Rock's founding, a time capsule to be opened in 2044 was buried in the ground beside the Glen Rock.

By the mid-1970s, the sign provided by the Office of Historic Sites had disappeared, having been stolen from its location next to the glacial erratic. A replica of the original sign, which contained information on the boulder's history, was created and screwed onto a seven-foot-tall pole constructed to deter vandals in 1985. The replacement sign was stolen in April 1986, recovered by Glen Rock police in October 1986, and subsequently welded to the pole to discourage future sign thieves.

== See also ==
- List of individual rocks
