= Mobile dating =

Dating with a mobile device

Mobile dating services, also known as cell dating, cellular dating, or cell phone dating, allow individuals to chat, flirt, meet, and possibly become romantically involved by means of text messaging, mobile chatting, and the mobile web. These services involve the use of smartphones or mobile devices and associated apps that can be downloaded to connect with romantic or sexual partners.

These services allow their users to provide information about themselves in a short profile which is either stored in their phones as a dating ID or as a username on the mobile dating site. They can then search for other IDs online or by calling a certain phone number dictated by the service. The criteria include age, gender and sexual preference. Usually these sites are free to use but standard text messaging fees may still apply as well as a small fee the dating service charges per message.

Mobile dating websites, in order to increase the opportunities for meeting, focus attention on users that share the same social network and proximity. Some companies even offer services such as homing devices to alert users when another user is within thirty feet of one another. Some systems involve bluetooth technology to connect users in locations such as bars and clubs. This is known as proximity dating. These systems are actually more popular in some countries in Europe and Asia than online dating. With the advent of GPS Phones and GSM localization, proximity dating is likely to rise sharply in popularity.

According to The San Francisco Chronicle in 2005, "Mobile dating is the next big leap in online socializing." More than 3.6 million cell phone users logged into mobile dating sites in March 2007, with most users falling between the ages of 27-35.

Some experts believe that the rise in mobile dating is due to the growing popularity of online dating. Others believe it is all about choice, as Joe Brennan Jr., vice president of Webdate says, "It's about giving people a choice. They don't have to date on their computer. They can date on their handset, it's all about letting people decide what path is best for them." A study published in 2015 showed that 7.8 million singles per month in the UK were searching for a partner online, which was a significant increase from 2011 (6.3 million). This increase is allegedly caused by Mobile Dating due to current social dating services like Tinder or Badoo, which allow people to quickly make new contacts on the go.

The rise of mobile dating and in particular, dating app Tinder has changed the way people meet potential partners and date. Some believe that the proliferation of such apps has fueled modern dating behaviors.

== Drawbacks ==
Some avoid these services for fear that the technology could be used to electronically harass users. Another issue is "asymmetry of interests", i.e. an attractive user receives excessive attention from other users and leaves, which may result in deterioration of membership. At the 2012 iDate Mobile Dating Conference, the first ever consumer focus group for mobile dating apps unanimously reiterated the same complaints from years prior.

All participants had some concerns about risk. These concerns varied between participants and included physical, emotional and sexual risks, the risk of being scammed, the risk of encountering dangerous and dodgy people, the risk of pregnancy, risks to family and the risk of lies and deceit. To counter these risks, participants undertook various activities that made use of the technological resources available to them and also assessed how others did or did not use technology.

An issue amplified by dating apps is a phenomenon known as 'ghosting', whereby one party in a relationship cuts off all communication with the other party without warning or explanation. Ghosting poses a serious problem for dating apps as it can lead to users deleting the apps. For this reason, Bumble and Badoo added features that make it easier for users to end chat conversations more politely.

Entering a different era with many technological advancements a "technosexual era", we also enter a different era of dating more "sexualized".

== Mobile dating market ==
Mobile dating began to take shape in 2003. ProxiDating was one of the first dating services using Bluetooth. In 2004 Match.com, Webdate and Lavalife were the mobile dating early leaders. It wasn't until the iPhone arrived in 2007 that mobile dating took off. 2010 was the year mobile dating becoming mainstream. Starting from 2012, mobile dating has been gradually overtaking online dating. Match.com and POF.com now see over 40% of their log-ins coming from mobile phones. The mobile dating market is expected to grow to $1.4B by 2013.

3G Dating is emerging as 3G networks and Video Mobiles become more widespread. The potential for one-to-one video calling offers additional safety and helps ensures members are real.

In the dating market, both online dating sites are adding mobile web versions and applications to phones. Some sites are offered as mobile only for Phones and Pads, with no access to web versions.

Mobile dating apps market is estimated to be worth $2.1 billion". In 2013 there was "exponential growth" of dating websites creating apps and dating apps being used through a mobile device. Tinder has been up to par competing in this market "as of October 2014, the app has more than fifty million users" and also it is valued "anywhere from $750 million to $1 billion".

== See also ==
- Online dating applications
- Online dating service
