= Jim Picken =

American basketball and baseball player (1903–1975)

Personal information
- Born: August 7, 1903 East Liverpool, Ohio, U.S.
- Died: April 2, 1975 (aged 71) Moorestown, New Jersey, U.S.
- Listed height: 5 ft 10 in (1.78 m)
- Listed weight: 165 lb (75 kg)

Career information
- High school: Collingswood (Collingswood, New Jersey)
- College: Dartmouth (1924–1927)
- Position: Forward

Career history

Playing
- 1927–1928: Albany Senators
- 1927–1929: Hudson
- 1928–1929: Paterson Whirlwinds
- 1928–1930: Bristol Endees
- 1931–1932: Bridgeton Moose
- 1932–1933: Paterson Continentals
- 1932–1933: Bridgeton Gems
- 1932–1933: Philadelphia WPEN
- 1933–1934: Camden Brewers
- 1934–1935: Camden
- 1937–1938: Elizabeth

Coaching
- 1927–1931: Troy HS
- 1931–1940: Audubon HS
- 1941–19??: Clifford Scott HS

Career highlights
- As player: First-team All-EIBL (1927)

James Edison Picken (August 7, 1903 – April 2, 1975) was an early American professional basketball and minor league baseball player. He was born in East Liverpool, Ohio but grew up in Collingswood, New Jersey. Picken's basketball career during the 1920s and 1930s saw him spend time in the original American Basketball League, the Eastern Basketball League, and the Metropolitan Basketball League. His younger brother, Eddie Picken, was also a professional basketball player.

Picken attended Collingswood High School and then Dartmouth College, where he lettered in football, soccer, basketball, and baseball. Immediately after college he played for the Easton Farmers in the Eastern Shore League during the 1927 season, but quit after one year. He had only managed a .196 batting average in 51 at bats, so he decided to focus on playing professional basketball as well as becoming a schoolteacher. Over the years he coached high school football, basketball, and baseball at various high schools in New York and New Jersey. While coaching Audubon High School's football team, he won three conference championships in nine years.

A resident of Moorestown, New Jersey, Picken died there on April 2, 1975.
