= Dave Crossan =

American football player (1940–2019)

No. 57
- Position: Center

Personal information
- Born: June 8, 1940 (age 86); Philadelphia, Pennsylvania, U.S.
- Listed height: 6 ft 4 in (1.93 m)
- Listed weight: 245 lb (111 kg)

Career information
- High school: Collingswood (Collingswood, New Jersey)
- College: Maryland (1959–1962)
- NFL draft: 1963: 3rd round, 32nd overall pick
- AFL draft: 1963: 16th round, 125th overall pick

Career history
- Philadelphia Eagles (1963)*; Green Bay Packers (1964)*; Washington Redskins (1965); Atlanta Falcons (1966)*; Washington Redskins (1966–1969); Philadelphia Eagles (1970)*
- * Offseason or practice squad member only

Career NFL statistics
- Games played: 59
- Games started: 4
- Fumble recoveries: 2
- Stats at Pro Football Reference

David Harry Crossan (June 8, 1940 – November 6, 2019) was an American football center who played in the National Football League (NFL) for the Washington Redskins. He played college football at the University of Maryland and was drafted in the third round of the 1963 NFL draft by the Philadelphia Eagles. Crossan was also selected in the sixteenth round of the 1963 AFL draft by the Denver Broncos.

Crossan attended Collingswood High School in Collingswood, New Jersey.
