= Eddie Picken =

American basketball player

Personal information
- Born: June 13, 1907
- Died: November 17, 1994 (aged 87) Lumberton, New Jersey, U.S.
- Listed height: 5 ft 9 in (1.75 m)
- Listed weight: 185 lb (84 kg)

Career information
- High school: Collingswood (Collingswood, New Jersey); The Pennington School (Pennington, New Jersey)
- College: Dartmouth (1928–1931)

Career history

Playing
- 1931: Camden AC

Coaching
- 1931–196?: Troy HS

Edward C. Picken Sr. (June 13, 1907 – November 17, 1994) was an early American professional basketball player. He played in two games in the Eastern Basketball League for Camden Athletic Club during the 1931–32 season.

Picken attended Collingswood High School from 1922 to 1926, spent one college prep year at The Pennington School in 1926–27, and then matriculated at Dartmouth College in the fall of 1927. At Dartmouth he played for the basketball and baseball teams. His older brother, Jim Picken, also played numerous sports at Dartmouth, and the two of them were teammates for Camden during Eddie's two-game professional stint.

Beginning in 1931, Eddie served as basketball and baseball coach, athletic director, and schoolteacher at Troy High School in Troy, New York for 40 years. The school's hall of fame is named in his honor. He died on November 17, 1994, at the Mount Holly Center in Lumberton, New Jersey.
