= Collingswood High School =

High school in Camden County, New Jersey, US

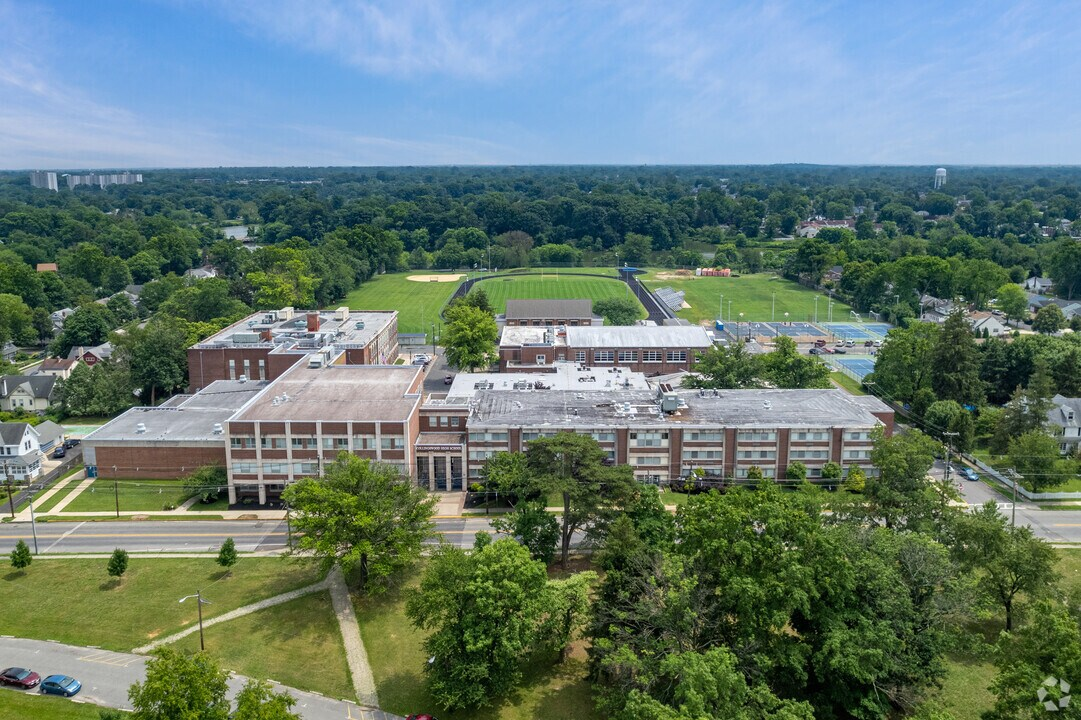
- Aerial view of the campus

Location
- 424 Collings Avenue; Collingswood, Camden County, New Jersey 08108; United States; 39°54′45″N 75°04′39″W

Information
- Type: Public high school
- Established: 1910
- NCES School ID: 340342001474
- Principal: Doug Newman
- Faculty: 56.2 FTEs
- Enrollment: 761 (as of 2024–25)
- Student to teacher ratio: 13.6:1
- Colors: Blue and gold
- Song: Hail the Gold and Blue
- Athletics conference: Colonial Conference (general); West Jersey Football League (football)
- Team name: Panthers
- Newspaper: Paw Print (formerly the Collingswood Chronicle)
- Website: www.collsk12.org/o/ch

Collingswood High School is a four-year comprehensive public high school that serves students in ninth through twelfth grades from Collingswood in Camden County, in the U.S. state of New Jersey. It is the sole secondary school of Collingswood Public Schools.

The high school offers courses in mathematics, sciences, humanities, as well as vocational courses, and offers Advanced Placement and honors courses.

As of the 2024–25 school year, the school had an enrollment of 761 students and 56.2 classroom teachers (on an FTE basis), for a student–teacher ratio of 13.6:1. There were 306 students (40.2% of enrollment) eligible for free lunch and 49 (6.4% of students) eligible for reduced-cost lunch.

Students in grades 9–12 from Oaklyn and Woodlynne attend Collingswood High School as part of sending/receiving relationships with the Oaklyn Public School District and Woodlynne School District.

== History ==
Schools were established in Collingswood soon after the borough was created in 1888. By 1909, the first football squad to represent the high school took the field and the first class of graduates left the school the following year.

Students from Gibbsboro and Voorhees Township had attended the district's high school as part of sending/receiving relationships with the Gibbsboro School District and the Voorhees Township Public Schools until Eastern Regional High School opened in September 1965.

Prior to the opening of Haddon Township High School in 1962, students from Haddon Township attended Collingswood High School.

The school's alma mater is "Hail the Gold and Blue"

== Awards, recognition and rankings ==
The school was the 208th-ranked public high school in New Jersey out of 339 schools statewide in New Jersey Monthly magazine's September 2014 cover story on the state's "Top Public High Schools", using a new ranking methodology. The school had been ranked 262nd in the state of 328 schools in 2012, after being ranked 267th in 2010 out of 322 schools listed. The magazine ranked the school 237th in 2008 out of 316 schools. The school was ranked 235th in the magazine's September 2006 issue, which surveyed 316 schools across the state.

== Extracurricular activities ==
The Collingswood Panther Marching Band, under the direction of Joe Lerch since 2003, has captured titles for the United States Scholastic Band Association (USSBA) All-States and New Jersey state championships in the years 2004 and 2005, and participated in the National Championships in 2006, 2007, and 2009. They have performed for the Philadelphia Phillies (three times), the Philadelphia Phantoms, and were the honorary band for the Susan G. Komen Walk for the Cure on Mother's Day 2008. More recently the Collingswood High School Panther Marching Band captured the Tournament of Bands 2010, 2012, 2013, and 2015 Southern NJ Chapter One Championships, the 2012 and 2013 Tournament of Bands New Jersey state championship, and the 2013 Tournament of Bands Atlantic Coast Championship. The Panther Band scored the highest band score in school history, with a 92.82 at the 2019 Atlantic Coast Championships. Most recently, the band was crowned the Cavalcade of Bands New Jersey State Champions for 2021.

Clubs and organizations at Collingswood High School include: Anime Club, Spanish Club, German Club, French Club, Latin Club, Junior Classical League, BeatMakers Club, Junior Black Student Union, Gender-Sexuality Alliance, Poetry Club, The Paw Print student paper (formerly The Collingswood Chronicle), The Social Justice League, Mock trial, Interact Club and Boys and Girls State Students also participate in state and national organizations such as Boys State.

The Academic Challenge team has been ranked No. 1 in South Jersey.

== Athletics ==
The Collingswood High School Panthers compete as a member school in the Colonial Conference, which is comprised of small schools in Camden and Gloucester counties whose enrollments generally do not exceed between 750 and 800 students for grades 9–12 and operates under the supervision of the New Jersey State Interscholastic Athletic Association (NJSIAA). With 612 students in grades 10–12, the school was classified by the NJSIAA for the 2022–24 school years as Group II South for most athletic competition purposes. The football team competes in the Colonial Division of the 94-team West Jersey Football League superconference and was classified by the NJSIAA as Group II South for football for 2024–2026, which included schools with 514 to 685 students.

The school participates in joint boys / girls swimming teams with Audubon High School as the host school / lead agency. These co-op programs operate under agreements scheduled to expire at the end of the 2023–24 school year.

Sports offered at the high school include:

- Boys
  - Fall – soccer, football, cross country
  - Winter – basketball, wrestling, bowling, swimming
  - Spring – track & field, baseball, tennis, volleyball
- Girls
  - Fall – soccer, tennis, cross country, field hockey, cheerleading, volleyball
  - Winter – basketball, swimming, bowling
  - Spring – track & field, softball, lacrosse

The baseball team won the South Jersey Group IV state championship in 1964 and won the South Jersey Group III title in 1966 and 1967.

The girls' lacrosse team won the sport's first overall state championship in 1976 (defeating Moorestown Friends School in the tournament final), and again in 1977 (vs. Moorestown High School), 1979 (vs. Moorestown Friends) and 1982 (vs. Moorestown); The program's four state championships are tied for seventh-most in the state. The 1976 team finished the season with a record of 17–1 after winning the state title with a 6–2 win against Moorestow Friends in the championship game.

The field hockey team won the South I state championship in 1974, and won the Group II state title in 1993 (defeating Northern Highlands Regional High School in the tournament final), 2000 (vs. Voorhees High School) and 2004 (vs. West Essex High School). The team won the 2000 South Jersey Group II state sectional championship with a 2–1 win against Camden Catholic High School in the tournament final and went on to finish the season at 22–1 after a double-overtime 2–1 win against Voorhees in the championship game played at The College of New Jersey. The 2004 field hockey team won the Group II state championship, defeating West Essex in the tournament final.

The girls basketball team finished the 1986 season with a 28–1 record, winning the Group II state title by a score of 76–66 in double overtime against Harrison High School in the championship game. The 2007–08 team won the Colonial Conference and South Jersey Group II championships, defeating Glassboro High School by a score of 47–42 to earn the team's first sectional title since 1986.

The wrestling team won the South Jersey Group II state sectional championship in 2006, 2016 and 2017, and the South Jersey Group I title in 2008. In 2006, the team won their first South Jersey Group II state sectional championship, defeating Cinnaminson High School by a final score of 43–17.

The 2007–08 boys' basketball team won the Colonial Conference and South Jersey Group II championships, edging Cinnaminson High School by a 70–69 score.

The girls track team won the indoor relay championship in Group I in 2018.

== Administration ==
The school's principal is Doug Newman. His core administration team includes two assistant principals.

== Notable alumni ==
- John Aglialoro (born 1943, class of 1961), businessman and film producer
- B. J. Averell (born 1979, class of 1998), co-winner of The Amazing Race 9
- Michael Corbett, actor, author, and television personality best known for his work starring in three daytime soap operas
- Jacqueline Crahalla (class of 1958), former Republican member of the Pennsylvania House of Representatives
- Dave Crossan (1940-2019, class of 1958), American football center who played in the NFL for the Washington Redskins
- William K. Dickey (1920–2008, class of 1938), speaker of the New Jersey General Assembly and chairman of the Delaware River Port Authority
- Cathy Engelbert (born 1965, class of 1982), first female CEO of Deloitte and first person to have the title of Commissioner of the WNBA
- Steve Kaplan (Class of 1969), former basketball player, who played 14 seasons in the Israel Basketball Premier League and is ranked 8th all-time in career points in the league
- Michael Landon (1936–1991, class of 1954), actor who had the nation's longest high school javelin throw – 193 feet 4 inches (58.93 m) – in 1954
- David Laury (born 1993), former professional basketball player
- Ted Laux (1916–1965, class of 1936), professional football player who played in the NFL for the Philadelphia Eagles
- Gerald Luongo (born 1938), politician who served in the New Jersey General Assembly, where he represented the 4th Legislative District
- Jimmy Lyon (1921–1984, class of 1939), jazz pianist
- Edwin Mills (1928-2021, class of 1946), economist and professor emeritus at Northwestern University
- Ray Narleski (1928–2012, class of 1946), professional baseball pitcher who played for the Cleveland Indians and Detroit Tigers
- George F. Neutze (1908–1969), politician who represented Camden County in the New Jersey General Assembly
- Stan Pawlak (class of 1963), former professional basketball player and coach
- Eddie Picken (1907–1994, class of 1924), early professional basketball player; younger brother of Jim
- Jim Picken (1903–1975, class of 1920), early professional basketball player; older brother of Eddie
- Matthew Quick (born 1973, class of 1992), author of The Silver Linings Playbook
- Richard Sterban (born 1943, class of 1960), bass singer who joined the country and gospel quartet The Oak Ridge Boys
- Bucky Waters (born 1935, class of 1953), basketball broadcaster with ESPN and Madison Square Garden Network and a retired NCAA basketball head coach
- Gary Williams (born 1945, class of 1963), former head coach of the Ohio State Buckeyes and Maryland Terrapins men's basketball teams
