= Collingswood Public Schools =

High school in Camden County, New Jersey, US

Address
- 200 Lees Avenue Collingswood, Camden County, New Jersey, 08108; United States
- Coordinates: 39.912914°N 75.066992°W

District information
- Grades: PreK to 12
- Superintendent: Fredrick McDowell
- Business administrator: Beth Ann Coleman
- Schools: 9

Students and staff
- Enrollment: 2,207 (as of 2024–25)
- Faculty: 182.5 FTEs
- Student–teacher ratio: 12.1:1

Other information
- District Factor Group: FG
- Website: www.collsk12.org
Ind.	Per pupil	District spending	Rank (*)	K-12 average	%± vs. average
1A	Total Spending	$18,644	46	$18,891	−1.3%
1	Budgetary Cost	15,711	56	14,783	6.3%
2	Classroom Instruction	9,178	59	8,763	4.7%
6	Support Services	2,415	54	2,392	1.0%
8	Administrative Cost	1,593	47	1,485	7.3%
10	Operations & Maintenance	1,981	60	1,783	11.1%
13	Extracurricular Activities	531	60	268	98.1%
16	Median Teacher Salary	61,750	28	64,043
Data from NJDoE 2014 Taxpayers' Guide to Education Spending. *Of K-12 districts with 1,800-3,500 students. Lowest spending=1; Highest=68

The Collingswood Public Schools is a comprehensive community public school district that serves students in pre-kindergarten through twelfth grade from Collingswood, in Camden County, in the U.S. state of New Jersey.

As of the 2024–25 school year, the district, comprised of nine schools, had an enrollment of 2,207 students and 182.5 classroom teachers (on an FTE basis), for a student–teacher ratio of 12.1:1.

The district participates in the Interdistrict Public School Choice Program, which allows non-resident students to attend school in the district at no cost to their parents, with tuition covered by the resident district. Available slots are announced annually by grade.

Students in ninth through twelfth grades from Woodlynne attend Collingswood High School as part of a sending/receiving relationship with the Woodlynne School District. Students in grades 6-12 from Oaklyn attend Collingswood's schools as part of a sending/receiving relationship with the Oaklyn Public School District.

== History ==
The school district gained national and international media attention in June 2016 for calling the police on a 3rd grader, who allegedly made inappropriate remarks about brownies served at an end-of-year school party. The incident has brought attention to a school district policy of involving armed law enforcement officers to deal with all school discipline matters including name calling, resulting in as many as five police visits a day according to Superintendent Scott Oswald. According to media reports, students were denied access to their parents and legal counsel during law enforcement interrogations, which take place within the school.

With an impending $3.4 million deficit within the Collingswood Public School District, the James A. Garfield Elementary School was permanently closed in June 2026 and 30 full-time positions were cut to fill the budget gap for the 2026–27 school year; the school's more than 100 students were reassigned to one of the other elementary schools in the district. The school building, which had opened in 1915, was closed and listed for sale.

The district had been classified by the New Jersey Department of Education as being in District Factor Group "FG", the fourth-highest of eight groupings. District Factor Groups organize districts statewide to allow comparison by common socioeconomic characteristics of the local districts. From lowest socioeconomic status to highest, the categories are A, B, CD, DE, FG, GH, I and J.

== Rankings ==
In 2025, Zane North and Tatem elementary schools were ranked among the top ten performing elementary schools in Camden County, while Collingswood High School was ranked 10th among high schools in the county, according to Niche.

== Schools ==
Schools in the district (with 2024–25 enrollment data from the National Center for Education Statistics) are:

Preschool

- Collingswood Preschool with NA students at Parkview and 43 at Oaklyn in PreK

Elementary schools

- James A. Garfield Elementary School with 128 students in grades K-5 (closed June 2026)
  - Mark Wiltsey, principal
- Mark Newbie Elementary School with 136 students in grades K-5
  - Steven Smith, principal
- Thomas Sharp Elementary School with 211 students in grades PreK-5
  - Kamilah Hinson, principal
- William P. Tatem Elementary School with 248 students in grades K-5
  - Brian Kulak, principal
- Zane North Elementary School with 174 students in grades K-5
  - Thomas Santo, principal

Middle school

- Collingswood Middle School with 446 students in grades 6-8
  - David Olivieri, interim principal

High school

- Collingswood High School with 761 students in grades 9-12
  - Doug Newman, principal

== Administration ==
Core members of the district's administration are:

- Fredrick McDowell, superintendent
- Beth Ann Coleman, business administrator and board secretary
- Regan Kaiden, president of the Collingswood Board of Education

== Board of education ==
The district's board of education, comprised of nine elected members, sets policy and oversees the fiscal and educational operation of the district through its administration. As a Type II school district, the board's trustees are elected directly by voters to serve three-year terms of office on a staggered basis, with three seats up for election each year held (since 2012) as part of the November general election. The board appoints a superintendent to oversee the district's day-to-day operations and a business administrator to supervise the business functions of the district. Oaklyn and Woodlynne each have a representative appointed to serve on the Collingswood district board to represent the interests of their respective district.

== Programs ==
In November 1994, the International Educational Systems (IES) Language Foundation was scheduled to begin an afterschool language program for students of the Collingswood district in the 2nd through 6th grades. For a $36 monthly fee students could take Spanish or French classes. They were to be held for one hour once per week.
