= Woodlynne School District =

SWchool district in Camden County, New Jersey, US

Address
- 131 Elm Avenue Woodlynne, Camden County, New Jersey, 08107
- Coordinates: 39.919553°N 75.094059°W

District information
- Grades: PreK-8
- Superintendent: Jackie Walters
- Business administrator: Greg Gontowski
- Schools: 1

Students and staff
- Enrollment: 388 (as of 2022–23)
- Faculty: 37.8 FTEs
- Student–teacher ratio: 10.3:1

Other information
- District Factor Group: B
- Website: www.woodlynne.k12.nj.us
Ind.	Per pupil	District spending	Rank (*)	K-8 average	%± vs. average
1A	Total Spending	$15,862	9	$18,891	−16.0%
1	Budgetary Cost	10,504	2	14,159	−25.8%
2	Classroom Instruction	6,507	3	8,659	−24.9%
6	Support Services	1,357	4	2,167	−37.4%
8	Administrative Cost	1,652	32	1,547	6.8%
10	Operations & Maintenance	937	4	1,612	−41.9%
13	Extracurricular Activities	51	12	104	−51.0%
Data from NJDoE 2014 Taxpayers' Guide to Education Spending. *Of K-8 districts with 401-750 students. Lowest spending=1; Highest=64

The Woodlynne School District is a community public school district that serves students in pre-kindergarten through eighth grade from Woodlynne, in Camden County, in the U.S. state of New Jersey.

As of the 2022–23 school year, the district, comprised of one school, had an enrollment of 388 students and 37.8 classroom teachers (on an FTE basis), for a student–teacher ratio of 10.3:1.

The district is classified by the New Jersey Department of Education as being in District Factor Group "B", the second-lowest of eight groupings. District Factor Groups organize districts statewide to allow comparison by common socioeconomic characteristics of the local districts. From lowest socioeconomic status to highest, the categories are A, B, CD, DE, FG, GH, I and J.

Students in public school for ninth through twelfth grades attend Collingswood High School in neighboring Collingswood as part of a sending/receiving relationship with the Collingswood Public Schools, together with students from Oaklyn, New Jersey. As of the 2022–23 school year, the high school had an enrollment of 809 students and 67.0 classroom teachers (on an FTE basis), for a student–teacher ratio of 12.1:1.

== School ==
Woodlynne Public School served 383 students in grades PreK-8 in the 2022–23 school year. The school had an enrollment of 382 students in the 2014–15 school year.

== Administration ==
Core members of the district's administration are:

- Jackie Walters, superintendent and principal
- Greg Gontowski, business administrator

== Board of education ==
The district's board of education, comprised of seven members, sets policy and oversees the fiscal and educational operation of the district through its administration. As a Type II school district, the board's trustees are elected directly by voters to serve three-year terms of office on a staggered basis, with either two or three seats up for election each year held (since 2012) as part of the November general election. The board appoints a superintendent to oversee the district's day-to-day operations and a business administrator to supervise the business functions of the district.
