= Tom Deery =

American football player (born 1960)

Profile
- Position: Safety

Personal information
- Born: February 4, 1960 (age 66); Oaklyn, New Jersey, U.S.

Career information
- College: Widener University
- NFL draft: 1982: 10th round, 252nd overall pick
- College Football Hall of Fame

Tom Deery (born February 4, 1960) is an American former football safety. He was elected to the College Football Hall of Fame in 1998.
