= Helen Van Pelt Wilson =

American garden writer

- Born: Helen Van Pelt Wilson; October 19, 1901; Collingswood, New Jersey, United States
- Died: September 30, 2003 (aged 101); Wilton, Connecticut, United States
- Resting place: Colestown Cemetery
- Occupation: Garden writer

Helen Van Pelt Wilson (October 19, 1901 – September 30, 2003) was a twentieth-century American garden writer.

== Early life ==
Helen Van Pelt Wilson was born in Collingswood, New Jersey, and attended the Shipley School to prepare for Bryn Mawr College. She graduated cum laude from Bryn Mawr in 1923. Wilson taught English and Latin at Mount Holly High School for one year, and in 1924 married Arthur Collins, Jr. She created her first garden at their home in Moorestown, New Jersey.

== Writing career ==
Wilson began writing about houseplants and gardens for the Philadelphia Record. For Parents Magazine, she wrote about education, marriage and parenting. Over the course of her writing career, Helen Wilson contributed to Cosmopolitan, Good Housekeeping, Scribner's, House Beautiful, House and Garden, Flower Grower, and Better Homes and Gardens. Wilson collaborated with New York Times Garden Editor Dorothy Jenkins in 1942 on her second book on houseplants. She became an executive editor for nonfiction books at M. Barrows and Company in New York City, specializing in gardening books. She also worked as an editor for Morrow, D. Van Nostrand, and Hawthorn Books.

Wilson also wrote many books of her own. Among the most well-known are Perennials Preferred, Joy of Geraniums, The Fragrant Year, with Leonie Bell, Houseplants are for Pleasure, and Successful Gardening in the Shade. Perhaps her most famous book was The African Violet, published in 1948. Wilson wrote a book about her own garden at Stony Brook Cottage in Westport, Connecticut in 1973, Helen Van Pelt Wilson's Own Garden and Landscape Book. In 1978, she published her twentieth book, Color for Your Winter Yard and Garden. She wrote, "Apparently I am the last friend that winter has; it is the season I most enjoy."

In addition to her many books and articles, Wilson compiled The Garden Calendar and The Flower Arrangement Calendar for twenty years. She also compiled two books of poetry, The Gardener's Book of Verses and Joyful Thoughts for Five Seasons.

== Death ==
Helen Van Pelt Wilson died in Wilton, Connecticut, on September 30, 2003. She was buried in Colestown Cemetery in Cherry Hill, New Jersey. At the time of her death, Wilson had one daughter, Cynthia, two grandchildren, and two great-grandchildren.

== Legacy ==
Helen Wilson was listed in Who's Who of American Women and Foremost Women in Communications. She was a fellow of the Royal Horticultural Society of Great Britain and a recipient of a Bronze Medal Award from the African Violet Society of America.

The Library of Congress lists 51 books written or edited by Helen Van Pelt Wilson. Several of the books were updated and multiple editions exist of some titles.

== Books written ==
Books written, compiled, or co-authored by Helen Van Pelt Wilson include:

- Helen Van Pelt Wilson's Own Garden and Landscape Book
- The Joy of Geraniums
- Successful gardening with perennials: How to select and grow more than 500 kinds for today's yard & garden
- Houseplants are for pleasure;: How to grow healthy plants for home decoration
- Flowers, space, and motion: New designs in hanging flower arrangements
- Houseplants for every window
- Successful Gardening in the Shade
- Color for Your Winter Yard & Garden With Flowers, Berries, Birds, and Trees
- Joyful Thoughts for Five Seasons, with Lydia Rosier
- The African Violet, with Leonie Hagerty
- Helen Van Pelt Wilson's African-violet book
- The Joy of Flower Arranging
- Perennials preferred, with Kathleen Voute
- The Fragrant Year, Scented Plants for Your Garden and Your House, with Leonie Bell
- African Violet and Generiad Questions-Answered By 20 Experts, Editor HVP Wilson
- Poems for Five Seasons (The Gardener's Book of Verse, Volume One) Editor HVP Wilson
- Geraniums Pelargoniums
- The Flower Arrangement Calendar
- Gloxinias And How To Grow Them by Peggie Schulz, Helen Van Pelt Wilson and A. H. Buell
- Flower arrangement designs for today
- A Garden in the House
