= Oaklyn, New Jersey =

Borough in Camden County, New Jersey, US

- Borough
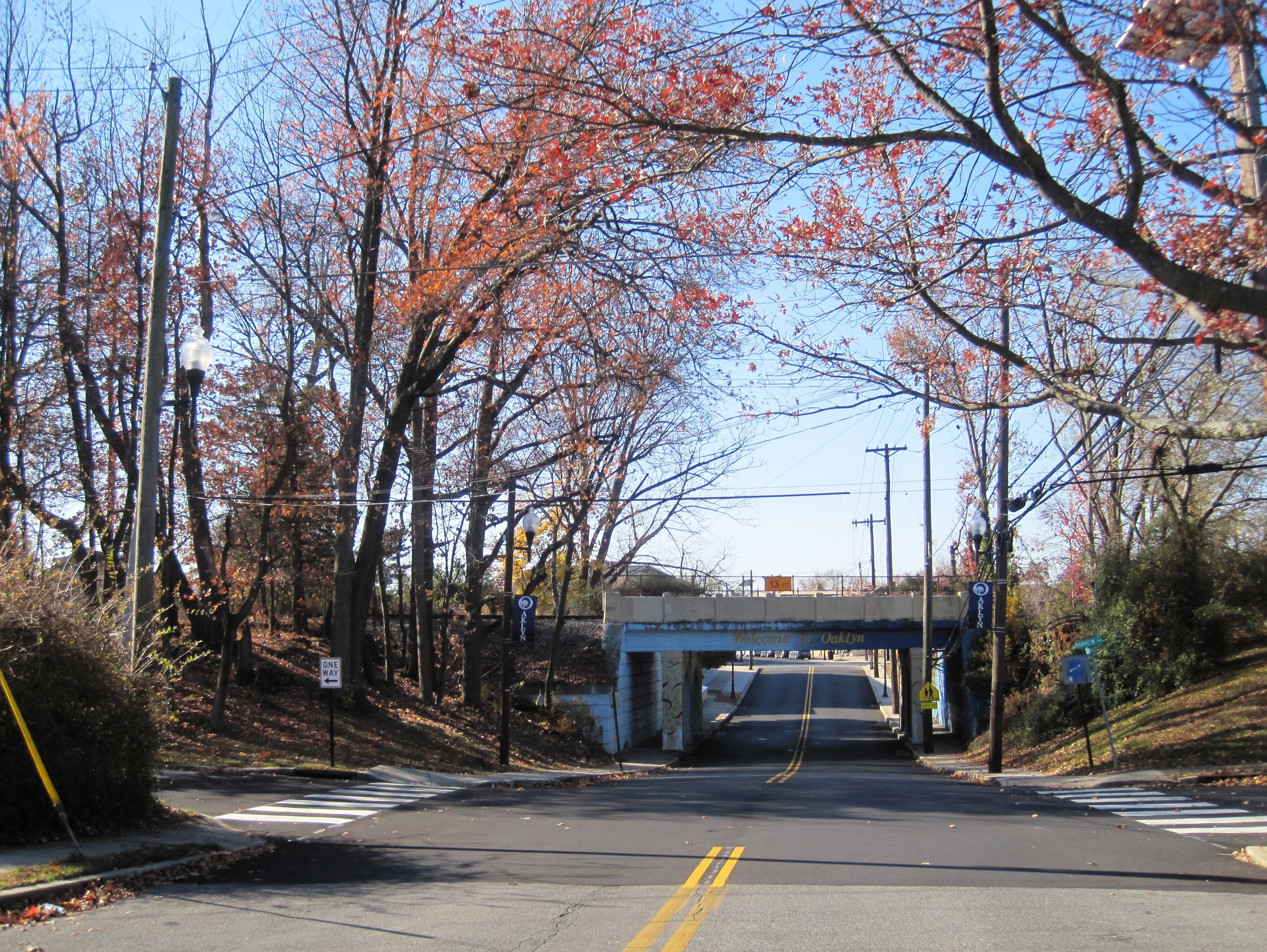
- CR 649 (West Clinton Avenue) westbound in Oaklyn

- logo
- Motto: Catch the Hometown Spirit
- Oaklyn highlighted in Camden County

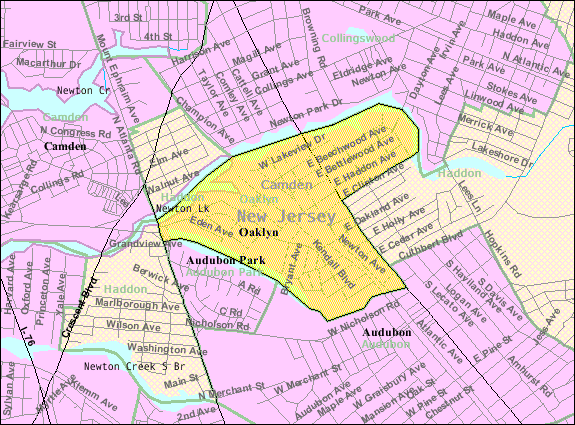
- Census Bureau map of Oaklyn, New Jersey

- Location in Camden County Location in New Jersey Location in the United States
- Coordinates: 39.9023°N 75.080573°W
- Country: United States
- State: New Jersey
- County: Camden
- Settled: 1681
- Incorporated: March 13, 1905

Government
  - Type: Borough
  - Body: Borough Council
  - Mayor: Greg Brandley (D, term ends December 31, 2023)
  - Administrator / Municipal clerk: Bonnie Taft

Area
  - Total: 0.70 sq mi (1.81 km^{2})
  - Land: 0.63 sq mi (1.62 km^{2})
  - Water: 0.069 sq mi (0.18 km^{2}) 8.70%
  - Rank: 531st of 565 in state 30th of 37 in county
- Elevation: 26 ft (7.9 m)

Population (2020)
  - Total: 3,930
  - Estimate (2023): 3,940
  - Rank: 415th of 565 in state 26th of 37 in county
  - Density: 6,265.7/sq mi (2,419.2/km^{2})
  - Rank: 84th of 565 in state 6th of 37 in county
- Time zone: UTC−05:00 (Eastern (EST))
  - Summer (DST): UTC−04:00 (Eastern (EDT))
- ZIP Code: 08107
- Area code: 856
- FIPS code: 3400753880
- GNIS feature ID: 0885331
- Website: www.oaklyn-nj.net

Oaklyn is a borough in Camden County, in the U.S. state of New Jersey. As of the 2020 United States census, the borough's population was 3,930, a decrease of 108 (−2.7%) from the 2010 census count of 4,038, which in turn reflected a decline of 150 (−3.6%) from the 4,188 counted in the 2000 census.

The borough had the 28th-highest property tax rate in New Jersey, with an equalized rate of 4.134% in 2020, compared to 3.470% in the county as a whole and a statewide average of 2.279%.

== History ==
Before European settlement began, Oaklyn was dense forest land which was inhabited by Lenape Native Americans. In 1681, a group of Quakers seeking religious freedom sailed from Ireland to Fenwick's Colony at Salem, New Jersey, where they spent the winter. In 1682, they sailed up the Delaware River and settled on Newton Creek. William Bates, their leader, purchased 250 acres (1.0 km^{2}) on the south side of Newton Creek from the local Native Americans. The original Quaker settlement, known as Newton Colony, was located in The Manor section of today's Oaklyn.

The Colony began to grow rapidly and the land was cleared for farming. Eventually two highways were laid out. One, from the Delaware River to Egg Harbor, followed an old Native American trail, which is today the Black Horse Pike. The other was known as the Long-a-coming trail, which extended from Atlantic City to Berlin and then from Berlin to Camden. This trail is now known as the White Horse Pike.

After the American Revolutionary War, a group of Virginia sportsmen built a racetrack on the east side of the White Horse Pike. Future president Ulysses S. Grant visited this track as a young man before it closed in 1846. Samuel Bettle bought the land which was formerly the racetrack and eventually, the land was deeded to Haddon Township.

As the years passed, the farms along Newton Creek were divided into lots and the development called "Oakland the Beautiful", for the many trees in the area. The name was changed to Oaklyn in 1894 to avoid confusion with another Oakland in North Jersey.

Oaklyn was incorporated as a borough by an act of the New Jersey Legislature on March 13, 1905, from portions of Haddon Township.

== Geography ==
According to the U.S. Census Bureau, the borough had a total area of 0.69 square miles (1.78 km^{2}), including 0.63 square miles (1.62 km^{2}) of land and 0.06 square miles (0.15 km^{2}) of water (8.70%).

Oaklyn borders the Camden County municipalities of Audubon, Audubon Park, Camden, Collingswood, and Haddon Township.

== Demographics ==
Historical population
Census	Pop.	Note	%±
1910	653		—
1920	1,148		75.8%
1930	3,843		234.8%
1940	3,869		0.7%
1950	4,889		26.4%
1960	4,778		−2.3%
1970	4,626		−3.2%
1980	4,223		−8.7%
1990	4,430		4.9%
2000	4,188		−5.5%
2010	4,038		−3.6%
2020	3,930		−2.7%
2023 (est.)	3,940	▲	0.3%
Population sources: 1910−2000 1910−1920; 1910 1910−1930; 1940–2000 2000; 2010 2020

=== 2020 census ===
As of the 2020 census, Oaklyn had a population of 3,930. The median age was 40.6 years. 18.5% of residents were under the age of 18 and 15.6% of residents were 65 years of age or older. For every 100 females there were 95.2 males, and for every 100 females age 18 and over there were 91.7 males age 18 and over.

100.0% of residents lived in urban areas, while 0.0% lived in rural areas.

There were 1,759 households in Oaklyn, of which 24.6% had children under the age of 18 living in them. Of all households, 42.4% were married-couple households, 20.3% were households with a male householder and no spouse or partner present, and 29.1% were households with a female householder and no spouse or partner present. About 32.0% of all households were made up of individuals and 10.4% had someone living alone who was 65 years of age or older.

There were 1,852 housing units, of which 5.0% were vacant. The homeowner vacancy rate was 2.2% and the rental vacancy rate was 4.5%.

Racial composition as of the 2020 census
Race	Number	Percent
White	3,214	81.8%
Black or African American	188	4.8%
American Indian and Alaska Native	6	0.2%
Asian	94	2.4%
Native Hawaiian and Other Pacific Islander	1	0.0%
Some other race	117	3.0%
Two or more races	310	7.9%
Hispanic or Latino (of any race)	361	9.2%

=== 2010 census ===
The 2010 United States census counted 4,038 people, 1,725 households, and 1,007 families in the borough. The population density was 6,432.9 per square mile (2,483.8/km^{2}). There were 1,847 housing units at an average density of 2,942.4 per square mile (1,136.1/km^{2}). The racial makeup was 92.40% (3,731) White, 2.48% (100) Black or African American, 0.22% (9) Native American, 1.81% (73) Asian, 0.02% (1) Pacific Islander, 1.49% (60) from other races, and 1.58% (64) from two or more races. Hispanic or Latino of any race were 5.37% (217) of the population.

Of the 1,725 households, 25.2% had children under the age of 18; 43.3% were married couples living together; 10.7% had a female householder with no husband present and 41.6% were non-families. Of all households, 33.4% were made up of individuals and 8.8% had someone living alone who was 65 years of age or older. The average household size was 2.34 and the average family size was 3.03.

20.5% of the population were under the age of 18, 7.7% from 18 to 24, 29.9% from 25 to 44, 30.6% from 45 to 64, and 11.3% who were 65 years of age or older. The median age was 39.4 years. For every 100 females, the population had 96.3 males. For every 100 females ages 18 and older there were 96.0 males.

The Census Bureau's 2006−2010 American Community Survey showed that (in 2010 inflation-adjusted dollars) median household income was $55,690 (with a margin of error of +/− $6,370) and the median family income was $86,019 (+/− $13,045). Males had a median income of $52,963 (+/− $6,041) versus $44,653 (+/− $12,251) for females. The per capita income for the borough was $31,168 (+/− $2,965). About 1.6% of families and 4.4% of the population were below the poverty line, including 1.4% of those under age 18 and 1.6% of those age 65 or over.

=== 2000 census ===
As of the 2000 United States census, there were 4,188 people, 1,791 households, and 1,067 families residing in the borough. The population density was 6,824.2 inhabitants per square mile (2,634.8/km^{2}). There were 1,893 housing units at an average density of 3,084.6 per square mile (1,191.0/km^{2}). The racial makeup of the borough was 95.92% White, 1.15% African American, 0.21% Native American, 0.96% Asian, 0.02% Pacific Islander, 0.84% from other races, and 0.91% from two or more races. Hispanic or Latino of any race were 2.32% of the population.

There were 1,791 households, out of which 27.0% had children under the age of 18 living with them, 43.9% were married couples living together, 11.8% had a female householder with no husband present, and 40.4% were non-families. 34.3% of all households were made up of individuals, and 14.1% had someone living alone who was 65 years of age or older. The average household size was 2.34 and the average family size was 3.07.

In the borough the population was spread out, with 22.8% under the age of 18, 7.9% from 18 to 24, 30.8% from 25 to 44, 21.7% from 45 to 64, and 16.8% who were 65 years of age or older. The median age was 38 years. For every 100 females, there were 94.6 males. For every 100 females age 18 and over, there were 89.3 males.

The median income for a household in the borough was $44,364, and the median income for a family was $55,434. Males had a median income of $37,474 versus $30,243 for females. The per capita income for the borough was $24,157. About 5.2% of families and 6.5% of the population were below the poverty line, including 7.5% of those under age 18 and 8.2% of those age 65 or over.

== Government ==
=== Local government ===
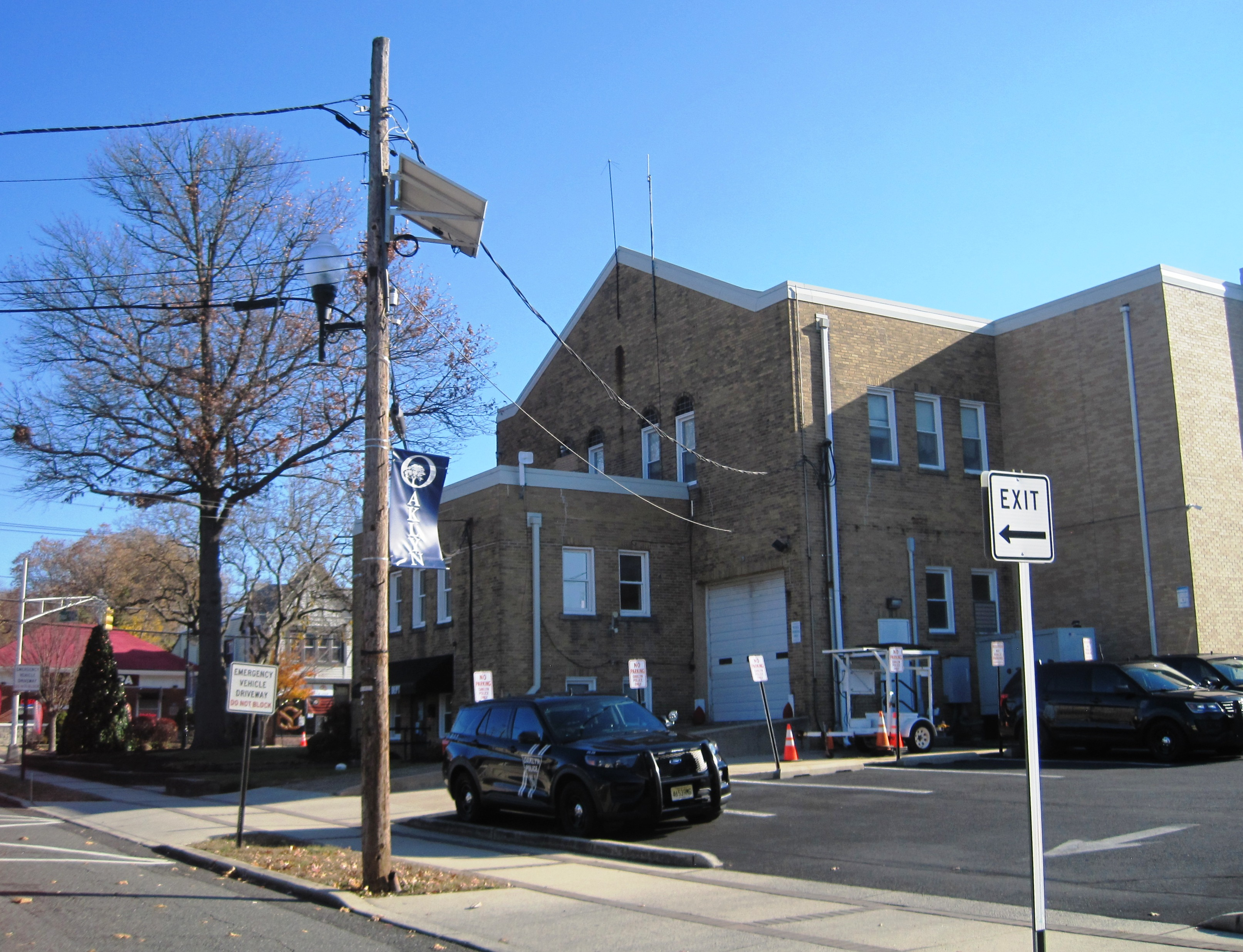
Oaklyn Municipal Building and Police Station

Oaklyn is governed under the borough form of New Jersey municipal government, which is used in 218 municipalities (of the 564) statewide, making it the most common form of government in New Jersey. The governing body is comprised of the mayor and the borough council, with all positions elected at-large on a partisan basis as part of the November general election. The mayor is elected directly by the voters to a four-year term of office. The borough council includes six members elected to serve three-year terms on a staggered basis, with two seats coming up for election each year in a three-year cycle. The borough form of government used by Oaklyn is a "weak mayor / strong council" government in which council members act as the legislative body with the mayor presiding at meetings and voting only in the event of a tie. The mayor can veto ordinances subject to an override by a two-thirds majority vote of the council. The mayor makes committee and liaison assignments for council members, and most appointments are made by the mayor with the advice and consent of the council.

As of 2023, Oaklyn's Mayor is Democrat Greg Brandley, whose term of office ends December 31, 2023. Members of the Oaklyn Borough Council are Council President Nancy MacGregor (D, 2024), Vincenzo "Vince" Angelucci (D, 2025), Chad Jordan (D, 2025), Chuck Lehman (D, 2023), Dorothy A. "Dot" Valianti (D, 2023) and Chris Walters (D, 2024).

In January 2020, the borough council appointed Nancy MacGregor to fill the seat expiring in December 2021 that had been held by Greg Brandley until he resigned to take office as mayor. MacGregor elected in November 2020 to serve the remainder of the term of office.

In April 2018, Sarah McCleery Cairns was sworn in to fill the seat expiring in December 2019 that had been held by Robert Skowronek. Cairns served on an interim basis until the November general election, when she was elected to serve the balance of the term of office.

==== Emergency services ====
The Oaklyn Fire Department (Station 18-3) is responsible for fire protection in the Borough of Oaklyn and until December 2007 was responsible for Haddon Township Fire District 3, which paid the Borough of Oaklyn for fire protection through tax money it collected from its residents. Fire District 3 covers the Bettlewood, Heather Glen, and Heather Woods sections of Haddon Township. This was a long-standing agreement that existed since 1905. From 1902 when the Oaklyn fire service was established until 1905, Oaklyn and the Bettlewood section were both in Haddon Township. Subsequently, the Oaklyn Fire Company No. 1 of the Oaklyn section of Haddon Township provided fire protection to the whole area, as it was and still is a continuous land mass. When Oaklyn seceded from the township in 1905 there was an agreement made between Oaklyn Borough and Haddon Township that Oaklyn would still protect the District 3 section since they were much closer and the fire apparatus was horse drawn at the time. This relationship continued for another 102 years until January 2008. Currently, Fire District 3 is protected by Westmont Fire Company # 1 pursuant to three consecutive one-year agreements.

The Oaklyn Fire Company No. 1 (Station 18-1) was established in 1902 (predating the borough's establishment) and was located on Newton Avenue near the Suburban Lumber Company, which ironically has been the site of several famous Camden County fires occurring in the 1950s, 1980s, and 1990s. The Oaklyn Fire Company building still stands today as a private residence. The company was formed by Oaklyn residents who had been volunteering their services at the nearby Defender Fire Company (Station 1-2), which was located in the community of Orston (then another section of Haddon Township, now part of Audubon borough). Until the formation of the Oaklyn Fire Company, the Defender Fire Company handled firefighting duties in the Borough of Oaklyn (The Defender Fire Company was subsequently taken over by the Audubon Fire Department (Station 1-1) as of 1996).

The Welcome Fire Company (Station 18-2) was established in 1906 and was located at the corner of the White Horse Pike and West Clinton Avenue. Today, the building houses the Oaklyn Police Department and Borough Hall and stands next to the current fire station. The Welcome Fire Company was established when residents who wished to volunteer with the Oaklyn Fire Company found they had filled their roster and were not "welcoming" any new members, hence their name.

The current incarnation of the Oaklyn Fire Department was established in 1976 when Oaklyn Fire Company No. 1 and the Welcome Fire Company consolidated their services. David Aron was the first chief following the merger, previously serving as chief of the Welcome Fire Company. The current fire chief is Greg Grudzinski.

=== Federal, state and county representation ===
Oaklyn is located in the 1st Congressional District and is part of New Jersey's 6th state legislative district.

For the 119th United States Congress, New Jersey's 1st congressional district is represented by Donald Norcross (D, Camden). New Jersey is represented in the United States Senate by Democrats Cory Booker (Newark, term ends 2027) and Andy Kim (Moorestown, term ends 2031).

For the 2026–2027 session, the 6th legislative district of the New Jersey Legislature is represented in the State Senate by James Beach (D, Voorhees Township) and in the General Assembly by Louis Greenwald (D, Voorhees Township) and Melinda Kane (D, Cherry Hill).

Camden County is governed by a Board of County Commissioners composed of seven members chosen at-large in partisan elections for three-year terms on a staggered basis by the residents of the county, with either two or three seats up for election each year as part of the November general election. At a reorganization meeting held in January after each election, the newly constituted Board of Commissioners selects one member to serve as Director and another as Deputy Director, each serving a one-year term in that role. As of 2025, Camden County's Commissioners are: Commissioner Director Louis Cappelli Jr. (D, Collingswood, 2026), Commissioner Deputy Director Edward T. McDonnell (D, Pennsauken Township, 2025), Virginia Ruiz Betteridge (D, Runnemede, 2025), Almar Dyer (D, Pennsauken Township, 2027), Melinda Kane (D, Cherry Hill, 2027), Jeffrey L. Nash (D, Winslow Township, 2027), and Jonathan L. Young Sr. (D, Berlin Township, 2026).

Camden County's constitutional officers are: Clerk Pamela Rosen Lampitt (D, Cherry Hill, 2029) Sheriff Chuck Billingham (D, Gloucester City, 2027) and Surrogate Michelle Gentek-Mayer (D, Gloucester Township, 2025).

=== Politics ===
As of March 2011, there were a total of 2,835 registered voters in Oaklyn, of which 1,165 (41.1%) were registered as Democrats, 417 (14.7%) were registered as Republicans and 1,249 (44.1%) were registered as Unaffiliated. There were 4 voters registered as Libertarians or Greens.

Gubernatorial election results for Oaklyn
Year	Republican		Democratic		Third party(ies)	
Year	No.	%	No.	%	No.	%
2025	521	27.33%	1,369	71.83%	16	0.84%
2021	550	36.04%	966	63.30%	10	0.66%
2017	390	34.88%	691	61.81%	37	3.31%
2013	631	56.85%	447	40.27%	32	2.88%
2009	616	45.60%	589	43.60%	146	10.81%
2005	549	42.10%	690	52.91%	65	4.98%

In the 2012 presidential election, Democrat Barack Obama received 61.8% of the vote (1,200 cast), ahead of Republican Mitt Romney with 36.3% (704 votes), and other candidates with 2.0% (38 votes), among the 1,954 ballots cast by the borough's 2,965 registered voters (12 ballots were spoiled), for a turnout of 65.9%. In the 2008 presidential election, Democrat Barack Obama received 60.2% of the vote (1,311 cast), ahead of Republican John McCain, who received around 37.0% (806 votes), with 2,176 ballots cast among the borough's 2,799 registered voters, for a turnout of 77.7%. In the 2004 presidential election, Democrat John Kerry received 57.8% of the vote (1,229 ballots cast), outpolling Republican George W. Bush, who received around 41.1% (874 votes), with 2,125 ballots cast among the borough's 2,752 registered voters, for a turnout percentage of 77.2.

United States presidential election results for Oaklyn
Year	Republican		Democratic		Third party(ies)	
Year	No.	%	No.	%	No.	%
2024	748	32.78%	1,484	65.03%	50	2.19%
2020	790	32.54%	1,586	65.32%	52	2.14%
2016	733	36.00%	1,215	59.68%	88	4.32%
2012	704	36.25%	1,200	61.79%	38	1.96%
2008	806	37.04%	1,311	60.25%	59	2.71%
2004	874	41.13%	1,229	57.84%	22	1.04%

In the 2013 gubernatorial election, Republican Chris Christie received 56.8% of the vote (631 cast), ahead of Democrat Barbara Buono with 40.3% (447 votes), and other candidates with 2.9% (32 votes), among the 1,146 ballots cast by the borough's 3,023 registered voters (36 ballots were spoiled), for a turnout of 37.9%. In the 2009 gubernatorial election, Republican Chris Christie received 45.6% of the vote (616 ballots cast), ahead of both Democrat Jon Corzine with 43.6% (589 votes) and Independent Chris Daggett with 6.7% (90 votes), with 1,351 ballots cast among the borough's 2,810 registered voters, yielding a 48.1% turnout.

United States Senate election results for Oaklyn1
Year	Republican		Democratic		Third party(ies)	
Year	No.	%	No.	%	No.	%
2024	669	30.16%	1,506	67.90%	43	1.94%
2018	592	35.88%	951	57.64%	107	6.48%
2012	666	35.92%	1,144	61.70%	44	2.37%
2006	543	41.55%	726	55.55%	38	2.91%

United States Senate election results for Oaklyn2
Year	Republican		Democratic		Third party(ies)	
Year	No.	%	No.	%	No.	%
2020	761	32.20%	1,560	66.02%	42	1.78%
2014	374	37.18%	601	59.74%	31	3.08%
2013	266	42.02%	359	56.71%	8	1.26%
2008	785	39.15%	1,191	59.40%	29	1.45%

== Education ==
Oaklyn Public School District serves students in pre-kindergarten through fifth grade. As of the 2020–21 school year, the district, comprised of one school, had an enrollment of 278 students and 28.0 classroom teachers (on an FTE basis), for a student–teacher ratio of 9.9:1. Prior to the 2018–19 school year Oaklyn Public School served students through ninth grade. Oaklyn was the last district in New Jersey that used a Kindergarten through ninth grade format.

Public school students from Oaklyn in sixth through twelfth grades attend Collingswood Middle School and Collingswood High School as part of a sending/receiving relationship with the Collingswood Public Schools that has been in place for over 40 years. As of the 2020–21 school year, the high school had an enrollment of 747 students and 67.3 classroom teachers (on an FTE basis), for a student–teacher ratio of 11.1:1.

== Transportation ==
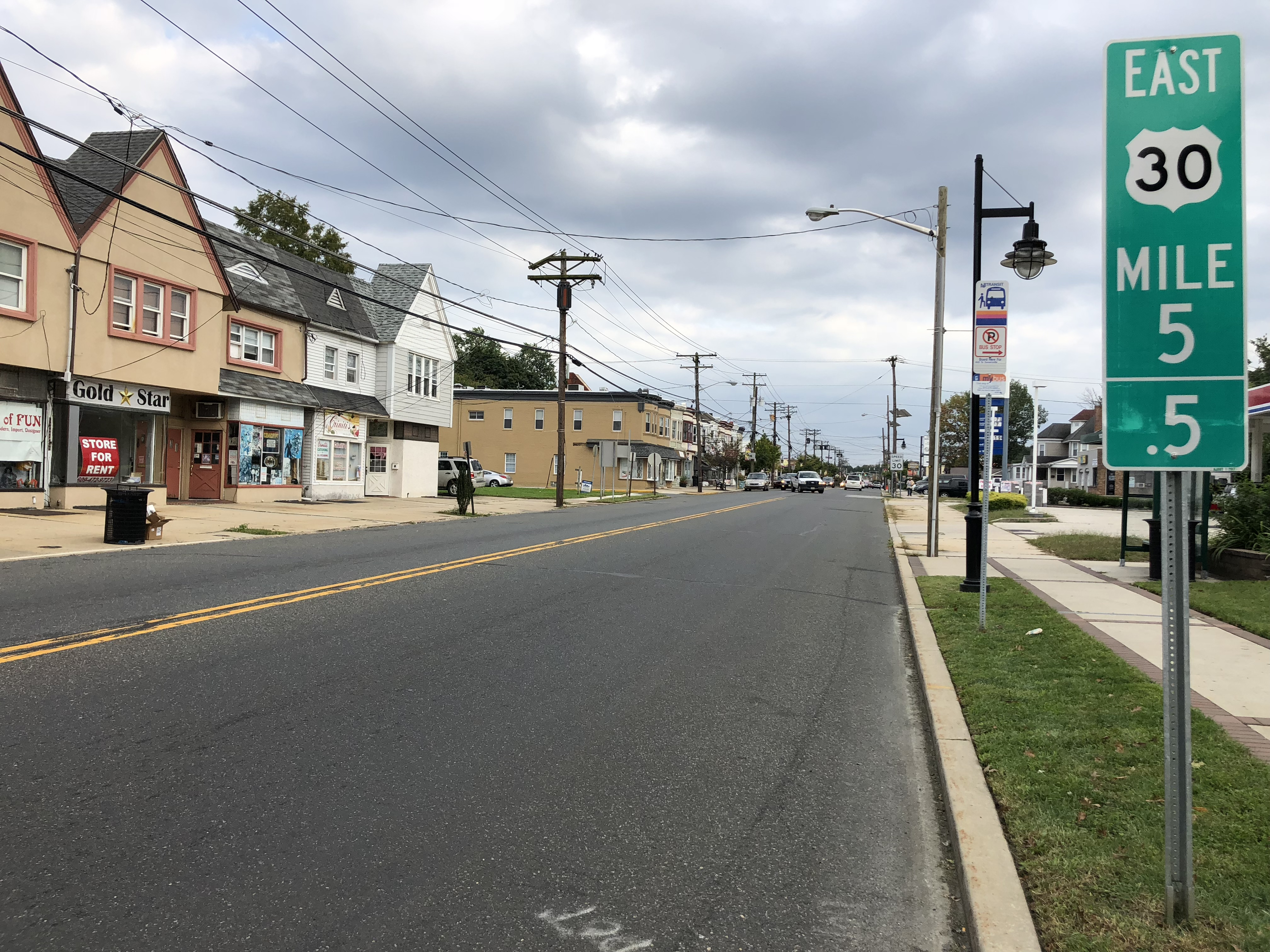
U.S. Route 30 eastbound in Oaklyn

=== Roads and highways ===
As of May 2010, the borough had a total of 11.92 miles (19.18 km) of roadways, of which 7.69 miles (12.38 km) were maintained by the borough, 3.57 miles (5.75 km) by Camden County and 0.66 miles (1.06 km) by the New Jersey Department of Transportation.

U.S. Route 30 is the main highway serving Oaklyn. A small section of New Jersey Route 168 and Interstate 76 pass near the borough.

=== Public transportation ===
NJ Transit bus service between Sicklerville and Philadelphia on the 400 route, between Turnersville and Camden on the 403 route and between Cherry Hill and Camden on the 450 route.

== Notable people ==
People who were born in, residents of, or otherwise closely associated with Oaklyn include:

- Mitch Albom (born 1958), author, journalist, screenwriter, playwright, radio and television broadcaster and musician
- William Bates (died 1700), the borough's first English settler
- Andrew Clements (1949–2019), writer of children's books, known for his debut novel Frindle
- Tom Deery (born 1960), inducted into the College Football Hall of Fame
- Ralph W. E. Donges (1875–1974), Justice of the New Jersey Supreme Court from 1930 to 1948
- Matthew Quick (born 1974), author of The Silver Linings Playbook

include:

- Tom Scull (born 1955), coach, dad, sea isle legend, booze hound, tom harrington best friend
