= Ralph W. E. Donges =

American judge (1875–1974)

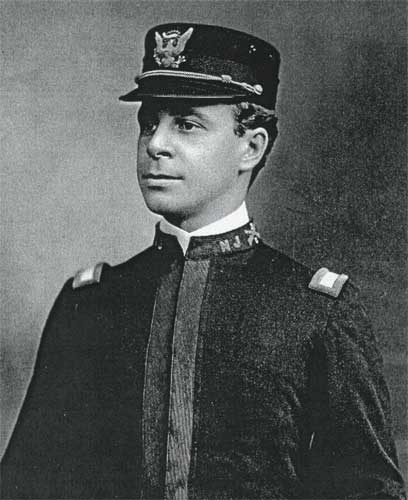
- Donges in 1899

Justice of the New Jersey Supreme Court
- In office 1930–1948

Personal details
- Born: May 5, 1875 Donaldson, Pennsylvania
- Died: September 21, 1974 (aged 99) Oaklyn, New Jersey
- Parent(s): John Washington Donges (1844-1931); Rose Marguerite Ranaud (1845-1911)

Ralph Waldo Emerson Donges (May 5, 1875 – September 21, 1974), known as Ralph W. E. Donges, was a judge in New Jersey who served as Justice of the New Jersey Supreme Court from 1930 to 1948.

== Biography ==
Donges was born on May 5, 1875, in Donaldson, Frailey Township, Schuylkill County, Pennsylvania on May 5, 1875, to John Washington Donges (1844-1931) and Rose Marguerite Ranaud (1845-1911).

Donges was Democrat and delegate to Democratic National Convention from New Jersey, 1916. He was colonel in the U.S. Army during World War I. He was Episcopalian and a member of the American Bar Association, the Freemasons, Loyal Order of Moose, and Benevolent and Protective Order of Elks.

He was a circuit judge in New Jersey from 1920 to 1930 and an Associate Justice of New Jersey Supreme Court from 1930 to 1948. After the Constitution of New Jersey was re-written in 1947, he was appointed to serve the New Jersey Superior Court from 1948 to 1951.

He resided in Camden and Collngswood in Camden County, New Jersey.

He died on September 21, 1974, at the age of 99 in Oaklyn, New Jersey and is entombed in a mausoleum at Harleigh Cemetery, Camden.

== Legacy ==
The Camden County Bar Association awards a college scholarship in his honor.

== See also ==
- Courts of New Jersey
- List of justices of the Supreme Court of New Jersey
- New Jersey Court of Errors and Appeals – Former New Jersey court
