= Perkins Center for the Arts =

Coordinates: 39.95972°N 74.95832°W

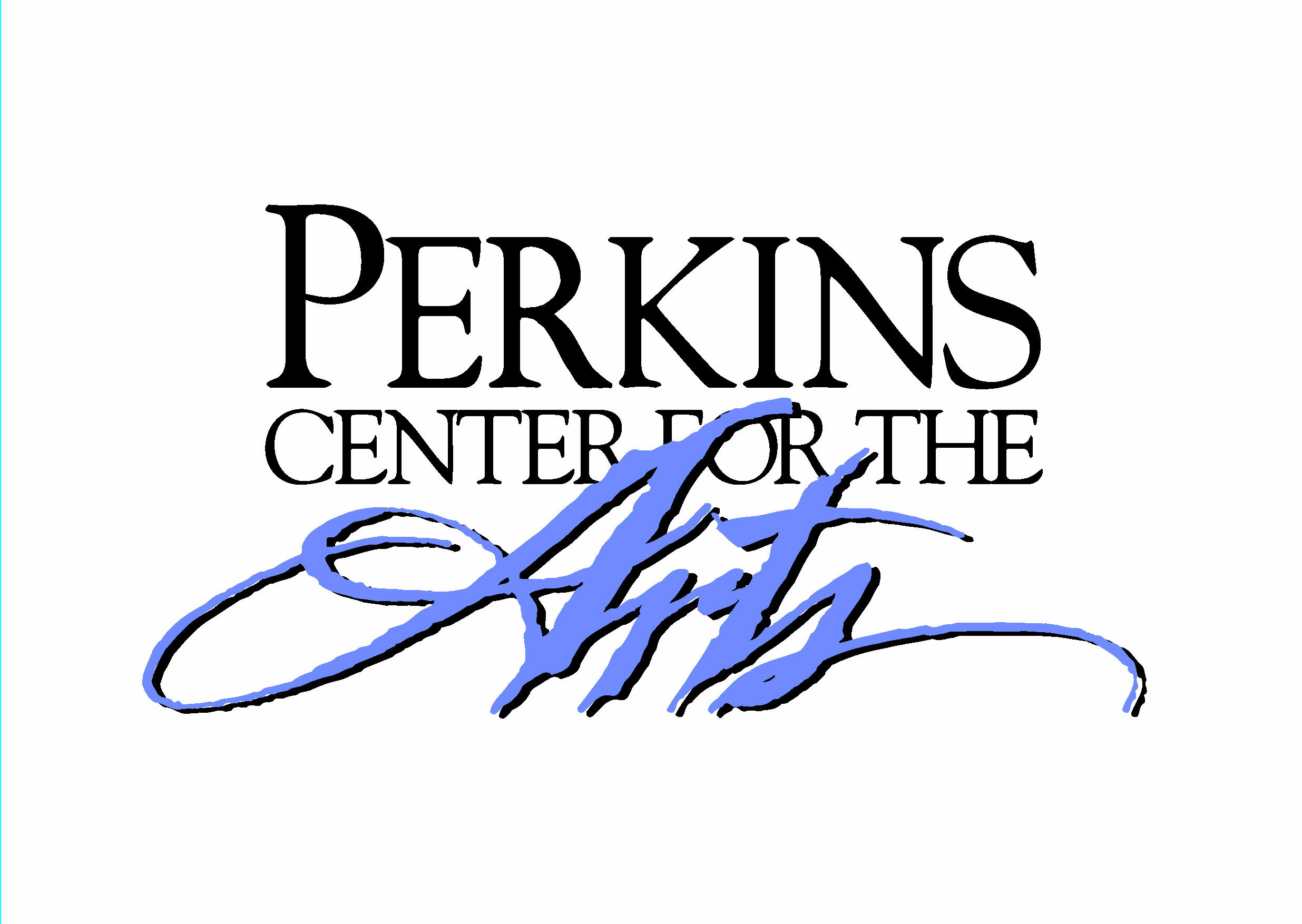
The logo of the Perkins Center for the Arts in South Jersey

Perkins Center for the Arts is a regional arts center serving southern New Jersey and beyond since 1977. Perkins operates from a 1910 historic Tudor home and carriage building in Moorestown, New Jersey, and a former printing press in Collingswood, New Jersey.Perkins Center offers arts programs that promote participation, and understanding.

== History ==
=== Moorestown location ===
==== 19th century ====
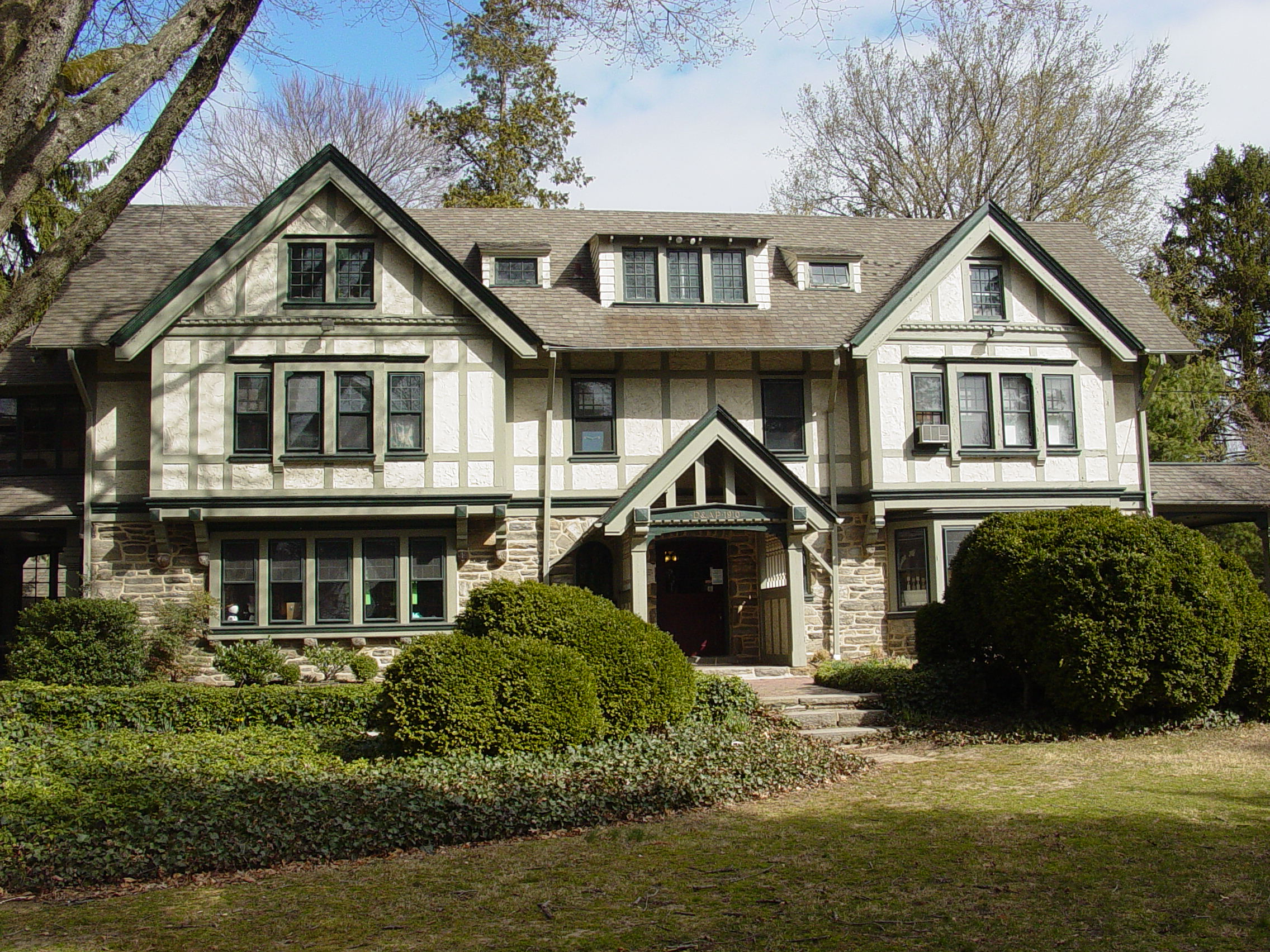
Perkins Center for the Arts in Moorestown, New Jersey

In 1815, the triangular piece of property that now includes Perkins Center for the Arts in Moorestown, New Jersey was established by Joseph French and John Perkins as the Fairview Nurseries. It later became known as Tan Yard Farm and then Pinehurst Farm. The property was utilized as a nursery specializing in ornamental trees. Some of the specimen trees on the property today are believed to be from this time.

==== 20th century ====
The home on the former nursery property was built in 1910 by Herbert C. Wise, a noted Philadelphia architect, as a wedding gift to Dudley and Alice Perkins. The home, named by the family as Evergreen Lawn, is built in the Tudor Revival style inspired by English manor homes of the 15th and 16th centuries. The front porch tie beam is inscribed "D&AP 1910", for Dudley and Alice Perkins and the date the house was built. At or around 1930, the carriage house was built in the Craftsman style, the lower level served as a garage and the upper level an apartment. The same year, the second level porch at the original home was enclosed into a sleeping porch.

Dudley died in 1918 of influenza during the epidemic that occurred soon after the Great War (WWI). The couple had one son, Thomas Haines Dudley Jr. Soon after T.H. Dudley Sr.’s death, Alice Perkins invited her sister, Mable (Sullivan) and husband Francis D’Olier to live with her at Evergreen Lawn. After Alice’s and Frank’s death and the death of Dudley, Jr. at the age of 48, Mabel (Sullivan) D’Olier was the sole occupant in the home. Mable purchased the home from Dudley Jr’s estate. Upon her death, the property and home were bequeathed to the Township of Moorestown to be used in perpetuity as a park or other suitable township purpose, Mable stipulated that the point of property between the house and where Kings Highway meets Camden Avenue be maintained as open space for the community and no buildings or structures should be placed on it, she stated that it be referred to as the Perkins Lawn.

In the early 1970s, the township was contemplating the sale or demolition of the historic building. Responding to this situation, a group of concerned Moorestown citizens including Sally Harrall, Jean Gaasch, Frank Keenan and Louis Matlack fought to save Evergreen Lawn and had the buildings listed on the National and State Registers of Historic Places in 1975. Thanks to community involvement and support, the township’s Recreational Advisory Committee recommended that the building be retained for use as a self-sustaining cultural arts center. Perkins Center for the Arts was created and was officially incorporated in 1977 as a non-profit community arts center serving the residents of Moorestown and the entire southern New Jersey region. Around this time, the remainder of the property was also designated as Open Space and in 1981, the 5.5 acre property was designated as an Arboretum.

==== 21st century ====
Perkins Center is currently operating under its second 25-year lease with the Township of Moorestown. In 2022, Perkins Center for the Arts received grants from the New Jersey Council of the Arts for general operations and for a project focusing on folk and traditional art.

=== Collingswood location ===
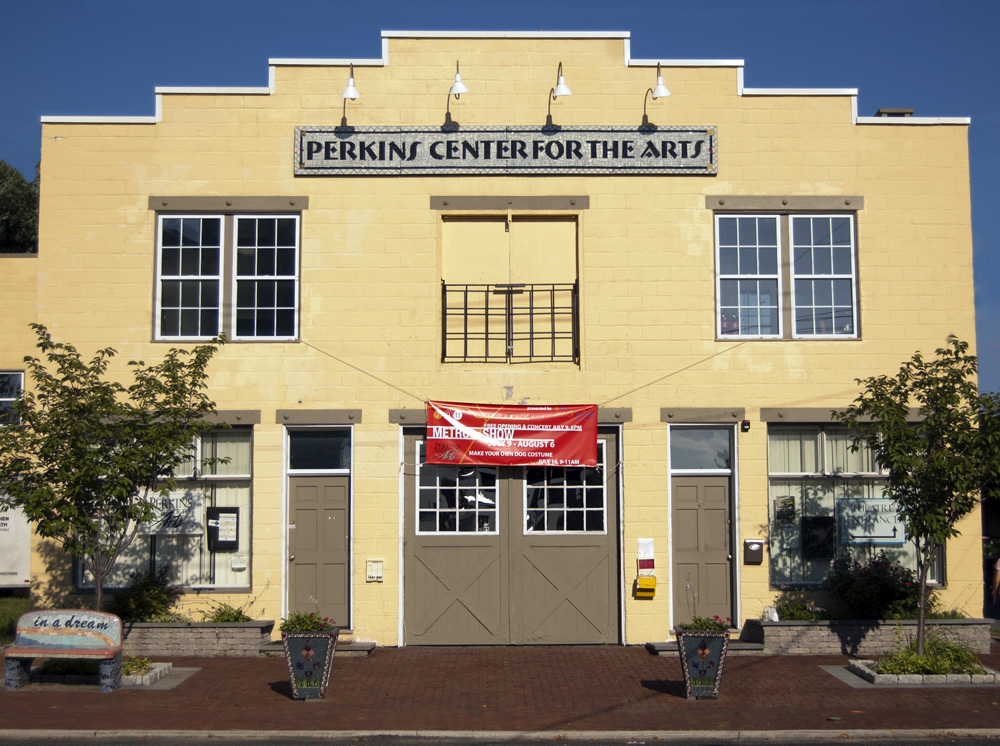
Perkins Center for the Arts in Collingswood, New Jersey

In 2002, Perkins expanded to a second facility in Collingswood, New Jersey.

== Programs at Perkins ==
The Center’s programs include:

- Studio classes in the visual arts for all ages
- An exhibition series which promotes and supports emerging and established artists
- A conservatory of music with individual and group music lessons
- A performance Series including classical Family Concerts and folk/contemporary Concerts
- An ARTS (Art Reaching The Students) residency program, which matches professional artists with schools for extended residencies in their respective disciplines
- A summer arts camp bringing urban and suburban youth together in a creative arts environment
- An out-of-school program for at-risk youth
- A mural and community gardens initiative in Camden, New Jersey
- A folklife center to document and engage ethnic groups and communities in the tri-county area, including Burlington, Camden and Gloucester counties in South Jersey.
