= Collingswood, New Jersey =

Borough in Camden County, New Jersey, US

- Borough
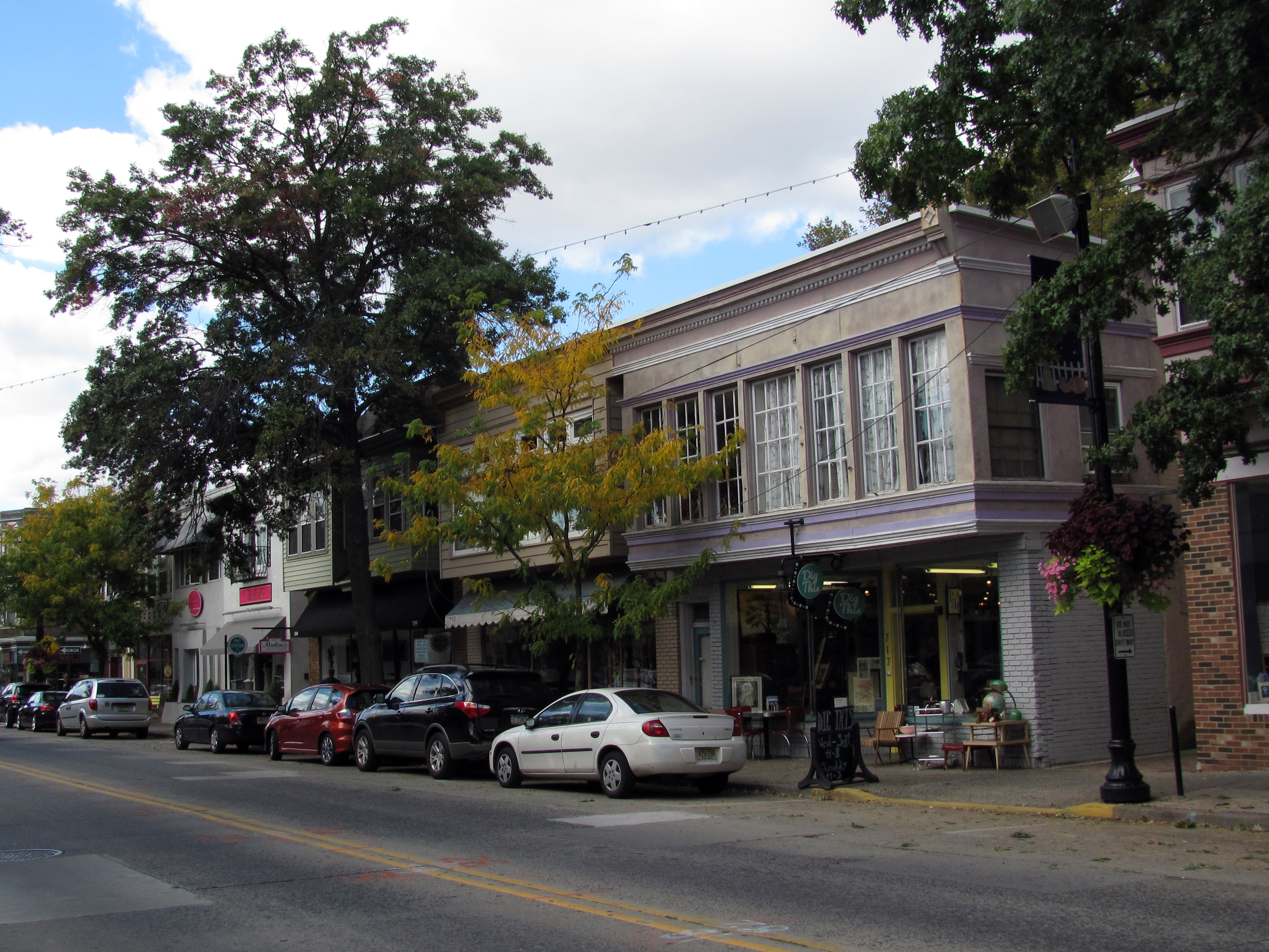
- Collingswood Commercial Historic District in September 2013

- Seal
- Motto: Fidelis in Omnibus (Faithful in all things)
- Location of Collingswood in Camden County highlighted in red (right). Inset map: Location of Camden County in New Jersey highlighted in orange (left).

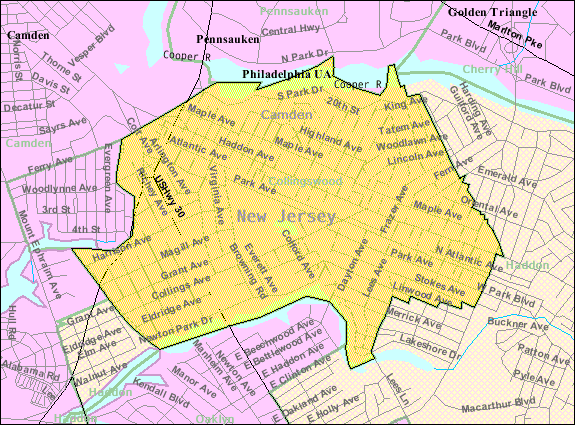
- Census Bureau map of Collingswood, New Jersey

- Location in Camden County Location in New Jersey Location in the United States
- Coordinates: 39.915275°N 75.078391°W
- Country: United States
- State: New Jersey
- County: Camden
- European settlement: 1682
- Incorporated: May 22, 1888
- Named for: Collings family

Government
  - Type: Walsh Act
  - Body: Board of Commissioners
  - Mayor: Daniela Solano-Ward (term ends May 1, 2029)
  - Administrator: Cassandra Duffey
  - Municipal clerk: K. Holly Mannel

Area
  - Total: 1.93 sq mi (5.01 km^{2})
  - Land: 1.83 sq mi (4.74 km^{2})
  - Water: 0.10 sq mi (0.27 km^{2}) 5.90%
  - Rank: 418th of 565 in state 19th of 37 in county
- Elevation: 20 ft (6.1 m)

Population (2020)
  - Total: 14,186
  - Estimate (2023): 14,204
  - Rank: 186th of 565 in state 9th of 37 in county
  - Density: 7,751.9/sq mi (2,993.0/km^{2})
  - Rank: 56th of 565 in state 3rd of 37 in county
- Time zone: UTC−05:00 (Eastern (EST))
  - Summer (DST): UTC−04:00 (Eastern (EDT))
- ZIP Code: 08107–08108
- Area code: 856
- FIPS code: 3400714260
- GNIS feature ID: 885191
- Website: www.collingswood.com

Collingswood is a borough in Camden County, in the U.S. state of New Jersey, located 5 miles (8.0 km) east of Center City Philadelphia. As of the 2020 United States census, the borough's population was 14,186, an increase of 260 (+1.9%) from the 2010 census count of 13,926, which in turn reflected a decline of 400 (−2.8%) from the 14,326 counted in the 2000 census.

Owing in part to its Quaker history, Collingswood was founded as a dry town where alcohol cannot be sold, however restaurant patrons are permitted to bring their own wine and beer to consume. In July 2015, the town introduced an ordinance that allows craft breweries to operate in the town but not serve food. The ordinance passed in August 2015. A voter referendum passed in November 2026 overturned the 138-year prohibition on alcohol sales, with the number of liquor stores to be specified later.

== History ==
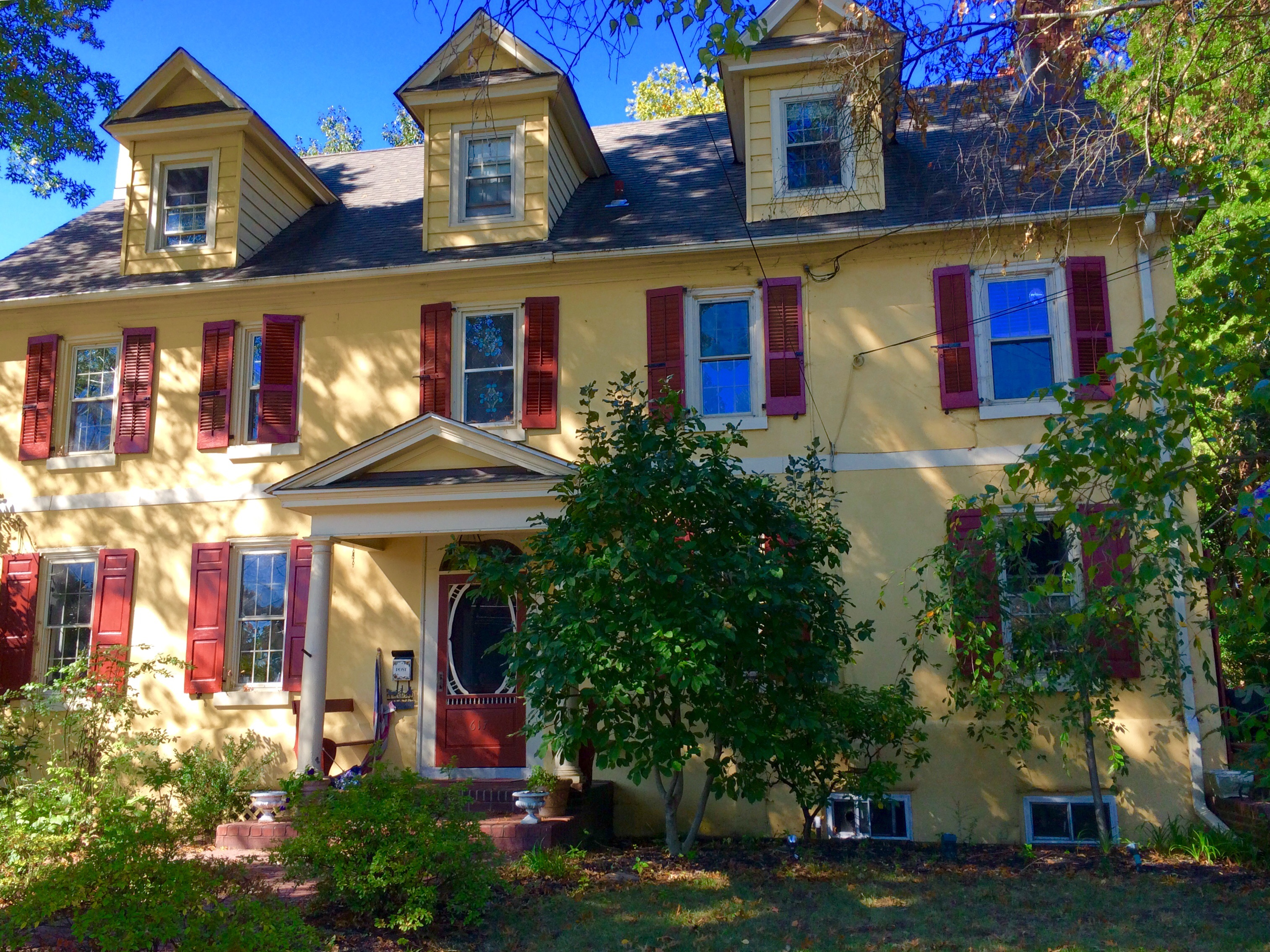
Stokes-Lees House, on the 600 block of Lees Avenue

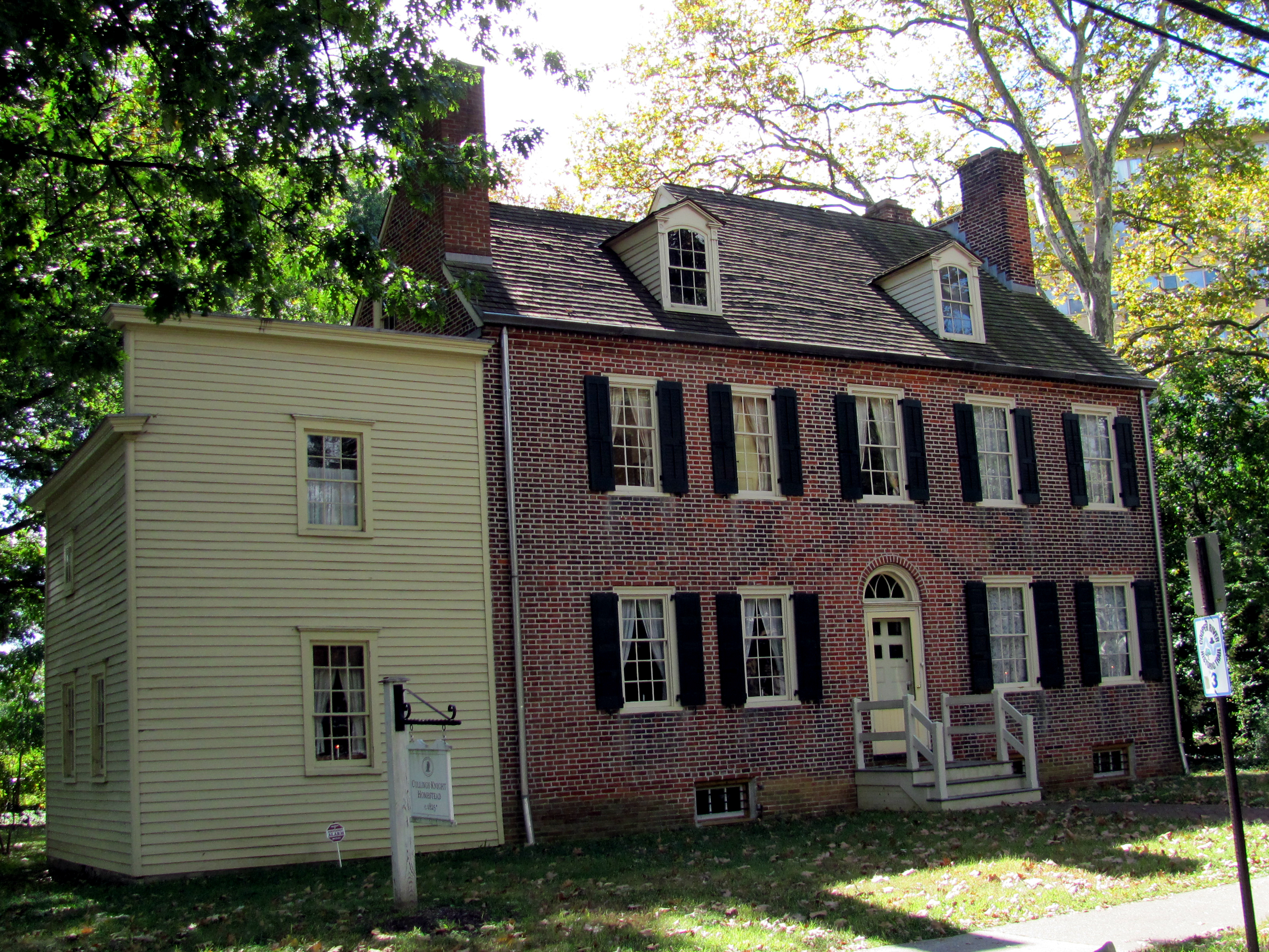
Collings-Knight Homestead

The land in what is present day Collingswood was originally inhabited by Lenape Native Americans. Quakers from England and Ireland settled along Newton Creek and Cooper River in the late 17th century, establishing what was known as the Newton Colony and eventually Newton Township. Much of what is now Collingswood was a farm owned by members of the Collings family during the 18th and 19th centuries. Later a section of Haddon Township, Collingswood was incorporated as a borough by an act of the New Jersey Legislature on May 22, 1888, based on the results of a referendum held that same day. That same year, town resident Edward Collings Knight, a wealthy sugar, real estate and railroad magnate, donated the land that became Knight Park. Knight was a descendant of the Collings family for whom the borough is named.

Collingswood has several historic homes including the 1820s-era house of the Collings family, known as the Collings-Knight homestead, which stands at the corner of Browning Road and Collings Avenue, shadowed by the Parkview at Collingswood apartment homes. The Stokes-Lees mansion located in the 600 block of Lees Avenue dates back to 1707, making it one of the oldest houses in Camden County. Sections of Harleigh Cemetery, the location of poet Walt Whitman's tomb, are in Collingswood.

== Geography ==
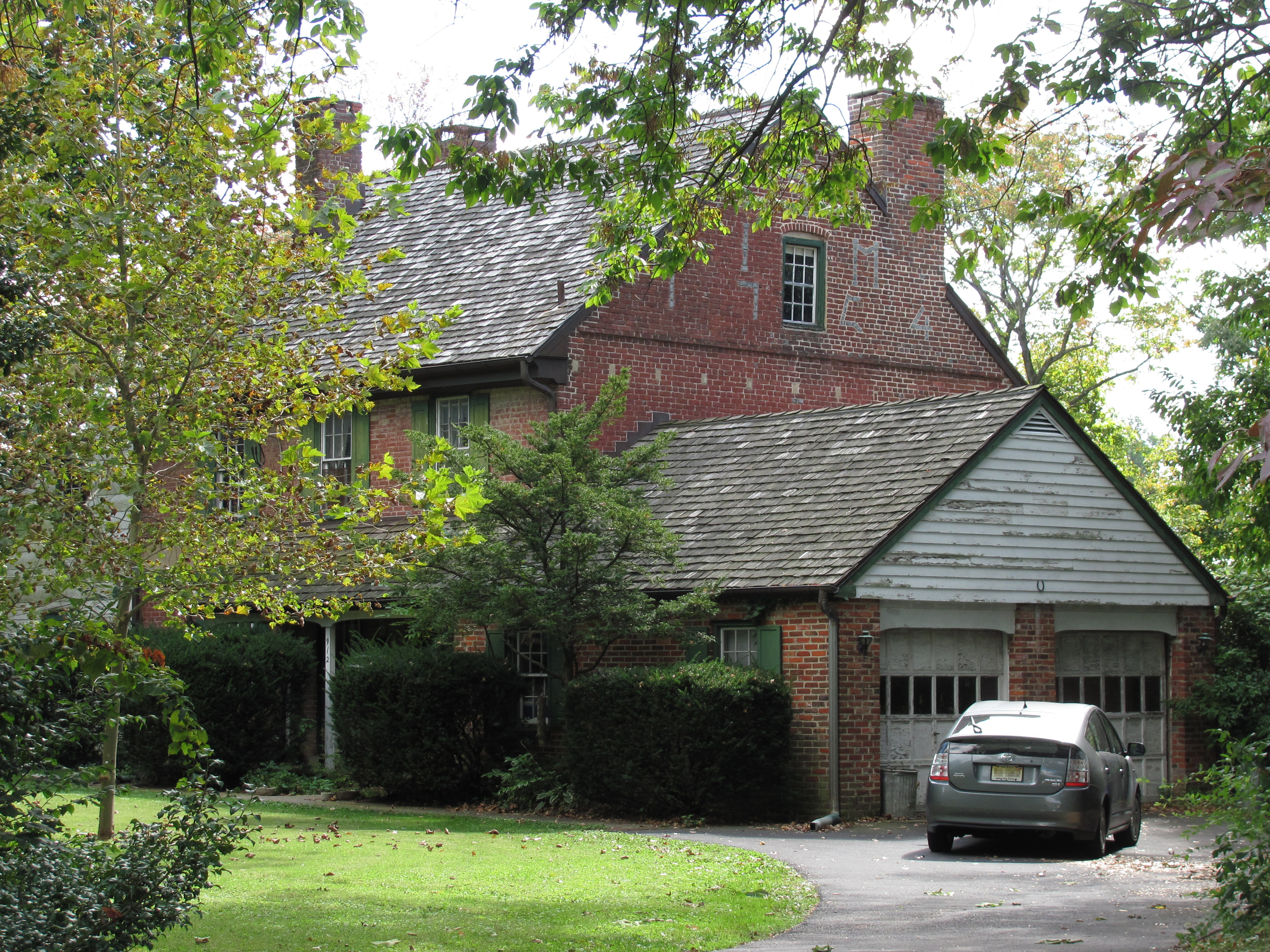
The Thackara House on Eldridge Avenue, built in 1754, is one of the oldest houses in Collingswood.

Collingswood is located in the Philadelphia metropolitan area, 5 miles (8.0 km) east of Philadelphia and 35 miles (56 km) southwest of Trenton, the state capital of New Jersey.

According to the U.S. Census Bureau, the borough had a total area of 1.95 square miles (5.04 km^{2}), including 1.83 square miles (4.74 km^{2}) of land and 0.12 square miles (0.30 km^{2}) of water (5.90%).

Unincorporated communities, localities and place names located partially or completely within the borough include Knight Park.

Collingswood shares land borders with Camden, Cherry Hill, Haddon Township, Oaklyn, Pennsauken Township and Woodlynne.

The Cooper River serves as the northern border of Collingswood and Newton Creek as the southern border.

== Demographics ==
Historical population
| Census | Pop. | Note | %± |
|---|---|---|---|
| 1890 | 539 | | — |
| 1900 | 1,633 | | 203.0% |
| 1910 | 4,795 | | 193.6% |
| 1920 | 8,714 | | 81.7% |
| 1930 | 12,723 | | 46.0% |
| 1940 | 12,685 | | −0.3% |
| 1950 | 15,800 | | 24.6% |
| 1960 | 17,370 | | 9.9% |
| 1970 | 17,422 | | 0.3% |
| 1980 | 15,838 | | −9.1% |
| 1990 | 15,289 | | −3.5% |
| 2000 | 14,326 | | −6.3% |
| 2010 | 13,926 | | −2.8% |
| 2020 | 14,186 | | 1.9% |
| 2023 (est.) | 14,204 | ▲ | 0.1% |
Population sources: 1890–2000 1890–1920 1890; 1890–1910 1910–1930; 1940–2000 2000; 2010 2020

=== 2020 census ===
As of the 2020 census, Collingswood had a population of 14,186. The median age was 38.5 years. 19.1% of residents were under the age of 18 and 15.8% of residents were 65 years of age or older. For every 100 females there were 95.0 males, and for every 100 females age 18 and over there were 92.0 males age 18 and over.

As defined by the Census Bureau, all residents lived in urban areas.

There were 6,455 households in Collingswood, of which 24.4% had children under the age of 18 living in them. Of all households, 38.7% were married-couple households, 21.8% were households with a male householder and no spouse or partner present, and 30.9% were households with a female householder and no spouse or partner present. About 36.2% of all households were made up of individuals and 12.9% had someone living alone who was 65 years of age or older.

There were 6,950 housing units, of which 7.1% were vacant. The homeowner vacancy rate was 1.4% and the rental vacancy rate was 8.4%.

Racial composition as of the 2020 census
| Race | Number | Percent |
|---|---|---|
| White | 10,535 | 74.3% |
| Black or African American | 1,358 | 9.6% |
| American Indian and Alaska Native | 80 | 0.6% |
| Asian | 348 | 2.5% |
| Native Hawaiian and Other Pacific Islander | 4 | 0.0% |
| Some other race | 694 | 4.9% |
| Two or more races | 1,167 | 8.2% |
| Hispanic or Latino (of any race) | 1,638 | 11.5% |

=== Income, education, and housing ===
The median household income was $90,184, with 9% of residents at or below the poverty line.

94.9% of residents 25 years or older held a high school diploma or higher, and 55% held a bachelor's degree or higher.

The median home valuation in 2025 was $458,000.

=== 2010 census ===
The 2010 United States census counted 13,926 people, 6,299 households, and 3,345 families in the borough. The population density was 7,639.4 per square mile (2,949.6/km^{2}). There were 6,822 housing units at an average density of 3,742.3 per square mile (1,444.9/km^{2}). The racial makeup was 81.78% (11,388) White, 9.11% (1,268) Black or African American, 0.32% (45) Native American, 2.20% (307) Asian, 0.01% (2) Pacific Islander, 4.01% (559) from other races, and 2.56% (357) from two or more races. Hispanic or Latino of any race were 9.67% (1,347) of the population.

Of the 6,299 households, 22.6% had children under the age of 18; 36.8% were married couples living together; 12.2% had a female householder with no husband present and 46.9% were non-families. Of all households, 37.0% were made up of individuals and 12.2% had someone living alone who was 65 years of age or older. The average household size was 2.20 and the average family size was 2.96.

About one-fifth of the population (19.4%) were under the age of 18, 8.0% from 18 to 24, 30.9% from 25 to 44, 28.2% from 45 to 64, and 13.5% who were 65 years of age or older. The median age was 39.0 years. For every 100 females, the population had 91.1 males. For every 100 females ages 18 and older there were 87.2 males.

The Census Bureau's 2006–2010 American Community Survey showed that (in 2010 inflation-adjusted dollars) median household income was $58,769 (with a margin of error of +/− $4,635) and the median family income was $74,236 (+/− $8,567). Males had a median income of $54,088 (+/− $5,121) versus $48,816 (+/− $4,244) for females. The per capita income for the borough was $34,126 (+/− $2,577). About 10.7% of families and 12.2% of the population were below the poverty line, including 19.5% of those under age 18 and 7.9% of those age 65 or over.

=== 2000 census ===
As of the 2000 United States census there were 14,326 people, 6,263 households, and 3,463 families residing in the borough. The population density was 7,835.2 inhabitants per square mile (3,025.2/km^{2}). There were 6,866 housing units at an average density of 3,755.2 per square mile (1,449.9/km^{2}). The racial makeup of the borough was 86.47% White, 6.67% African American, 0.34% Native American, 2.76% Asian, 0.02% Pacific Islander, 2.42% from other races, and 1.33% from two or more races. Hispanic or Latino of any race were 5.67% of the population.

There were 6,263 households, out of which 25.6% had children under the age of 18 living with them, 38.2% were married couples living together, 13.1% had a female householder with no husband present, and 44.7% were non-families. 36.6% of all households were made up of individuals, and 14.0% had someone living alone who was 65 years of age or older. The average household size was 2.27 and the average family size was 3.05.

In the borough the population was spread out, with 21.8% under the age of 18, 8.6% from 18 to 24, 32.9% from 25 to 44, 22.3% from 45 to 64, and 14.4% who were 65 years of age or older. The median age was 37 years. For every 100 females, there were 88.6 males. For every 100 females age 18 and over, there were 85.8 males.

The median income for a household in the borough was $43,175, and the median income for a family was $57,987. Males had a median income of $40,423 versus $30,877 for females. The per capita income for the borough was $24,358. About 3.8% of families and 6.1% of the population were below the poverty line, including 6.8% of those under age 18 and 7.2% of those age 65 or over.

== Arts and culture ==
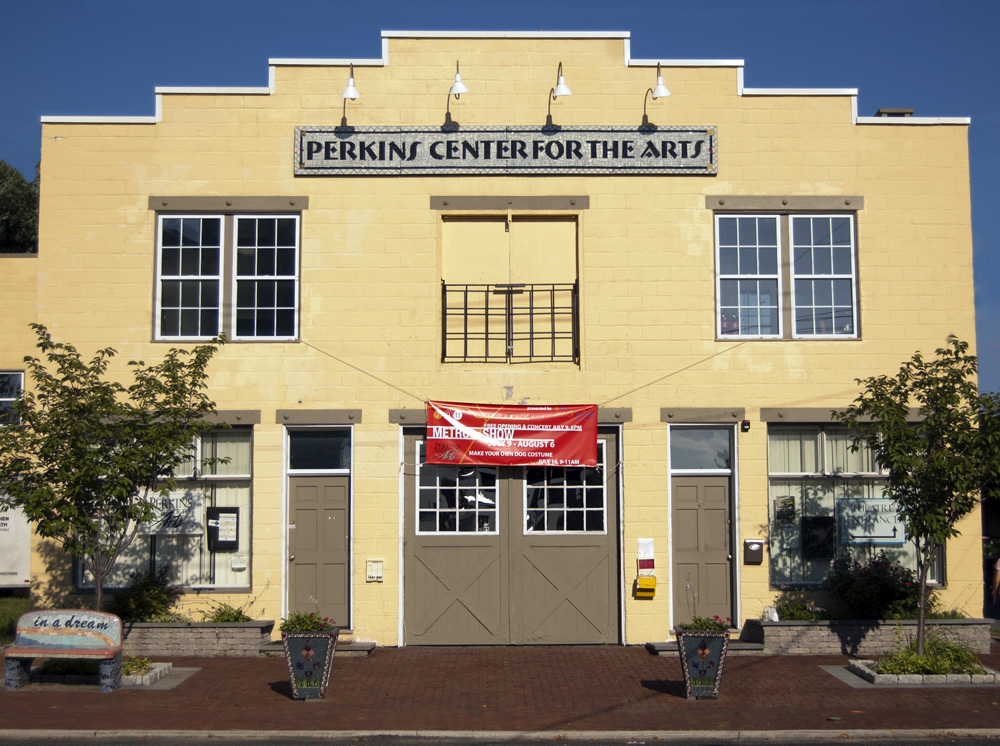
The Perkins Center for the Arts

Collingswood's retail district is anchored by Haddon Avenue, a section of County Route 561 which runs from Camden to Haddonfield. Collingswood's downtown is known primarily for its restaurants, which span a variety of cuisines.

On Saturdays from May to November, the borough hosts a farmers' market under the PATCO line, featuring local produce, baked goods, and crafts.

Collingswood Porchfest is an annual music event held in September, featuring more than 100 bands playing music around the borough.

Collingswood sponsors a bike share program, a community greenhouse, as well as a composting program. Beginning in 2009, Collingswood hosts a Green Festival to raise awareness of environmental responsibility.

Monthly "2nd Saturdays" have the borough's art galleries, stores and restaurants hosting new exhibitions by local, national, and international painters, sculptors, and photographers. In 2002, the Moorestown based Perkins Center for the Arts opened a second location in Collingswood.

The borough is home to two theater companies, the Collingswood Community Theatre and the Collingswood Shakespeare Company, which perform throughout the year.

The Scottish Rite Auditorium was built in 1930. The auditorium and its ballroom hosts local theatrical productions and has hosted national recording artists Ben Folds and The Beach Boys.

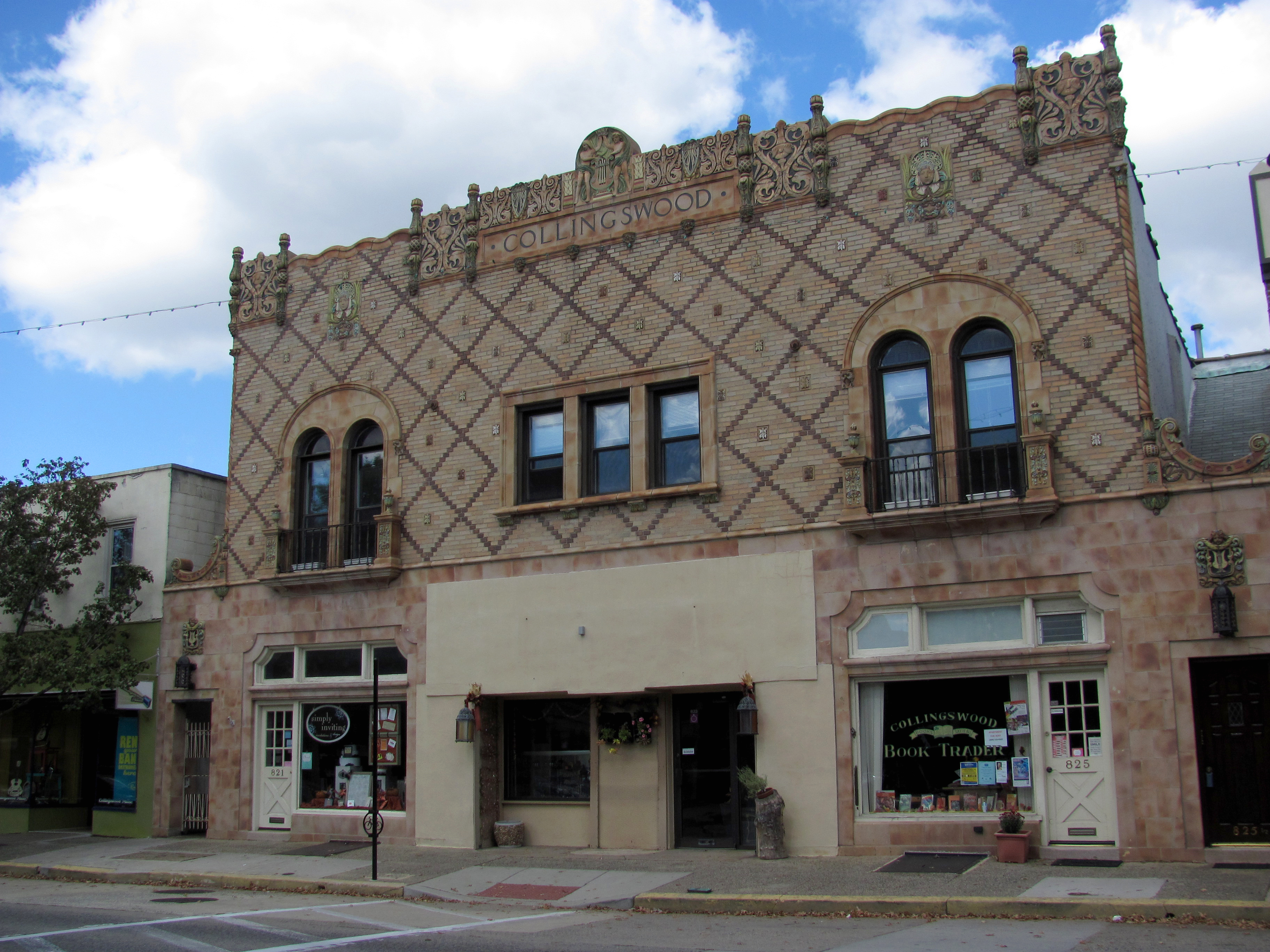
Collingswood Theater, which now houses retail shops and The Factory, a creative work space

The Rutgers University-Camden based Symphony in C orchestra's administrative and box offices are located on Haddon Avenue.

The annual Collingswood Book Festival hosts various authors including Camille Paglia and Matthew Quick, whose novel The Silver Linings Playbook is set in the borough (with scenes set in Oaklyn, Voorhees Township and the city of Philadelphia), though David O. Russell's film adaptation was set in Delaware County, Pennsylvania and Philadelphia.

Art Within Reach is a program that offers handmade items produced by local artists, with all profits going to the artists. With the 2014 season, the shows are held twice each year at The Factory.

Collingswood has a large LGBTQ community and former Mayor Jim Maley was one of a handful of New Jersey mayors to perform midnight civil union ceremonies the day New Jersey's Civil Union law took effect in 2006; in 2013, former Mayor Maley performed a number of same sex marriages at the Scottish Rite ballroom after same-sex marriage was recognized in New Jersey. In 2004, The Philadelphia Inquirer wrote about the borough's "fast growing gay and lesbian community," and the statewide LGBT advocacy and education organization Garden State Equality maintained a Southern New Jersey office in Collingswood until 2010.

== Parks and recreation ==
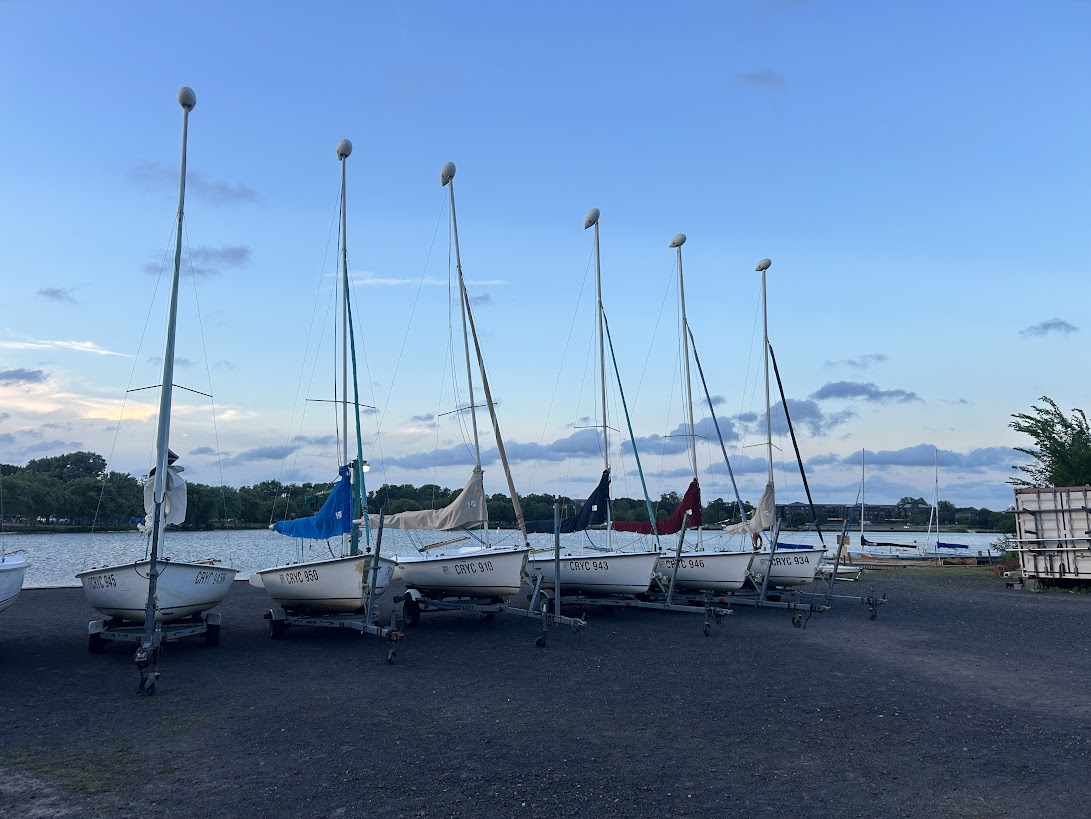
Sailboats at the Cooper River Yacht Club

Knight Park is the home to daytime recreation in the borough. It is located across the street from Collingswood High School and it hosts the home games of the high school's sports teams, including women's field hockey, lacrosse, baseball and softball. During the summer months, the borough offers outdoor movies and classical concerts in the park. Since 1979, the borough has held an annual May Fair festival, which takes place during Memorial Day weekend each year.

Roberts Pool is accessible to all residents in the summer months.

Collingswood is home to the Cooper River Yacht Club, which offers sailing lessons, events and sailing competitions throughout the year.

== Government ==
=== Local government ===
Collingswood operates under the Walsh Act form of New Jersey municipal government. The borough is one of 30 municipalities (of the 564) statewide that use the commission form of government. The governing body is comprised of three commissioners who are elected at-large on a non-partisan basis in elections held as part of the May municipal election to serve concurrent four-year terms of office. Each commissioner is assigned a specific department to head in addition to their legislative functions. The commissioners select one of their members to serve as mayor. The Borough of Collingswood has operated under the Walsh Act since 1917.

As of 2026, members of Collingswood's Board of Commissioners are Mayor Daniela Solano-Ward (Commissioner of Revenue and Finance), Deputy Mayor Dr. Amy Henderson Riley (Commissioner of Public Affairs and Public Safety) and M. James "Jim" Maley Jr. (Commissioner of Public Works, Parks and Public Property), all of whom are serving terms of office ending May 1, 2029.

Collingswood's previous Board of Commissioners included Robert Lewandowski (Commissioner of Revenue and Finance), and Morgan Robinson (Commissioner of Public Works, Parks and Public Property), all of whom served until May 15, 2025. In December 2020, Commissioner Joan Leonard announced that she would retire "in early 2021" after 24 years of service to the borough.

In September 2011, the borough experienced a "super downgrade" of its credit rating by Moody's, from A1 to Ba1, as a result of an outstanding multi-million dollar loan guarantee to a property developer. Moody's Investors Service issued a report in late May 2012 that restored the Borough of Collingswood's credit rating to an investment grade rating of Baa3.

=== Federal, state and county representation ===
Collingswood is located in the 1st Congressional District and is part of New Jersey's 5th state legislative district.

For the 119th United States Congress, New Jersey's 1st congressional district is represented by Donald Norcross (D, Camden). New Jersey is represented in the United States Senate by Democrats Cory Booker (Newark, term ends 2027) and Andy Kim (Moorestown, term ends 2031).

For the 2026–2027 session, the 5th legislative district of the New Jersey Legislature is represented in the State Senate by Nilsa Cruz-Perez (D, Barrington) and in the General Assembly by Bill Moen (D, Camden) and William Spearman (D, Camden).

Camden County is governed by a Board of County Commissioners composed of seven members chosen at-large in partisan elections for three-year terms on a staggered basis by the residents of the county, with either two or three seats up for election each year as part of the November general election. At a reorganization meeting held in January after each election, the newly constituted Board of Commissioners selects one member to serve as Director and another as Deputy Director, each serving a one-year term in that role. As of 2025, Camden County's Commissioners are: Commissioner Director Louis Cappelli Jr. (D, Collingswood, 2026), Commissioner Deputy Director Edward T. McDonnell (D, Pennsauken Township, 2025), Virginia Ruiz Betteridge (D, Runnemede, 2025), Almar Dyer (D, Pennsauken Township, 2027), Melinda Kane (D, Cherry Hill, 2027), Jeffrey L. Nash (D, Winslow Township, 2027), and Jonathan L. Young Sr. (D, Berlin Township, 2026).

Camden County's constitutional officers are: Clerk Pamela Rosen Lampitt (D, Cherry Hill, 2029) Sheriff Chuck Billingham (D, Gloucester City, 2027) and Surrogate Michelle Gentek-Mayer (D, Gloucester Township, 2025).

=== Politics ===
As of March 2011, there were a total of 9,825 registered voters in Collingswood, of which 4,269 (43.5%) were registered as Democrats, 1,345 (13.7%) were registered as Republicans and 4,193 (42.7%) were registered as Unaffiliated. There were 18 voters registered as Libertarians or Greens.

Gubernatorial election results for Collingswood
| Year | Republican | | Democratic | | Third party(ies) | |
| Year | No. | % | No. | % | No. | % |
|---|---|---|---|---|---|---|
| 2025 | 1,188 | 17.77% | 5,455 | 81.58% | 44 | 0.66% |
| 2021 | 1,192 | 23.01% | 3,923 | 75.72% | 66 | 1.27% |
| 2017 | 906 | 20.41% | 3,377 | 76.09% | 155 | 3.49% |
| 2013 | 1,819 | 48.69% | 1,822 | 48.77% | 95 | 2.54% |
| 2009 | 1,483 | 33.84% | 2,482 | 56.64% | 417 | 9.52% |
| 2005 | 1,402 | 33.23% | 2,536 | 60.11% | 281 | 6.66% |

In the 2024 presidential election, Democrat Kamala Harris received 78.11 % of the vote (6,169 votes) in Collingswood, Donald Trump received 19.75% (1,550 votes), with third-party candidates received 2.14% (169 votes). In the 2016 presidential election Democrat Hillary Clinton received 74.9% of the vote (5,255 votes), ahead of Republican Donald Trump, who received 24.9% of the vote (1,752 votes), with other candidates receiving 6.5% of the vote (457 votes). 7,519 total votes were cast among the district's 10,535 registered voters in the 2016 election, yielding a 71.4% turnout. In the 2012 presidential election, Democrat Barack Obama received 70.8% of the vote (4,927 cast), ahead of Republican Mitt Romney with 27.2% (1,892 votes), and other candidates with 2.0% (139 votes), among the 7,006 ballots cast by the borough's 10,585 registered voters (48 ballots were spoiled), for a turnout of 66.2%. In the 2008 presidential election, Democrat Barack Obama received 69.4% of the vote (5,192 cast), ahead of Republican John McCain, who received around 27.3% (2,038 votes), with 7,478 ballots cast among the borough's 10,305 registered voters, for a turnout of 72.6%. In the 2004 presidential election, Democrat John Kerry received 63.6% of the vote (4,629 ballots cast), outpolling Republican George W. Bush, who received around 33.9% (2,467 votes), with 7,277 ballots cast among the borough's 9,527 registered voters, for a turnout percentage of 76.4.

United States presidential election results for Collingswood
| Year | Republican | | Democratic | | Third party(ies) | |
| Year | No. | % | No. | % | No. | % |
|---|---|---|---|---|---|---|
| 2024 | 1,560 | 19.75% | 6,169 | 78.11% | 169 | 2.14% |
| 2020 | 1,721 | 20.44% | 6,550 | 77.79% | 149 | 1.77% |
| 2016 | 1,752 | 23.47% | 5,255 | 70.40% | 457 | 6.12% |
| 2012 | 1,892 | 27.19% | 4,927 | 70.81% | 139 | 2.00% |
| 2008 | 2,038 | 27.25% | 5,192 | 69.43% | 248 | 3.32% |
| 2004 | 2,467 | 33.90% | 4,629 | 63.61% | 181 | 2.49% |

In the 2013 gubernatorial election, Democrat Barbara Buono received 48.8% of the vote (1,822 cast), ahead of Republican Chris Christie with 48.7% (1,819 votes), and other candidates with 2.5% (95 votes), among the 3,809 ballots cast by the borough's 10,702 registered voters (73 ballots were spoiled), for a turnout of 35.6%. In the 2009 gubernatorial election, Democrat Jon Corzine received 56.6% of the vote (2,482 ballots cast), ahead of both Republican Chris Christie with 33.8% (1,483 votes) and Independent Chris Daggett with 6.5% (285 votes), with 4,382 ballots cast among the borough's 9,831 registered voters, yielding a 44.6% turnout.

United States Senate election results for Collingswood1
| Year | Republican | | Democratic | | Third party(ies) | |
| Year | No. | % | No. | % | No. | % |
|---|---|---|---|---|---|---|
| 2024 | 1,472 | 19.01% | 6,126 | 79.11% | 146 | 1.89% |
| 2018 | 1,561 | 23.85% | 4,571 | 69.85% | 412 | 6.30% |
| 2012 | 1,758 | 26.29% | 4,748 | 70.99% | 182 | 2.72% |
| 2006 | 1,565 | 33.87% | 2,949 | 63.82% | 107 | 2.32% |

United States Senate election results for Collingswood2
| Year | Republican | | Democratic | | Third party(ies) | |
| Year | No. | % | No. | % | No. | % |
|---|---|---|---|---|---|---|
| 2020 | 1,806 | 21.53% | 6,451 | 76.90% | 132 | 1.57% |
| 2014 | 1,055 | 27.32% | 2,719 | 70.42% | 87 | 2.25% |
| 2013 | 709 | 27.92% | 1,807 | 71.17% | 23 | 0.91% |
| 2008 | 2,075 | 30.16% | 4,633 | 67.33% | 173 | 2.51% |

== Education ==
The Collingswood Public Schools serve students in pre-kindergarten through twelfth grade. As of the 2024–25 school year, the district, comprised of nine schools, had an enrollment of 2,207 students and 182.5 classroom teachers (on an FTE basis), for a student–teacher ratio of 12.1:1. Schools in the district (with 2024–25 enrollment data from the National Center for Education Statistics) are Collingswood Preschool with NA students at Parkview and 43 at Oaklyn in PreK, James A. Garfield Elementary School with 128 students in grades K-5 (closed June 2026), Mark Newbie Elementary School with 136 students in grades K-5, Thomas Sharp Elementary School with 211 students in grades PreK-5, William P. Tatem Elementary School with 248 students in grades K-5, Zane North Elementary School with 174 students in grades K-5, Collingswood Middle School with 446 students in grades 6-8 and Collingswood High School with 761 students in grades 9-12.

Students in ninth through twelfth grades from Woodlynne attend Collingswood High School as part of a sending/receiving relationship with the Woodlynne School District. Students in grades six through 12 from Oaklyn attend the middle and high school as part of a sending/receiving relationship with the Oaklyn Public School District.

Good Shepherd Regional Catholic School was an elementary school that operates under the auspices of the Roman Catholic Diocese of Camden. In April 2020, the Diocese of Camden announced that Good Shepherd was one of five Catholic schools in New Jersey which would close permanently at the end of the school year in June.

== Transportation ==
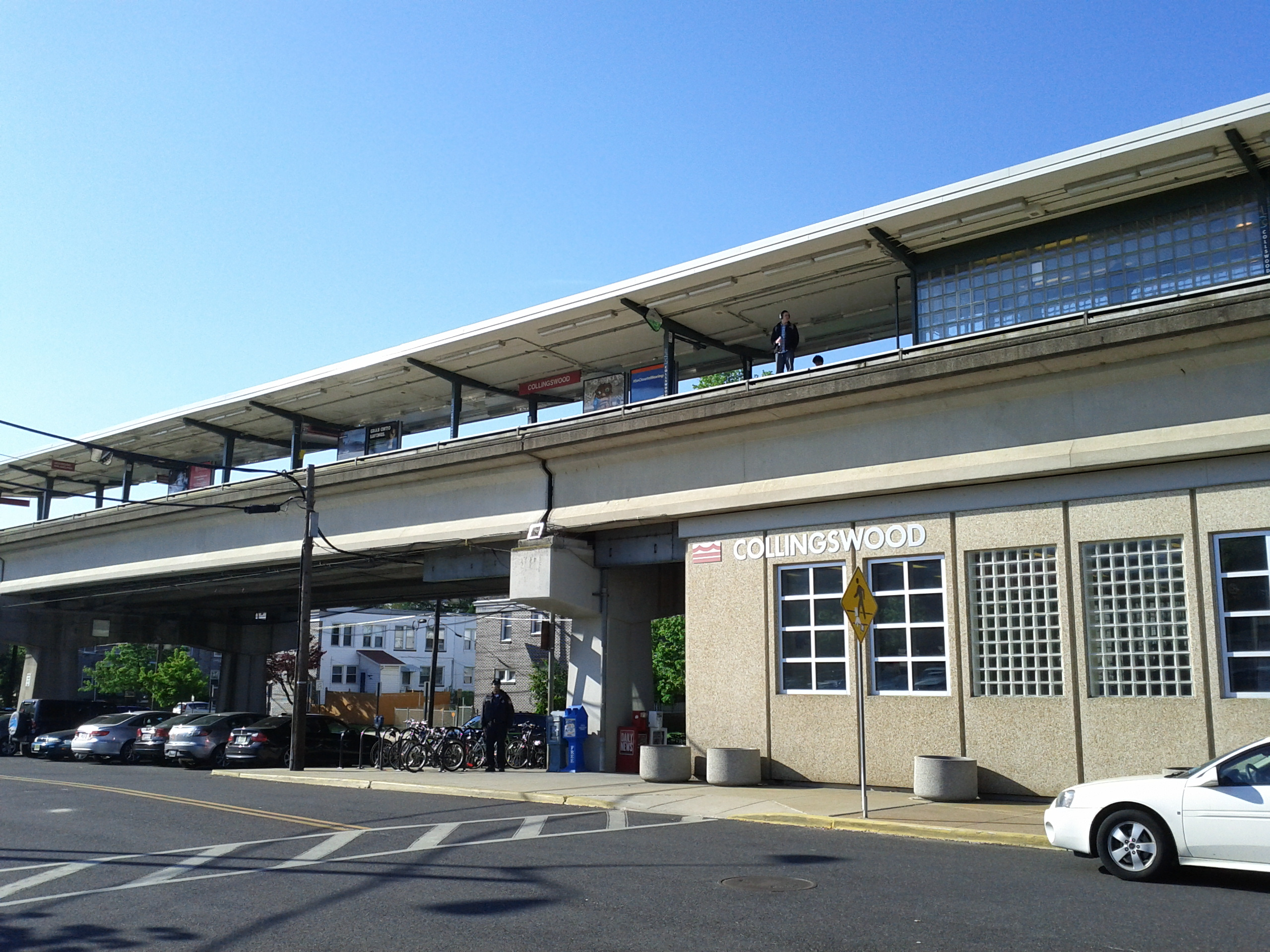
Collingswood station in Collingswood is the PATCO Speedline station to Philadelphia and Lindenwold.

=== Public transportation ===
The Collingswood PATCO Speedline Park and Ride station links the town to the eastern suburbs, Camden and Philadelphia by elevated rail. The station is grouped in ride price with Westmont and Haddonfield.

Collingswood is also served by NJ Transit local routes 403, 450, and 451 to Camden.

=== Roads and highways ===
As of May 2010, the borough had a total of 41.33 miles (66.51 km) of roadways, of which 31.06 miles (49.99 km) were maintained by the municipality, 8.29 miles (13.34 km) by Camden County and 1.98 miles (3.19 km) by the New Jersey Department of Transportation.

U.S. Route 30 and U.S. Route 130 are the main highways serving Collingswood. County Route 561 also passes through the borough locally called Haddon Avenue.

== Media ==
The Retrospect, a weekly newspaper founded in 1921 that covers local news in Collingswood and the surrounding suburban communities (with a companion news website), is headquartered on Haddon Avenue. In addition, NJ Pen, a hyperlocal news site covers Collingswood and the surrounding suburbs, and Patch Media has a Collingswood website. Collingswood is in the Philadelphia media market.

== Notable people ==
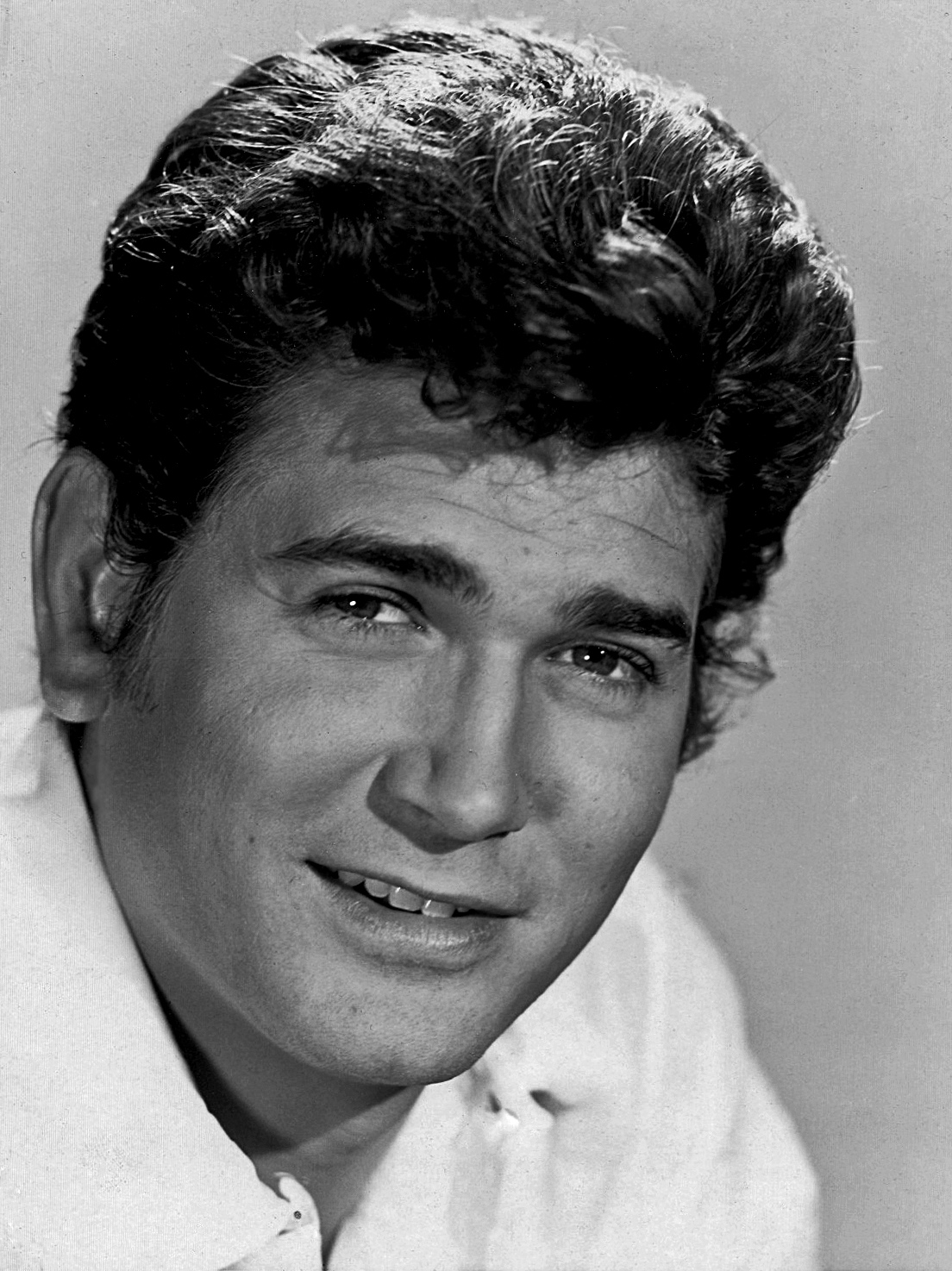
Actor Michael Landon graduated from Collingswood High School

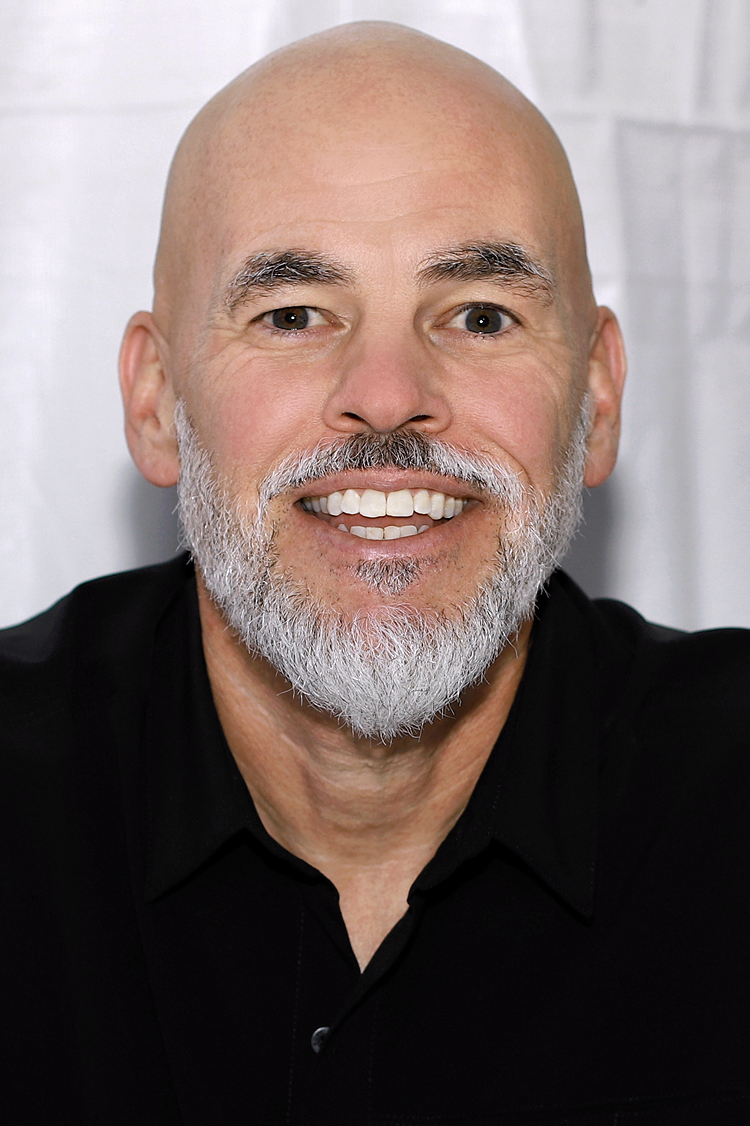
Novelist Matthew Quick

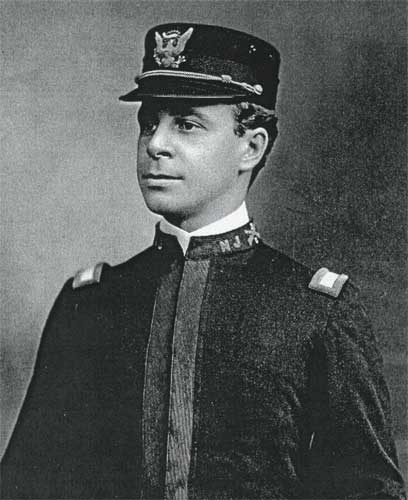
Judge Ralph Waldo Emerson Donges in 1899

People who were born in, residents of, or otherwise closely associated with Collingswood include:

- John Aglialoro (born 1943), business executive, film producer and libertarian activist
- Richard V. Allen (1936–2024), National Security Advisor during the Presidency of Ronald Reagan and senior fellow at the Hoover Institution
- Arthur E. Armitage (1891–1981), founder of the College of South Jersey and South Jersey Law School (now Rutgers University-Camden)
- B. J. Averell (born 1979), actor and winner of The Amazing Race 9
- Robbie Bennett (born 1979), keyboard player for The War on Drugs
- Ted Brown (1924–2005), New York City radio personality
- Victoria Budinger (born 1952), best known as "Miss Vicki", wife of Tiny Tim
- William T. Cahill (1912–1996), Governor of New Jersey from 1970–1974
- Don Casey (born 1937), former head coach of the Los Angeles Clippers and the New Jersey Nets who started his coaching career at Bishop Eustace
- Michael Corbett (born 1956), author and actor
- Jacqueline Crahalla (born 1940), former member of the Pennsylvania House of Representatives
- Marguerite de Angeli (1889–1987), children's author
- William K. Dickey (1920–2008), former Speaker of the New Jersey General Assembly
- Ralph W. E. Donges (1875–1974), Associate Justice of the New Jersey Supreme Court from 1930 to 1948
- Cathy Engelbert (born 1965), Commissioner of the WNBA and former CEO of Deloitte, who was the first female CEO of a major U.S. accounting firm
- Bartholomew J. Eustace (1887–1956), Bishop of Camden from 1938 to 1956
- Stink Fisher (born 1970), actor and restaurateur
- Glenn Foley (born 1970), former football quarterback who played in the NFL for the New York Jets and Seattle Seahawks
- James Hoch (born 1967), poet, college professor
- David B. Joslin (born 1936), bishop of the Episcopal Diocese of Central New York from 1992 to 2000
- Michael Landon (1936–1991), television actor and director
- Bob Lassiter (1945–2006), talk radio personality
- Gerald Luongo (born 1938), politician who represented the 4th Legislative District in the New Jersey General Assembly from 1998 to 2000
- Jimmy Lyon (1921–1984), jazz pianist
- Alison Macrina (born 1984), librarian and activist, director of the Library Freedom Project
- Thomas M. Madden (1907–1976), judge who served on the United States District Court for the District of New Jersey
- Kelly McGillis (born 1957), film actress
- Carl McIntire (1906–2002), founder of and minister in the Bible Presbyterian Church
- Edwin Mills (1928-2021), economist, professor emeritus at Northwestern University
- Ann Morhauser (born 1957), glass artist
- Elmer Myers (1894–1976), professional baseball player
- Ray Narleski (1928–2012), relief pitcher in Major League Baseball who played with the Cleveland Indians (1954–1958) and Detroit Tigers (1959)
- Delia Parr (born 1947), author of historical fiction
- Eddie Picken (1907–1994), early professional basketball player; younger brother of Jim
- Jim Picken (1903–1975), early professional basketball player; older brother of Eddie
- Matthew Quick (born 1976), author of the novel The Silver Linings Playbook
- Dennis L. Riley (1945–2023), politician who served in the New Jersey General Assembly, where he represented the 4th Legislative District from 1980 to 1990
- Bobby Ryan (born 1987), professional hockey player
- Kory Stamper (born 1975), lexicographer and editor for the Merriam-Webster family of dictionaries and the author of Word by Word: The Secret Life of Dictionaries
- Richard Sterban (born 1943), bass singer for The Oak Ridge Boys and former vocalist with Elvis Presley
- Joseph C. Strasser (1940-2019), rear admiral of the United States Navy who served a tour as President of the Naval War College
- Ben Vaughn (born 1956), musician, producer, radio host
- Gary Williams (born 1945), former head coach of the Maryland Terrapins men's basketball team
- Helen Van Pelt Wilson (1901–2003), gardener and author
