= Jimmy Lyon (pianist) =

American pianist (1921–1984)

- Born: 1921; Camden, New Jersey, U.S.
- Died: November 28, 1984 (aged 62–63); New York City, New York, U.S.
- Occupation: Pianist
- Known for: Jazz piano
- Children: 2

Jimmy Lyon (1921 – November 28, 1984) was an American jazz pianist. He was the musical accompanist for the vocalists June Christy and Mabel Mercer for many years.

== Early life ==
Lyon was born in 1921, in Camden, New Jersey. Lyon began playing piano seriously in 1938 when he was attending Collingswood High School in Collingswood, New Jersey. He came home to hear a mystery player on the radio who turned out to be Art Tatum; Lyon drove to Philadelphia that same day to buy whatever records of Tatum's he could find because he was so impressed. Tatum became Lyon's biggest influence, inspiring him to practice five to six hours per day and to form a band. After serving in the United States Air Force during World War II, Lyon pursued small jobs with jazz groups, becoming a professional piano player by 1948. It was in this time that Lyon met Tatum and became close friends with him.

== Career ==
Lyon spent most of his career as an accompanist; he played for June Christy for a year and a half before beginning work at the Blue Angel nightclub, where he remained for nine years. He met Mabel Mercer at the Angel, and they collaborated periodically for eight years; he made a record with her in 1958 and performed with her in 1968 for a Town Hall concert with Bobby Short. Two years later became her regular accompanist, playing for her for eight years; five of those were spent at the St. Regis Hotel. In 1978 he began an extended piano-playing engagement at Peacock Alley at the Waldorf-Astoria Hotel.

During his career, Lyon also accompanied Polly Bergen and Connie Haines.

A resident of Paramus, New Jersey, Lyon died of cancer at Lenox Hill Hospital in New York City, at the age of 63.
