= Oaklyn Public School District =

School district in Camden County, New Jersey, US

Address
- 136 Kendall Boulevard Oaklyn, Camden County, New Jersey, 08107; United States
- Coordinates: 39.903111°N 75.088645°W

District information
- Grades: PreK-5
- Superintendent: Fredrick McDowell
- Business administrator: Beth Ann Coleman
- Schools: 1

Students and staff
- Enrollment: 282 (as of 2022–23)
- Faculty: 32.0 FTEs
- Student–teacher ratio: 8.8:1

Other information
- District Factor Group: CD
- Website: oaklynschool.org
Ind.	Per pupil	District spending	Rank (*)	K-12 average	%± vs. average
1A	Total Spending	$14,994	3	$18,891	−20.6%
1	Budgetary Cost	11,495	5	14,783	−22.2%
2	Classroom Instruction	7,373	12	8,763	−15.9%
6	Support Services	1,730	9	2,392	−27.7%
8	Administrative Cost	1,225	1	1,485	−17.5%
10	Operations & Maintenance	1,069	2	1,783	−40.0%
13	Extracurricular Activities	95	1	268	−64.6%
16	Median Teacher Salary	53,310	7	64,043
Data from NJDoE 2014 Taxpayers' Guide to Education Spending. *Of K-12 districts with up to 1,800 students. Lowest spending=1; Highest=49

Oaklyn Public School District is a community public school district that serves students in pre-kindergarten through fifth grade from Oaklyn, in Camden County, in the U.S. state of New Jersey. Prior to the 2018–19 school year Oaklyn Public School served students through ninth grade. Oaklyn was the last district in New Jersey that used a Kindergarten through ninth grade format.

As of the 2022–23 school year, the district, comprised of one school, had an enrollment of 282 students and 32.0 classroom teachers (on an FTE basis), for a student–teacher ratio of 8.8:1.

The district is classified by the New Jersey Department of Education as being in District Factor Group "CD", the sixth-highest of eight groupings. District Factor Groups organize districts statewide to allow comparison by common socioeconomic characteristics of the local districts. From lowest socioeconomic status to highest, the categories are A, B, CD, DE, FG, GH, I and J.

Students in sixth through twelfth grades from Oaklyn attend Collingswood Middle School and Collingswood High School as part of a sending/receiving relationship. As of the 2020–21 school year, the high school had an enrollment of 747 students and 67.3 classroom teachers (on an FTE basis), for a student–teacher ratio of 11.1:1.

== History ==
In 1997, there was a proposal for the students to wear school uniforms, opposed by students, but plans were canceled.

Oaklyn Public School had also served students in K-8 from Hi-Nella, a non-operating school district. With Hi-Nella ending its sending/receiving relationship under a phase-out that would see all Hi-Nella students out of Oaklyn's school by 2016-17, the district saw overall enrollment decline from 469 in 2011-12 to 384 in 2014-15. The loss of Hi-Nella's students, and the tuition revenue that accounted for as much as 10% of Oaklyn's budget, have caused significant strain on the district's budget, which has seen a substantial decline in its fiscal balance.

In 2017, the Oaklyn Board of Education and the Collingswood Board of Education finalized an agreement to expand the send-receive relationship to send Oaklyn students to Collingswood school in sixth grade starting with the 2018-2019 school year. Previously the agreement only included students in grades ten through twelve.

== Schools ==
Schools in the district (with 2020–21 enrollment data from the National Center for Education Statistics) are:

- Oaklyn Public School, which educates students from pre-kindergarten through fifth grades (277 students)
  - Jennifer Boulden, principal

== Administration ==
Core members of the district's administration are:

- Fredrick McDowell, superintendent
- Beth Ann Coleman, business administrator and board secretary

== Board of education ==
The district's board of education, comprised of nine members, sets policy and oversees the fiscal and educational operation of the district through its administration. As a Type II school district, the board's trustees are elected directly by voters to serve three-year terms of office on a staggered basis, with three seats up for election each year held (since 2013) as part of the November general election. The board appoints a superintendent to oversee the district's day-to-day operations and a business administrator to supervise the business functions of the district.
