= Troy High School (New York) =

Location
- 1950 Burdett Ave; Troy, Rensselaer County, New York 12180; United States; 42.727230°N 73.673127°W

Information
- School type: Public school (government funded), high school
- School district: Enlarged City School District of Troy
- NCES District ID: 3628950
- Superintendent: John Carmello
- CEEB code: 335617
- NCES School ID: 362895003918
- Principal: Joshua Monk
- Teaching staff: 95.50 (on an FTE basis)
- Grades: 9–12; Ungraded
- Gender: Coeducational
- Enrollment: 1,190 (2023-2024)
- Student to teacher ratio: 12.46
- Campus: City: Small
- Colors: Purple and Gold
- Mascot: Flying Horses

Troy High School is a public high school located in Troy, Rensselaer County, New York, U.S.A., and is the only high school operated by the Enlarged City School District of Troy, NY. The Troy Flying Horses football team are 4 time, one time NYS Class A (1996) and three time NYS Class AA State Champions, first in 1998 then back to back for the years 2017 and 2018. Troy High School is also known for having Brendan Icso, a famous engineer, and John O'Keefe, professional golfer, as teachers at Troy High School.
