= The Silver Linings Playbook =

2008 novel by Matthew Quick

- First edition
- Author: Matthew Quick
- Language: English
- Genre: Humorous fiction
- Publisher: Farrar, Straus and Giroux
- Publication date: September 2, 2008
- Publication place: United States
- Media type: Print
- Pages: 304
- ISBN: 0-374-26426-0
- OCLC: 255680052
- Dewey Decimal: 813

The Silver Linings Playbook is a 2008 debut novel of American author Matthew Quick.

== Plot ==
The book is narrated through the eyes of Pat Peoples, and occasionally Tiffany's, through letters. A former history teacher who has moved back to his childhood home in Collingswood, New Jersey, after spending time in a Baltimore psychiatric hospital, Pat believes he has been away only a few months, but soon realizes it has been years, and struggles to piece together his lost memories and what has become of his wife, Nikki. He has a hypothesis that life is a film created by God and that its "silver lining" will be the end of "Apart Time" with Nikki. Pat embarks on a plan of self-improvement in order to win Nikki back, including regular running and working out in a home gym. At a dinner with his friend Ronnie and his wife Veronica, Pat is introduced to Tiffany Webster, who has also moved back home after losing her job after her husband's death.

Pat runs with Tiffany, who started out by following him every day, and she volunteers, in a letter, to be a go-between between him and Nikki, if he will train in a dance routine with her so that she can enter a competition. He agrees, and they enter and win. After the contest, Pat suggests a meeting with Nikki at the place they got engaged, and despite a letter saying they will never meet up, he slips away from his family on Christmas Day to meet her. Nikki is not there; Tiffany is, and admits she has forged Nikki's letters and that she had been trying to help Pat move on and gain closure with his marriage because she, Tiffany, is in love with Pat. Pat is furious that the last two months of correspondence were a lie. In shock Pat runs into an unfamiliar neighborhood and is assaulted. By chance, he encounters Danny, his friend from the Baltimore mental health facility. Danny helps Pat get to a hospital and reunite with his family. Pat still does not recall how or why he was separated from his wife, and only when he watches the wedding video, which his mother had hidden, do the memories eventually return — with the realization that he and Nikki will never be reunited.

After several weeks, Pat recovers from his injuries, and after receiving a letter, agrees to meet Tiffany. Pat explains that he asked his brother Jake to drive him to see Nikki, and observed her from afar, finally realizing she has a new family and is happy, and thus accepts it as the ending of the movie of his life. Tiffany gives Pat a cloud chart as a belated birthday present and they lie on the ground and watch the clouds together. Pat pulls Tiffany close and she tells him that she needs him. As they lie there on a frozen soccer field in the middle of a snowstorm, Pat kisses her and says, "I think I need you too."

== Film adaptation ==
A film adaptation, Silver Linings Playbook, directed by David O. Russell, was released on November 16, 2012. It stars Bradley Cooper as Pat (renamed Pat Solitano), Jennifer Lawrence as Tiffany (renamed Tiffany Maxwell), and Chris Tucker as Danny. The film debuted at the 2012 Toronto International Film Festival, where it was awarded the TIFF People's Choice Award. It was nominated for eight Academy Awards including the Big Five with Lawrence winning the award for Best Actress. The screenplay made several changes to the plot, including changing Pat's ethnicity to the Italian-American Pat Solitano, giving him a working class background whose family lives in the suburb of Upper Darby Township, Pennsylvania. A character named Randy, who was not in the novel, was added. Most of the supporting characters, such as Danny, play much more significant roles than they do in the novel, and several characters' names and personalities differ from the novel. In addition, some of the key plot points have been replaced; e.g., the film has a subplot about gambling that is not in the novel, the emphasis on tailgating at Eagles games is downplayed, and several of the climactic events were adjusted. Notably, while Pat's condition is never specified in the novel, one can infer from both his narrative about his memories, and other events as they unfold, that he suffered from traumatic brain injury. While Pat in the novel could have had bipolar disorder as well, this is never specified as it is in the film.
