= Fly Away (film) =

- Theatrical release poster
- Directed by: Janet Grillo
- Written by: Janet Grillo
- Produced by: Janet Grillo; Pavlina Hatoupis
- Starring: Beth Broderick; Ashley Rickards; Greg Germann; JR Bourne; Reno
- Cinematography: Sandra Valde-Hansen
- Edited by: Danny Daneau
- Music by: Luke Rothschild
- Production companies: Cricket Films; Ministry of Content
- Distributed by: New Video
- Release dates: March 13, 2011 (SXSW); April 15, 2011 (United States)
- Running time: 80 minutes
- Country: United States
- Language: English

Fly Away is a 2011 American drama film written and directed by Janet Grillo, and starring Beth Broderick, Ashley Rickards, Greg Germann, JR Bourne, and Reno.

Made as a SAG Ultra-Low Budget Independent Film, and shot in 14 days, Fly Away premiered as one of eight out of 2000 submissions in Narrative Competition at the South by Southwest Film Festival in Austin, Texas, on March 13, 2011. The film received a limited theatrical release in select cities on April 15, 2011, and was made available on video on demand (VOD), DVD, and Digital on April 26. 10% of proceeds from DVD sales and 15% of proceeds from VOD rentals were donated to Autism Speaks.

The film received mostly positive reviews from critics, who commended Rickards' performance. The film won Best Film and Special Jury Prize for Performance (Ashley Rickards) at the Arizona International Film Festival in April 2011, and Honorable Mention from the prestigious Voice Awards, sponsored by the national Substance Abuse and Mental Health Services Administration (SAHMSA). The film's screenplay won the award for the Best International Screenplay from the 2010 Swansea Bay Film Festival in Wales.

== Plot ==
Jeanne is awakened by crying from her autistic teenage daughter Mandy. Mandy is suffering an anxiety attack, as she has almost every night for months. Jeanne instructs her daughter to "use her strategies". Jeanne calms her by singing "Lady bug, lady bug, fly away home."

The next morning, Jeanne struggles to get Mandy to school. Jeanne receives a phone call from her freelance business partner, Sue. They are under pressure to complete a project for a major client. Jeanne is interrupted by the school reporting Mandy with another fit. Principal Liz Howell suggests Mandy should go to a different school.

Desperate for help, Jeanne calls Mandy's father, Peter, asking if he could take Mandy for the weekend. He makes his usual excuses, and Jeanne turns around and sees Mandy with her laptop deleting her work. The next day, Peter surprises them by showing up, and sweeping Mandy off to the park. Jeanne is enjoying a rare moment of peace when Peter calls, in great distress. Mandy's had another fit, attacking yet another child on the playground. Jeanne rushes to the rescue, and takes control of the situation.

The next day, Jeanne takes Mandy out for ice cream to console her after school. Mandy disturbs the ice cream parlor. A day later, Jeanne walks her dog and meets a charming neighbor, Tom. The school calls to report Mandy having another fit, and Jeanne rushes away from Tom. Mandy is suspended for a week. While attending to Mandy's round-the-clock needs, Jeanne's work is affected. Sue ends the partnership.

The next day, Jeanne and Mandy see Tom at the dog park. Tom is charmed by Mandy's eccentricity, and they go out for pizza. Later, Tom and Jeanne start to grow closer, but Jeanne pulls away from him.

Mandy is expelled from school, leaving Jeanne few options. Mandy cheers her mother by singing "fly away home". Jeanne and Peter discuss putting Mandy into a residential facility. Anguished at losing contact with Mandy, Jeanne sees an airplane flying freely and thinks of Mandy becoming independent.

== Cast ==
- Beth Broderick as Jeanne Cafferty
- Ashley Rickards as Mandy
- Greg Germann as Tom
- JR Bourne as Peter
- Reno as Liz Howell
- Elaine Hall as Ms. Quinlan
- Denise Y. Dowse as Susan
- Zachariah Palmer as Dylan

== Critical reception ==
The film received mostly positive reviews from critics. On the review aggregator website Rotten Tomatoes, 85% of 13 critics' reviews are positive, with an average rating of 6.8/10. Metacritic, which uses a weighted average, assigned the film a score of 66 out of 100, based on eight critics, indicating "generally favorable" reviews.

The Los Angeles Times wrote, "The lovely, heartbreaking Fly Away benefits from superb performances and a gripping story managed with simplicity and grace by writer-producer-director Janet Grillo." The New York Times wrote: "A defiantly unsentimental look at the complex codependency between a harried single mother and her severely autistic daughter."

Rex Reed of The New York Observer wrote about Rickards' performance: "In a class by herself, she deserves, at the very least, an Oscar nomination. Not since Patty Duke in The Miracle Worker has any actor portrayed a disabled child (especially one with autism) with the same depth of passion and realism."

The Huffington Post commended both Broderick and Rickards for their performances: "Broderick plays Jeanne with a lost look on her face. She is overwhelmed by her circumstances, but is determined to persevere...In stark counterpoint to Jeanne is Mandy, the autistic daughter who is not like most of us. Mandy is played by Ashley Rickards, a young lady who should win an Academy Award for best supporting actress. She is that convincing. Her performance is both frightening and wonderful. Director Grillo lets us take small steps into Mandy's world by juxtaposing scenes of bright color with scenes of dreary darkness...Broderick and Rickards hit all the notes perfectly. Their duet is really something to see."

Conversely, Diego Costa of Slant Magazine wrote that the film suffers "from a generic sterility we've come to associate with made-for-TV movies. The screaming fits get repetitive, the mother's commitment reiterated ad nauseam, the meek, nice neighbor who wants to help is turned down, and yet the sensitivity of its subject is treated from a distance", while Elizabeth Weitzman of the New York Daily News commented that "Rickards tries hard in a difficult role and Greg Germann offers nice support as an empathetic neighbor. But like her character, it's Broderick who keeps things from falling apart."

== Awards and nominations ==
Award	Category	Recipient	Result
Arizona International Film Festival	Best Feature		Won
Arizona International Film Festival	Special Jury Prize	Ashley Rickards	Won
Voice Awards	Honorable Mention		Won
Swansea Bay Film Festival	Best International Screenplay		Won
