= Taylor Richardson (actress) =

American actress and filmmaker (born 2001)

- Richardson in 2025
- Education: Columbia University
- Occupations: Actress, filmmaker
- Years active: 2012–present

Taylor Richardson (born August 26, 2001) is an American actress and filmmaker. She is best known for her role as Annie in the 2012 Broadway revival of the musical Annie, Alicia Abshire in the 2022 TV series adaptation of The Time Traveler's Wife, and Bridget in the television series The Gilded Age.

Richardson began performing in local theatre and dance productions as a child, before her Broadway debut. Her experience in Annie influenced her decision to remain in New York City and pursue acting professionally. She had taken main roles in the 2015 film Jack of the Red Hearts, NBC's 2018 drama series Rise, and Netflix's 2020 film All Together Now (2020 film), before she appeared in HBO's The Time Traveler's Wife and The Gilded Age more recently.

== Early life ==
Richardson was raised in Richmond, Virginia with her mother, Tiffany Richardson. She participated in local theater and dance groups since she was 3 years old.

She lives in New York City ever since she was 10 years old, when she performed in the 2012 Broadway revival of Annie.

== Career ==
=== 2012–2018: Broadway and early film debuts ===
Richardson made her Broadway debut at 11 years old in 2012 when she took part in Broadway's second revival of Annie at Palace Theatre in New York City. Richardson replaced Lilla Crawford since 30 July 2012, but shared the role with Sadie Sink. The producers had decided that each girl will play Annie for four of the eight-shows each week. The girl not playing the title role will go on as Duffy.

After Annie the musical, Richardson made her film debut in A Most Violent Year as Elizabeth Morales. In addition, Richardson is featured in the 2014 film adaptation of Annie as a classmate known as red-haired Annie.

In 2015, Richardson played Glory Adams, an autistic teenager, in Jack of the Red Hearts. Richardson did research about autism before playing the character and co-created the character with the film's director, Janet Grillo.

In 2016, Richardson returned to stage acting in Noah Haidle's play Smokefall at Lucille Lortel Theatre. This happened because she replaced Julia Garner for the role of Beauty, as Garner had to drop out during rehearsals because of scheduling conflicts.

In 2017, Richardson made appearances in two films, Easy Living and The Super, as the characters Alice and Violet Lodge respectively.

=== 2018–2020: Slender Man, Rise, short films, All Together Now and God Friended Me ===
In 2018, she took part in the Slender Man film, playing the character Lizzie.

Then, Richardson made her TV debut in Rise, playing as Kaitlin Mazzuchelli, the theatre-loving daughter of Lou Mazzuchelli, played by Josh Radnor.

After Rise, Richardson took part in two short films, Shame and "Danni and Alyssa". For both, she also served as the writer. With the former, she directed it.

In 2020, she was in All Together Now, playing the character Jordan. In addition, she was a guest actress for one episode in the TV series God Friended Me, playing the character Kylie Marshall.

=== 2022–present: The Time Traveler's Wife, The Gilded Age, American Horror Story and upcoming works ===
In The Gilded Age, Richardson plays Bridget, a young Irish immigrant who serves the Van Rhijn family as a housemaid, kitchen-maid and ladies' maid. Richardson's role was tailored to her. This is because the character she originally auditioned for was Swedish. Hence, the producers made the character Irish because Richardson could only do that accent.

Richardson took part in the 2022 TV series adaptation of The Time Traveler's Wife, playing the character of Alicia Abshire, the younger sister of Clare Abshire, played by Rose Leslie.

Richardson then played Babette Eno in American Horror Story: Delicate, the twelfth season of American Horror Story, in three episodes.

In March 2026, Deadline reported that Richardson and Alexander MacNicoll had been cast in Change the Prophecy, a short film from writer and director Lindsay Grossman serving as a television proof-of-concept.

== Personal life ==
Richardson attended Columbia University School of General Studies where she studied film and media studies. She chose to study there because it accommodates students with nontraditional lives. The program allows her to work around her acting schedules. She described the challenge of balancing auditions, acting and academic assignments as feeling like having "a foot in two different worlds." Her professors accommodated occasional situations in which she needed to drop coursework because of acting commitments.

During her time playing as Bridget in The Gilded Age, Richardson learned she has a family member who immigrated from Ireland whose name was also Bridget.

Richardson is self-proclaimed Downton Abbey fan.

== Filmography ==
Key
†	Denotes films that have not yet been released

=== Film ===
Year	Title	Role	Notes
2014	A Most Violent Year	Elizabeth Morales	
2014	Annie	Red-haired Annie	
2015	Jack of the Red Hearts	Glory Adams	
2016	The Board	Susan	Short film
2017	Easy Living	Alice	
2017	The Super	Violet Lodge	
2018	Slender Man	Lizzie Knudsen	
2019	Shame	Maria	Short film, also writer and director
2019	Danni and Alyssa	Alyssa	Short film, also writer
2019	18 to Party	Missy	
2020	All Together Now	Jordan	
2022	Shadow Vaults	Meredith	
2026	Change the Prophecy †	Sarah Rowe	Short film

=== Television ===
Year	Title	Role	Notes
2018	Rise	Kaitlin Mazzuchelli	Main role; 10 episodes
2020	God Friended Me	Kylie Marshall	Episode: "Almost Famous"
2022	The Time Traveler's Wife	Alicia Abshire	Recurring role; 2 episodes
2022–present	The Gilded Age	Bridget	Main role (Seasons 2–present), Recurring (Season 1); 25 episodes
2023–2024	American Horror Story: Delicate	Babette Eno	Recurring role; 3 episodes

== Theater ==
Year	Title	Role	Notes
2009	White Christmas	Susan Waverly	Virginia Repertory
2012-2014	Annie	Annie and Duffy	Palace Theatre, Broadway
2014-2015	A Christmas Memory	Nelle	Irish Repertory Theatre
2016	Smokefall	Beauty	Lucille Lortel Theatre
