= Judy Reyes =

American actress (born 1967)

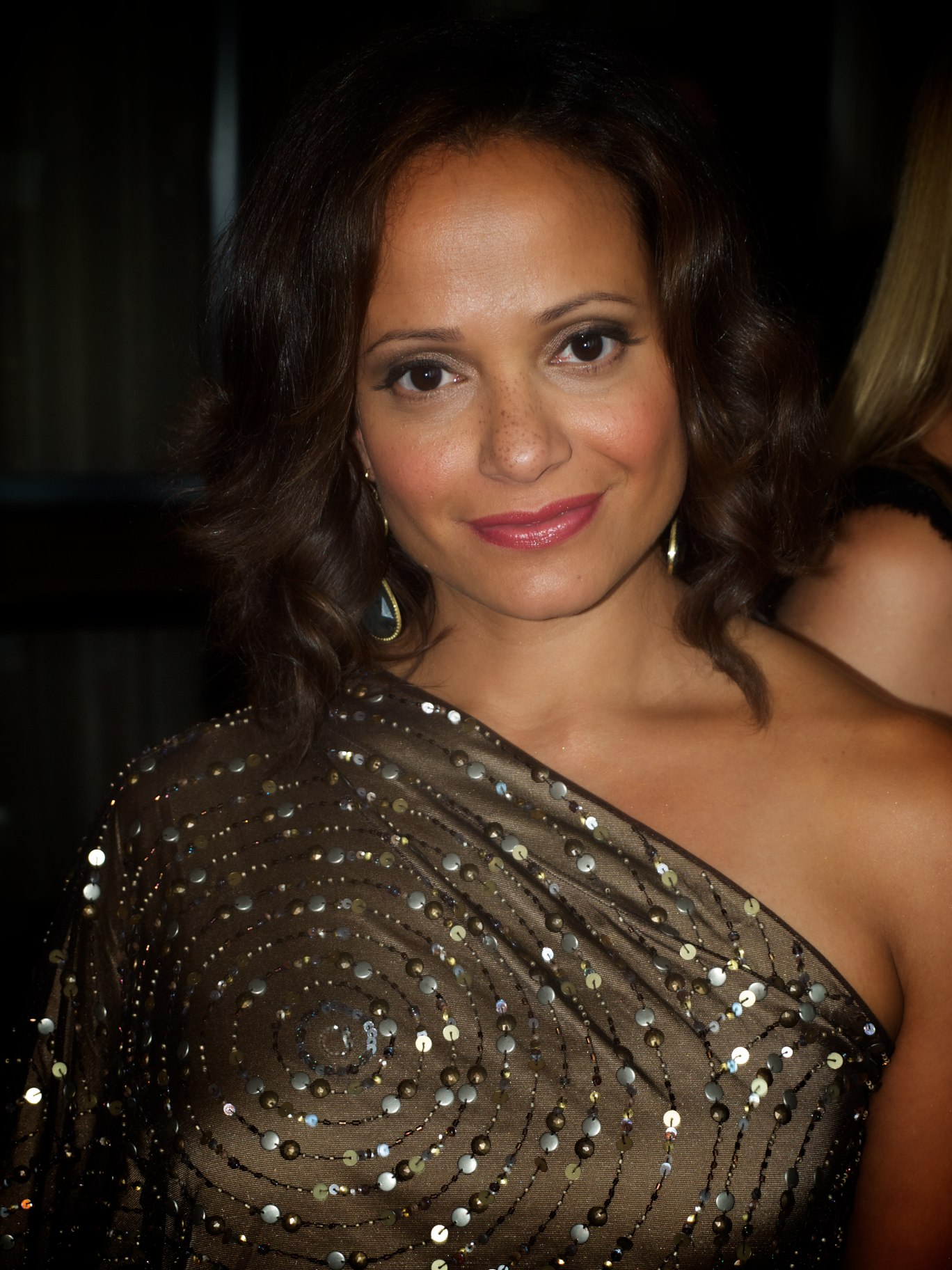
- Reyes in 2012
- Born: November 5, 1967 (age 59); New York City, U.S.
- Occupations: Actress; model; producer
- Years active: 1992–present
- Spouse(s): Edwin Figueroa (m. 1997; div. 2008)
- Partner: George Valencia (2008–present)
- Children: 1

Judy Reyes (born November 5, 1967) is an American actress, model, and producer, best known for her roles as Carla Espinosa on the NBC/ABC medical comedy series Scrubs and its revival (2001–2009, 2026–), as Zoila Diaz in the Lifetime comedy-drama Devious Maids (2013–2016), as Annalise "Quiet Ann" Zayas in the TNT crime comedy-drama Claws (2017–2022), and as Selena Soto in ABC crime drama series High Potential (2024–). Reyes also appeared in the films All Together Now (2020), Smile (2022), and Birth/Rebirth (2023), for which she received an Independent Spirit Award for Best Lead Performance nomination.

== Early life ==
Reyes was born on November 5, 1967, in the Bronx, New York City, to Dominican immigrants. She has three sisters, including a fraternal twin sister named Joselin Reyes, who played a paramedic on Law & Order: Special Victims Unit. Reyes grew up on Bainbridge Avenue, from the age of 13 to the age of 25–26. She attended Hunter College in Manhattan, where she began her acting career.

== Career ==
In the early 1990s, Reyes began her television career with guest starring roles in a number of shows, including Law & Order, NYPD Blue, and The Sopranos. She also had a recurring role in Oz as Tina Rivera. She is best known for her portrayal of nurse Carla Espinosa on the NBC comedy Scrubs from 2001 to 2009. She has starred in a number of made for television movies, primarily for Lifetime network, including Little Girl Lost: The Delimar Vera Story (2008), and The Pregnancy Project (2012).

After leaving Scrubs, Reyes guest-starred in several shows, including Castle, Medium, Off the Map, and Law & Order: Special Victims Unit. In 2011, she starred as a mother dealing with her estranged husband's return into her life after his stint in prison in the independent drama Gun Hill Road. The film is set in Reyes' native Bronx, and its title refers to a real-life street that intersects Bainbridge Avenue on which Reyes herself grew up. The film premiered at the Sundance Film Festival. Reyes also had small supporting roles in several films, including Went to Coney Island on a Mission from God... Be Back by Five (1998), Bringing Out the Dead (1999), Washington Heights (2002), and Dirty (2005).

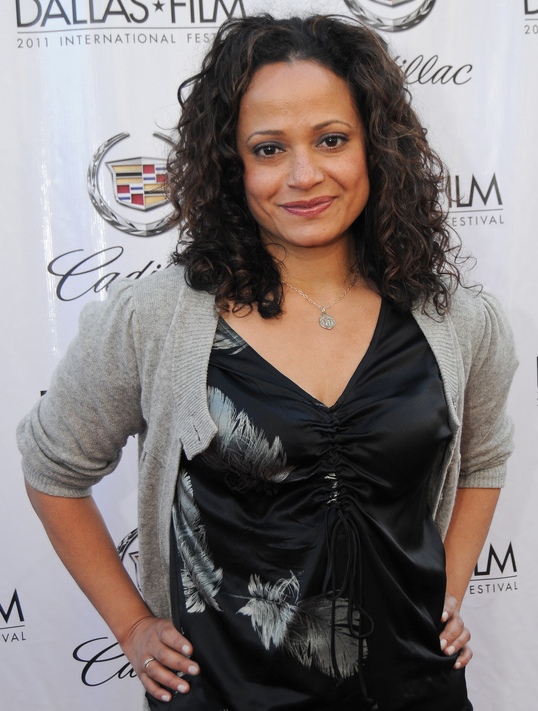
Reyes at the 2011 Dallas International Film Festival

In 2012, Reyes was cast as series regular Zoila Diaz, the senior maid, in the ABC comedy-drama pilot Devious Maids, created by Marc Cherry. On May 14, 2012, the series was not picked up by ABC, but on June 22, 2012, Lifetime ordered a run of thirteen episodes. The series premiered June 23, 2013. The Devious Maids finale episode aired on August 8, 2016. Two weeks following the show's cancellation, Reyes was cast opposite Niecy Nash in the TNT crime comedy-drama Claws playing the role of Annalise "Quiet Ann" Zayas. The series premiered on June 11, 2017 and ended in 2022 after four seasons. She also had the recurring roles as Dina Milagro in the CW comedy series Jane the Virgin (2015–19) and as Ramona in the Netflix comedy One Day at a Time (2017–2020). She played the role of Eva, executive producer of media conglomerate Waystar Royco's ATN news channel, in the HBO drama series Succession in 2018. Reyes also had a recurring roles in the comedy series Search Party and Better Things, and guest starred on Black-ish. In 2022, Reyes guest-starred in season 3 of Batwoman where she portrayed Kiki Roulette who was responsible for building Joker's joy buzzer.

Reyes starred in the independent films My Name Is David (2015) and Girl Flu. (2016), and had a supporting role in the thriller film The Circle (2017). She received Imagen Awards for Best Actress - Drama (Television) for her performance in the 2021 made-for-television film Torn from Her Arms. She appeared opposite her One Day at a Time co-star Justina Machado in the 2020 drama film, All Together Now. In 2022, she had a supporting role in the supernatural horror film, Smile; it was a box office success, grossing over $217 million worldwide. The following year, Reyes played the leading role in the psychological horror film, Birth/Rebirth. It premiered at the Sundance Film Festival and Reyes received positive reviews for her performance. She received an Independent Spirit Award for Best Lead Performance nomination for her performance. Also in 2023, Reyes had a recurring role in the horror-comedy series The Horror of Dolores Roach, appearing again opposite Justina Machado.

Reyes appeared as the mother of the lead character in the romantic drama film, Turtles All the Way Down based on the 2017 novel of the same name by John Green. She also was cast opposite Kaitlin Olson in a series regular role in the ABC comedy-drama series High Potential based on the French series HPI.

== Personal life ==
Reyes was married to cinematographer Edwin Figueroa.

Reyes is in a relationship with director George Valencia. Together, they founded the non-profit Sound of GOL Foundation!, a "recreational past time charity for young girls". They have a son together, born in 2009, who identifies as transgender.

== Filmography ==
=== Film ===
Key
| † | Denotes films that have not yet been released |

| Year | Title | Role | Notes |
|---|---|---|---|
| 1992 | Jack and His Friends | Rosie | |
| 1996 | No Exit | Maria Lentini | Direct-to-video |
| 1997 | Lena's Dreams | Martisa | |
| 1998 | Went to Coney Island on a Mission from God... Be Back by Five | Waitress | |
| 1998 | Godzilla | Woman #1 | Uncredited |
| 1999 | Bringing Out the Dead | ICU Nurse | |
| 2000 | King of the Jungle | Lydia Morreto | |
| 2002 | Washington Heights | Daisy | |
| 2004 | King of the Corner | Nurse Kathleen Delehant | |
| 2005 | Dirty | Bryant | |
| 2008 | The Poker Club | Detective Patterson | |
| 2008 | Glow Ropes: The Rise and Fall of a Bar Mitzvah Emcee | Vanessa Dupree | |
| 2011 | Gun Hill Road | Angela Rodriguez | |
| 2011 | Without Men | Magnolia | Direct-to-video |
| 2011 | Kaylien | Teacher | Short film |
| 2015 | My Name Is David | His Neighbor | |
| 2016 | Girl Flu. | Celeste | |
| 2017 | The Circle | Congresswoman Olivia Santos | |
| 2020 | All Together Now | Donna | |
| 2022 | Smile | Victoria Muñoz | |
| 2022 | Christmas, No Filter | Carol | |
| 2023 | Birth/Rebirth | Celie | Nominated — Independent Spirit Award for Best Lead Performance |
| 2024 | Turtles All the Way Down | Gina Holmes | |
| 2024 | Our Little Secret | Margaret | |

=== Television ===
| Year | Title | Role | Notes |
|---|---|---|---|
| 1992 | Law & Order | Maria Barragon | Episode: "Sisters of Mercy" |
| 1993 | Street Justice | Jody | Episode: "Countdown" |
| 1994 | As the World Turns | Nita | Episode #1.9826 |
| 1994 | The Cosby Mysteries | Laura Montero | Episode: "Only You" |
| 1994 | New York Undercover | Helena | Episode: "After Shakespeare" |
| 1995 | CBS Schoolbreak Special | Giselle | Episode: "Stand Up" |
| 1996 | NYPD Blue | Anna Ortiz | Episode: "Where'd the Van Gogh?" |
| 1996 | The Prosecutors | Maria Valquez | Television film |
| 1997 | Cosby | Miss Reyes | Episode: "About My Life" |
| 1997 | Nothing Sacred | Maritza | Episodes: "Proofs for the Existence of God" and "Song of Songs" |
| 1998 | Trinity | Mrs. Cupideros | Episode: "In Loco Parentis" |
| 1999 | Mind Prey | Det. Vega | Television film |
| 1999–2002 | Oz | Tina Rivera | Recurring role, 5 episodes |
| 2000 | The Sopranos | Michelle | Episode: "From Where to Eternity" |
| 2000 | Madigan Men | Vera the Dog Walker | Episode: "Pilot" |
| 2001 | 100 Centre Street | Olivia | Episode: "Things Change" |
| 2001 | Third Watch | Gina Fuentes | Episodes: "Requiem for a Bantamweight" and "Unfinished Business" |
| 2001 | WW 3 | Maria Cruz | Television film |
| 2001–2009 | Scrubs | Nurse Carla Espinosa | Series regular, 169 episodes ALMA Award for Outstanding Actress in a Television Series (2006, 2008); Nominated - ALMA Award for Outstanding Actress in a Television Series (2002, 2009); Nominated - Imagen Award for Best Actress - Television (2005, 2007) |
| 2003 | Blue's Clues | Carmen | Episode: "Blue's Big Car Trip" |
| 2005 | Strong Medicine | Jane Lopez | Episode: "Family Practice" |
| 2006 | Our House | Billy | Television film |
| 2008 | Little Girl Lost: The Delimar Vera Story | Luz Cuevas | Television film Nominated - Imagen Award for Best Actress - Television |
| 2009 | Castle | Theresa Candela | Episode: "Little Girl Lost" |
| 2009 | Hawthorne | Vita Gonzalez | Episode: "No Guts, No Glory" |
| 2010 | Medium | Jane Livingston | Episode: "Native Tongue" |
| 2010 | Ask Alan | Vanessa | Television film |
| 2011 | Off the Map | Eva Moran | Episodes: "It's Good" and "Es Un Milagro" |
| 2011 | Law & Order: Special Victims Unit | Inez Rivera | Episode: "Blood Brothers" |
| 2012 | The Pregnancy Project | Juana | Television film Nominated - Imagen Award for Best Supporting Actress - Television |
| 2012 | Happily Divorced | Teresa | Episode: "Cesar’s Wife" |
| 2012 | Randy Cunningham: 9th Grade Ninja | Señora Jorge (voice) | Episode: "Viva El Nomicon" |
| 2013–2016 | Devious Maids | Zoila Diaz | Series regular, 48 episodes Nominated-Imagen Award for Best Actress - Television (2014, 2015) |
| 2015 | iZombie | Lola Abano | Episode: "Brother, Can You Spare a Brain?" |
| 2015 | Fresh Off the Boat | Mindy Torres | Episode: "Good Morning Orlando" |
| 2015–2017, 2019 | Jane the Virgin | Dina Milagro | Recurring role, 11 episodes |
| 2016 | The Good Wife | Nola Gades | Episode: "Monday" |
| 2016 | Blue Bloods | Coryna Garza | Episode: "For the Community" |
| 2017–2020 | One Day at a Time | Ramona | Recurring role, 10 episodes |
| 2017–2022 | Claws | Annalise "Quiet Ann" Zayas | Series regular, 40 episodes |
| 2017, 2020 | Search Party | Deb | Episodes: "Suspicion", "Obsession", "Denial" and "The Reckoning" |
| 2018 | Succession | Eva | Episodes: "Shit Show at the Fuck Factory", "Lifeboats" and "Sad Sack Wasp Trap" |
| 2018 | Dirty John | Verga | Episodes: "Red Flags and Parades" and "Remember It Was Me" |
| 2019–2022 | Better Things | Lala | Episodes: "No Limits", "Show Me the Magic", "Escape Drill" and "We Are Not Alone" |
| 2020 | Black-ish | Dr. Paul | Episode: "Hero Pizza" |
| 2021 | Torn from Her Arms | Thelma Garcia | Television film Imagen Award for Best Actress - Drama (Television) |
| 2022 | Batwoman | Kiki Roulette | Episodes: "Broken Toys" and "We’re All Mad Here" |
| 2023 | Party Down | Sacker | Episode: "KSGY-95 Prizewinner's Luau" |
| 2023 | Florida Man | Capt. Donna Delgado | 2 episodes |
| 2023 | The Horror of Dolores Roach | Marcie | 3 episodes |
| 2023 | Dr. Death | Kim Verdi | Recurring role, 7 episodes |
| 2024–present | High Potential | Selena Soto | Main role |
| 2026–present | Scrubs | Nurse Carla Espinosa | Recurring role |

== See also ==
- List of Afro-Latinos
