= Sam McCarthy =

Sam McCarthy may refer to:

- Sam McCarthy (singer)
- Sam McCarthy (actor)
