= David O. Russell =

American filmmaker (born 1958)

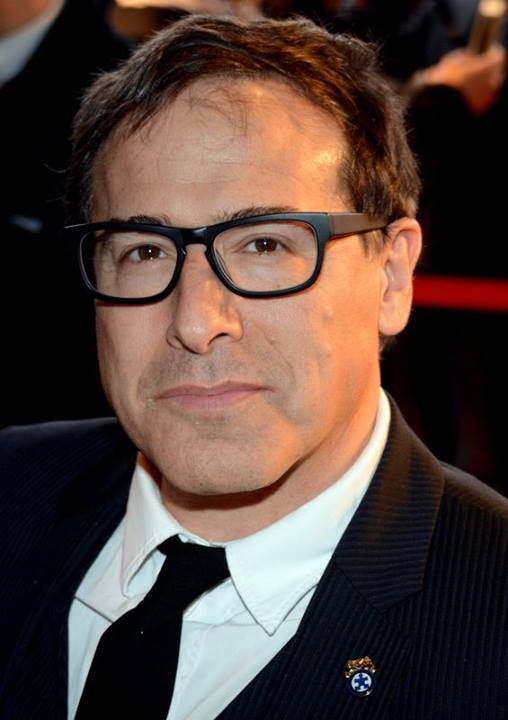
- Russell at the Paris premiere of American Hustle in February 2014
- Born: August 20, 1958 (age 68); New York City, US
- Education: Amherst College (B.A.)
- Occupations: Film director; screenwriter; producer
- Years active: 1987–present
- Spouse: Janet Grillo (m. 1992; div. 2007)
- Partner: Holly Davis (2007–present)
- Children: 2

David Owen Russell (born August 20, 1958) is an American film director, screenwriter and producer. He has earned numerous accolades including two British Academy Film Awards, and a Golden Globe Award as well as nominations for five Academy Awards.

Russell started his career directing the dark comedy films Spanking the Monkey (1994), Flirting with Disaster (1996), Three Kings (1999), and I Heart Huckabees (2004). He gained critical success with the biographical sports drama The Fighter (2010), the romantic comedy-drama Silver Linings Playbook (2012), and the dark comedy crime film American Hustle (2013). The three films were commercially successful and acclaimed by critics, earning him three Academy Award nominations for Best Director, as well as a Best Adapted Screenplay nomination for Silver Linings Playbook and a Best Original Screenplay nomination for American Hustle. Russell received his seventh Golden Globe nomination for the semi-biographical comedy-drama Joy (2015). He also directed the comedic mystery thriller Amsterdam (2022) and the biographical sports drama Madden (2026).

Across his career, Russell has been widely noted for combative and abusive behavior toward crew members and actors in his films, including documented incidents with George Clooney, Lily Tomlin, Amy Adams, Christopher Nolan, and Christian Bale.

== Early life and education ==
David Owen Russell was born on August 20, 1958, in New York City. He raised in the suburb of Larchmont, New York, in an upper middle-class household. His parents worked for Simon & Schuster; his father, Bernard, was the vice president of sales for the company, and his mother, Maria, was a secretary there. His father was from a Russian-Jewish family, and his mother was Italian-American (of Lucanian descent). His paternal grandfather, a butcher from the Upper West Side of Manhattan, lost many of his relatives in concentration camps.

When he was 13, Russell made his first film for a school project and used a Super 8 film camera to film people in New York City. He attended Mamaroneck High School, where he was voted "Class Rebel". He fell in love with film in his teens (his favorite movies included Taxi Driver, Chinatown, and Shampoo) but aspired to become a writer; Russell started a newspaper in high school and wrote short stories. As his parents worked in the publishing industry, he grew up in a household filled with books.

In 1981, Russell received his A.B. degree from Amherst College, where he majored in English and political science. He wrote his senior thesis on the United States intervention in Chile from 1963 to 1973.

== Career ==
=== 1987–1994: Early career and directorial debut ===
After graduating from Amherst, Russell traveled to Nicaragua and taught in a Sandinista literacy program. He worked in waitering, bartending, and catering. Some of his bartending colleagues included members of the Blue Man Group. He worked for a booksellers' association and later became a community organizer in Maine. He used video equipment to document slums and bad housing conditions, which later became a documentary of Lewiston, Maine. Russell was a political activist and canvassed and raised money in neighborhoods; he also did community work in Boston's South End. In addition to working in several day jobs, he began to write short films.

Russell directed a documentary about Panamanian immigrants in Boston, which led to a job as a production assistant on a PBS series called Smithsonian World. In 1987, Russell wrote, produced, and directed Bingo Inferno: A Parody on American Obsessions, a short film about an obsessive bingo-playing mother. Two years later, he made another short titled Hairway to the Stars, which featured Bette Davis and William Hickey. Both shorts were shown at the Sundance Film Festival.

After Russell made an award-winning short film for a Boston television station, he received grants from the New York State Council on the Arts and the National Endowment for the Arts. Instead of the money going towards a feature about a fortune cookie writer, he decided to make Spanking the Monkey, a film about an incestuous mother-son relationship. As a result, Russell had to return the funds to the NEA. Spanking the Monkey, the 1994 independent dark comedy, was his first directorial effort. The film was produced by Dean Silvers, and starred Jeremy Davies as a troubled young man and Alberta Watson as his lonely mother. Despite the controversial subject matter, the film received positive reviews and won him Best First Screenplay and Best First Feature from the Independent Spirit Awards, as well as the Audience Award at the Sundance Film Festival.

=== 1996–2008: Comedic films ===
His next project was the Miramax comedy Flirting with Disaster (1996), his second collaboration with Dean Silvers, and first with Harvey Weinstein. The film follows a neurotic man (Ben Stiller) who travels with his wife (Patricia Arquette) and a high-strung caseworker (Téa Leoni) to find his biological parents. The film also starred Mary Tyler Moore, George Segal, Alan Alda, Josh Brolin, Richard Jenkins, and Lily Tomlin. It was screened in the Un Certain Regard section at the Cannes Film Festival, and was well received by most critics. Roger Ebert said of the direction, "Russell finds the strong central line all screwball begins with, the seemingly serious mission or quest, and then throws darts at a map of the United States as he creates his characters." Lisa Schwarzbaum of Entertainment Weekly gave the film a 'B' and declared it "one of the ha-ha funniest comedies currently at a theater near you."

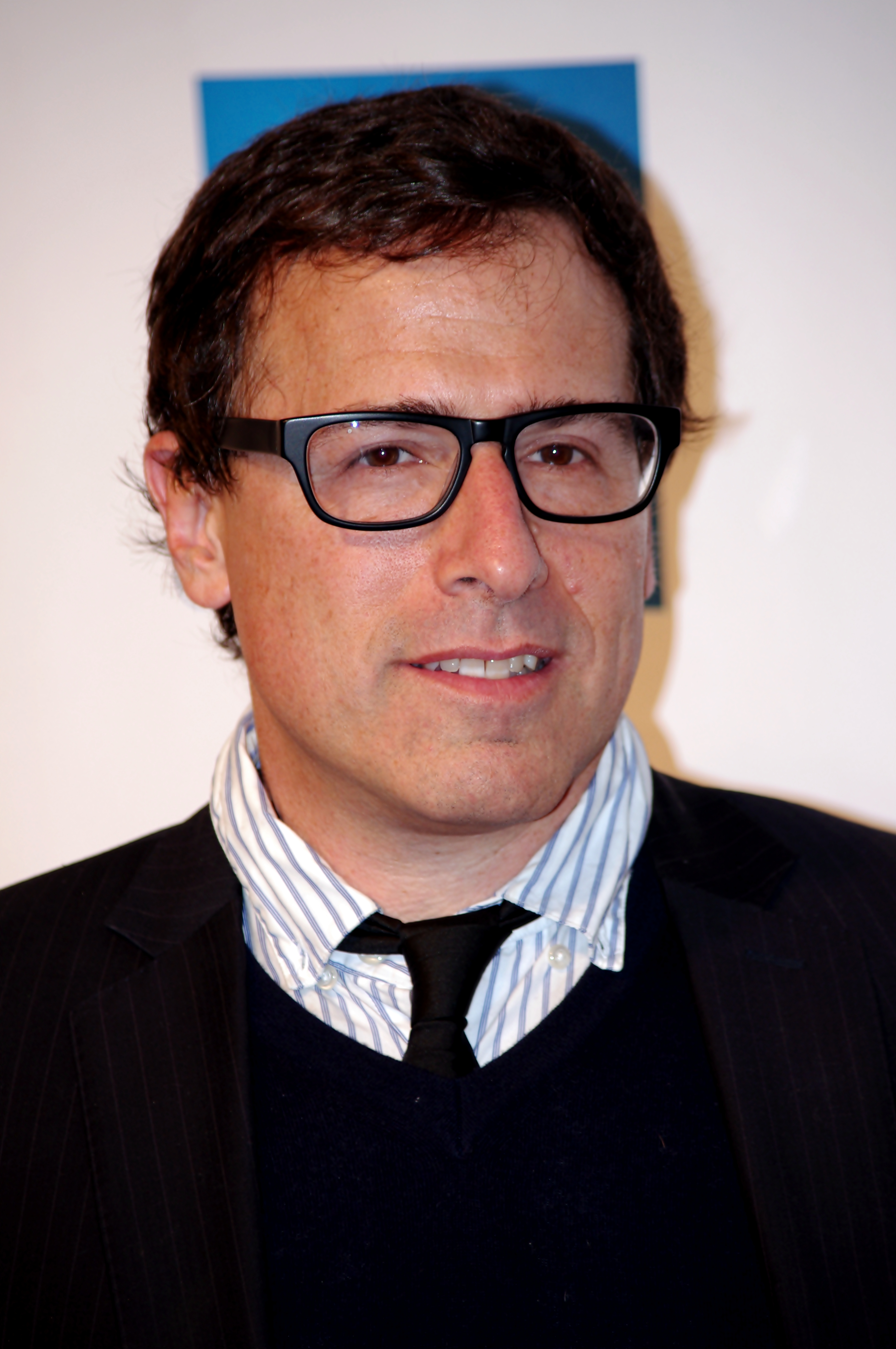
David O. Russell at the Tribeca Film Festival in 2011

The success of those two films led to the satirical Gulf War black comedy Three Kings (1999), starring George Clooney, Mark Wahlberg, Ice Cube and Spike Jonze. Adapted from an earlier script by former stand-up comic John Ridley, the film follows three American GIs who devise a plan to steal hidden Kuwaiti gold during the 1991 Iraqi uprising against Saddam Hussein. Filming in the deserts of Arizona, California and Mexico, and featuring actual Iraqi refugees as extras, Russell used several unique cinematic techniques to achieve realism. He filmed using handheld cameras and Steadicam, and shot on Ektachrome slide photography stock that was cross processed in color negative chemicals to reproduce "the odd color of the newspaper images [of the Gulf War]." He also insisted on filming all of the explosions in one shot, unlike a typical action film. Three Kings was released in 1999 and was his biggest critical and financial success. It grossed $60 million in the United States and over $100 million worldwide. It holds a 94% at Rotten Tomatoes, with the consensus "Three Kings successfully blends elements of action, drama, and comedy into a thoughtful, exciting movie on the Gulf War."

Russell's next project was the existential comedy I Heart Huckabees (2004). During pre-production in 2003, it was reported that Jude Law dropped the film to star in Christopher Nolan's The Prestige (2006), but after Russell headlocked Nolan at a Hollywood party, demanding that "his fellow director show artistic solidarity and give up his star in order to save Huckabees", Nolan dropped Law from his film. I Heart Huckabees received mixed reviews and failed at the box office, but collaborator Jennifer Lawrence called it her favorite David O. Russell film.

Nailed is a political comedy co-written by Russell and Kristin Gore, and stars Jessica Biel, Jake Gyllenhaal, Tracy Morgan, Catherine Keener, Paul Reubens, James Brolin and Kirstie Alley. Production was delayed or shut down four times in 2008, resulting in IATSE shutting down production because the crew was not getting paid. Actor James Caan left mid-production "due to creative differences and [the] split was amicable." The film revolves around the character of Alice Eckle (played by Jessica Biel) who gets accidentally shot in the head with a nail by a clumsy workman, eliciting wild sexual urges. The uninsured Eckle goes on a crusade to Washington to fight for the rights of the bizarrely injured. She meets an immoral congressman (Jake Gyllenhaal) who takes advantage of her sex drive and capitalizes on her crusade as Eckle heads into her own career in politics. Russell ceased working on the film in 2010; it was retitled Accidental Love and was released on VOD on February 10, 2015, before a limited release on March 20, 2015

=== 2010–2015: Acclaim and awards success ===
In 2010, Russell returned with The Fighter, a biographical sports drama produced by and starring Mark Wahlberg. The film focuses on junior welterweight boxer Mickey Ward's rise to claim the WBU Light Welterweight title, as well as his difficult relationship with his mother, Alice Ward (Melissa Leo) and his older half-brother Dickie Eklund (Christian Bale). The film became a major critical and financial success, grossing $125 million, and appearing on several critics' year-end top ten lists. The Fighter also received seven Academy Award nominations, including Best Picture and Best Director for Russell, the first of his career, and earned awards for both Bale and Leo, for Best Supporting Actor and Best Supporting Actress, respectively.

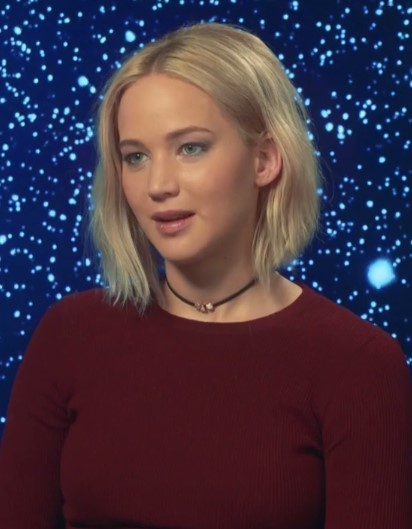
Russell directed Jennifer Lawrence to three Academy Award nominations and a win for Silver Linings Playbook

Silver Linings Playbook was adapted from the serio-comic novel by Matthew Quick. Bradley Cooper plays Pat and Robert De Niro, who starred with Cooper in Limitless, co-stars as his father. Jennifer Lawrence plays the lead female role of Tiffany. She commented about Russell, "He's really my favorite director since I started watching movies." The cast also includes Jacki Weaver, Chris Tucker and the veteran Bollywood actor Anupam Kher. The film was released in the United States and Canada on November 16, 2012. The film received critical acclaim and was a financial success.

Silver Linings Playbook is about a former teacher, Pat Solitano (Bradley Cooper), who has bipolar disorder, and moves back in with his family. He is initially obsessive about reuniting with his spouse after having discovered her with a lover and assaulting the man, but the story explores the development of his relationship with Tiffany Maxwell (Jennifer Lawrence). The film was inspired by Devereaux Glenholme School, a 12-month special education boarding school in Washington, Connecticut. Russell's son was a student there, and Russell said, "I was so familiar with the issues in the story that I knew how emotional and funny and original it could be. Without this community I would never have made this film."

Russell received numerous awards including the Hollywood Director Award at the 16th annual Hollywood Film Awards and an Indie Impact Award at the Palm Springs International Film Festival for his work on the film, as well as two Independent Spirit Awards (Best Director, Best Screenplay), two Satellite Awards (Best Director, Best Adapted Screenplay), a British Academy Film Award (Adapted Screenplay), and the American Film Institute Award for Movie of the Year. Silver Linings Playbook won the People's Choice Award at the 2012 Toronto International Film Festival and garnered four Golden Globe Award nominations (with one win for Jennifer Lawrence, Best Performance by an Actress in a Motion Picture – Musical or Comedy) and eight Academy Award nominations, including Best Picture, Best Director (Russell), Best Adapted Screenplay (Russell), Best Actor in a Leading Role (Bradley Cooper), Best Actress in a Leading Role (winner, Jennifer Lawrence), Best Supporting Actor (Robert De Niro), Best Supporting Actress (Jacki Weaver) and Best Film Editing (Jay Cassidy and Crispin Struthers).

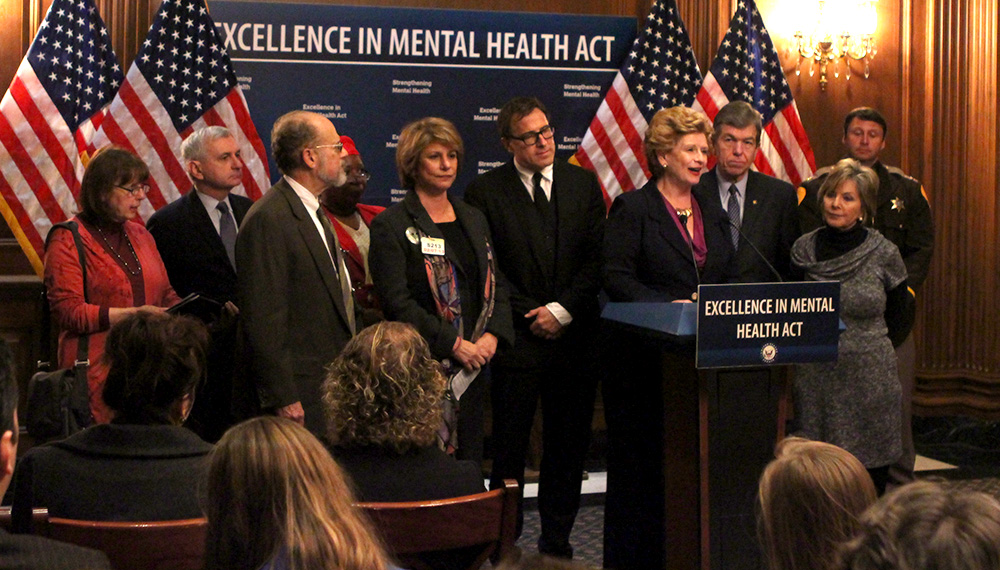
Russell with a bipartisan group of senators introducing the proposed bill, the Excellence in Mental Health Act in 2013

Russell's next project was American Hustle (2013), a comedy based on the ABSCAM scandal of the 1970s. The film's plot revolved around skilled con artists Irving Rosenfeld (Christian Bale) and Sydney Prosser (Amy Adams) being forced to work for unhinged FBI Agent Richie DiMaso (Bradley Cooper). Their complicated operation eventually involves Mayor Carmine Polito (Jeremy Renner) of Camden, New Jersey, as well as Irving's unpredictable wife Rosalyn (Jennifer Lawrence). The film reunited Russell with Bale and Adams after The Fighter, as well as with Cooper, Lawrence, and De Niro after Silver Linings Playbook. Saïd Taghmaoui, the Iraqi captain from Three Kings, also makes an appearance. The film received seven Golden Globe nominations, including Best Motion Picture Comedy and Best Director for Russell, and three wins including Best Motion Picture Comedy, Best Actress for Amy Adams and Best Supporting Actress for Jennifer Lawrence. Additionally, the film received ten Academy Award nominations, including Best Picture, Best Director, Best Actor, Best Actress, Best Supporting Actor and Best Supporting Actress, along with a Screen Actors Guild Award win for Outstanding Performance by a Cast in a Motion Picture.

In January 2014, it was announced that Russell would rewrite and direct a comedy-drama film about American inventor and entrepreneur Joy Mangano, a struggling Long Island single mother of three children. Jennifer Lawrence played the lead role in the film, Joy (2015). Principal photography began on February 17, 2015, and the film was released on December 25, 2015. It received mixed to positive reviews, focusing mainly on Larwence's strong performance, Russell's direction, and the supporting performances by Diane Ladd, Robert De Niro, and others. Featured music in the film was a driving force behind the narrative, including a reworked a cappella version of Cream's "I Feel Free". Strong box office greeted the film's first five days, with a $5900-per-screen average, and $25 million in gross receipts, according to Box Office Mojo; it grossed a worldwide total of over $101 million. The film was nominated for 2 Golden Globe Awards, including Best Musical or Comedy, and Best Actress in a Musical or Comedy for Jennifer Lawrence, which she won. Lawrence was also nominated for the Academy Award for Best Actress, the film's only Oscar nomination.

=== 2016–present ===
Written and directed by Russell, Past Forward was a short film collaboration between the director and Prada. A clip of the film premiered in September 2016 at Milan Fashion Week, and premiered November 2016 in Los Angeles. In the short film, Russell uses three actors for the same roles including Kuoth Wiel, Freida Pinto and Allison Williams. The film has been described as a "surreal dreamscape with an eclectic cast replaying scenes in shifting combinations".

In January 2020, it was announced that Russell would write and direct Amsterdam, produced by Regency Enterprises. Russell teamed up with Bale for the third time, with Margot Robbie also joining the film. In October 2020 it was announced that John David Washington had joined the cast, with filming scheduled to begin in January 2021. The same month that filming began, Rami Malek and Zoe Saldaña joined the cast. A trailer was released in July 2022, announcing the casting of Chris Rock, Anya Taylor-Joy, Mike Myers, Michael Shannon, Andrea Riseborough, Matthias Schoenaerts, Alessandro Nivola, Taylor Swift, and Robert De Niro. The film received negative reviews with Manohla Dargis of The New York Times writing, "Throughout, Russell keeps going and moving, moving and going, but the momentum never builds the way it should, and the big reveal lands flat partly because he never seems taken with the history he's latched onto or comfortable with its heaviness". The film was a box-office bomb, with estimated losses for the studio of over $100 million.

It was announced in May 2023 that Will Ferrell had entered early negotiations to star as football legend John Madden in the film biopic Madden, with Russell set to direct from a screenplay by Cambron Clark. In August the following year, the part was recast for Nicolas Cage.

== Ghetto Film School ==
David O. Russell was on the board of Ghetto Film School (GFS), an organization founded in 2000 to educate American storytellers. Russell learned about GFS in 2002 from two students who introduced him to Joe Hall, president of Ghetto Film School. Shortly after, Russell joined the board of the organization. Along with fellow board members, Russell brought filmmaker friends, industry and movie studio professionals to donate money and lend their time teaching classes to support young black and Latino filmmakers from the South Bronx and Harlem.

On June 16, 2014, Ghetto Film School opened its new branch in Los Angeles. This was thanks in part to Russell with an assist from 21st Century Fox co-COO James Murdoch. In October 2015, Russell and Jim Gianopulos hosted the premiere of Ghetto Film School Los Angeles fellows' thesis film Demon's Gate.

== Frequent collaborators ==
=== Cast ===
Work Actor	1996	1999	2004	2010	2012	2013	2015	2022	2026	—N/a	Ref.
Work Actor	Flirting with Disaster	Three Kings	I Heart Huckabees	The Fighter	Silver Linings Playbook	American Hustle	Joy	Amsterdam	Madden	Total	Ref.
Amy Adams				X mark		X mark				2	
Christian Bale				X mark		X mark		X mark	X mark	4	
Colleen Camp						X mark	X mark	X mark	X mark	4	
Bradley Cooper					X mark	X mark	X mark			3	
Robert De Niro					X mark	X mark	X mark	X mark		4	
Paul Herman					X mark	X mark				2	
Jennifer Lawrence					X mark	X mark	X mark			3	
Erica McDermott				X mark		X mark				2	
Elisabeth Röhm						X mark	X mark			2	
Saïd Taghmaoui		X mark	X mark			X mark				3	
Lily Tomlin	X mark		X mark							2	
Mark Wahlberg		X mark	X mark	X mark						3	
Shea Whigham					X mark	X mark				2	

=== Crew ===
Editor Jay Cassidy worked with Russell on Silver Linings Playbook, American Hustle, Joy, and Amsterdam. Crispin Struthers and Alan Baumgarten also edited several films for Russell. Producers Dean Silvers, Megan Ellison, and Jonathan Gordon have worked with him two and three times, respectively. Linus Sandgren was cinematographer for American Hustle and Joy.

== Personal life ==
=== Marriage and family ===
Russell was married to Janet Grillo, a producer at Fine Line Features, from 1992 to 2007. He has been with his partner, Holly Davis, since 2007. Davis is a costume designer. Russell has two children: one with Grillo and an adopted son with Davis. He resides in Santa Monica, California.

=== Mental illness activism ===
He is an advocate for mental illness treatment and support, and an active supporter of autism research. Russell's efforts saw him named the Essential Puzzle Piece honoree by Autism Speaks at the 2015 Light Up the Night Gala for Autism. In 2013, Russell visited Washington, D.C., to meet with vice president Joe Biden and Senator Debbie Stabenow to discuss a new bill regarding mental healthcare. In May 2014, Russell participated in a panel at Paley Center for the Media that discussed projects that have brought to light the stigmas and suffering associated with mental illness. Russell serves on the creative council of Represent.Us, a nonpartisan anti-corruption organization.

== Misconduct allegations ==
=== Sexual assault allegation ===
In December 2011, Russell's 19-year-old transgender niece, Nicole Peloquin, filed a police report alleging Russell had sexually assaulted her. The case was closed without charges because there were no witnesses. According to the police report, Russell offered to help Peloquin with abdominal exercises, during which his hand hovered above her genitals. After inquiring about the hormones she used to increase breast size, Russell slipped his hands under her shirt and felt both breasts.

Russell confirmed that the incident happened, but told police that Peloquin was "acting very provocative toward him" and invited him to feel her breasts. He also admitted to being "curious about the breast enhancement." This incident was also directly mentioned in the 2014 Sony Pictures hack.

=== Abuse of actors and crew ===
Throughout his career, Russell has developed a reputation for being combative and abusive toward crew and actors in his films, including George Clooney, Lily Tomlin, and Amy Adams. His reputation extends off-set, as Russell physically assaulted Christopher Nolan in 2003 at a party in Hollywood, putting Nolan in a headlock. In March 2024, at Chanel's Oscar party, Russell allegedly punched Sony film exec Sanford Panitch in the stomach after he accidentally tripped over Russell's leg.

==== 1998 incident ====
During the filming of Three Kings, news spread that Russell and George Clooney nearly had a fistfight on set. In a 2000 interview, Clooney described his confrontation with Russell after tensions on the set had been steadily increasing. According to Clooney, Russell was demeaning the crew verbally and physically. Clooney felt this was out of line and told Russell, "David, it's a big day. But you can't shove, push or humiliate people who aren't allowed to defend themselves." After that, the confrontation escalated when, according to Sharon Waxman in her book Rebels on the Backlot, Russell actually head-butted Clooney and Clooney grabbed Russell by the throat. Clooney said Russell eventually apologized and filming continued, but Clooney described the experience as "truly, without exception, the worst experience of my life." When asked if he would work with Russell again, Clooney responded, "Life's too short."

In early 2012, Clooney indicated that he and Russell had mended their relationship, saying "We made a really, really great film, and we had a really rough time together, but it's a case of both of us getting older. I really do appreciate the work he continues to do, and I think he appreciates what I'm trying to do." However, in a 2024 interview, Clooney ruled out working with Russell again.

==== 2003 incident ====
Russell had conflicts with Lily Tomlin during the filming of I Heart Huckabees, and in March 2007, two videos were leaked onto YouTube portraying on-set arguments between Russell and Tomlin, in which among other things he called her sexist names.

Russell's behavior was first reported in a 2004 The New York Times article by Sharon Waxman in which she describes him calling Tomlin "the crudest word imaginable, in front of the actors and crew." Additionally, Waxman describes Russell storming off the set and back on again, continually shouting, which is corroborated by the leaked videos. On the set, actors were sometimes driven to their wits' ends after hours of takes. Afterward, Tomlin remarked that she and Russell are "fine", saying, "I'd rather have someone human and available and raw and open. Don't give me someone cold, or cut off, or someone who considers themselves dignified."

In a 2011 interview with Movieline, Tomlin was asked about the incident and she replied:

It happens sometimes—but David is a very mercurial person, and that's part of why he's so brilliant. He almost reflects the movie. I did two movies with him, and I Heart Huckabees was so crazy, so all over the place, I think he kind of embodies intuitively whatever he's trying to make happen. It was just crazy, crazy stuff. We were always doing something, and then we'd get manic and crazy and I just flipped out on him. Then he flipped out on me. And you know, stuff goes on. But it's nothing. It's like family. If you have a big fight in your family, usually it's treated that way on the set. We don't want to misbehave; believe me, it's embarrassing. It's humiliating, you know? Because you just lose it. You act like a crazy person. [Laughs] But I adore David. I adore him as a talent. A lot of my friends said, "Well, you won't work with him again." I said, "Of course I would! I adore him, I love him. He's brilliant."

During the 2012 Gotham Awards, host Mike Birbiglia roasted Russell by reading a transcript of Russell's argument with Lily Tomlin. The event, specifically the joke and what transpired around it, later formed a large part of Birbiglia's show Thank God for Jokes.

==== 2013 incident ====
According to Salon, in the Sony Pictures Entertainment hack, it was revealed that Russell made Amy Adams's life "a living hell" during the production of American Hustle, and Christian Bale at one point intervened. Salon reported that, in an email to Sony chief Michael Lynton, journalist Jonathan Alter said: "He grabbed one guy by the collar, cursed out people repeatedly in front of others and so abused Amy Adams that Christian Bale got in his face and told him to stop acting like an asshole."

Adams confirmed the story in a 2016 British GQ interview, saying, "He was hard on me, that's for sure. It was a lot ... I was really just devastated on set". She also added she wouldn't want to work with Russell again. Adams added: "Jennifer [Lawrence] doesn't take any of it on. She's Teflon. And I am not Teflon. But I also don't like to see other people treated badly. It's not OK with me."

==== 2025 incident ====
According to a TMZ report, in May 2025 several actors and crew members on the set of Madden walked off after Russell allegedly used a racial slur and also tried to insert the slur into the script. Russell was also reportedly angered by an actor's objection to participating in a scene that involved nudity. But according to TMZ, sources close to Amazon MGM Studios disputed the reporting.

== Filmography ==
=== Film ===
Year	Title	Director	Writer	Producer	Ref.
1994	Spanking the Monkey	Yes	Yes	Executive	
1996	Flirting with Disaster	Yes	Yes	No	
1999	Three Kings	Yes	Yes	No	
2004	I Heart Huckabees	Yes	Yes	Yes	
2010	The Fighter	Yes	No	No	
2012	Silver Linings Playbook	Yes	Yes	No	
2013	American Hustle	Yes	Yes	No	
2015	Accidental Love	Yes (Note: Russell quit the project in 2010 and asked for his name to be removed. He ended up being credited as "Stephen Greene")	No	No	
2015	Joy	Yes	Yes	Yes	
2022	Amsterdam	Yes	Yes	Yes	
2026	Madden	Yes	Yes	Yes	

Acting roles

Year	Title	Notes	Ref
1999	Three Kings	Hollywood Action Star (uncredited cameo)	
2002	Adaptation	Orlean Dinner Guest (cameo)	

=== Short film ===
Year	Title	Director	Writer	Editor	Notes	Ref.
1987	Bingo Inferno: A Parody on American Obsessions	Yes	Yes	Yes		
1989	Hairway to the Stars	Yes	No	No		
2004	Soldiers Pay	Yes	No	Yes	Documentary short; Also producer and camera operator	
2016	Past Forward	Yes	Yes	No	In collaboration with Prada	

=== Television ===
Executive producer

- Outer Space Astronauts (2009)

Acting roles

Year	Title	Role	Notes	Ref
2011	Gossip Girl	Himself	2 episodes	
2023	All the Queen's Men	Tommy	Episode "Consequences and Repercussions"	

== Awards and nominations ==
Over the course of his career he has received numerous accolades including two British Academy Film Awards, a Golden Globe Award, and four Independent Spirit Awards as well as nominations for five Academy Awards and two Directors Guild of America Awards.

Year	Title	Academy Awards		BAFTA Awards		Golden Globe Awards	
Year	Title	Nominations	Wins	Nominations	Wins	Nominations	Wins
2010	The Fighter	7	2	3		6	2
2012	Silver Linings Playbook	8	1	3	1	4	1
2013	American Hustle	10		10	3	6	3
2015	Joy	1				2	1
2022	Amsterdam			1			
Total		26	3	17	4	18	7

Direction for Oscar-related performances

Year	Performer	Title	Result
Academy Award for Best Actor
2012	Bradley Cooper	Silver Linings Playbook	Nominated
2013	Christian Bale	American Hustle	Nominated
Academy Award for Best Actress
2012	Jennifer Lawrence	Silver Linings Playbook	Won
2013	Amy Adams	American Hustle	Nominated
2015	Jennifer Lawrence	Joy	Nominated
Academy Award for Best Supporting Actor
2010	Christian Bale	The Fighter	Won
2012	Robert De Niro	Silver Linings Playbook	Nominated
2013	Bradley Cooper	American Hustle	Nominated
Academy Award for Best Supporting Actress
2010	Melissa Leo	The Fighter	Won
2010	Amy Adams	The Fighter	Nominated
2012	Jacki Weaver	Silver Linings Playbook	Nominated
2013	Jennifer Lawrence	American Hustle	Nominated
