= All Together Now (2020 film) =

2020 American drama film

- Official poster
- Directed by: Brett Haley
- Screenplay by: Matthew Quick; Brett Haley; Marc Basch
- Based on: Sorta Like a Rockstar by Matthew Quick
- Produced by: Ellen Goldsmith-Vein; Lee Stollman; Isaac Klausner; Marty Bowen
- Starring: Auliʻi Cravalho; Rhenzy Feliz; Judy Reyes; Justina Machado; Taylor Richardson; C.S. Lee; Anthony Jacques Jr.; Gerald Issac Waters; Fred Armisen; Carol Burnett
- Cinematography: Rob C. Givens
- Edited by: Mollie Goldstein
- Music by: Keegan DeWitt
- Production companies: Temple Hill Entertainment: Gotham Group; Thunderhead Pictures
- Distributed by: Netflix
- Release date: August 28, 2020
- Running time: 92 minutes
- Country: United States
- Language: English

All Together Now is a 2020 American drama film directed by Brett Haley, from a screenplay by Haley, Marc Basch, and Matthew Quick. It is based upon the novel Sorta Like a Rockstar by Quick. It stars Auliʻi Cravalho, Justina Machado, Fred Armisen, Carol Burnett, Judy Reyes, Taylor Richardson, Rhenzy Feliz, Gerald Isaac Waters and Anthony Jacques.

It was released on August 28, 2020, by Netflix.

== Plot ==
High school senior Amber Appleton lives in Portland, Oregon with her mother Becky. They are temporarily homeless after Becky's boyfriend Oliver is abusive, so they end up sleeping in the school bus she drives.

Amber is very busy, including volunteer teaching an ESL class and working in an old age home, where she has bonded with Joan, a resident. She also plans an annual school variety show, the proceeds going to charity.

Amber is invited to audition for the drama program at Carnegie Mellon University, her deceased father's alma mater. With Becky's encouragement, she spends money they had been saving for rent for the flight.

Unfortunately, Becky is fired when it is discovered that they have been living in the bus. She decides to return to Oliver, but Amber refuses to join her. Sleeping on a park bench, Amber subsequently gets robbed.

After Amber confides in her friend Ty about her situation, Ty takes Amber to his family's vacation house to stay and help her prepare for her audition. She tells him that her father's death caused her mother to struggle and for them to be evicted and move in with Oliver, who eventually became abusive. Becky, who is an alcoholic, frequently suffers relapses while with him.

With the help of Donna, the mother of her friend Ricky, Amber tells Becky that she does not feel safe living with Oliver. They have an argument, Becky leaves and Amber stays at Donna's house. The following morning, police officers come to Amber's high school to inform her that her mother and Oliver have been killed in a single-car, drunk driving car accident.

On the day of her audition, Amber discovers that her dog Bobby is sick. She misses her flight to Pittsburgh to take him to the vet, where she learns he requires an expensive surgery. She drops out and begins working full-time in order to afford the surgery, forgoing a rescheduled audition at the college and losing contact with her friends. Ty confronts her and accuses her of rejecting help from others, so they stop speaking.

Amber plans to skip the variety show, but Ty surprises her at work, revealing that the proceeds will go towards paying for the dog's surgery. All of Amber's friends perform in the show, including the students from her ESL class. At the end of the evening, the fundraiser is still $2,000 short, but suddenly receives an anonymous donation of $200,000.

At the home, Joan reveals that she is the one who made the donation, as she considers her family. Amber gets another audition at Carnegie Mellon, and she and Ty share a kiss before she leaves.

== Cast ==
- Auliʻi Cravalho as Amber Appleton
- Rhenzy Feliz as Ty
- Judy Reyes as Donna
- Justina Machado as Becky Appleton
- Taylor Richardson as Jordan
- C.S. Lee as Father Chee
- Anthony Jacques Jr. as Ricky
- Gerald Isaac Waters as Chad
- Fred Armisen as Mr. Franks
- Carol Burnett as Joan
- Ryley Martin as Tommy
- Tin-Tin as Bobby Big Boy

== Production ==
=== Development ===
In August 2013, Fox Searchlight Pictures acquired screen rights to Sorta Like a Rock Star by Matthew Quick, and would produce and finance the film, with Temple Hill Entertainment and Gotham Group producing, with Laura Sandler and Amanda Harlib writing the film. In March 2016, it was announced Miguel Arteta would direct the film, with Ol Parker writing the script. In July 2017, it was announced Bryce Dallas Howard would direct the film, replacing Arteta and Fox Searchlight Pictures no longer involved. In November 2017, Netflix acquired distribution rights to the film, with Quick writing the screenplay.

=== Casting ===
In July 2019, Auliʻi Cravalho joined the cast of the film, with Brett Haley replacing Dallas Howard who departed due to scheduling conflicts. In September 2019, Carol Burnett, Fred Armisen, Rhenzy Feliz, Justina Machado, Judy Reyes, Gerald Isaac Waters, Taylor Richardson, and Anthony Jacques had joined the cast of the film.

=== Filming ===
Principal photography began in October 2019 in Portland, Oregon. Neighborhoods in northeast Portland have been used to film. Some of the homes used for filming were in the same neighborhoods as those featured in Fred Armisen's work, Portlandia.

== Release ==
All Together Now was released on August 28, 2020.

== Critical reception ==
On review aggregator website Rotten Tomatoes, the film holds an approval rating of 71% based on 24 reviews, with an average rating of 6.5/10. The website's critics consensus reads: "Elevated by Auli'i Cravalho's charming performance, All Together Now is an uplifting drama that stays largely on the right side of the line between sweet and cloying." On Metacritic, the film has a weighted average score of 64 out of 100, based on 11 critics, indicating "generally favorable" reviews.
