= All These Small Moments =

2019 film directed by Melissa Miller Costanzo

- Theatrical release poster
- Directed by: Melissa Miller Costanzo
- Written by: Melissa Miller Costanzo
- Produced by: Lauren Avinoam; Katie Leary; Jed Mellick
- Starring: Molly Ringwald; Brian d'Arcy James; Brendan Meyer; Sam McCarthy; Harley Quinn Smith; Jemima Kirke
- Cinematography: Adam Bricker
- Edited by: Russell Costanzo; Matt Garner
- Music by: Dan Lipton
- Production companies: Moving Pictures Artists; Big Vision Creative; Jemstone Productions; Vineyard Point Productions
- Distributed by: Orion Classics
- Release dates: April 24, 2018 (Tribeca Film Festival); January 17, 2019 (United States)
- Running time: 84 minutes
- Country: United States
- Language: English

All These Small Moments is a 2018 American coming-of-age drama film written and directed by Melissa Miller Costanzo. The film stars Molly Ringwald, Brian d'Arcy James, Brendan Meyer, Sam McCarthy, Harley Quinn Smith and Jemima Kirke. The film was released on January 17, 2019, by Orion Classics.

== Plot ==
The Sheffields are on the verge of divorce while their 16-year-old son becomes infatuated with an older woman.

== Cast ==
- Molly Ringwald as Carla Sheffield
- Brian d'Arcy James as Tom Sheffield
- Brendan Meyer as Howie Sheffield
- Sam McCarthy as Simon Sheffield
- Harley Quinn Smith as Lindsay
- Jemima Kirke as Odessa
- Roscoe Orman as Dr. Rogers
- David Joseph Craig as Customer
- Salena Qureshi as Katie
- Spenser Granese as Odessa's Husband
- Derek Michalak as Sebastian
- Jazzy Williams as Becca
- Margot Steinberg as Felicity Kavanagh
- Elijah Boothe as Carter
- Connor Johnston as Kevin
- Charlie Oh as Harry
- Evan Dominguez as Eduardo

== Release ==
The film premiered at the Tribeca Film Festival on April 24, 2018. On October 18, 2018, Orion Classics acquired distribution rights to the film. The film was released on January 17, 2019, by Orion Classics.

== Reception ==
Review aggregator website Rotten Tomatoes reported an 83% approval rating based on 18 reviews, with an average score of 6.3/10.
