= List of awards and nominations received by David O. Russell =

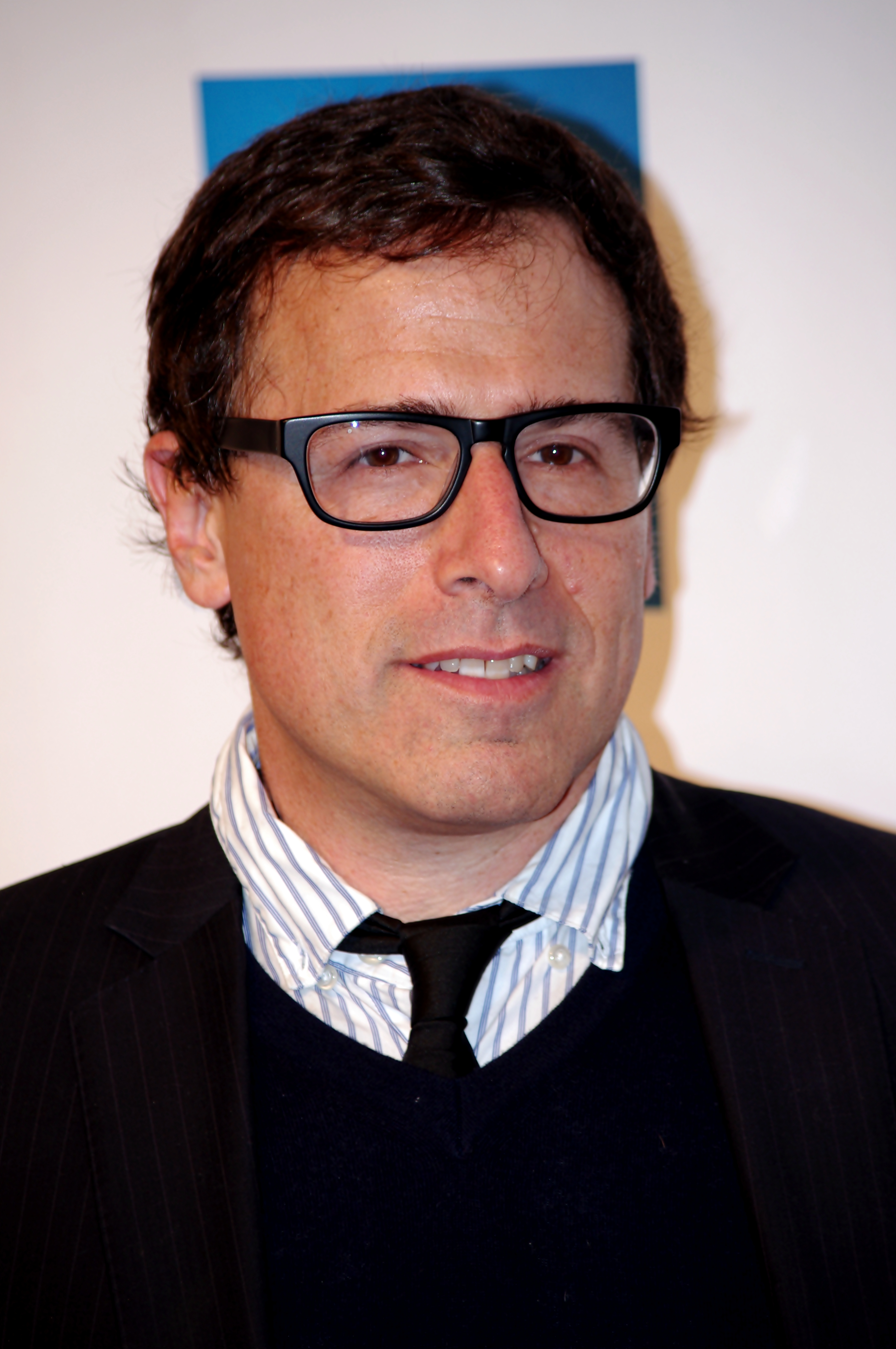
David O. Russell at the Tribeca Film Festival in 2011

The article is a List of awards and nominations received by David O. Russell.

David O. Russell is an American film director, screenwriter and producer. He has been nominated for five Academy Awards and four Golden Globes. He has won four Independent Spirit Awards and two British Academy Film Awards. He has been nominated for three Writers Guild of America awards and two Directors Guild of America awards. Regarding five Academy Award nominations, three for Best Director for The Fighter, Silver Linings Playbook and American Hustle and two for Best Adapted Screenplay for Silver Linings Playbook and American Hustle.

== Major associations ==
=== Academy Awards ===
Year	Category	Nominated work	Result	Ref.
2010	Best Director	The Fighter	Nominated	
2012	Best Director	Silver Linings Playbook	Nominated	
2012	Best Adapted Screenplay	Silver Linings Playbook	Nominated	
2013	Best Director	American Hustle	Nominated	
2013	Best Original Screenplay	American Hustle	Nominated	

=== BAFTA Awards ===
Year	Category	Nominated work	Result	Ref.
2012	Best Adapted Screenplay	Silver Linings Playbook	Won	
2013	Best Original Screenplay	American Hustle	Won	
2013	Best Direction	American Hustle	Nominated	

=== Golden Globe Awards ===
Year	Category	Nominated work	Result	Ref.
2010	Best Director	The Fighter	Nominated	
2012	Best Screenplay	Silver Linings Playbook	Nominated	
2013	Best Director	American Hustle	Nominated	
2013	Best Screenplay	American Hustle	Nominated	

== Industry awards ==
=== Directors Guild of America Award ===
Year	Category	Nominated work	Result	Ref.
2010	Outstanding Directing – Feature Film	The Fighter	Nominated	
2013	Outstanding Directing – Feature Film	American Hustle	Nominated	

=== Independent Spirit Awards ===
Year	Category	Nominated work	Result	Ref.
1994	Best First Feature	Spanking the Monkey	Won	
1994	Best First Screenplay	Spanking the Monkey	Won	
1996	Best Director	Flirting with Disaster	Nominated	
1996	Best Screenplay	Flirting with Disaster	Nominated	
2012	Best Director	Silver Linings Playbook	Won	
2012	Best Screenplay	Silver Linings Playbook	Won	

=== Writers Guild of America Award ===
Year	Category	Nominated work	Result	Ref.
1999	Best Original Screenplay	Three Kings	Nominated	
2012	Best Adapted Screenplay	Silver Linings Playbook	Nominated	
2013	Best Original Screenplay	American Hustle	Nominated	

== Miscellaneous awards ==
=== Alliance of Women Film Journalists ===
Year	Category	Nominated work	Result	Ref.
2013	Best Director	American Hustle	Nominated	
2013	Best Screenplay	American Hustle	Nominated	

=== Boston Society of Film Critics ===
Year	Category	Nominated work	Result	Ref.
1999	Best Director	Three Kings	Won	

=== Critics' Choice Awards ===
Year	Category	Nominated work	Result	Ref.
2012	Best Director	Silver Linings Playbook	Nominated	
2012	Best Adapted Screenplay	Silver Linings Playbook	Nominated	
2013	Best Director	American Hustle	Nominated	
2013	Best Original Screenplay	American Hustle	Nominated	

=== Detroit Film Critics Society ===
Year	Category	Nominated work	Result	Ref.
2013	Best Director	American Hustle	Nominated	
2013	Best Screenplay	American Hustle	Nominated	

=== Gotham Award ===
Year	Category	Nominated work	Result	Ref.
2004	Best Film	I Heart Huckabees	Nominated	

=== Hamptons International Film Festival ===
Year	Category	Nominated work	Result	Ref.
2012	Audience Award	Silver Linings Playbook	Won	

=== Hollywood Film Festival ===
Year	Category	Nominated work	Result	Ref.
2012	Director of the Year	Silver Linings Playbook	Won	

=== Los Angeles Film Critics Association ===
Year	Category	Nominated work	Result	Ref.
2012	Best Screenplay	Silver Linings Playbook	Won	

=== National Board of Review ===
Year	Category	Nominated work	Result	Ref.
2012	Best Adapted Screenplay	Silver Linings Playbook	Won	

=== National Society of Film Critics ===
Year	Category	Nominated work	Result	Ref.
1996	Best Screenplay	Flirting with Disaster	3rd Place	
1999	Best Director	Three Kings	2nd Place	
2012	Best Screenplay	Silver Linings Playbook	3rd Place	
2013	Best Screenplay	American Hustle	3rd Place	

=== New York Film Critics Circle ===
Year	Category	Nominated work	Result	Ref.
1994	Best New Director	Spanking the Monkey	Nominated	
2013	Best Director	American Hustle	Nominated	
2013	Best Screenplay	American Hustle	Won	

=== Online Film Critics Society ===
Year	Category	Nominated work	Result	Ref.
2013	Best Original Screenplay	American Hustle	Nominated	

=== Palm Springs International Film Festival ===
Year	Category	Nominated work	Result	Ref.
2010	Director of the Year	The Fighter	Won	
2012	Indie Impact Award	Silver Linings Playbook	Won	

=== PEN Literary Award ===
Year	Category	Nominated work	Result	Ref.
1999	PEN Center USA West Literary Award	Three Kings	Won	

=== Philadelphia Film Festival ===
Year	Category	Nominated work	Result	Ref.
2012	Audience Award – Honorable Mention	Silver Linings Playbook	Won	

=== San Diego Film Critics Society ===
Year	Category	Nominated work	Result	Ref.
2012	Best Director	Silver Linings Playbook	Nominated	
2012	Best Adapted Screenplay	Silver Linings Playbook	Nominated	

=== Satellite Award ===
Year	Category	Nominated work	Result	Ref.
1999	Three Kings	Best Original Screenplay	Nominated	
2012	Silver Linings Playbook	Best Director	Won	
2012	Silver Linings Playbook	Best Adapted Screenplay	Nominated	
2013	American Hustle	Best Original Screenplay	Won	
2013	American Hustle	Best Director	Nominated	

=== Southeastern Film Critics Association ===
Year	Category	Nominated work	Result	Ref.
1999	Best Director	Three Kings	2nd Place	
1999	Best Screenplay	Three Kings	3rd Place	

=== St. Louis Film Critics Association ===
Year	Category	Nominated work	Result	Ref.
2013	Best Director	American Hustle	Nominated	
2013	Best Original Screenplay	American Hustle	Nominated	

=== Sundance Film Festival ===
Year	Category	Nominated work	Result	Ref.
1994	Audience Award (Dramatic)	Spanking the Monkey	Won	
1994	Sundance Film Festival – Grand Jury Prize (Dramatic)	Spanking the Monkey	Nominated	

=== Toronto International Film Festival ===
Year	Category	Nominated work	Result	Ref.
2012	People's Choice Award	Silver Linings Playbook	Won	

=== Washington D.C. Area Film Critics Association ===
Year	Category	Nominated work	Result	Ref.
2012	Best Adapted Screenplay	Silver Linings Playbook	Won	
2013	Best Original Screenplay	American Hustle	Nominated	
