= Girl Flu. =

2016 American comedy film by Dorie Barton

- Film poster
- Directed by: Dorie Barton
- Written by: Dorie Barton
- Produced by: David K. Wilson; Jay Lowi
- Starring: Katee Sackhoff; Jade Pettyjohn; Jeremy Sisto; Judy Reyes; Heather Matarazzo
- Cinematography: Alice Brooks
- Edited by: John Alan Thompson
- Music by: John Ballinger
- Production company: Free Chicken Films
- Release date: June 6, 2016 (LA Film Festival)
- Running time: 93 minutes
- Country: United States
- Language: English

Girl Flu. is a 2016 American comedy film written and directed by Dorie Barton and starring Katee Sackhoff, Jade Pettyjohn, Jeremy Sisto, Judy Reyes and Heather Matarazzo.

== Plot ==
12-year-old Bird has moved with her single mom Jenny from a San Fernando Valley suburb to a neighborhood in Echo Park. Compounding this transition is the arrival of Bird's first period, which makes itself embarrassingly known at a school picnic. Bird and her free-spirited, impulsive mom both learn about what it means to become a woman.

== Cast ==
- Katee Sackhoff as Jenny
- Jade Pettyjohn as Robin/Bird
- Jeremy Sisto as Arlo
- Heather Matarazzo as Lilli
- Judy Reyes as Celeste
- Diego Josef as Carlos
- Isabella Acres as Rachel

== Reception ==
The film has an 86% rating on Rotten Tomatoes. Kate Erbland of IndieWire graded the film a B, writing "Although Bird’s issues are myriad and it would be easy for her to fall into a pattern of pitying herself, her unique mix of pluck and practicality make the character shine and keep the tone of 'Girl Flu' fizzy and light."

Jon Frosch of The Hollywood Reporter gave the film a positive review, calling it "warm and winning" and "a slight but distinctive coming-of-ager."

Bob Strauss of the Los Angeles Daily News also gave the film a positive review and wrote, "Girl Flu. is everything indie comedy should be and rarely is: fearless, committed to character and willing to not only get dirty but to stay that way."
