= Jack of the Red Hearts =

2015 independent drama film by Janet Grillo

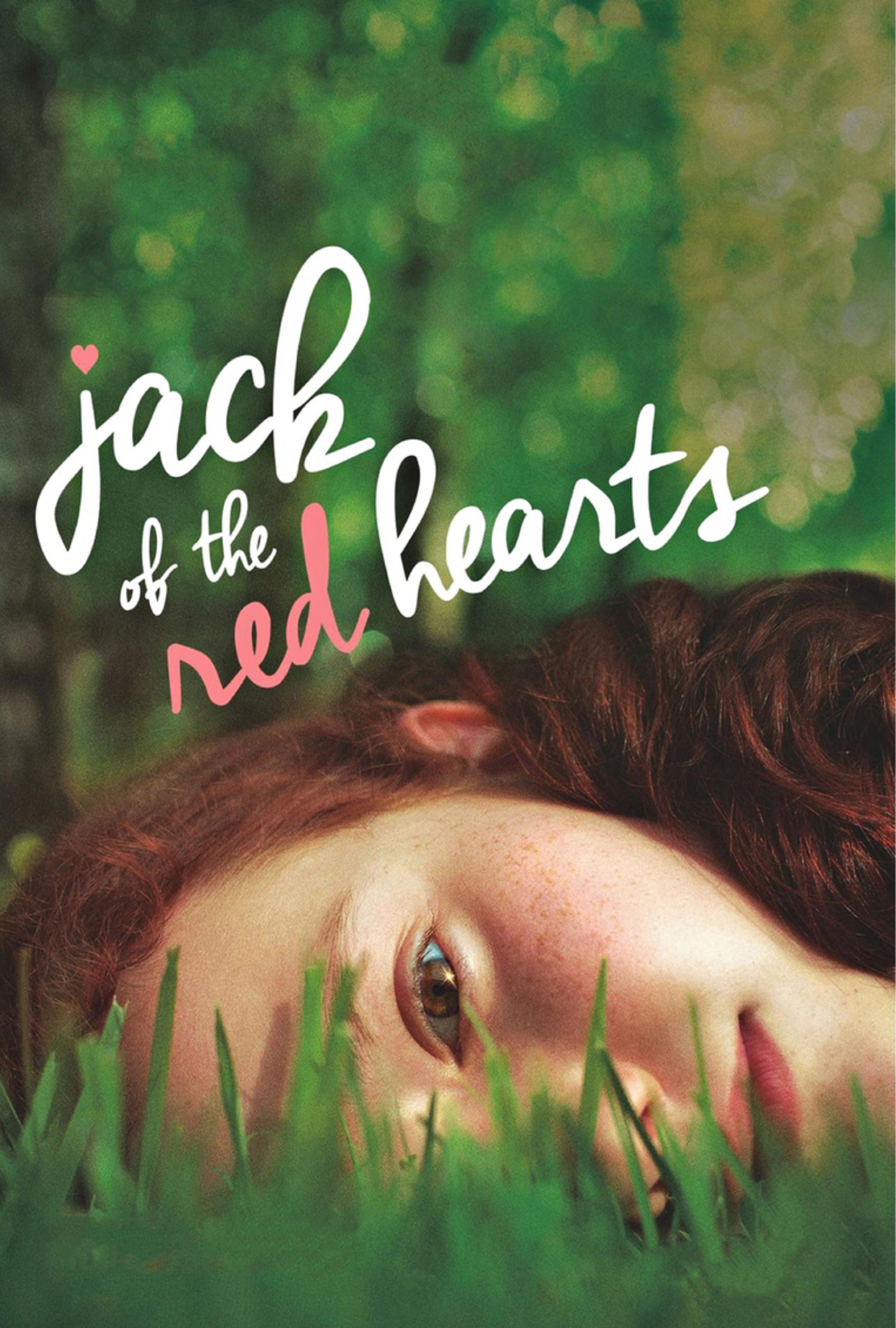
- Promotional release poster
- Directed by: Janet Grillo
- Written by: Jennifer Deaton
- Produced by: Joey Carey; Lucy Mukerjee-Brown; Stefan Nowicki; Morgan White
- Starring: AnnaSophia Robb; Famke Janssen; Scott Cohen; Israel Broussard
- Cinematography: Hillary Spera
- Edited by: Jim Curtis Mol
- Music by: Danny Bensi; Saunder Jurriaans
- Production company: Sundial Pictures
- Distributed by: ARC Entertainment; Alchemy
- Release dates: May 6, 2015 (BFF); February 26, 2016 (WW)
- Running time: 102 minutes
- Country: United States
- Language: English
- Box office: $31,126

Jack of the Red Hearts is a 2015 American film directed by Janet Grillo and centered on the issues of orphanage, family, autism, exclusion and inclusion. The film premiered on May 6, 2015, at the Bentonville Film Festival and released theatrically on February 26, 2016.

== Plot ==
18-year-old Jack struggles to take care of her younger sister, Coke, as both are orphans. When Coke is taken into social assistance services, Jack is required to find a stable income in order to gain legal custody of her sister. After taking the resume of an actual therapist, Donna and assuming her identity, Jack is hired by Kay and Mark to care for their daughter, a young autistic girl named Glory, who is about Coke's age. While Jack finds her job challenging at first, she eventually improves and creates a positive connection with Glory. After the forgery is discovered by Robert (Israel Broussard), Jack realizes her wrongdoing. She helps the family and gets Glory admission to a school. She goes to meet her sister and tell her that she should stay in the foster home. The family then forgives her and promises to do anything they can for Jack. At the end of the movie, we can see Jack as she contemplates the sky the same way as Glory, while being driven in a police car.

== Cast ==
- AnnaSophia Robb as Jacqueline "Jack" Ferguson, an eighteen-year-old runaway
- Famke Janssen as Kay Adams, Robert and Glory's mother
- Scott Cohen as Mark Adams, Robert and Glory's father
- Israel Broussard as Robert Adams, Glory's seventeen-year-old brother and Jack's love interest
- Taylor Richardson as Glory Adams, an eleven-year-old autistic girl
- Sophia Anne Caruso as Bethany "Coke" Ferguson, Jack's eleven-year-old sister
- Maria Rivera as Daisy, Jack's best friend
- John D'Leo as Dudley, Robert's best friend
- Omar Maskati as Junior

== Reception ==
Jack of the Red Hearts has grossed a total worldwide of $31,126. On review aggregator website Rotten Tomatoes, the film holds an approval rating of 55% based on 11 reviews, and an average rating of 5.9/10. On Metacritic, the film has a weighted average score of 55 out of 100, based on 5 critics, indicating "mixed or average reviews". The film won the jury award for best film at the first Bentonville Film Festival in 2015, the Audience Award for the Best Narrative Feature, the Jury Award for the Best Feature Narrative and the Director Prize for Best Young Actress (for Taylor Richardson's performance as a severely autistic child) at Woods Hole Film Festival 2015, and The Chimaera Project Award at the Catalina Film Festival 2015.
