= 18 to Party =

- Directed by: Jeffrey Roda
- Written by: Jeffrey Roda
- Produced by: Andrew Cahill; Nikola Duravcevic; Emily Ziff Griffin; Stephanie Marin
- Edited by: Kate Williams
- Music by: Dylan Neely
- Release date: October 4, 2019 (Woodstock Film Festival)
- Running time: 80 minutes
- Country: United States
- Language: English

18 to Party is a 2019 American comedy film written and directed by Jeff Roda. The film premiered at the Woodstock Film Festival on October 4, 2019. Following its premiere, the film was also screened at the Big Apple Film Festival on November 21, 2019 and at the Florida Film Festival on August 11, 2020, where it won the Special Jury Prize for Ensemble Cast. The official trailer for the film was released on September 25, 2020, and featured Taylor Richardson and Sam McCarthy among others.

== Plot ==
It is 1984. A group of teenagers spend the day waiting to get into a nightclub. Meanwhile, school is approaching and a group of eighth graders are forced to go back to their studies. The group includes nerdy Shel, his crush Amy, music fan Missy, bickering Peter and Dean, burly Brad, smart-ass Kira, and Lanky, who has been released from youth detention center and has been considering going back to school. While they wait outside for a nightclub to open, the teens raise hot topics that range from UFO sightings to music, and from Lanky's release to what's in store when school is back in session. While discussing those topics, they realize some crazy truths about each other.

== Cast ==
- Kevin Daniel Carey as party goer
- Enzo Cellucci as Rizzo
- Alivia Clark as Amy
- Ashling Doyle as Tonya
- Tanner Flood as Shel
- James Freedson-Jackson as Lanky
- Oliver Gifford as Brad
- Nolan Lyons as Dean
- Sam McCarthy as Peter
- Taylor Richardson as Missy
- Erich Schuett as James
- Ivy Miller as Kira

== Reception ==
On review aggregator website Rotten Tomatoes, the film has a 60% approval rating based on 15 reviews, with an average ranking of 6/10.

In August, 2021 critic WorldFilmGeek listed 18 To Party in their Top Ten Teen Movies of all-time at #9.

Nick Allen of RogerEbert.com wrote "18 to Party nudges that there's got to be something more to a story concerning youth like this, that it can't feel so limited to what they see and chat about".

Film Threat's Chris Salce said "18 to Party knows what it's going to be, and it does it well".

According to Selome Hailu of The Austin Chronicle, "[The film] need[s] more scrupulous eyes, but bears the palpable excitement of a new voice. It's worth the watch for indie lovers and coming-of-age aficionados, with just enough moments of true clarity to expect a more mature, balanced appeal in Roda's future".
