= Sticks (film) =

2001 film by Brett Mayer

- Movie Poster
- Directed by: Brett Mayer
- Screenplay by: Nils Erickson
- Produced by: Cindy Clark; Darren Paskal; Larry Roth; Dermot Begley
- Starring: Lillo Brancato; Justina Machado; Keith Brunsmann; ChrisAnn Brunsmann; Leo Rossi; Rebecca Grant; David Kriegel; David Bel Ayche
- Cinematography: Nils Erickson
- Edited by: Mark Goldman
- Music by: Bill Elliott
- Production company: Clark Cinema
- Release date: March 3, 2001 (North America)
- Running time: 92 minutes
- Country: United States
- Language: English

Sticks is a 2001 American action comedy film directed by Brett Mayer and starring Lillo Brancato, Justina Machado, and Keith Brunsmann.

== Plot ==
Sticks is an off-beat noir action comedy about a smuggler of Cuban cigars who gets involved, and ultimately falls in love, with a Cuban revolutionary Maria who's in the U.S. trading cigars for guns. The two join forces to sell a large (stolen) shipment of Castro's private label cigar, the famed "El Mariposa", and suddenly they find themselves enmeshed in the seedy underbelly of a mob-run cigar smuggling ring that's being monitored by the feds.
