= Forgive Me, Leonard Peacock =

Book by Matthew Quick

First edition (publ. Little, Brown)

Forgive Me, Leonard Peacock is a novel written by Matthew Quick about a 17-year-old high school senior named Leonard Peacock who plans to shoot Asher Beal, his former best friend, and then subsequently kill himself, on his birthday.

== Film adaptation ==
In October 2017, Channing Tatum announced that plans for a movie adaptation, upon which he had been working in association with the Weinstein Company, were no longer to continue in the wake of allegations of sexual assaults by Harvey Weinstein. The movie was to have been Tatum's directorial debut.
