= Janet Grillo =

American film director

- Born: New Jersey, U.S.
- Occupation: Filmmaker
- Known for: Fly Away
- Spouse: David O. Russell (m. 1992; div. 2007)
- Children: 1

Janet Grillo is an American filmmaker.

== Early life and education ==
Grillo grew up in New Jersey and moved to New York City upon graduating college. She graduated magna cum laude with honors in theatre from Wesleyan University and later received an MFA from Tisch School of the Arts Dramatic Writing Program. She is currently an Associate Arts Professor at New York University Tisch School of the Arts in the Undergraduate Program at the Kanbar Institute for Film and Television and lives full-time in New York City.

== Career ==
Grillo began her career as an assistant literary manager at Circle Repertory Company, under co-founder Marshall Mason, where she was a member of the emerging writer/director/actor Lab. She then worked at New Line Cinema in the New York office for 10 years, rising through the ranks from freelance script reader, becoming the studio's first Story Editor and first Director of Acquisitions, establishing both departments, to eventually become the Sr. VP of Production/East Coast, under the President of Productions, Sara Risher and President/Founder Bob Shaye.

During her tenure at New Line, she launched the House Party franchise and the careers of filmmakers Reggie Hudlin, Ted Demme, and David O. Russell, whom Grillo married in 1992. She also executive produced Sundance Film Festival award-winning films Spanking the Monkey and Hangin' with the Homeboys. As an independent producer, Grillo executive produced Joe the King, and produced Searching for Paradise, which was developed at the Sundance Labs and aired on the Sundance Channel. She received an Emmy Award as executive producer of HBO's documentary Autism: The Musical.

=== Fly Away ===
In 2011, Grillo wrote, directed and produced the ultra-low-budget feature Fly Away starring Ashley Rickards of MTV's Awkward. The film premiered in dramatic competition at SXSW in 2011, won Jury Prize for Best Performance at Arizona International Film Festival and was nominated for a Voice Award for its depiction of mental illness. Fly Away opened in limited release to critical acclaim from The New York Times, Los Angeles Times, HuffPost, New York Observer, Variety, and The Hollywood Reporter. Critic Rex Reed of the New York Observer said it deserved an Academy Award nomination, and Los Angeles Times Calendar Section sited it as one of the four indie film performances most overlooked for Oscar nomination that year.

=== Jack of the Red Hearts ===
Grillo directed and executive produced Jack of the Red Hearts, a narrative feature starring Famke Janssen and AnnaSophia Robb. It won the Jury Prize at the inaugural Bentonville Film Festival, which was co-founded by actress/activist Geena Davis to advance women and diversity. The film also won the Audience Award for the Best Narrative Feature, the Jury Award for the Best Feature Narrative and the Director Prize for Best Young Actress (for Taylor Richardson's performance as a severely autistic child) at Woods Hole Film Festival 2015, and The Chimaera Project Award at the Catalina Film Festival 2015.

In 2022, Janet directed the independent narrative sci-fi comedy, Alien Intervention. Originally titled The Warm Season, the film won Festival Director’s Award at the Boston Sci Fi Film Festival and Best Cinematography Award at the Santa Fe Film Festival. It was programmed in several festivals including Woodstock Film Festival and Arizona Film Festival. It is distributed on streaming platforms.

== Personal life ==
From 1992 to 2007, she was married to director David O. Russell, with whom she has one son.
