= The Good Luck of Right Now =

2014 book by Matthew Quick

- First edition (US)
- Author: Matthew Quick
- Genre: Literary Fiction
- Publisher: HarperCollins
- Publication date: 2014
- ISBN: 978-0-06-228553-9

The Good Luck of Right Now is a novel written by Matthew Quick.

== Film adaptation ==
On January 15, 2014, it was announced that after the success of The Silver Linings Playbook adaptation, the upcoming novel would be adapting into the feature film. On January 17, DreamWorks acquired the rights to the film. On January 29, Brie Larson was in talks to join the film for a lead cast. On March 20, studio tapped Mike White to write the script for the film. On May 27, directors Jonathan Dayton and Valerie Faris left the film project due to creative disagreements.
