= The Throwback (2023 film) =

2023 comedy film by Mario Garcia

- Film poster
- Directed by: Mario Garcia
- Written by: Mario Garcia
- Produced by: Michael A. Alfieri; Doug Fox; Mario Garcia
- Starring: Justina Machado; Will Sasso; Gregg Sulkin; Michelle Randolph; Bobby Lee
- Cinematography: Niav Conty
- Edited by: Sophie Dick
- Music by: Dylan Glatthorn
- Production companies: Miantri Films; Movie House Stories
- Distributed by: Myriad Pictures
- Release dates: May 3, 2023 (Tampa Theatre); March 15, 2024 (United States)
- Country: United States
- Language: English

The Throwback is a 2023 American comedy film written and directed by Mario Garcia in his directorial debut. The film stars Justina Machado as a mother who is suffering from post-traumatic stress disorder, causing her to regress to her college-student, party-going persona, but who eventually learns the party life will never replace the love for her family. The film also stars Will Sasso, Gregg Sulkin, Michelle Randolph and Bobby Lee. It initially screened at the Tampa Theatre on May 3, 2023, and was released by Myriad Pictures on March 15, 2024.

== Cast ==
- Justina Machado as Kate
- Will Sasso as Matt
- Gregg Sulkin as Rick
- Michelle Randolph as Shea
- Bobby Lee as Charles
- Rhonda Shear as Teri
- Greg Pitts as Dr. Lawrence

== Production ==
In April 2022, it was reported that Justina Machado and Will Sasso will star in the independent comedy film The Throwback, the feature directorial debut of Mario Garcia. Gregg Sulkin, Michelle Randolph and Bobby Lee joined the cast in main roles in May.

Principal photography took place in Tampa, Florida in May 2022.

== Release ==
The Throwback had a first-look community screening at the Tampa Theatre on May 3, 2023. It was released by Myriad Pictures on March 15, 2024.
