= Greg Pitts =

American actor (born 1970)

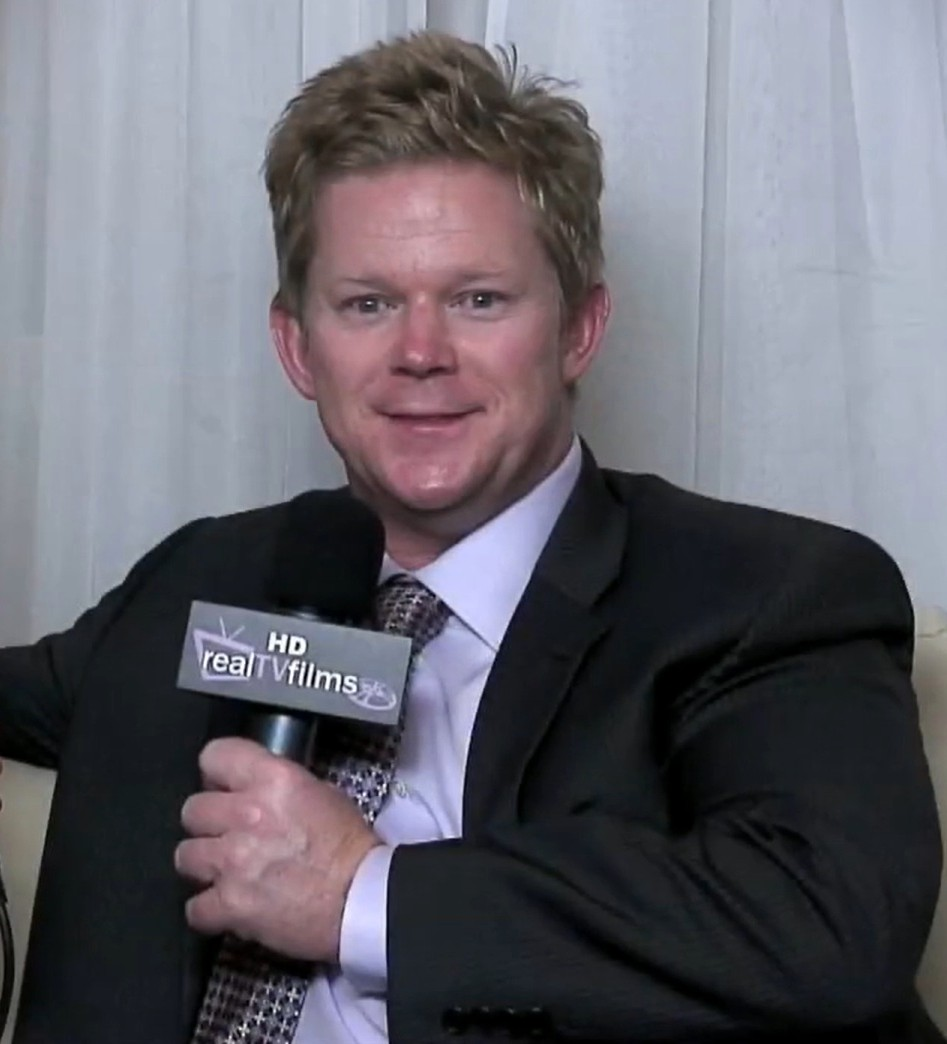
- Pitts in 2009
- Born: Greg Eugene Pitts; January 21, 1970 (age 56); Sarasota, Florida, U.S.
- Occupation: Actor
- Years active: 1998–present

Greg Eugene Pitts (born January 21, 1970) is an American actor best known for his role as Drew in the film Office Space.

== Career ==
He has taken roles in films and television series, including Grey's Anatomy and Sons & Daughters, and has been featured as "Vincent" in Allstate Insurance advertisements, alongside his sidekick, Andrew Hawtrey, who played as "Bergwood".

Pitts graduated from the University of South Florida in 1992 with a degree in Theatre. He was a member of Pi Kappa Alpha fraternity at the University of South Florida.

== Filmography ==
=== Feature films ===
Year	Film	Role
1999	Office Space	Drew
2000	Panic	Alex - Age 20
2000	Beethoven's 3rd	Quentin/Video Store Clerk
2000	Coyote Ugly	Fiji Mermaid Waiter
2001	I Shaved My Legs for This	Video Guy
2001	Speaking of Sex	Deputy Trousdale
2002	The Third Wheel	Tee
2002	Unconditional Love	Officer Jones
2006	Bickford Shmeckler's Cool Ideas	Doug the Dungeon Master
2006	Idiocracy	Cameraman
2008	The Onion Movie	Wizards Dragonmaster
2008	Bachelor Party 2: The Last Temptation	Jason
2015	Alvin and the Chipmunks: The Road Chip	Pool Attendant
2023	The Throwback	Dr. Lawrence

=== Television ===
Year	Title	Role	Notes
1998	Damon	Billy McCarthy	7 episodes
1998	Sister, Sister	Chud McGraf	4 episodes
1999	Kilroy	Brad	TV movie
1999	Suddenly Susan	Chuck	1 episode
1999	Chicken Soup for the Soul	McNeely	1 episode
1999	Witness Protection	Duffy	TV movie
2000	Normal, Ohio	Charles 'Charlie' Gamble	7 episodes
2004	Eve	Mark	1 episode
2005	CSI: Crime Scene Investigation	Valet	1 episode
2005	Grey's Anatomy	Jerry O'Malley	2005–2007, 5 episodes
2006	Sons & Daughters	Tommy 'Whitey' White	2006–2007, 10 episodes
2007	The Sarah Silverman Program	Greg Pitts (O Face Guy)	1 episode
2007	Slacker Cats	Dan	1 episode
2008	Moonlight	Grant Lewis	1 episode
2008	Monk	Billy Logan	1 episode
2008	Weeds	Billy Boesky	2 episodes
2009	The New 20's	Lloyd	TV short, producer, 1 episode
2009	Maneater	Aaron Mason	TV miniseries, 2 episodes
2010	Bones	Lucas Pickford	1 episode
2011	Melissa & Joey	Jamie	1 episode
2011	Last Man Standing	Pete	2 episodes
2012	Burn Notice	Warrick	1 episode
2013	The New Normal	Pat	1 episode
2018	American Crime Story	Middle Aged Man	1 episode
2019	Modern Family	Rusty	1 episode
2019	The Detour	Claude	2 episodes
2020	The Resident	Doug Corson	2 episodes
2023	Young Sheldon	Bruce	1 episode

=== Shorts ===
Year	Title	Role
1999	Studio Notes	Vincent van Gogh
2001	Rebound Guy	Keith
2008	The Dark	Teddy
2010	Love Is Retarded	Ruben
