= The Marshmallow Experiment =

Upcoming film by Richard Goldgewicht

- Teaser poster
- Directed by: Richard Goldgewicht
- Written by: Richard Goldgewicht; Matt Hamilton; Abe Frank
- Produced by: Jayce Barreiro; Graem Luis; Dafne Keen; Richard Goldgewicht; Ruth Bornhauser
- Starring: Sam McCarthy; Dafne Keen; Steve Buscemi; Johnny Knoxville; Josh Lucas; Sarah Chalke
- Cinematography: Mahlon Todd Williams
- Edited by: Shawn Paper
- Music by: Emanuele Arnone
- Production companies: Affinity Core Story Productions; Big Picture Cinema Group
- Countries: United States; Canada
- Language: English

The Marshmallow Experiment is an upcoming coming-of-age sex comedy film directed by Richard Goldgewicht. Matt Hamilton and Abe Frank co-wrote as well. It stars Sam McCarthy, Dafne Keen, Steve Buscemi, Johnny Knoxville, Josh Lucas, and Sarah Chalke.

== Premise ==
The story follows Alex, a socially awkward teen whose efforts to survive high school are complicated by an insatiable addiction to online porn.

== Cast ==
- Sam McCarthy as Alex, a sexually frustrated teenager who unplugs from the internet after a disastrous sexual encounter
- Dafne Keen as Kat Garcia
- Steve Buscemi as King Dong
- Johnny Knoxville as Will
- Josh Lucas as Dr. Newman
- Sarah Chalke as Colleen

== Production ==
In April 2025, it was announced that a coming-of-age sex comedy film written and directed by Richard Goldgewicht, Matt Hamilton, and Abe Frank was in development, with Sam McCarthy, Dafne Keen, Steve Buscemi, Johnny Knoxville, Josh Lucas, and Sarah Chalke joining the cast. Principal photography began on April 28, 2025, in Vancouver, and wrapped on May 22.
