= Matthew Quick =

American author

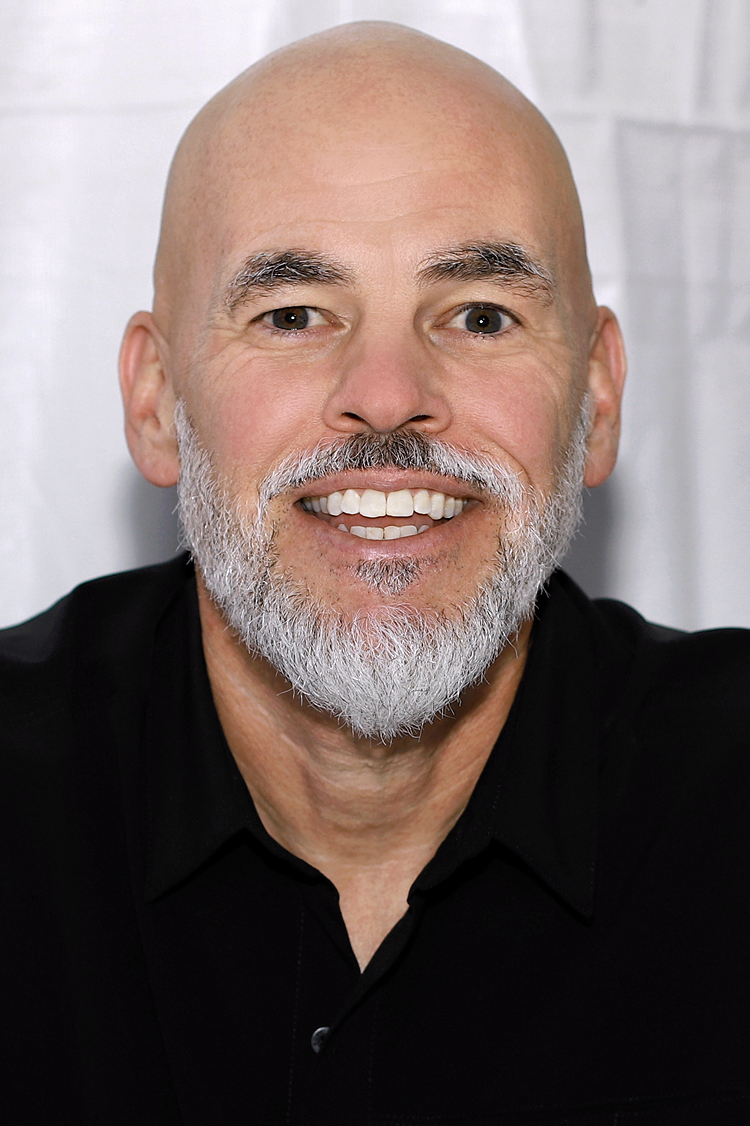
- Quick at the 2022 Texas Book Festival.
- Born: October 23, 1973 (age 52); Camden, New Jersey, U.S.
- Education: La Salle University, Goddard College, Collingswood High School
- Occupation: Writer
- Spouse: Alicia Bessette
- Writing career
- Genres: Adult novels, Young-adult novels
- Notable work: The Silver Linings Playbook
- Website: matthewquickwriter.com

Matthew Quick (born October 23, 1973) is an American writer of adult and young adult fiction. His 2008 debut novel, The Silver Linings Playbook, became a New York Times bestseller and was adapted as a 2012 movie of the same name starring Bradley Cooper and Jennifer Lawrence.

Quick was a finalist for a 2009 PEN/Hemingway Award, and his work has been translated into several languages. In 2012, his young-adult novel, Boy 21, was reviewed favorably by The New York Times.

Quick was a finalist for the TIME 100 most influential people of 2013.

== Personal life ==
Quick grew up in Oaklyn, New Jersey, and graduated from Collingswood High School. In his memoir, Dad, Love, Me; he describes a volatile relationship with his father. He has a degree in English literature and secondary education from La Salle University and an MFA from Goddard College. Quick taught high school literature in southern New Jersey for several years before leaving his job as a tenured English teacher in Haddonfield, New Jersey, to write his first novel. Quick lived in Massachusetts for several years; he and his wife, novelist and pianist Alicia Bessette, later moved to the Outer Banks of North Carolina, and now live in Beaufort, South Carolina. He received an Honorary Doctorate of Humane Letters from La Salle in 2013.

== Works ==
Source: Fiction Database

- The Silver Linings Playbook (2008) ISBN 9781447291480, OCLC 910977730
- Sorta Like a Rockstar (2010) – YA ISBN 9781472212825, OCLC 858312107
- Boy21 (2012) – YA ISBN 9781472212900, OCLC 885301812
- Forgive Me, Leonard Peacock (2013) – YA
- The Good Luck of Right Now (2014)
- Love May Fail (2015) ISBN 9780062420152, OCLC 906023510
- Every Exquisite Thing (2016) – YA
- The Reason You're Alive (2017)
- We Are the Light (2022) ISBN 9781668005422
- Dad, Love, Me (2026) - Memoir

== Film adaptations ==
- Silver Linings Playbook (2012)
- All Together Now (2020)
