= Sam McCarthy (actor) =

American actor (born 2002)

- Born: March 15, 2002 (age 24); New York City, U.S.
- Occupation: Actor
- Years active: 2016–present
- Parents: Andrew McCarthy (father); Carol Schneider (mother)

Sam McCarthy (born March 15, 2002) is an American actor. He is known for his roles as Sam Barber Jr. in the Audience drama series Condor (2018) and Charlie Harding in the Netflix dark comedy series Dead to Me (2019–22). He made his film debut in All These Small Moments (2018).

== Early life ==
McCarthy was born on March 15, 2002, to Carol Schneider and actor Andrew McCarthy. McCarthy attended and graduated high school at The Professional Children's School in New York in 2020.

== Career ==
In 2016, McCarthy made his professional acting debut in the ABC drama series The Family. Following on from his first role, McCarthy went on to appear in a variety of television series, including the comedy series The Jim Gaffigan Show, the crime thriller series The Blacklist, and the drama series Condor.

McCarthy made his feature film debut in the coming-of-age drama film All These Small Moments, which premiered at the Tribeca Film Festival in April 2018.

On October 4, 2018, it was announced that McCarthy would star in the main role of Charlie Harding on the Netflix dark comedy series Dead to Me.

== Filmography ==
=== Film ===
Year	Title	Role	Notes
2018	All These Small Moments	Simon Shefield	
2019	18 to Party	Peter	
TBA	The Marshmallow Experiment	Alex	Post-production

=== Television ===
Year	Title	Role	Notes
2016	The Family	Young Hank	Episode: "I Win"
2016	The Blacklist	Student	Episode: "Dr. Adrian Shaw"
2016	The Jim Gaffigan Show	Mike Jr.	2 episodes
2018	The Blacklist	Alex Gillette	Episode: "The Invisible Hand"
2018–2020	Condor	Sam Barber Jr.	Recurring role; 12 episodes
2019–2022	Dead to Me	Charlie Harding	Main role; 30 episodes
2025	Goosebumps: The Vanishing	Devin	Main role; 8 episodes
