= Justina Machado =

American actress

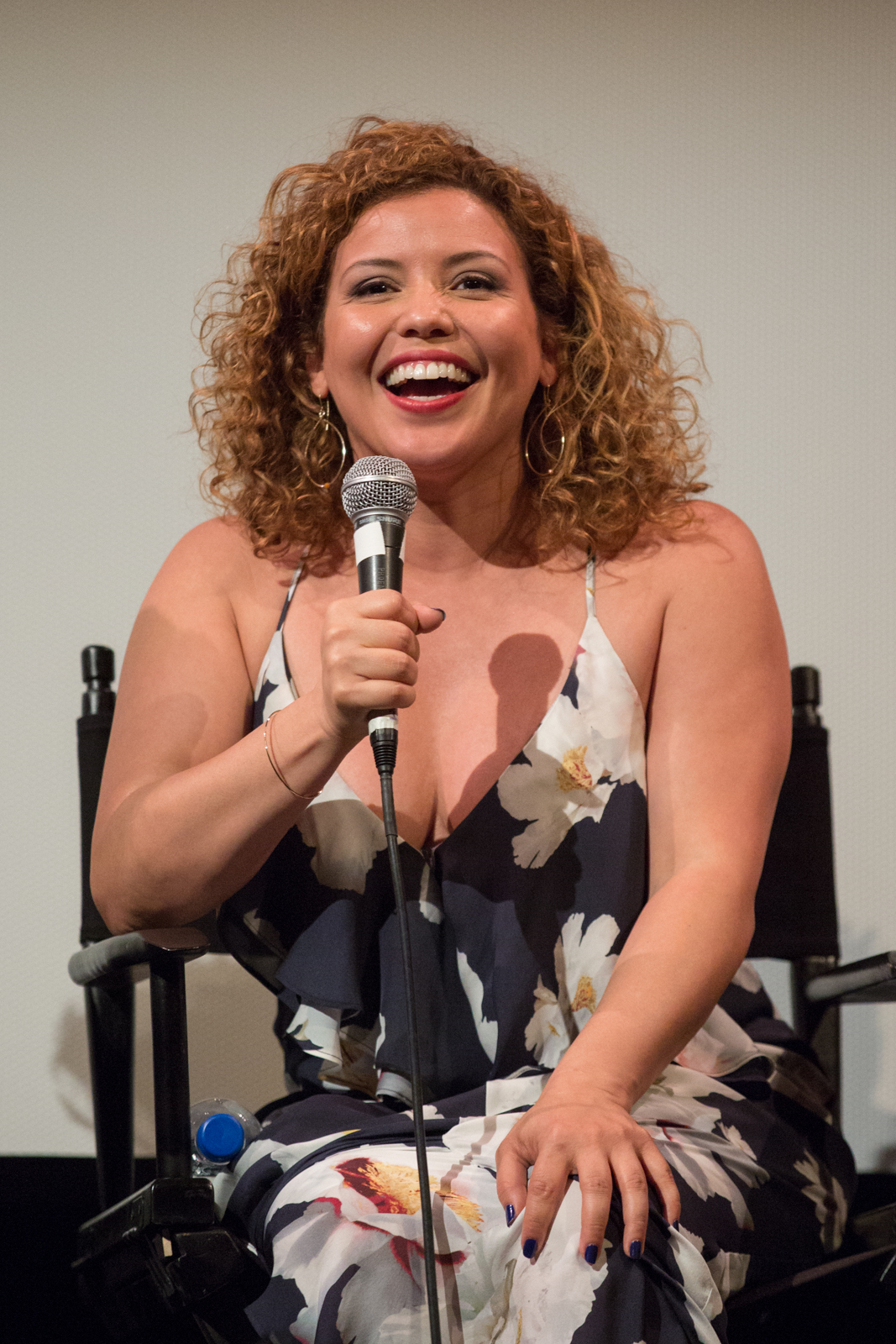
- Machado in 2016
- Born: Justina Milagros Machado; September 6, 1972 (age 54); Chicago, Illinois, U.S.
- Occupation: Actress
- Years active: 1993–present

Justina Milagros Machado (born September 6, 1972) is an American actress. She began her career playing secondary roles on television and film before starring as Vanessa Diaz in the HBO comedy-drama series, Six Feet Under (2001–05), for which she received Screen Actors Guild Award for Outstanding Performance by an Ensemble in a Drama Series. Machado later starred in the short-lived series Missing, Three Rivers and Welcome to the Family and was a regular cast member in the first season of the USA Network crime drama Queen of the South.

From 2017 to 2020, Machado starred as Penelope Alvarez in the Netflix/Pop TV comedy series, One Day at a Time, for which she received positive reviews from critics and two Imagen Awards for Best Actress - Television, and well as nomination for Critics' Choice Television Award for Best Actress in a Comedy Series. She also has appeared in films Final Destination 2 (2003), Torque (2004), Little Fugitive (2006), The Call (2013), The Purge: Anarchy (2014), All Together Now (2020) and The Throwback (2024). In 2023, she played the leading role in the Amazon Prime Video black comedy-horror series, The Horror of Dolores Roach. In 2025 Machado appeared in the Broadway Musical Real Women Have Curves for which she received critical acclaim and was nominated for the Tony Award for Best Featured Actress in a Musical.

== Early life ==
Machado was born in Chicago, Illinois, one of two children of Alicia Morales Ruiz and Ismael Machado. Her mother was born in Puerto Rico and her father was born to Puerto Rican parents. They subsequently divorced and her mother remarried and had three children. Her family roots are in Barceloneta, Puerto Rico, and Barrio Jagual, Patillas, Puerto Rico, and her ancestry includes Afro-Latino. As Machado is of Hispanic descent, she had a traditional quinceañera, with chambelanes as well as damas. She said her family was poor, and she grew up in the Northwest Side of Chicago. Machado was raised Catholic.

Machado was very active in drama, always participating in her school plays. She also took dance at Franklin Fine Arts Center. In 1986, Machado attended Lane Technical College Prep High School. During her spare time, she performed with the Latino Chicago Theater Company.

Machado was a guest appearing in Episode 6 of Season 6 of Finding Your Roots, a documentary show by PBS that is hosted by Dr. Henry Louis Gates Jr., during which it was confirmed that she has African matrilineal ancestry (i.e. through a female ancestor on her mother's side) through genetic testing of her mitochondrial DNA.

== Career ==
=== 1993–2015: Career beginnings ===
In 1990, after graduating from Lane Tech, Machado moved to New York City. The experience she had gained as a performer with the Latino Chicago Theater Company helped open the doors for her in that city. Soon, she was offered a job as a professional actress in Los Angeles. After relocating, she landed her first two acting roles in 1996. She was cast as Elsa in the ABC series NYPD Blue appearing in the episode "Burnin' Love", and co-starring in the made-for-television drama film No One Would Tell. In 1997, she made her big screen debut playing supporting role of Carmen Rodriguez in the romantic drama film She's So Lovely. Machado also guest-starred on Arsenio, Any Day Now, Touched by an Angel, Early Edition, Angel and had a recurring role on the short-lived UPN sitcom Goode Behavior.

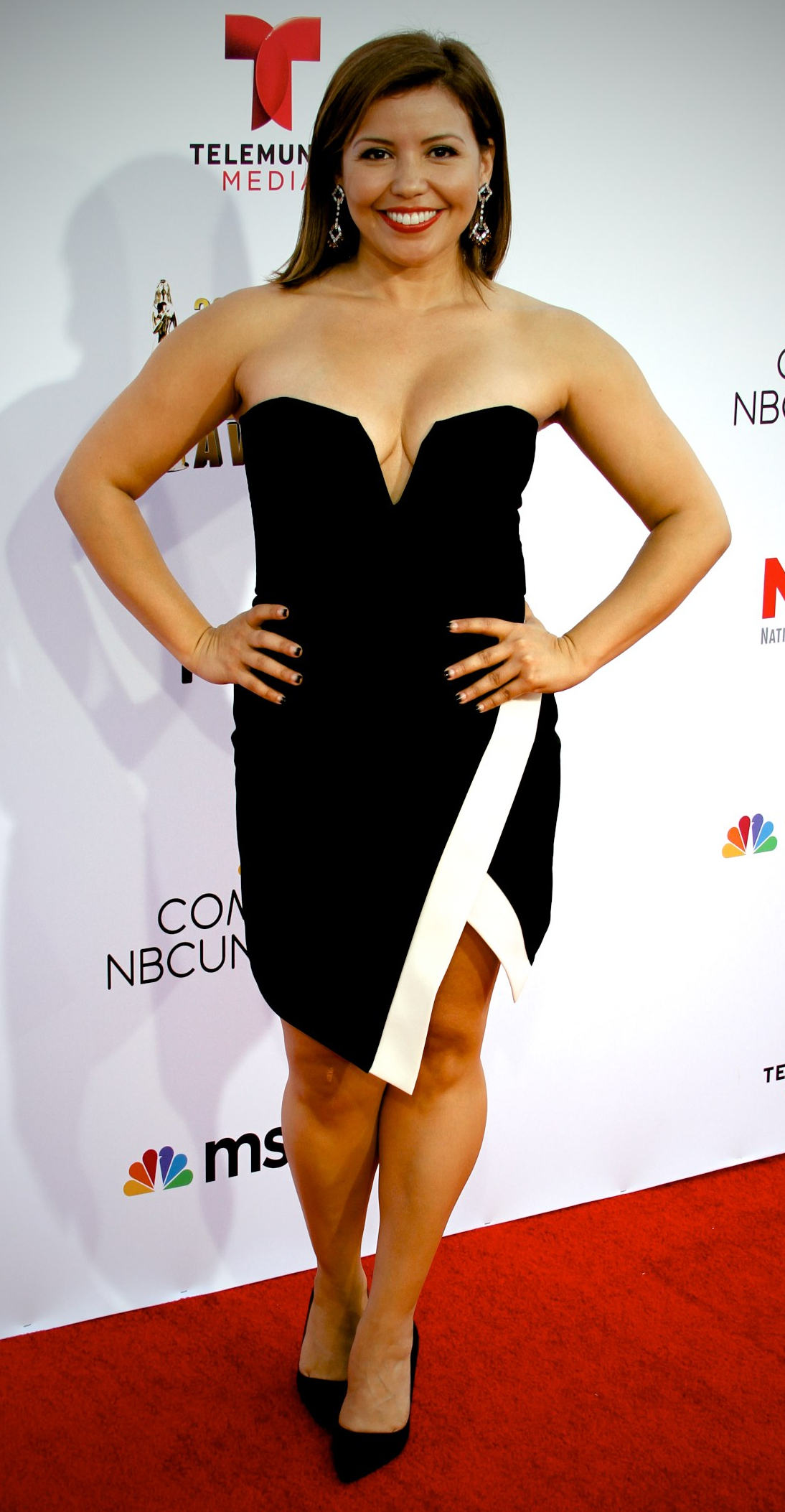
Machado at the 2014 ALMA Awards

In 2001, Machado played the leading role in the action comedy film Sticks and a minor part in Steven Spielberg's science fiction film A.I. Artificial Intelligence. Later that year, she was cast in the HBO comedy-drama series, Six Feet Under. She played Vanessa Diaz, originally a supporting character, later evolving into one of the series' main characters. Machado and her cast mates were honored with a Screen Actors Guild Award. The series completed its final season in 2005. In 2003, she played Isabella Hudson in the supernatural horror film, Final Destination 2, and the following year appeared in the action comedy Torque. In 2003, Machado appeared in the music video for TLC's song "Damaged", the third single from their fourth studio album 3D, as a young woman trapped in an abusive relationship and unsure of what to do with her life. From 2003 to 2004, Machado also starred in the Canadian crime drama series, 1-800-Missing playing FBI agent Sunny Estrada during the show first season. In 2006, she starred in the drama film Little Fugitive, a remake of the 1953 film of the same name. Machado has also made appearances on stage, including a 2008 production of Neil LaBute's play, Some Girl(s), at the Geffen Playhouse in Los Angeles. She was in productions of Blade to the Heat and Black Butterfly at the Mark Taper Forum in Los Angeles. She was the first replacement for Andréa Burns in Broadway's In the Heights. In 2010, Machado appeared in the Los Angeles run of Love, Loss and What I Wore.

Machado appeared in Grey's Anatomy, Ugly Betty, Bones, Body of Proof and Desperate Housewives. She had a recurring role as Chicago police officer Claudia Diaz in the NBC medical drama ER in 2009. From 2009 to 2010, she starred in the short-lived CBS medical drama series, Three Rivers. She later had recurring roles on Private Practice, The Fosters, and Devious Maids. In 2013, she starred alongside Ricardo Antonio Chavira in the short-lived NBC sitcom, Welcome to the Family. She also appeared in films The Call (2013), The Purge: Anarchy (2014), and Endgame.

=== 2016–present: Breakthrough and leading roles ===
In 2016, Machado starred as Brenda Parra during the first season of USA Network crime drama series, Queen of the South. She later guest-starred on the show' fourth season. Later that year, she joined the cast of The CW comedy series Jane the Virgin, playing the role of Darci Factor. In 2017, she was cast as a lead character in the Netflix comedy series, One Day at a Time based on the 1975 series of the same title. Machado has received positive reviews for her role as a single mother raising two children and struggling with PTSD after serving in Afghanistan. For her performance, she received two Imagen Awards for Best Actress - Television, and well as nomination for Critics' Choice Television Award for Best Actress in a Comedy Series. Despite positive critical reception, Machado has not received a Primetime Emmy Award nomination. The series ended in 2020 after four seasons.

In 2019, Machado played the leading role in the Lifetime television drama film Family Pictures. From 2019 to 2020, she had a recurring role on the NBC comedy series, Superstore playing new district manager Maya, with whom Amy Sosa shares a surprising connection. After having been announced to portray Florence Johnston in the first Live in Front of a Studio Audience's The Jeffersons portion, instead reprised by Marla Gibbs, Machado was cast in the second edition in December 2019 as Teresa Betancourt from All in the Family. On September 2, 2020, Machado was announced as one of the celebrities competing on the 29th season of Dancing with the Stars, partnered with professional dancer Sasha Farber. Machado finished in fourth place on November 23, 2020. In 2021, Machado was a singing bust in Muppets Haunted Mansion.

In 2020, Machado starred in the drama film All Together Now, which was released on Netflix. Also in 2020, Jacob Vargas and Machado were Masters of Ceremonies at the National Hispanic Media Coalition Impact Awards. In 2021, she starred in the Lifetime television drama film, Switched Before Birth directed by Elisabeth Röhm. She starred alongside Will Sasso in the comedy film, The Throwback.

In 2023, Machado starred as Dolores Roach in the Amazon Prime Video black comedy-horror series, The Horror of Dolores Roach. The series received generally positive reviews, with Machado's performance being widely praised. In 2024 she was cast in the Netflix medical drama series, Pulse as Dr. Natalie Cruz.

In 2025, Machado originated the role of Carmen Garcia in the Broadway musical production of Real Women Have Curves. She received a nomination for the Tony Award for Best Featured Actress in a Musical.

== Filmography ==
=== Film ===
Year	Title	Role	Notes
1997	She's So Lovely	Carmen Rodriguez	
1998	The Week That Girl Died	Marita	
1999	Swallows	America	
2000	Following Paula	Paula Ormida	Short film
2001	Sticks	Maria	
2001	A.I. Artificial Intelligence	Assistant	
2002	Dragonfly	Oncology Desk Nurse	
2002	Full Frontal	Linda's Friend in Kitchen	
2003	Final Destination 2	Isabella Hudson	
2004	Torque	FBI Agent Tehya Henderson	
2006	Little Fugitive	Natalia	
2007	I Think I Love My Wife	Paramedic	
2008	The Accidental Husband	Sofia	
2008	Breast Pump & Blender	Lizzie	Short film
2008	Man Maid	Terressa	
2008	Pedro	Mily	
2009	In the Electric Mist	Rosie Gomez	
2012	A Thousand Words	Caroline's Friend	
2013	The Call	Rachel	
2014	Endgame	Karla	
2014	The Purge: Anarchy	Tanya	
2020	Scoob!	Jamie Rivera	Voice
2020	All Together Now	Becky	
2021	Rita Moreno: Just a Girl Who Decided to Go for It	Herself	Documentary
2021	With/In: Volume 1		Segment: "Coco and Gigi"
2022	The Ice Age Adventures of Buck Wild	Zee	Voice
2023	The Throwback	Kate	
2026	Swapped	Calli	Voice

=== Television ===
Year	Title	Role	Notes
1993	ABC Afterschool Special		Episode: "Love Hurts"
1993	Missing Persons	Juanita Gonzales	Episode: "That's My Sister, Pal"
1996	NYPD Blue	Donna Mendoza	Episode: "Burnin' Love"
1996	Second Noah	Roxanna	Episode: "Second Noah"
1996	No One Would Tell	Val Cho	Television film
1997	ER	Ms. Cruz	Episode: "Ambush"
1997	Moloney		Episode: "I'm Ambivalent About L.A."
1997	Crisis Center	Raquel	Episode: "He Said, She Said"
1997	Arsenio	Anna Montez	Episode: "We Can Still Be Friends"
1997	Goode Behavior	Raquel DeLarosa	Recurring role (5 episodes)
1998	The Gregory Hines Show	Maria	Episode: "James Stevenson Stands Alone"
1998	Any Day Now	Olivia	Episode: "It's Who You Sleep With"
1998	Touched by an Angel	Marisol	Episode: "An Angel on the Roof"
1998	Malcolm & Eddie	Laura Morales	2 episodes
1999	Promised Land	Roxie Kahle	Episode: "Darkness Visible"
1999	Early Edition	Laura	Episode: "Camera Shy"
1999–2000	Oh Baby	Mona	3 episodes
2000	Angel	Jo	Episode: "Judgment"
2001–2005	Six Feet Under	Vanessa Diaz	Regular role (42 episodes); Screen Actors Guild Award for Outstanding Performance by an Ensemble in a Drama Series (2004); Nominated — Imagen Award for Best Supporting Actress - Television (2005–2006); Nominated — ALMA Award for Outstanding Supporting Actress in a Television Series (2006); Nominated — Screen Actors Guild Award for Outstanding Performance by an Ensemble in a Drama Series (2005–2006)
2002	The Johnny Chronicles	Marisol	TV pilot
2002	Strong Medicine		Episode: "Type & Cross"
2003–2004	Missing	Sunny Estrada	Main role (17 episodes)
2006	Ghost Whisperer	Suzanne	Episode: "Demon Child"
2006	Fatal Contact: Bird Flu in America	Alma Ansen	Television film
2006	Grey's Anatomy	Anna Nyles	Episode: "Oh, the Guilt"
2007	Cold Case	Amelia Lopez	Episode: "The Good Death"
2007	Ugly Betty	Cousin Clara	2 episodes
2008	Man of Your Dreams	Sheryl	TV pilot
2008	Kath & Kim	Angel	2 episodes
2009	ER	Claudia Diaz	Recurring role (8 episodes); Nominated — ALMA Award for Outstanding Actress in a Drama Series (2009)
2009–2010	Three Rivers	Pam Acosta	Main role (13 episodes)
2010	Burn Notice	Lauren	Episode: "Neighborhood Watch"
2010	Bones	Lupe Rojas	Episode: "The Couple in the Cave"
2011	Off the Map	Teresa	Episode: "Hold on Tight"
2011	The Protector	Marisol Casas	Episode: "Blood"
2011	Body of Proof	Emily Burrows	Episode: "Lazarus Man"
2011	Harry's Law	Counsel	Episode: "American Girl"
2012	Desperate Housewives	Claudia Sanchez	2 episodes
2012	Switched at Birth	Nurse Britzia Munoz	2 episodes
2012–2013	Private Practice	Stephanie Kemp	Recurring role (6 episodes)
2013	The Fosters	Sonia Rivera	3 episodes
2013	Welcome to the Family	Lisette Hernandez	2 episodes
2013	Murder Police	Rosa Sanchez (voice)	13 episodes
2014	Major Crimes	Ana Ruiz	Episode: "Acting Out"
2014	Finders Keepers	Prof. Elena Carranza	Television film
2015	Devious Maids	Reina	2 episodes
2016	Heartbeat	Beth / Emily	Episode: "Twins"
2016–2019	Jane the Virgin	Darci Factor	Recurring role, 19 episodes
2016, 2019	Queen of the South	Brenda	Main role (season 1); 13 episodes Guest role (season 4); 2 episodes
2016–2020	Elena of Avalor	Carmen (voice)	Recurring role; 9 episodes
2017–2020	One Day at a Time	Penelope Alvarez	Main role; 45 episodes + animated special; also producer (season 4); Imagen Award for Best Actress - Television (2017–2018); Imagen Award for Best Voice-Over Actor - Television (2019); Nominated - Critics' Choice Television Award for Best Actress in a Comedy Series (2019); Nominated - Online Film & Television Association Award for Best Actress in a Comedy Series (2017); Nominated - Imagen Award for Best Actress - Television (2019–2020)
2019	Family Pictures	Sylvie	Television film Nominated - Imagen Award for Best Actress - Television
2019–2020	Superstore	Maya Fonseca	2 episodes Voice role; 2 episodes
2020	Dancing with the Stars	Herself	Contestant on season 29
2020	Harley Quinn	Bethany (voice)	Episode: "A Fight Worth Fighting For"
2021	Muppets Haunted Mansion	Singing Bust	TV special
2021	Switched Before Birth	Anna Ramirez	Television film Nominated - Imagen Award for Best Actress - Drama (Television)
2021–2023	DreamWorks Dragons: The Nine Realms	Carla Gonzalez (voice)	10 episodes
2023	Lopez vs Lopez	Beatrice "Bunny" Perez	Episode: "Lopez vs Cheating"
2023	Law & Order	Defense Attorney Lauren Whitmer	Episode: "Class Retreat"
2023	The Horror of Dolores Roach	Dolores Roach	Lead role, 8 episodes
2025	Happy's Place	Maritza	Episode: "Mama Drama"
2025	Pulse	Natalie Cruz	Series regular
2025	Matlock	Eva Muñoz	recurring role. 5 episodes

=== Theatre (select) ===
Year	Title	Role	Playwright	Venue	Ref.
1993	Real Women Have Curves	Ana	Josefina Lopez	Victory Gardens Theater, Chicago	
2005	The Mambo Kings	Anna Maria	Various	Golden Gate Theatre, San Francisco	
2009	In the Heights	Daniela	Lin-Manuel Miranda; Quiara Alegría Hudes	Richard Rodgers Theatre, Broadway	
2010	A Free Man of Color	Doña Smeralda / Josephine	John Guare	Vivian Beaumont Theater, Broadway	
2023	Real Women Have Curves	Carmen Garcia	Various	American Repertory Theater, Cambridge	
2025	Real Women Have Curves	Carmen Garcia	Various	James Earl Jones Theatre, Broadway	

=== Video games ===
Year	Title	Role	Notes
2016	Gears of War 4	Reyna Diaz	
2019	Gears 5	Reyna Diaz	

== See also ==
- List of Puerto Ricans
- Puerto Ricans in Chicago
