= Arizona International Film Festival =

Independent film festival in Arizona, U.S.

- Location: Tucson, Arizona, U.S.
- Established: 1990
- Language: English
- Website: filmfestivalarizona.com

The Arizona International Film Festival is the oldest and longest running independent film festival in Arizona, United States. Taking place yearly, film programs include a mix of shorts, children's films, feature-length films, documentaries and animation films.

The festival is also a Film Festival Grant Recipient of The Academy of Motion Picture Arts and Sciences.
