= Greenwich Township, Gloucester County, New Jersey =

Township in Gloucester County, New Jersey, US

Greenwich Township, New Jersey
- Township
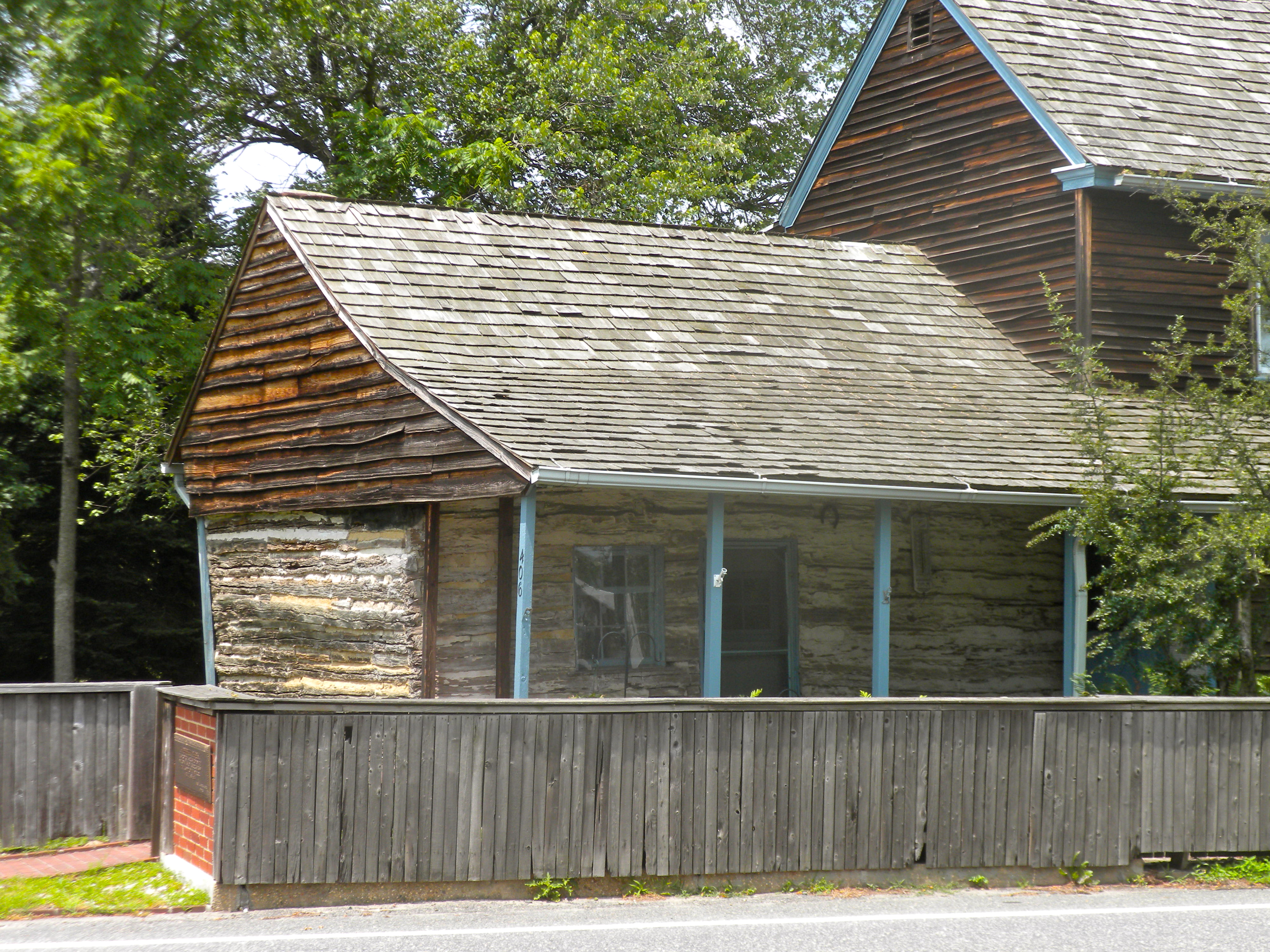
- C. A. Nothnagle Log House in Greenwich Township, New Jersey

- Seal
- Motto: "Home of the Historic Nothnagle Log Cabin!"
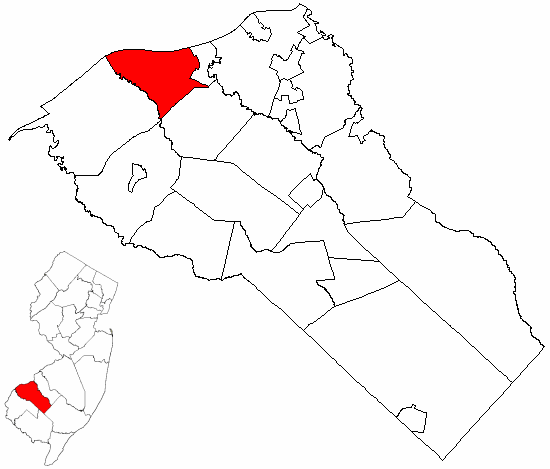
- Location of Greenwich Township in Gloucester County highlighted in red (right). Inset map: Location of Gloucester County in New Jersey highlighted in red (left).

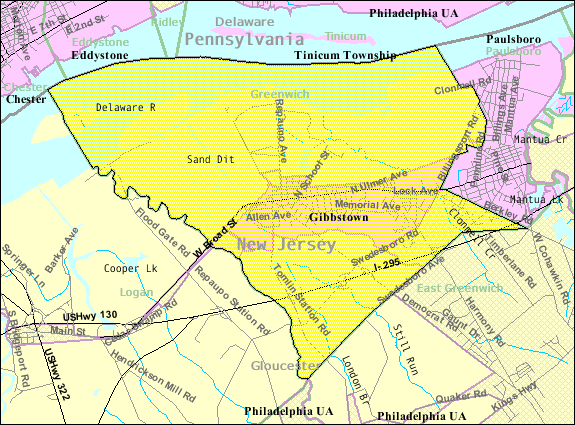
- Census Bureau map of Greenwich Township, Gloucester County, New Jersey

- Location in Gloucester County Location in New Jersey Location in the United States
- Coordinates: 39.83473°N 75.288482°W
- Country: United States
- State: New Jersey
- County: Gloucester
- Formed: March 1, 1695
- Incorporated: February 21, 1798
- Named for: Greenwich, England

Government
  - Type: Faulkner Act (mayor–council)
  - Body: Township Council
  - Mayor: Vincent Giovannitti (D, term ends December 31, 2023)
  - Administrator: Jeffrey Godfrey
  - Municipal clerk: Holly Tropea

Area
  - Total: 12.03 sq mi (31.16 km^{2})
  - Land: 8.96 sq mi (23.21 km^{2})
  - Water: 3.07 sq mi (7.95 km^{2}) 25.50%
  - Rank: 193rd of 565 in state 13th of 24 in county
- Elevation: 3 ft (0.91 m)

Population (2020)
  - Total: 4,917
  - Estimate (2023): 4,993
  - Rank: 377th of 565 in state 16th of 24 in county
  - Density: 547.4/sq mi (211.4/km^{2})
  - Rank: 438th of 565 in state 20th of 24 in county
- Time zone: UTC−05:00 (Eastern (EST))
  - Summer (DST): UTC−04:00 (Eastern (EDT))
- ZIP Code: 08027 – Gibbstown
- Area code: 856 exchanges: 224, 423
- FIPS code: 3401528185
- GNIS feature ID: 0882142
- Website: www.greenwichtwp.com

Greenwich Township is a township in Gloucester County, in the U.S. state of New Jersey. As of the 2020 United States census, the township's population was 4,917, an increase of 18 (+0.4%) from the 2010 census count of 4,899, which in turn reflected an increase of 20 (+0.4%) from the 4,879 counted in the 2000 census.

Greenwich Township was first formed on March 1, 1695, and was formally incorporated as one of New Jersey's initial group of 104 townships by an act of the New Jersey Legislature on February 21, 1798. Over the centuries, portions of the township were taken to form Woolwich Township (March 7, 1767), Franklin Township (January 27, 1820), Spicer Township (March 13, 1844; now Harrison Township), Mantua Township (February 23, 1853), East Greenwich Township (February 10, 1881), and Paulsboro (March 2, 1904). The township was named for Greenwich, England.

== History ==
C. A. Nothnagle Log House in Greenwich Township is one of the oldest standing wooden structures built by European settlers in the Eastern United States. It was likely built by early Finnish-Swedish settlers after 1638 but before 1700; its precise age has not been definitively determined. A plaque at the house indicates that the structure was built between 1638 and 1643, while the National Register of Historic Places web site states: "Period of Significance: 1650–1699". The one-room cabin is constructed of square-hewn logs with a low-beamed ceiling with a large corner fireplace in a rear corner.

== Geography ==
According to the U.S. Census Bureau, the township had a total area of 12.03 square miles (31.16 km^{2}), including 8.96 square miles (23.21 km^{2}) of land and 3.07 square miles (7.95 km^{2}) of water (25.50%).

Gibbstown, with a 2020 population of 3,822, is an unincorporated community and census-designated place (CDP) in Greenwich Township. Other unincorporated communities, localities, and places located partially or completely in the township are Clements, Green, Monds Island, and Thompsons Point.

The township borders East Greenwich Township, Logan Township, and Paulsboro in Gloucester County. Greenwich Township also borders the Delaware River.

== Demographics ==
Historical population
Census	Pop.	Note	%±
1800	2,526		—
1810	2,859		13.2%
1820	2,699	*	−5.6%
1830	2,657		−1.6%
1840	2,958		11.3%
1850	3,067	*	3.7%
1860	2,199	*	−28.3%
1870	2,342		6.5%
1880	2,598		10.9%
1890	1,900	*	−26.9%
1900	2,252		18.5%
1910	874	*	−61.2%
1920	1,751		100.3%
1930	2,361		34.8%
1940	2,563		8.6%
1950	3,152		23.0%
1960	4,065		29.0%
1970	5,676		39.6%
1980	5,404		−4.8%
1990	5,102		−5.6%
2000	4,879		−4.4%
2010	4,899		0.4%
2020	4,917		0.4%
2023 (est.)	4,993		1.5%
Population sources: 1800–2000; 1800–1920 1840 1850–1870; 1850 1870 1880–1890; 1890–1910 1910–1930; 1940–2000 2000; 2010 2020 * = Lost territory in previous decade.

=== 2010 census ===
The 2010 United States census counted 4,899 people, 1,946 households, and 1,352 families in the township. The population density was 546.2 per square mile (210.9/km^{2}). There were 2,048 housing units at an average density of 228.3 per square mile (88.1/km^{2}). The racial makeup was 93.22% (4,567) White, 4.00% (196) Black or African American, 0.06% (3) Native American, 0.76% (37) Asian, 0.00% (0) Pacific Islander, 0.41% (20) from other races, and 1.55% (76) from two or more races. Hispanic or Latino of any race were 2.35% (115) of the population.

Of the 1,946 households, 25.8% had children under the age of 18; 53.3% were married couples living together; 11.6% had a female householder with no husband present and 30.5% were non-families. Of all households, 24.9% were made up of individuals and 13.3% had someone living alone who was 65 years of age or older. The average household size was 2.51 and the average family size was 3.01.

20.9% of the population were under the age of 18, 6.6% from 18 to 24, 24.8% from 25 to 44, 29.7% from 45 to 64, and 18.0% who were 65 years of age or older. The median age was 43.5 years. For every 100 females, the population had 95.7 males. For every 100 females ages 18 and older there were 92.2 males.

The Census Bureau's 2006–2010 American Community Survey showed that, in 2010 inflation-adjusted dollars, median household income was $63,817 with a margin of error of +/− $7,652, and median family income was $81,250 (+/− $14,406). Males had a median income of $47,927 (+/− $6,567) versus $41,750 (+/− $4,066) for females. The per capita income for the borough was $30,685 (+/− $3,226). About 8.1% of families and 8.9% of the population were below the poverty line, including 16.7% of those under age 18 and 5.9% of those age 65 or over.

=== 2000 census ===
As of the 2000 United States census, there were 4,879 people, 1,866 households, and 1,393 families residing in the township. The population density was 523.7 inhabitants per square mile (202.2/km^{2}). There were 1,944 housing units at an average density of 208.7 per square mile (80.6/km^{2}). The racial makeup of the township was 94.55% White, 3.32% African American, 0.10% Native American, 0.68% Asian, 0.02% Pacific Islander, 0.27% from other races, and 1.07% from two or more races. Hispanic or Latino of any race were 1.54% of the population.

There were 1,866 households, out of which 31.3% had children under the age of 18 living with them, 58.9% were married couples living together, 10.9% had a female householder with no husband present, and 25.3% were non-families. 22.1% of all households were made up of individuals, and 12.2% had someone living alone who was 65 years of age or older. The average household size was 2.61 and the average family size was 3.05.

In the township, the population was spread out, with 22.8% under the age of 18, 7.4% from 18 to 24, 27.9% from 25 to 44, 23.9% from 45 to 64, and 18.1% who were 65 years of age or older. The median age was 40 years. For every 100 females, there were 95.4 males. For every 100 females age 18 and over, there were 92.0 males.

The median income for a household in the township was $53,651, and the median income for a family was $60,565. Males had a median income of $41,875 versus $31,627 for females. The per capita income for the township was $24,791. About 1.3% of families and 3.6% of the population were below the poverty line, including 3.9% of those under age 18 and 5.3% of those age 65 or over.

== Government ==
=== Local government ===
Greenwich Township is governed within the Faulkner Act, formally known as the Optional Municipal Charter Law, under the Mayor-Council Plan A form of New Jersey municipal government, one of 71 of New Jersey's 564 municipalities that use this form. The governing body is comprised of five members elected at-large in partisan elections to serve three-year terms on a staggered basis, with two council seats up for election in each of the first two years and the mayoral seat up for vote in the third year of a three-year cycle.

As of 2025, the Mayor of Greenwich Township is Democrat Vincent Giovannitti, whose term of office ends December 31, 2023. Members of the Greenwich Township Council are Council President Joseph L. DiMenna (D, 2025), Lee Campbell (D, 2027), Antonio "Tony" Chila (D, 2025) and Wanda Tranquillo (R, 2027)).

=== Federal, state, and county representation ===
Greenwich Township is located in the 1st Congressional District and is part of New Jersey's 3rd state legislative district.

For the 119th United States Congress, New Jersey's 1st congressional district is represented by Donald Norcross (D, Camden). New Jersey is represented in the United States Senate by Democrats Cory Booker (Newark, term ends 2027) and Andy Kim (Moorestown, term ends 2031).

For the 2026–2027 session, the 3rd legislative district of the New Jersey Legislature is represented in the State Senate by John Burzichelli (D, Paulsboro) and in the General Assembly by David Bailey (D, Woodstown) and Heather Simmons (D, Glassboro).

Gloucester County is governed by a board of county commissioners, whose seven members are elected at-large to three-year terms of office on a staggered basis in partisan elections, with either two or three seats coming up for election each year. At a reorganization meeting held each January, the Board selects a Director and a Deputy Director from among its members. As of 2025, Gloucester County's Commissioners are:

Director Frank J. DiMarco (D, Deptford Township, 2025), Matt Weng (D, Pitman, 2026), Joann Gattinelli (D, Washington Township, 2026), Nicholas DeSilvio (R, Franklin Township, 2027), Denice DiCarlo (D, West Deptford Township, 2025) Deputy Director Jim Jefferson (D, Woodbury, 2026) and Christopher Konawel Jr. (R, Glassboro, 2027).

Gloucester County's constitutional officers are: Clerk James N. Hogan (D, Franklin Township; 2027), Sheriff Carmel Morina (D, Greenwich Township; 2027) and Surrogate Giuseppe "Joe" Chila (D, Woolwich Township; 2028).

=== Politics ===
United States presidential election results for Greenwich Township 2024 2020 2016 2012 2008 2004
Year	Republican		Democratic		Third party(ies)	
Year	No.	%	No.	%	No.	%
2024	1,695	57.89%	1,190	40.64%	43	1.47%
2020	1,742	56.01%	1,319	42.41%	49	1.58%
2016	1,424	54.46%	1,090	41.68%	101	3.86%
2012	1,206	45.00%	1,435	53.54%	39	1.46%
2008	1,353	45.65%	1,564	52.77%	47	1.59%
2004	1,308	44.43%	1,602	54.42%	34	1.15%

As of March 2011, there were a total of 3,690 registered voters in Greenwich Township, of which 2,246 (60.9%) were registered as Democrats, 444 (12.0%) were registered as Republicans and 1,000 (27.1%) were registered as Unaffiliated. There were no voters registered to other parties.

In the 2012 presidential election, Democrat Barack Obama received 53.5% of the vote (1,435 cast), ahead of Republican Mitt Romney with 45.0% (1,206 votes), and other candidates with 1.5% (39 votes), among the 2,712 ballots cast by the township's 3,711 registered voters (32 ballots were spoiled), for a turnout of 73.1%. In the 2008 presidential election, Democrat Barack Obama received 51.8% of the vote (1,564 cast), ahead of Republican John McCain with 44.8% (1,353 votes) and other candidates with 1.6% (47 votes), among the 3,022 ballots cast by the township's 3,863 registered voters, for a turnout of 78.2%. In the 2004 presidential election, Democrat John Kerry received 53.9% of the vote (1,602 ballots cast), outpolling Republican George W. Bush with 44.0% (1,308 votes) and other candidates with 0.9% (34 votes), among the 2,972 ballots cast by the township's 3,853 registered voters, for a turnout percentage of 77.1.

Gubernatorial election results for Greenwich Township
Year	Republican		Democratic		Third party(ies)	
Year	No.	%	No.	%	No.	%
2025	1,290	54.25%	1,066	44.83%	22	0.93%
2021	1,199	58.15%	840	40.74%	23	1.12%
2017	798	43.63%	966	52.82%	65	3.55%
2013	1,138	62.22%	677	37.01%	14	0.77%
2009	817	38.41%	1,103	51.86%	207	9.73%
2005	833	37.68%	1,311	59.29%	67	3.03%

In the 2013 gubernatorial election, Republican Chris Christie received 62.2% of the vote (1,138 cast), ahead of Democrat Barbara Buono with 37.0% (677 votes), and other candidates with 0.8% (14 votes), among the 1,915 ballots cast by the township's 3,654 registered voters (86 ballots were spoiled), for a turnout of 52.4%. In the 2009 gubernatorial election, Democrat Jon Corzine received 49.6% of the vote (1,103 ballots cast), ahead of Republican Chris Christie with 36.8% (817 votes), Independent Chris Daggett with 8.4% (187 votes) and other candidates with 0.9% (20 votes), among the 2,222 ballots cast by the township's 3,169 registered voters, yielding a 70.1% turnout.

United States Senate election results for Greenwich Township1
Year	Republican		Democratic		Third party(ies)	
Year	No.	%	No.	%	No.	%
2024	1,477	52.19%	1,319	46.61%	34	1.20%
2018	1,176	55.34%	863	40.61%	86	4.05%
2012	962	37.13%	1,572	60.67%	57	2.20%
2006	892	39.82%	1,283	57.28%	65	2.90%

United States Senate election results for Greenwich Township2
Year	Republican		Democratic		Third party(ies)	
Year	No.	%	No.	%	No.	%
2020	1,627	53.14%	1,371	44.77%	64	2.09%
2014	735	42.44%	945	54.56%	52	3.00%
2013	510	49.47%	500	48.50%	21	2.04%
2008	1,061	37.64%	1,692	60.02%	66	2.34%

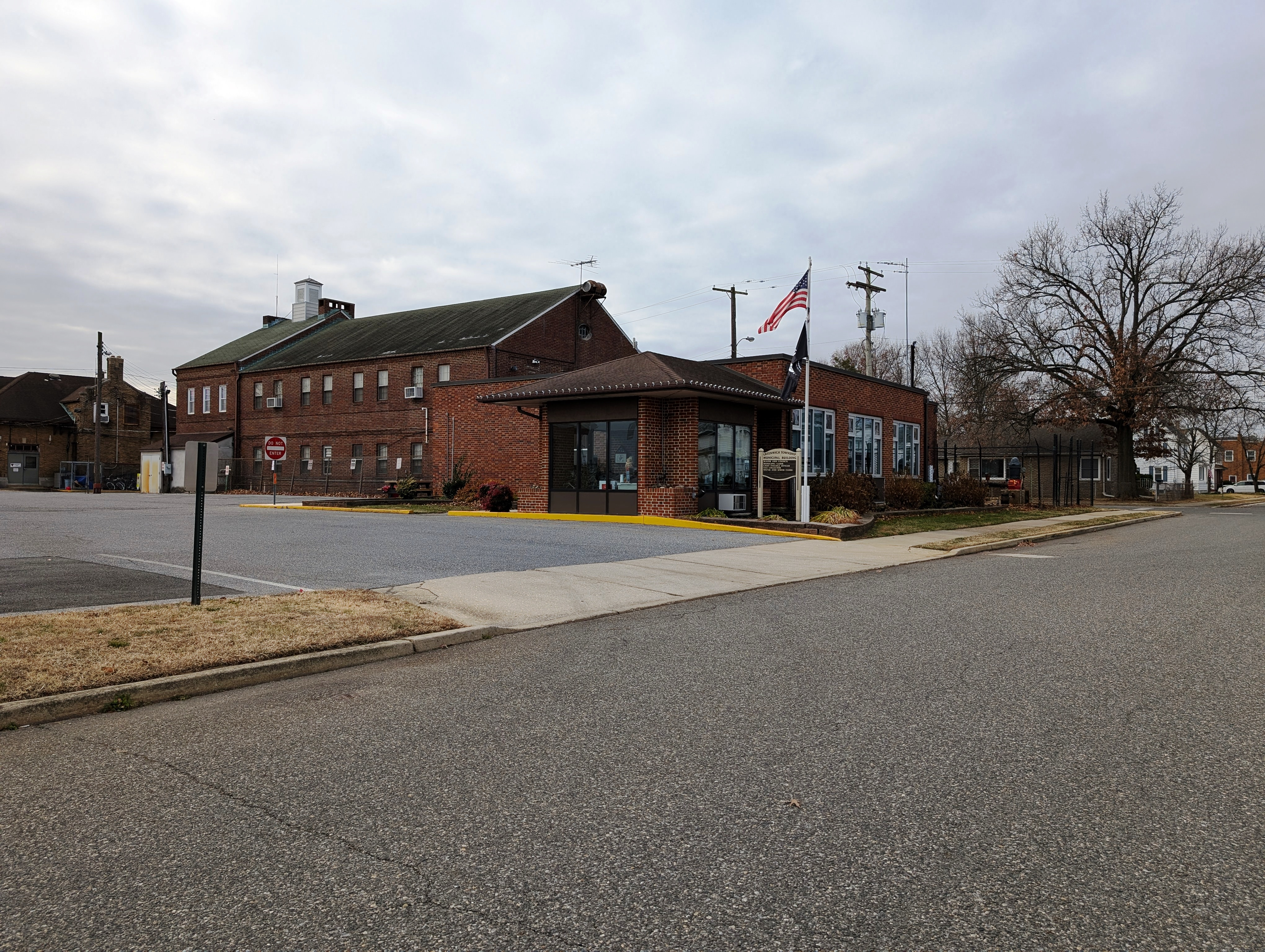
Greenwich Township Municipal Building in the Gibbstown section of the township

== Education ==
Greenwich Township School District serves public school students in kindergarten through eighth grade. As of the 2021–22 school year, the district, comprised of two schools, had an enrollment of 421 students and 43.0 classroom teachers (on an FTE basis), for a student–teacher ratio of 9.8:1. Schools in the district (with 2021–22 enrollment data from the National Center for Education Statistics) are Broad Street Elementary School with 267 students in grades K-4 and Nehaunsey Middle School with 150 students in grades 5-8.

Public school students in ninth through twelfth grades attend Paulsboro High School in Paulsboro as part of a sending/receiving relationship with the Paulsboro Public Schools. As of the 2021–22 school year, the high school had an enrollment of 359 students and 30.6 classroom teachers (on an FTE basis), for a student–teacher ratio of 11.7:1.

Students in the county are eligible to apply to attend Gloucester County Institute of Technology, a four-year high school in Deptford Township that provides technical and vocational education. As a public school, students do not pay tuition to attend the school.

Guardian Angels Regional School is a K–8 school that operates under the auspices of the Roman Catholic Diocese of Camden. Its Pre-K–3 campus is in Gibbstown while its 4–8 campus is in Paulsboro.

== Transportation ==
=== Roads and highways ===
As of May 2010, the township had a total of 38.06 miles (61.25 km) of roadways, of which 23.72 miles (38.17 km) were maintained by the municipality, 8.96 miles (14.42 km) by Gloucester County and 5.38 miles (8.66 km) by the New Jersey Department of Transportation.

Several major roadways cross the township. Route 44 passes through the center of the township and U.S. Route 130 and Interstate 295 multiplexed together pass near the town's southern center with three interchanges: Exits 15, 16, and 17 on the border with neighboring East Greenwich Township.

=== Public transportation ===
NJ Transit bus service is available between the township and Philadelphia on the 402 route.

The Port of Paulsboro includes marine transfer operations at PBF Energy's Paulsboro Refinery in Gibbstown and at Thompson Point, and is served by SMS Rail Lines for the rail spur to the refinery and the freight rail Penns Grove Secondary.

== Notable people ==
People who were born in, residents of, or otherwise closely associated with Greenwich Township include:

- Stanley Druckenmiller (born 1953), hedge fund manager
- Lewis Earle (born 1933), member of the Florida House of Representatives from 1968 to 1974
- Sylvia Earle (born 1935), marine biologist
- Alex Silvestro (born 1988), former football tight end / defensive end who played in the NFL for the Baltimore Ravens and New England Patriots
