= Nick Comoroto =

American professional wrestler (born 1991)

Personal information
- Born: Nicholas Comoroto; April 22, 1991 (age 35) Blackwood, New Jersey, U.S.
- Education: Rowan University

Professional wrestling career
- Ring name(s): Nick Comoroto; Nick Ogarelli
- Billed height: 6 ft 3 in (191 cm)
- Billed weight: 273 lb (124 kg)
- Trained by: Q. T. Marshall (Monster Factory); WWE Performance Center; Dustin Rhodes
- Debut: 2013

Nicholas Comoroto (born April 22, 1991) is an American professional wrestler who wrestles for All Elite Wrestling (AEW) and its sister promotion, Ring of Honor (ROH). Comoroto began his career in 2013 on the independent circuit. In 2019, he signed a development contract with WWE, but was released the next year as part of a series of budget cuts stemming from the COVID-19 pandemic, joining AEW later that year.

== Early life ==
Comoroto grew up in the Blackwood section of Gloucester Township, New Jersey, where he attended Gloucester Catholic High School and Gloucester County College, participating in amateur wrestling at both. He went on to attend Rowan University, where he studied accounting.

== Professional wrestling career ==
=== Early career (2013–2019) ===
Comoroto was trained to wrestle by Q. T. Marshall at the Monster Factory in his home state of New Jersey. He wrestled his first recorded match in 2013 for the Williamstown, New Jersey–based Old Time Wrestling promotion, where he was billed as the incumbent Classic Champion. From 2014 to 2017, Comoroto competed primarily for the Paulsboro, New Jersey–based Monster Factory Pro Wrestling promotion, where he held the MFPW Heavyweight Championship on one occasion, the MFPW Live Championship on two occasions, and the MFPW Tag Team Championship on three occasions. In 2015, he teamed with Billy Damiana as "Shooterz Inc.", while in 2016, he teamed with Kyle the Beast as "Beast Cartel". In 2017 and 2018, Comoroto wrestled for a range of promotions throughout the Northeastern United States, including Ring of Honor in Philadelphia, Pennsylvania, EVOLVE in Melrose, Massachusetts, and MCW Pro Wrestling in Maryland.

=== WWE (2019–2020) ===
In February 2019, Comoroto signed a contract with WWE, where he was assigned to its developmental brand, NXT. In March 2019, he began wrestling on NXT live events throughout Florida. In May 2019, he participated in the third annual WWE Performance Center combine, where he was the top ranked male in the velocity bench press contest. In July 2019, he was given the ring name "Nick Ogarelli". Comoroto made his final appearance with NXT in March 2020. In April 2020, he was released by WWE as part of a series of budget cuts connected with the COVID-19 pandemic.

=== All Elite Wrestling / Ring of Honor (2020–present) ===
In October 2020, Comoroto made his first appearance with the Jacksonville, Florida–based promotion All Elite Wrestling, losing to Darby Allin on episode #56 of the web television show AEW Dark. He made multiple further appearances on AEW Dark throughout late 2020 and early 2021. In January 2021, Comoroto appeared on episode #69 of the TNT television show AEW Dynamite, losing to Jon Moxley via referee's decision. Comoroto subsequently formed an alliance with Dustin Rhodes and Q. T. Marshall, thus joining Nightmare Family. On the March 31, 2021 episode of AEW Dynamite, Comoroto and several other students joined with Q. T. Marshall in attacking members of Nightmare Family, with Comoroto subsequently becoming part of Marshall's new stable, "The Factory" and turning heel in the process. In March 2023, Marshall stated that The Factory had disbanded. In April 2023, Comoroto made his debut in AEW's sister promotion, Ring of Honor. He went on to appear regularly on Ring of Honor Wrestling, occasionally teaming with Jacoby Watts. In August 2024, Comoroto announced that he had undergone hip resurfacing surgery and would be recuperating until 2025. Comoroto returned from injury in April 2025, teaming with Myles Hawkins and Rhett Titus in a loss to The Opps on AEW Dynamite. In March 2026, he formed a stable with Aaron Solo and Q. T. Marshall.

=== New Japan Pro Wrestling (2022) ===
Comoroto debuted in New Japan Pro Wrestling (NJPW) in April 2022, teaming with Aaron Solo in a loss to Clark Connors and Karl Fredericks on an episode of NJPW Strong recorded in Los Angeles, California. Over the next several weeks, he made several other appearances on NJPW Strong, including teaming with Solo in a tournament to crown the inaugural Strong Openweight Tag Team Champions. At the AEW/NJPW joint pay-per-view Forbidden Door in June 2022, Comoroto lost to Lance Archer.

== Professional wrestling style and persona ==
Comoroto uses the nicknames "Freak Beast" and "Wrecking Ball". His appearance has been compared to fellow wrestler Bruiser Brody. While wrestling for AEW, he adopted a gorilla press powerslam as his finishing move.

== Personal life ==
On December 20, 2022, Comoroto disclosed that he had attention deficit hyperactivity disorder.

== Championships and accomplishments ==
- Monster Factory Pro Wrestling
  - MFPW Heavyweight Championship (1 time)
  - MFPW Live Championship (2 times)
  - MFPW Tag Team Championship (3 times) – with Billy Damiana (2 times) and Kyle the Beast (1 time)
- Old Time Wrestling
  - OTW Classic Championship (1 time)
- SuperKrazee Pro Wrestling
  - Skid Row Academy Tag Team Championship (1 time)– with Noah Stryker
