= Monster Factory =

American professional wrestling school

- Founded: 1983
- Defunct: 2025
- Style: Professional wrestling
- Headquarters: 541c Mantua Avenue; Paulsboro, New Jersey, United States
- Founder(s): Larry Sharpe; Buddy Rogers
- Owner: Danny Cage

Monster Factory was a professional wrestling school and promotion located in Paulsboro, New Jersey. It was considered to be the first publicly available professional wrestling school. Larry Sharpe and “Nature Boy” Buddy Rogers founded the Monster Factory in 1983. In 2011, Danny Cage purchased the school from Sharpe. The Monster Factory ceased operations in November 2025.

== Pretty Boy Larry Sharpe's Monster Factory (1983–2011) ==
Sharpe's first pupils included Tony Atlas, King Kong Bundy, and Bam Bam Bigelow, who Sharpe broke in at New York City nightclub Studio 54. Some were attracted to train at the school by Bigelow's success, which made the school notable enough to attract future attendee Raven while Tatanka would end up at the school by a chance meeting with Rogers in a video rental store.

=== 2008 fire ===
In February 2008, the school was threatened by a fire which had started at the building adjacent to the school, ANA Laboratories, and the building was evacuated by the school trainers. The fire was confined to the laboratory until its roof collapsed; however, according to Camden County Chief Fire Marshal Paul Hartstein, only a firewall prevented the fire from reaching the school. The school had been in the middle of drills when the fire broke out, although all the students were safely evacuated to the outside parking lot.

== The World Famous Monster Factory (2011–2025) ==
In 2011, Danny Cage purchased the name from Larry Sharpe. Monster Factory relocated to the Paulsboro Wrestling Club in Paulsboro, New Jersey. Following the move, Cage began to supplement training with seminars featuring WWE scout Gerald Brisco, Ring of Honor lead announcer Kevin Kelly, Ohio Valley Wrestling's Rip Rogers, Les Thatcher, as well as wrestlers Montel Vontavious Porter, Colt Cabana, Stevie Richards, Bob Evans, Robbie E, The Powers of Pain, and Sean Waltman. The Monster Factory also conducted birthday parties and ring rentals.

The Monster Factory put on a show featuring the school’s students called ‘Total Rasslin’ Live’ on Friday nights, in addition to their monthly main shows.

In late 2013, Cage had his first pupil signed to a WWE development deal. Stephen Kupryk, known at the Monster Factory as Tommy Maclin and now as Steve Cutler, left the Monster Factory in January 2014 and made his NXT debut as Cutler in June 2014. In November 2014, Ultimate Fighting Championship fighter Matt Riddle enlisted in the school. Additionally, Monster Factory students and graduates have appeared as extras and performers on WWE Raw, WWE SmackDown, WWE NXT, and Ring of Honor television since Cage assumed control of the school.

In October 2025, The Monster Factory announced its departure from the Paulsboro Wrestling Club due to the venue owner wanting to focus solely on amateur wrestling going forward. The school's training operations moved to Mount Holly, New Jersey to share a facility with Pro Wrestling Star Academy owned by Pro Wrestling Unplugged (PWU) and Super Powers of Wrestling (SPO) owners Johnny Kashmere and Tommy and JP Grayson. Shortly after, Danny Cage announced The Monster Factory would shut down operations. The final Monster Factory show, Turkey Slam 2025, was held on November 22, 2025 at the 2300 Arena.

=== Apple TV+ documentary series ===
In March 2023, a six episode documentary series produced by Vox Media entitled Monster Factory was released by Apple TV+. The series follows the lives of Danny Cage and six of his students: Notorious Mimi, Gabby Ortiz, Goldy, Bobby Buffet, and Lucas "Twitch" DiSangro. It also features appearances from Monster Factory alumni Kevin Kelly, Q. T. Marshall, D'Lo Brown and The Headbangers, as well as Mandy Leon, Anthony Bowens, and Crowbar.

== Notable alumni ==
The Monster Factory's graduates include:

- Balls Mahoney
- Bam Bam Bigelow
- Barry Hardy
- Paul "Big Show" Wight
- Chris Candido
- Chris Harris
- D'Lo Brown
- Damian Priest
- Domino
- Giant Silva
- Gillberg
- The Godfather
- The Headbangers
- Ian Riccaboni
- J. T. Southern
- King Kong Bundy
- Matt Riddle
- Nick Comoroto
- Notorious Mimi
- The Pitbulls
- Preston Vance
- Q. T. Marshall
- Raven
- Ray Odyssey
- Rocco Rock
- Sheamus
- Sonjay Dutt
- Steve Maclin
- Tank Toland
- Tatanka
- Tony Atlas
- Tony Stetson
- "Virgil" Mike Jones

== Trainers ==
- Danny Cage
- Missy Sampson
- Larry Sharpe (deceased)
- The Blue Meanie
- Billy Wiles
- Q. T. Marshall
