= Sloane Jacobs =

American professional wrestler and taekwondo practitioner (born 2003)

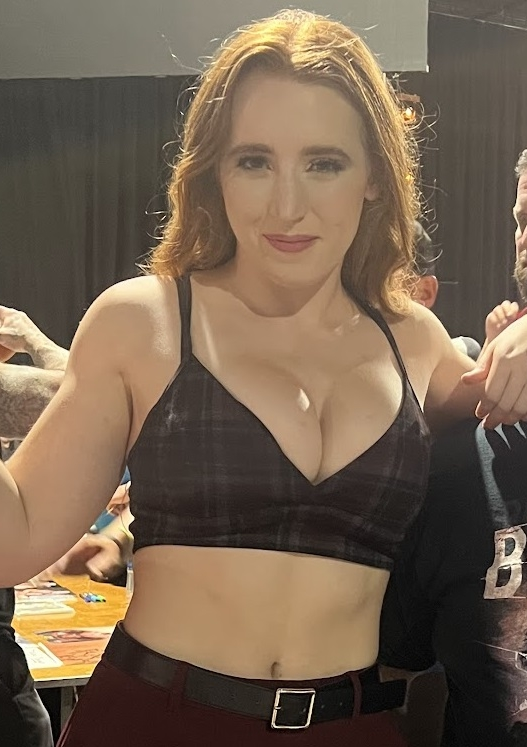
- Herr in July 2024

Personal information
- Born: Amelia Herr; January 5, 2003 (age 23) West Chester, Pennsylvania, U.S.

Professional wrestling career
- Ring name(s): Notorious Mimi; Sloane Jacobs
- Billed height: 5 ft 8 in (1.73 m)
- Billed weight: 147 lb (67 kg)
- Trained by: Danny Cage; Sara Del Rey
- Debut: July 2018

Amelia Herr (born January 5, 2003) is an American professional wrestler. She is signed to WWE, where she performs on the Evolve brand under the ring name Sloane Jacobs. She also wrestles on the independent circuit under the ring name Notorious Mimi.

== Early life ==
Herr is a native of West Chester, Pennsylvania and a 2021 graduate of Unionville High School in Kennett Square, Pennsylvania. She majored in criminal justice. Herr has two years of training in Taekwondo, and was trained in professional wrestling at the Monster Factory in Paulsboro, New Jersey, at the age of 14.

== Professional wrestling career ==
=== Independent circuit (2018–present) ===
Herr had her debut match in July 2018 and began regularly wrestling on the independent circuits in 2019, participating in several promotions, particularly in the Northeastern United States.

=== All Elite Wrestling (2021) ===
She made her debut with All Elite Wrestling on October 11, 2021, in a losing match to Penelope Ford on AEW Dark: Elevation. She went on to make several further appearances on AEW Dark and AEW Dark: Elevation, including a match against Emi Sakura on Elevation on December 13, 2021.

=== WWE (2022) ===
Herr participated in tryouts at the WWE Performance Center in Orlando, Florida in December 2021. She was announced among a class of recruits who reported to the WWE Performance Center on March 14, 2022, to begin training with WWE. She began performing for their NXT brand and made her WWE debut on NXT on March 29, in a loss to Nikkita Lyons. She also faced newcomer Roxanne Perez on NXT Level Up on April 15, which also resulted in a defeat for Jacobs. Jacobs picked up her first victory in NXT over Thea Hail on the May 3, 2022, edition of NXT 2.0. On the July 19 episode of NXT, Jacobs competed in a 20-woman battle royal to determine the number one contender for the NXT Women's Championship, which was won by a returning Zoey Stark. On November 1, 2022, it was reported that Herr was released from her WWE contract along with other NXT talent.

=== Ring of Honor (2023) ===
On the April 6, 2023, episode of Ring of Honor Wrestling, Mimi made her debut in a losing effort to Willow Nightingale. Mimi made a second appearance on the June 15 episode losing to Miranda Alize.

=== Major League Wrestling (2023-2024) ===
Notorious Mimi debuted in Major League Wrestling at the October 14 taping in a loss against Tiara James.

=== Return to WWE (2026-present) ===
Herr would challenge for the then-vacant WWE Women's ID championship at Wrestling Open Rhode Island's event, Wrestling Open RI 33, on November 17, 2025, in a six-woman elimination challenge which was won by Laynie Luck.

On February 12, 2026, she confirmed on her Instagram she has a WWE tryout, and on March 21, 2026, Herr was announced to be under the WWE ID program, returning to her ring name Sloane Jacobs, at Beyond Wrestling. Mimi attacked Laynie Luck, declining the WWE ID contract instead choosing to set her sights on the WWE Women's ID Championship as her way of coming back. On the April 8 edition Evolve, Jacobs made her WWE in ring return defeating Veronica Haven, Anya Rune & Gianna Capri, and earning herself a spot in the women's gauntlet match for the vacant Evolve Women's championship, the following week she would lose the gauntlet match to Wendy Choo, and the week after would establish herself as a heel by joining Nikkita Lyons in a beatdown against Choo & Laynie Luck, on the May 27 edition of EVOLVE, Jacobs would pin Choo in tag team action, and would earn herself a Evolve Women's title match against Choo, which she would lose the following week.

== Other media ==
Herr was featured on Monster Factory, an Apple TV docu-series created that focused on the wrestling school where she trained.

== Championships and accomplishments ==
- 1CW Pro Wrestling

- 1CW Women's Championship (1 time)

- Belle 2 Belle

- Belle 2 Belle Diamonds Championship (1 time)

- Monster Factory Pro Wrestling

- Monster Factory Championship (1 times)
- MFPW Girls Championship (2 times, final)
- MFPW Supersonic Championship (1 time)
- MFPW Tag Team Championship (2 times) - with Travis Jacobs
- MFPW Heavyweight Title #1 Contendership Battle Royal (2025)
- Larry Sharpe Memorial Cup (2025)

- Remarkable Wrestling

- Remarkable Women's Championship (1 time, current)

- Invictus Pro Wrestling

- Invictus Women's Championship (1 time, inaugural)

- Kickstart My Heart Wrestling

- KSMH Viking Or Valkyrie Intergender Championship (1 time)

- Pro Wrestling Magic

- PWM Women's Championship (1 time, current)

- Titan Championship Wrestling

- TCW Goddess Championship (1 time, inaugural)
