= Danny Cage =

American professional wrestler and trainer

Personal information
- Born: Daniel Michael McDonald; December 19, 1973 (age 52) Cinnaminson Township, New Jersey, United States

Professional wrestling career
- Ring name(s): Danny Cage; The Ragin' Cajun
- Billed height: 6 ft 0 in (183 cm)
- Billed weight: 210 lb (95 kg)
- Billed from: Paulsboro, New Jersey
- Trained by: Larry Sharpe; Glenn Ruth
- Debut: 1998

Daniel Michael McDonald (born December 19, 1973) is an American former professional wrestler and trainer better known under his ring names ‘’‘Danny Cage’’’ and ‘’‘The Ragin’ Cajun’’’. His professional wrestling career was cut short by a back injury.

== Professional wrestling career ==
Cage was a high school cheerleader in New Jersey who became interested in training at the Monster Factory at age 12 at a time when his parents were going through a divorce. Cage's father wanted him to be productive with his life and to go to college but Cage, disappointing his father, wanted to pursue his dream of becoming a professional wrestler. Cage convinced his father to put money offered to pay for college toward training at the Monster Factory on the condition Cage got into good shape.

Cage had a tryout in 1994 conducted by Larry Sharpe and Glenn Ruth, which Cage passed and was offered the opportunity to train. Cage's father rescinded his offer and Cage would put his dreams on hold until he attended a wrestling card in North Carolina where Joey Matthews and Steve Corino were competing. A friend named Toad advised Cage to return to New Jersey to pursue his dream. In September 1998, Cage began training at the Monster Factory.

Cage competed as a pro wrestler until 2002 before hurting his back, crossing paths with notable Monster Factory alumni Cliff Compton and Sheamus during his stay. Cage would return before retiring from the ring for good in 2005, having his last match with Q.T. Marshall.

== Monster Factory ==
In 2011, Cage took a co-ownership role of the Monster Factory. Cage and Sharpe moved the Monster Factory to its original home town, Paulsboro, before assuming full ownership from Sharpe.

In 2013, Cage added former WWE and ECW wrestler The Blue Meanie and former ECW wrestler Billy Wiles as trainers at the Monster Factory and began to supplement training with seminars with WWE scout Gerald Brisco, former Ring of Honor lead announcer Kevin Kelly, Ohio Valley Wrestling's Rip Rogers, Les Thatcher, as well as wrestlers Montel Vontavious Porter, Colt Cabana, Stevie Richards, "Brutal" Bob Evans, Robbie E, The Powers of Pain, and Sean Waltman. The Monster Factory also conducted birthday parties and ring rentals. In 2014, Marshall was added as an additional trainer while other wrestlers, like Jay Lethal and Waltman began to drop by for informal training sessions.

Cage successfully ran the school until 2025, when he was forced to step back due to health issues. Shortly after, he announced the Monster Factory would close operations following its final ever show at the 2300 Arena on November 22, 2025.

Cage's method of training earned him praise from former WWE commentator Kevin Kelly, who has said: "Monster Factory takes seeds and grows crops in a setting that rivals the (WWE) Performance Center" and has seen students signed to WWE developmental deals and appear on WWE and Ring of Honor television.

In March 2023, Apple TV+ released a six episode documentary series entitled Monster Factory in partnership with Vox Media. The documentary starred Cage and five Monster Factory students: Notorious Mimi, Gabby Ortiz, Goldy, Bobby Buffet, and Lucas "Twitch" DiSangro. It tells the story of their training and personal lives, as well as the origins of the Monster Factory school.
