= Tinicum Island Rear Range Light =

Lighthouse in Gloucester County, New Jersey

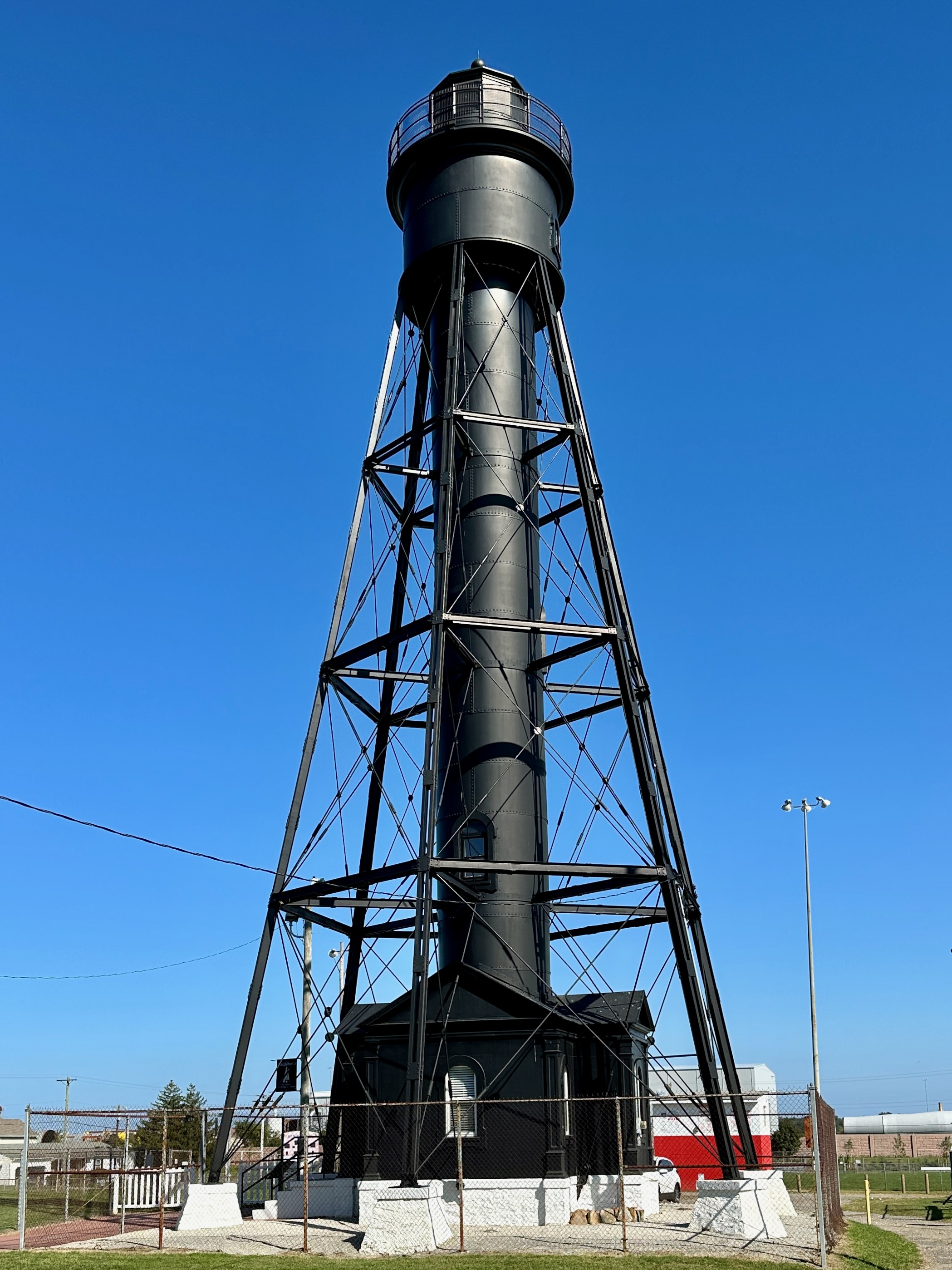
- Tinicum Island Rear Range Light in October 2023
- Location: 250 feet (76 m) 70 Second Street, Paulsboro, New Jersey, U.S.
- Coordinates: 39°50′51″N 75°14′23″W

Tower
- Constructed: 1880
- Foundation: Stone masonry
- Construction: Iron
- Automated: 1933
- Height: 85 feet (26 m)
- Shape: Hexagonal skeletal tower with a spiral staircase with 112 steps to the lantern room
- Heritage: National Register of Historic Places listed place, listed on the New Jersey Register of Historic Places

Light
- First lit: 1880
- Focal height: 34 m (112 ft)
- Lens: Parabolic reflector (original), DCB-24 Aerobeacon (current)
- Light source: Electricity
- Intensity: 500,000 candlepower from 1,000 watt lamp
- Range: 18 miles (29 km) (within the sight line between front and rear lights)
- Characteristic: Fixed red
- Tinicum Island Range Rear Light Station
- U.S. National Register of Historic Places
- New Jersey Register of Historic Places
- Area: 0.9 acres (0.36 ha)
- Architect: United States Lighthouse Board
- Architectural style: Classical Revival
- MPS: Light Stations of the United States MPS
- NRHP reference No.: 05001053
- NJRHP No.: 208

Significant dates
- Added to NRHP: September 15, 2005
- Designated NJRHP: July 12, 2005

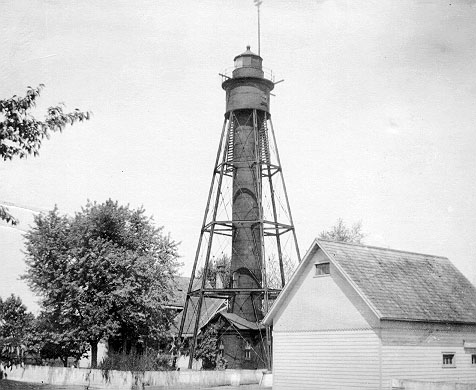
The lighthouse when keeper's dwelling and related structures were still in place

The Tinicum Island Rear Range Light is a lighthouse located in the Billingsport section of Paulsboro in Gloucester County, New Jersey, the rear of a pair of range lights marking a section of the channel in the Delaware River south of Philadelphia.

The lighthouse is surrounded by baseball fields next to the new marine terminal for the Port of Paulsboro and is still active for navigation on the Delaware River. It works in conjunction with the Tinicum Front Range Light, known as the Billingsport Front Light, situated on the banks of the Delaware River at the front of Fort Billings Park next to the Paulsboro Refinery.

Front and rear range lighthouses guide sailors who, by aligning the two lights and keeping one light on top of the other, stay in its center and avoid Little Tinicum Island as they travel upstream.

The Tinicum Island Range Lights were activated on New Year's Eve 1880. They had a visible range of 8.5 nautical miles (15.7 km; 9.8 mi). The lights were changed from oil to electric in 1917. The Coast Guard automated the lights in 1933. The light tower originally had a keeper's dwelling with seven rooms, along with a brick oil house, frame barn and barnyard, cow shed, poultry house, and privy on 4.8 acres (1.9 ha) of land. The dwelling buildings were demolished sometime in the 1950s after they fell into disrepair. The rear range lighthouse, which is owned by the United States Coast Guard, was added to the National Register of Historic Places on September 15, 2005.

Tinicum Rear Range Lighthouse Society offers regular tours, including a climb to the top of the tower, the third full weekend of each month from April through October and special tours with advance notice. Surrounding views from the lighthouse include Philadelphia and its airport.

== See also ==
- National Register of Historic Places listings in Gloucester County, New Jersey
