= Dick Batchelor =

American politician

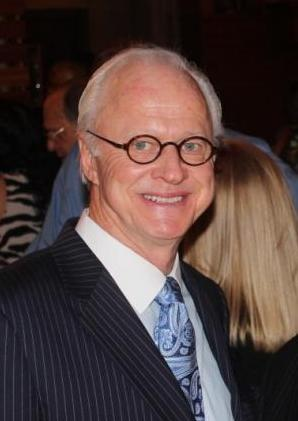

Member of the Florida House of Representatives from the 43rd district
- In office 1974–1982
- Preceded by: Lewis Earle
- Succeeded by: Rick Dantzler

Personal details
- Born: December 12, 1947 (age 78)
- Party: Democratic
- Education: University of Central Florida
- Profession: political analyst, consultant, businessman
- Website: dickbatchelor.com

Military service
- Branch/service: United States Marine Corps
- Years of service: 1966–1968
- Battles/wars: Vietnam War; Tet Offensive

Dick J. Batchelor (born December 12, 1947) is a former member of the Florida House of Representatives. He is president of Dick Batchelor Management Group, Inc., a management consulting firm that specializes in business development, strategic governmental affairs and public policy issues. He has been featured numerous times as one of the "50 Most Powerful People in Orlando."

== Early life ==
Batchelor was born the middle child of seven in Fort Bragg, North Carolina. His mother and father worked on tobacco fields as tenant farmers. When Batchelor was still a child, they relocated to Orlando, Florida, where his father worked in construction and later as a carpenter. From 1957 to 1960, the family lived in Reeves Terrace, which operates today as a public housing complex for low-income families. Three years later, the family moved to a house in the Orlo Vista neighborhood of Orange County, Florida. Batchelor attended Maynard Evans High School, where he graduated in 1966.

=== Military service and education ===
Between 1966 and 1968, Batchelor served as a volunteer with the United States Marine Corps. He was deployed to Vietnam from 1967 to 1968 and stationed in the port city of Da Nang during the Tet Offensive. Batchelor has said that his experience in the military is where he learned how to effectively work alongside people of different backgrounds, ethnicities and religions in the pursuit of a common goal.

Upon returning to the United States, Batchelor used the G.I. Bill to further his education. He attended Valencia Community College (now Valencia College) and the University of Central Florida, earning a Bachelor of Science degree in 1971. He also completed post baccalaureate work in Political Science and Public Administration at the University of Central Florida.

In 1975 and 1988, Batchelor was appointed to the American Council of Young Political Leaders (ACYPL) and served on missions to Poland, Romania, Guatemala, Honduras, El Salvador, and Vietnam.

In 2012, Batchelor joined fellow Evans High School alumnus and U.S. Congressman Dan Webster in the unveiling of a new memorial dedicated to the twenty-three fallen Vietnam veterans who were graduates of the school. During the ceremony, family members of the men were called forward and presented with a folded flag once flown over the nation's capital.

== Career ==
=== Legislative service ===
Batchelor is one of the youngest individuals ever to serve in the Florida House of Representatives. He ran in 1974 at age 26. Representing District 43, Batchelor won with more than two-thirds of the vote.

Five of Batchelor's eight years in legislative service were spent in leadership roles. He served as chairman of the Auditing Committee, the Health and Rehabilitative Services Committee and the House Energy Committee, in addition to chairman of four subcommittees. Batchelor received more than 50 awards for his legislative service, including the Common Cause award for open government and the Sigma Delta Chi award for "most open elected official".

=== U.S. Presidential appointments ===
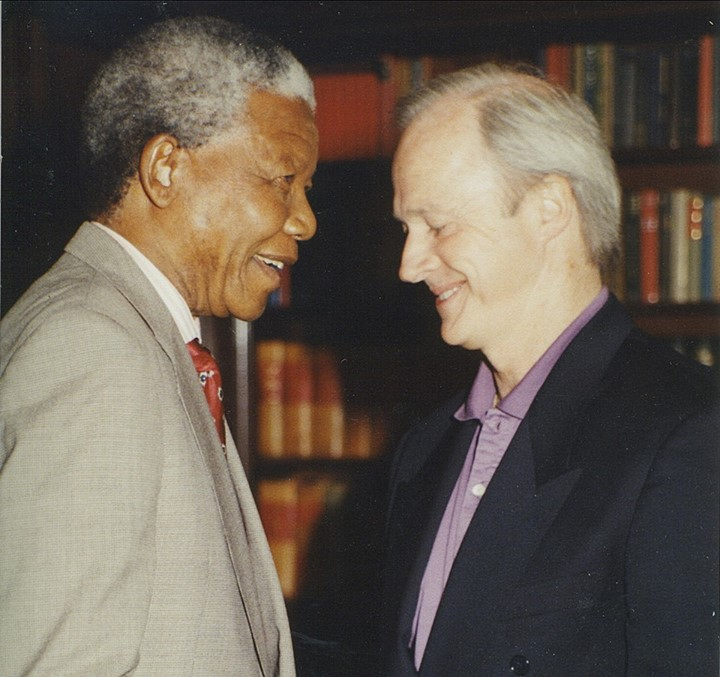
Mandela & Batchelor

In 1994, Batchelor was appointed by President Bill Clinton to serve as a member of the U.S. delegation to observe the South African elections. He traveled alongside Jesse Jackson and met with President-elect Nelson Mandela following the historic election that marked the end of the apartheid era.

In 2000, Clinton appointed Batchelor to the United Nations Commission on Human Rights. Batchelor traveled to Geneva, Switzerland, where he spent six weeks examining abuses and drafting resolutions to condemn violations made by certain countries, the timeliest of which was one criticizing Russia for their invasion of Chechnya, he said. Three years later, Batchelor returned to Geneva as an observer to the 59th annual meeting of the commission in the wake of mounting global criticism surrounding the U.S. 2003 invasion of Iraq.

=== Consulting work ===
Batchelor established his own firm in 1986, and continues to specialize in providing business development consulting services, strategic government relations and public affairs issues management to his clients.

== Community involvement ==
=== Education reform and child advocacy issues ===
In 2002, Batchelor was named "Central Floridian of the Year" by the Orlando Sentinel for his successful efforts to generate more than $2 billion worth of funding in construction and renovation for Orange County Public Schools. After six prior referendum efforts had failed to generate some level of taxation to support the district's dire construction challenges, Batchelor organized the "Change 4 Kids" campaign.

The ballot initiative passed with nearly 60 percent of the vote, despite the fact that fewer than 25 percent of residents had children enrolled in the county's public school system. Batchelor was widely credited for helping coalesce the community at large to support the effort.

In the fall of 2013, the Orlando Sentinel reported that Dick Batchelor would again serve as chairman for the effort to renew the tax. The decision to extend the sales tax went on the ballot before local voters in 2014.

From 1980 to 2014, Batchelor served as honorary chairman of the Dick Batchelor Run for the Children, which raised more than $1 million. The race was the largest annual fundraiser for the Howard Phillips Center for Children and Families, which is part of the Arnold Palmer Hospital for Children.

In 2007, Batchelor was among 15 people appointed by former Gov. Charlie Crist to his Children and Youth Cabinet.

Batchelor was the recipient of the 2010 Chiles Advocacy Award for his dedication "to improving the lives of children by successfully promoting policies and programs that benefit those children and families." He was recognized as the 2019 "Champion of Education" at the UNCF Orlando Mayor's Luncheon.

Batchelor has previously served as chairman of the Florida Hospital for Children Board, chair to the Children's Leadership Alliance of Orange County, and advisory board member to the Federation of Families of Central Florida.

With former Orlando Chamber of Commerce president Jacob Stuart, Batchelor led a 2018 campaign in support of a half-mill property-tax increase to fund local children's programs through an independent Children's Trust. In response to the campaign, Orange County Mayor Teresa Jacobs proposed a $20 million budget increase for children’s programs.

In 2019, Batchelor was named co-chair of the Orange County Domestic Violence Commission in response to an increase in domestic violence cases and incidents across the county. He currently serves as a board member of Florida's Children First and the Boys & Girls Clubs of Central Florida.

Batchelor also serves as vice chairman to the Washington, D.C.-based organization, Children's Environmental Health Network.

=== Other advocacy issues ===
Dick Batchelor is an advocate to a number of causes, both locally and nationally. He is the current chair of the Executive Board of the AdventHealth Foundation of Central Florida and the former chairman of the board for the Central Florida Urban League.

He serves on the Executive Council of Project Opioid and is a current board member of the First Amendment Foundation, the Hispanic Chamber of Commerce of Metro Orlando, United Abolitionists, and the Orlando Housing Authority.

Batchelor is also a member of the National Advisory Board for Human Rights First and the United States Global Leadership Coalition Florida Advisory Board.

=== Awards and recognition ===
Batchelor's contributions as a businessman and advocate have been recognized by multiple community and professional organizations. In 2002, he was named "Businessman of the Year" by Orlando Business Journal. Orlando Magazine named him a "Best Corporate Citizen" in 2008 and 2009. In 2018 and 2019, he was recognized by Florida Trend magazine as one of the 500 Most Influential Business Leaders in Florida.

In 2020, Batchelor received the Distinguished Member Award from Leadership Florida. He has been recognized as the 2021 City of Orlando, Florida Visionary Community Leader; as a Social Justice Game Changer by the Orlando Magic; and by Junior Achievement of Central Florida as their 2021 Mid-Florida Business Hall of Fame Laureate.

== Personal life ==
Batchelor met his wife, former WESH Channel 2 anchor Andrea Coudriet, in 1982. The couple have three sons.
