= 2012 Paulsboro train derailment =

Disaster in Gloucester County, New Jersey

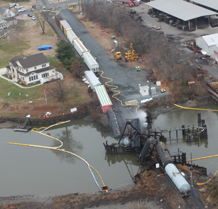
- Derailed tank cars fallen in Mantua Creek, Paulsboro, New Jersey
- Location of the derailment

Details
- Date: November 30, 2012; 13 years ago 2:50 p.m. EST (UTC−4)
- Location: Paulsboro, New Jersey
- Coordinates: 39.834609°N 75.236786°W
- Country: United States
- Operator: Norfolk Southern and Conrail
- Incident type: Derailment
- Cause: Failure of the Jefferson Street Bridge

On November 30, 2012, a daily freight train running on Conrail Shared Assets Operations Penns Grove Secondary derailed in Paulsboro, a borough with an industrial and maritime economy, in Gloucester County, New Jersey. As a result, vinyl chloride from one car leaked into the air. In 2023 several news reports drew parallels between this derailment and the 2023 Ohio train derailment in East Palestine, Ohio, which also involved release of vinyl chloride.

== Background ==
The accident happened when Jefferson Street Bridge, a swing bridge built in 1873 and jointly owned by Conrail and Norfolk Southern over Mantua Creek, failed to operate on November 30, 2012. Witnesses living adjacent to the tracks said that the accident happened at 2:50 am; the team said that derailment happened around 7:00 am. Seven cars of the 84-car consist derailed. Four tanker cars containing vinyl chloride fell into the creek; one tank was breached. As a result, the tank leaked about 23,000 gallons of the gas into the air.

Vinyl chloride is used to make adhesives, polyvinyl chloride, plastics and other chemicals. The Centers for Disease Control and Prevention has described the chemical as having an odor that can be described as sweet and mild. Low levels of exposure can cause sleepiness and dizziness. Higher level exposure can cause people to pass out or die. Long term exposure has been linked to liver cancer, and possibly lung, brain and some blood cancers.

== Results ==
A voluntary and limited evacuation zone was created. Nearby schools were ordered to take shelter and seal off their buildings. At around 7:00 pm a new evacuation order was given. An estimated 500 to 700 people in a 12-mile radius of the site evacuated. People were told to pack for three days and then were transported to hotels in the area. About 70 people were treated at Underwood-Memorial Hospital in Woodbury for exposure to the vinyl chloride, of which 60 were hospitalized.

Thousands of Paulsboro residents sued Conrail, the operator of the bridge over Mantua Creek. In subsequent interviews residents alleged that Conrail paid them off to prevent them from seeking more money in the event that they developed illnesses later.

Equipment damages were estimated at $451,000. Emergency responses and remediation costs totaled about $30 million.

The bridge had an earlier history of trouble. At around 3:00 am, on August 23, 2009, a coal train derailed; however, no cars fell off.

=== Political controversies ===
Responding to the immediate after-effects of the accident was the Unified Command response team. This group consisted of representatives of the U.S. Coast Guard, New Jersey Department of Environmental Protection, New Jersey Office of Emergency Management, the Paulsboro Fire Department and Conrail. However, the New Jersey Senate President Stephen Sweeney gave the response team an "F". Sen. Sweeney asserted that the team delayed scheduling public meetings, and that the team issued conflicting and confusing orders in the wake of the derailment. Additionally, area residents criticized Governor Chris Christie for giving inadequate attention to Paulsboro's environmental problems and that he concentrated more of his attention on Hurricane Sandy (which struck New Jersey on October 28–29). They complained that he did not visit Paulsboro and that instead he sent Lt. Governor Kim Guadagno.

Area Congressional Representatives Rob Andrews (NJ 1st-D) and Frank LoBiondo (NJ 2nd-R) visited the area and expressed concern and surprise that federal, state or local laws require public oversight of private safety inspection procedures.

Following the incident, Congressman Andrews criticized policies that may have led to the accident. He said that it was time to end the railroads' "culture of self-regulation . . . . We've got to come up with a sensible set of regulations." He also criticized the Unified Command's operation as confusing and ineffective. "When everyone's in charge, no one's in charge." Andrews also said that he expected Congress to hold hearings on the causes of the derailment and the response.

=== Legacy ===
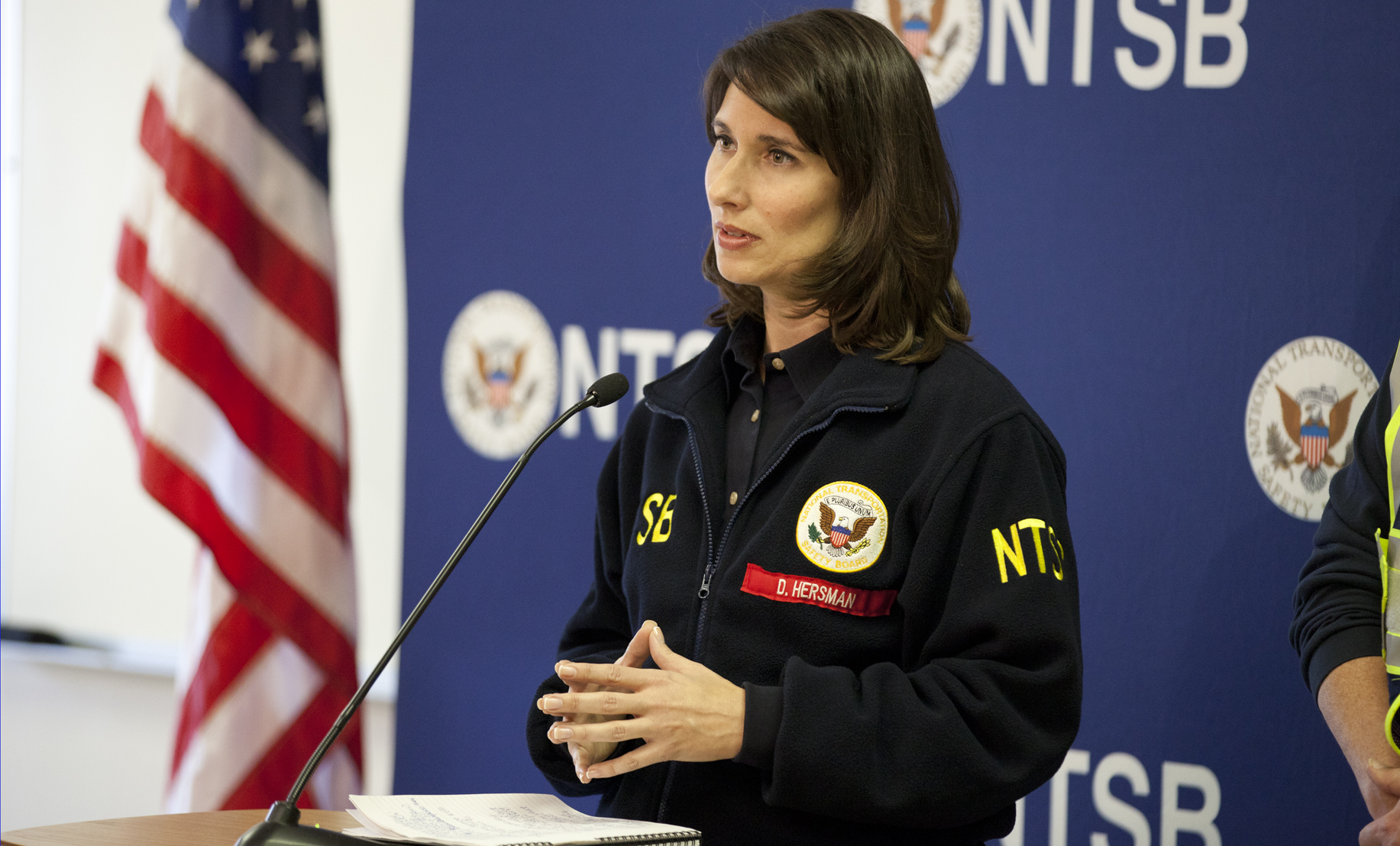
NTSB Chairwoman Deborah Hersman at December 3, 2012 press hearing on the derailment.

The National Transportation Safety Board in a public hearing faulted the first responders for their actions. The investigators said that local authorities did not follow standard procedures for cleaning a chemical spill and that first responders were not provided proper breathing apparatuses, even though monitors indicated unsafe levels of chemicals in the air. They said that this led to further exposure of the first responders and the public to the vinyl chloride gas. Paulsboro police reported the gas as non-toxic, even after fire officials learned that the gas was highly flammable and dangerous to breathe.

In March 2013, Conrail announced that the bridge would be replaced with an expected September 2014 operational date. Normally, between March 1 and November 30 the bridge would be left in the open position for maritime traffic and closed when trains approach. It remained locked in the closed position until the bridge was replaced. The new bridge opened in March 2015.

Prior to this incident, railroads had different protocols for transporting dangerous chemicals. This incident was followed by more railroads adopting federal guidelines for transporting such chemicals.

== See also ==
- Port of Paulsboro
