= Q. T. Marshall =

American professional wrestler (born 1985)

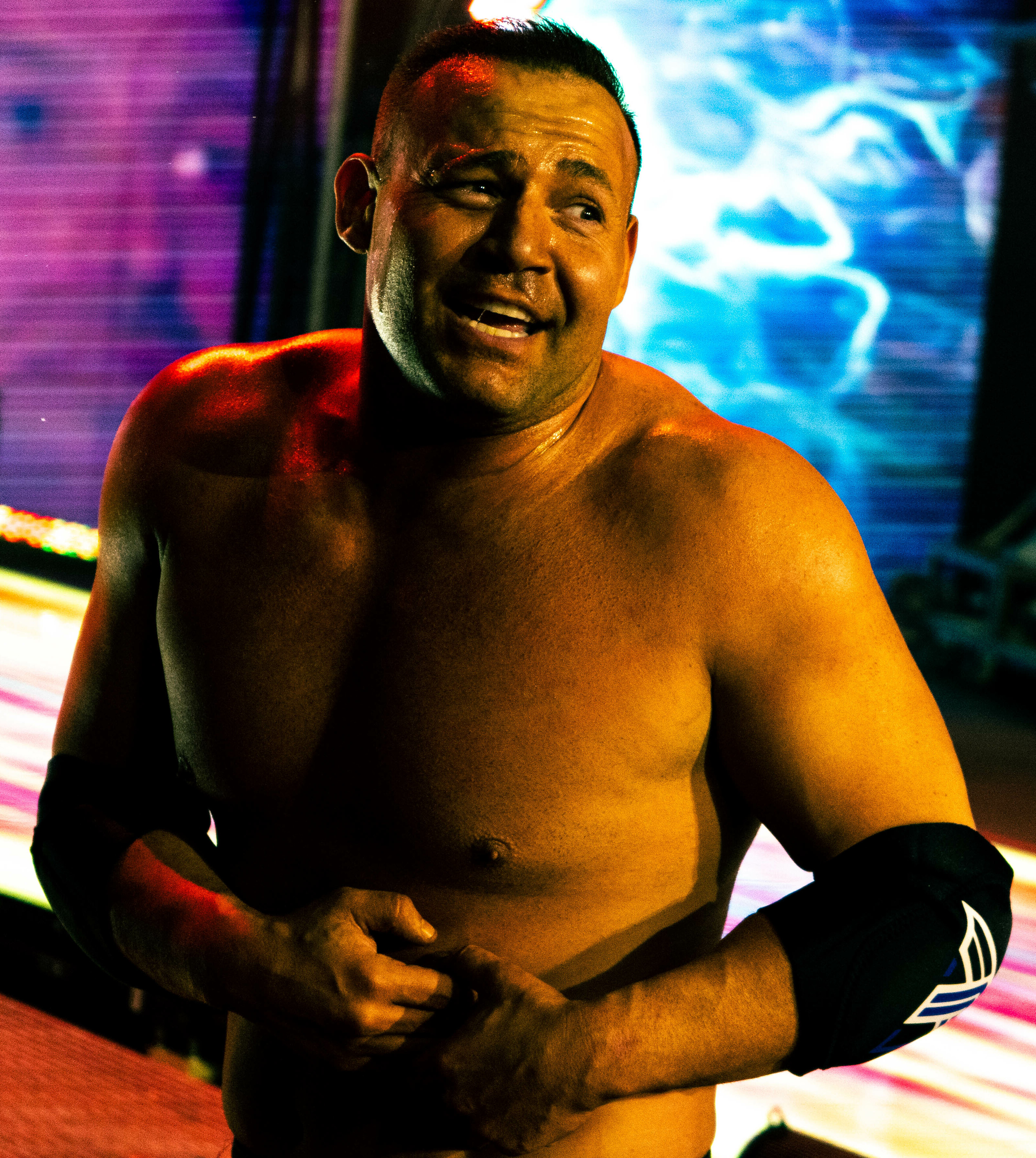
- Marshall in 2022

Personal information
- Born: Michael Cuellari; July 16, 1985 (age 41) Livingston, New Jersey, U.S.
- Spouse: Carolyn Fazio (m. 2016)

Professional wrestling career
- Ring names: Michael Q. Laurie; Mike Cuellari; Mike Marshall; Q. T. Marshall
- Billed height: 6 ft 0 in (183 cm)
- Billed weight: 234 lb (106 kg)
- Billed from: Freehold, New Jersey; The Big Apple; Atlanta, Georgia
- Trained by: Bubba Ray Dudley; Chasyn Rance; D-Von Dudley; Larry Sharpe; Larry Zbyszko; Scott Hall
- Debut: July 4, 2004

Michael Cuellari (born July 16, 1985), better known by the ring name Q. T. Marshall, is an American professional wrestler, trainer, and promoter. He is signed to All Elite Wrestling (AEW), where he serves as the Vice President of Show and Creative Coordination, and also makes appearances in its sister promotion Ring of Honor (ROH), where he works as an in-ring competitor. He is also the owner 1 Fall Wrestling (1FW), an independent professional wrestling promotion based in McDonough, Georgia.

He is the co-owner and a trainer at The Nightmare Factory (formerly known as One Fall Power Factory), a professional wrestling training facility, alongside Cody Rhodes and Glacier of the Nightmare Family. During his career he has worked with several independent promotions, most notably having sporadic appearances in Ring of Honor (ROH), as well as four matches with WWE. He also was the focus of a documentary about his tryout for the WWE named The Wrestler: A Q.T. Marshall Story, which has won Best Documentary at the 2017 San Diego Comic-Con Film Festival. Marshall is also previously made appearances for Lucha Libre AAA Worldwide (AAA), where he is a former one-time AAA Latin American Champion.

== Professional wrestling career ==
=== Early career (2004–2012) ===
Marshall was trained at the Monster Factory before making his debut in 2004.

=== Ring of Honor (2012–2016, 2025–) ===
After sporadic appearances for Ring of Honor, Marshall gained an ROH contract by defeating Matt Taven, Antonio Thomas, and Vinny Marseglia in a Four Corner Survival Match at Boiling Point 2012. Marshall was often paired with R.D. Evans as his manager or tag team partner as a comedy duo known as Marshall Law. Marshall made his last regular appearance for ROH in March 2016, teaming with Punisher Martinez to defeat Leon St. Giovanni and Shaheem Ali in a dark match.

=== WWE (2013–2017) ===
Prior to his WWE debut, Cuellari made his appearance for the WWE in 2011 during Extreme Rules with Cody Rhodes in his "undashing" gimmick handing out paper bags to the fans.

Marshall made his NXT debut (though not signed to a contract) on September 18, 2013, under the name Michael Q. Laurie, a play on his birth name, losing to Aiden English. On January 30, 2014, Marshall returned using his real name, teaming with John Icarino and losing to The Ascension. Marshall made another NXT appearance in 2016, losing to Baron Corbin in just over a minute. His last appearance came on March 29, 2017, going under the name Mike Marshall and teaming with Jonathan Ortagun to lose against the team of Otis Dozovic and Tucker Knight.

=== Ring of Honor (2017–2018) ===
Marshall returned to ROH at in July 2017, joining Ian Riccaboni and Colt Cabana on commentary during a match between Shane Taylor and Josh Woods. After the bout, Taylor attacked Woods at the behest of Marshall, who was revealed to be paying Taylor to do so. At the August 26 TV tapings which aired in syndication over the weekend of September 23–24, Woods obtained his revenge by defeating Marshall in a regular match via submission to an ankle bar. Marshall reappeared at the February 10, 2018, TV tapings, which broadcast on the weekend of March 10, at Center Stage in Atlanta, Georgia, participating in a Battle Royal qualifier for an opportunity at the ROH World Television Championship, during which he would accidentally strike Taylor, by whom he would then be promptly eliminated.

=== All Elite Wrestling (2019–2023) ===
In 2019, Marshall joined All Elite Wrestling (AEW) as a wrestler and associate producer. He made his AEW in-ring debut teaming with Peter Avalon on AEW Dark, losing to Dustin Rhodes and Sonny Kiss. He later debuted on the main show, AEW Dynamite, teaming with Alex Reynolds and John Silver, losing to Trent, Chuck Taylor and Orange Cassidy. From December 2019 to March 2021, Marshell joined Cody Rhodes' stable The Nightmare Family. He usually teamed with Dustin Rhodes as "The Natural Nightmares". In May 2020, Marshall began a romantic storyline with Allie, as she accompanied him to the ring for his match to Brandi Rhodes and Dustin Rhodes’s behest.

On the March 31 edition of Dynamite, Marshall turned heel after attacking the Nightmare Family. He was joined by Anthony Ogogo, Nick Comoroto and Aaron Solo forming a splinter group called The Factory. At AEW Blood and Guts, Marshall lost to Cody Rhodes. In the spring of 2023, Marshall began doing segments on Dynamite and Rampage called "QTV", where he would in the style of Harvey Levin on TMZ spread gossip about other AEW wrestlers. Joining him in this new stable would be Solo, Powerhouse Hobbs, Harley Cameron, and Johnny TV. In August, Marshall planned to leave AEW, but signed an extension until end of 2023, expecting to increase his work as a wrestler. On November 27, 2023, Marshall announced that he will be resigning from AEW at the end of 2023.

=== Independent circuit (2021–present) ===
On August 7, 2021, Marshall debuted at CCW Bash At The Brew 7 of Coastal Championship Wrestling and defeated Cha Cha Charlie.

=== Lucha Libre AAA Worldwide (2023) ===
Q.T. Marshall made his debut at Triplemanía XXXI: Tijuana, defeating Pentagón Jr. in a Ambulance match. He returned at Triplemanía XXXI: Mexico City to win the AAA Latin American Championship in a Four-way match against Pentagón Jr., Dralístico, and Texano Jr. Marshall would lose the championship to Octagón Jr at Guerra de Titanes.

=== Return to AEW (2024–present) ===
On February 14, 2024, it was reported by Sean Ross Sapp of Fightful that Marshall would be returning to AEW and resuming his previous Vice President of Show and Creative Coordination role. As part of the deal Marshall would not be an on-screen performer for AEW, but, Marshall is free to perform for other wrestling promotions, with the exception of WWE. However on October 28, it was announced that Marshall would make his AEW in-ring return, where he will face "Big Boom!" AJ at Full Gear Zero Hour on November 23. At the event on November 23, Marshall was defeated.

== Filmography ==
=== Television ===
Year	Title	Role	Notes
2021	Rhodes To The Top	Himself	

=== Film ===
Year	Title	Role	Notes
2018	Rampage – Big Meets Bigger	FBI Agent	

== Championships and accomplishments ==
- Big Time Wrestling
  - BTW World Championship (1 time)
- Coastal Championship Wrestling
  - CCW World Heavyweight Championship (1 time)
  - King of the Territory (2023)
- Georgia Premier Wrestling
  - GPW Southern States Championship (2 times)
- Jersey Championship Wrestling
  - JCW Championship (1 time)
- IWA Puerto Rico
  - IWA Puerto Rico Heavyweight Championship (1 time)
- Lucha Libre AAA Worldwide
  - AAA Latin American Championship (1 time)
- Lariato Pro Wrestling Guild
  - Lariato Pro Championship (1 time)
- Monster Factory Pro Wrestling
  - MFPW Heavyweight Championship (1 time)
  - MFPW Tag Team Championship (1 time) – with Punishment Martinez
- Pro Wrestling Illustrated
  - Ranked No. 129 of the top 500 singles wrestlers in the PWI 500 in 2021
- Southern Championship Wrestling (Florida)
  - SCW Florida Heavyweight Championship (3 times)
