= Lewis Earle =

American politician

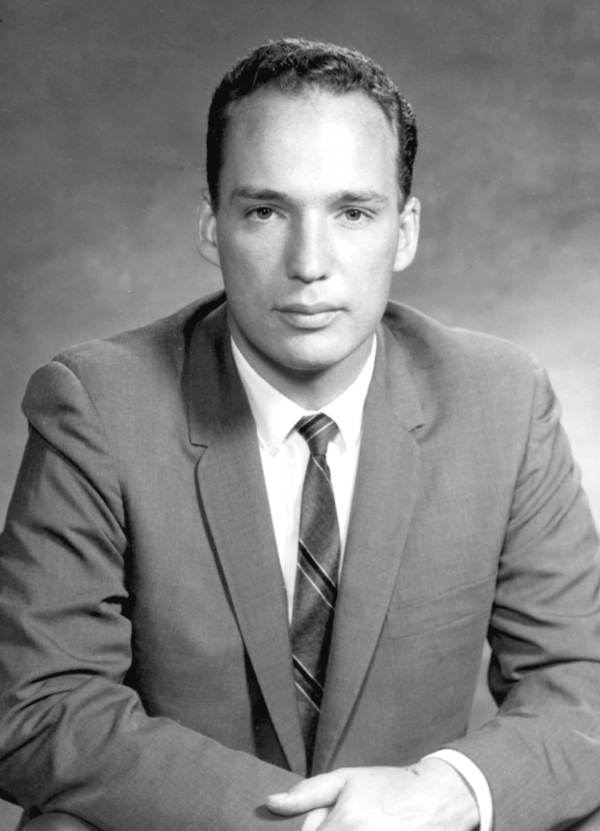
- Earle in 1969

Member of the Florida House of Representatives from the 43rd district
- In office 1968–1974

Personal details
- Born: August 22, 1933 (age 92) Gibbstown, New Jersey
- Party: Republican
- Occupation: dentist

Lewis S. "Lew" Earle (born August 22, 1933) is an American politician and dentist in the state of Florida.

Earle was born in the Gibbstown section of Greenwich Township, Gloucester County, New Jersey, and moved to Florida in 1947. He attended the University of Florida and dentistry school at Emory University. He served in the Florida House of Representatives from 1968 to 1974 for district 43. He is a member of the Republican Party.
