= C. A. Nothnagle Log House =

Historic house in New Jersey

- Nothnagle, C. A., Log House
- U.S. National Register of Historic Places
- New Jersey Register of Historic Places
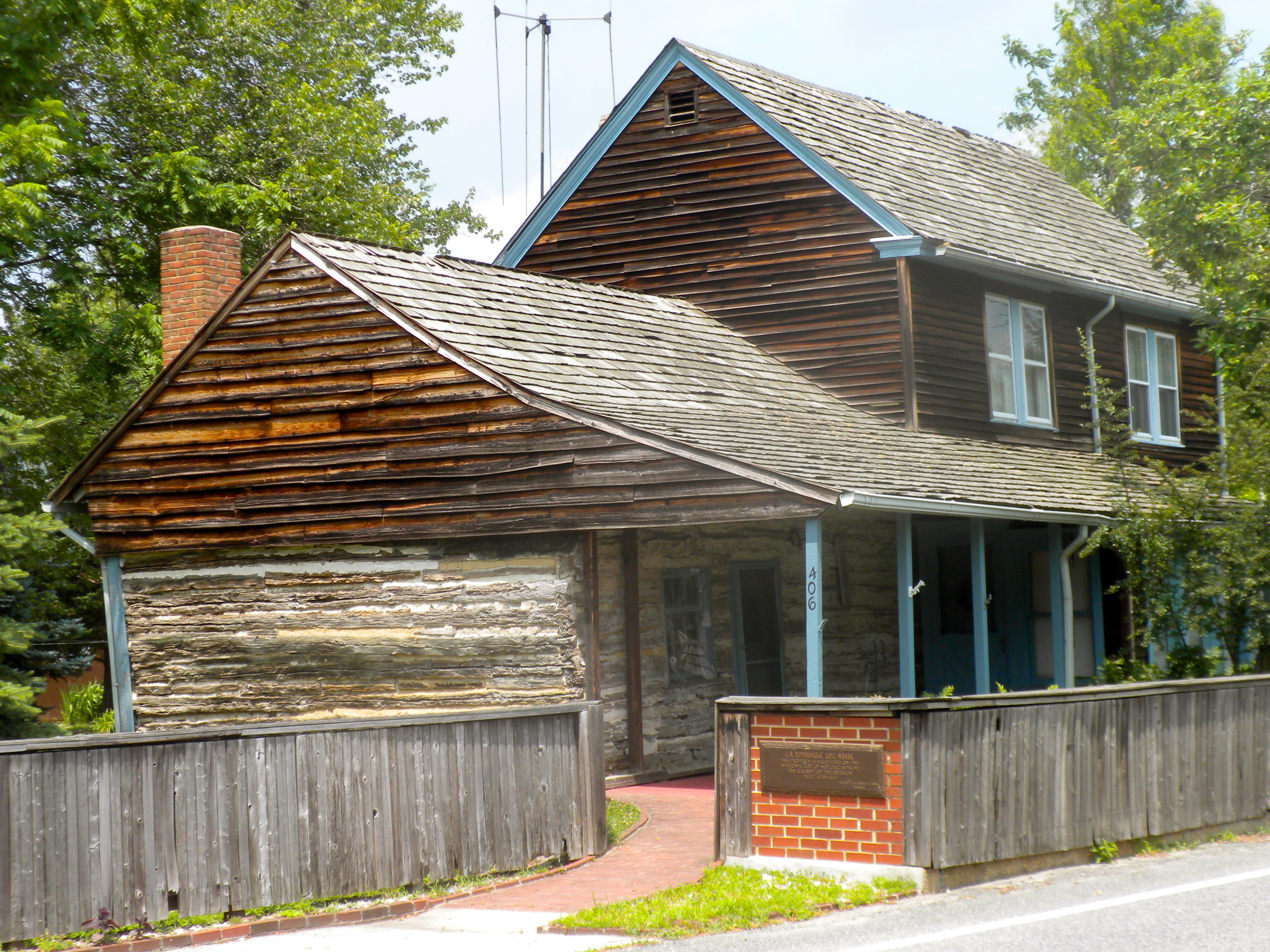

- Location within Gloucester County, New Jersey Location within New Jersey Location within the United States
- Location: Swedesboro-Paulsboro Road, Gibbstown, New Jersey
- Coordinates: 39.8178°N 75.2657°W
- Area: 1.5 acres (0.61 ha)
- Built: some parts 1638–1643; the remainder completed by 1685
- NRHP reference No.: 76001153
- NJRHP No.: 1385

Significant dates
- Added to NRHP: April 23, 1976
- Designated NJRHP: January 14, 1972

C. A. Nothnagle Log House, also known as Braman-Nothnagle Log House, is a historic house on Swedesboro-Paulsboro Road in Gibbstown, New Jersey and is one of the oldest log houses in the United States.

The older part of the house was built sometime between 1638 and 1643 by Finnish settlers in the colony of New Sweden, and Nordic ironware from the 1590s is still extant around the fireplace. The fireplace was probably built of bricks brought to America as ship's ballast.

The original cabin measures 16 by 22 feet, which indicates that the builders were relatively well off; an average-sized dwelling of the period was 12 by 12 feet. It is built of oak logs, and two logs were removable to provide ventilation in the summer. The logs were double dovetailed to provide a close fit, and gravel was pounded between the chinks in the logs. No nails were used in the original construction; hardwood pegs were used as fasteners. There is no ridgepole in the roof. People lived in this part of the house until 1918.

A large addition was constructed in the early 18th century. A wooden floor was built over the original dirt floor around 1730. The house was added to the National Register of Historic Places in 1976 and is still privately owned. Until its 2024 sale, the building was open for tours by appointment through owner Doris Rink, who resided in the adjoining structure.

Doris Rink sold the Log Cabin and adjoining property in 2024 to a real estate developer named Stephen Laszczyk who owns many properties in the area. Rink had stated, "I want to get it into the hands of someone who is capable and loving and willing enough to put as much works into it as my husband and I have over the years," but efforts to sell to community organizations were unsuccessful. The building was subsequently remodeled.

== See also ==
- List of the oldest buildings in New Jersey
- List of the oldest buildings in the United States
- National Register of Historic Places listings in Gloucester County, New Jersey
