= Alex Silvestro =

American football player (born 1988)

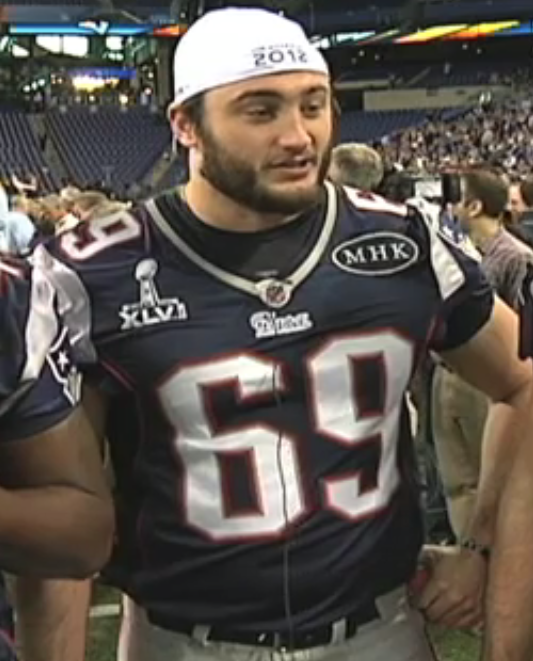
- Silvestro at Super Bowl XLVI media day

No. 69
- Position: Defensive end

Personal information
- Born: November 15, 1988 (age 37); Gibbstown, New Jersey, U.S.
- Listed height: 6 ft 3 in (1.91 m)
- Listed weight: 267 lb (121 kg)

Career information
- High school: Paulsboro (Paulsboro, New Jersey)
- College: Rutgers
- NFL draft: 2011: undrafted

Career history
- New England Patriots (2011); Baltimore Ravens (2012)*
- * Offseason or practice squad member only

Awards and highlights
- Super Bowl champion (XLVII)

Career NFL statistics
- Games played: 1
- Stats at Pro Football Reference

Alexander Allen Silvestro (born November 15, 1988) is an American former professional football player who was a defensive end in the National Football League (NFL). He played college football for the Rutgers Scarlet Knights.

Prior to Rutgers, Silvestro played for Paulsboro High School in Paulsboro, New Jersey.

== Professional career ==
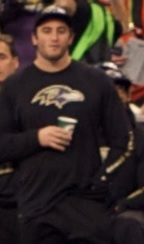
Alex Silvestro

=== New England Patriots ===
As a defensive end, he was signed by the New England Patriots as an undrafted free agent in 2011. On February 4, 2012, he was called up to replace a former college teammate, Tiquan Underwood, on the active roster of the New England Patriots, one day before Super Bowl XLVI, though he didn't appear in the game. During the 2012 OTAs and minicamp, Silvestro was forced into duty at tight end due to a shortage at that position of the roster.

=== Baltimore Ravens ===
In November 2012, he was signed by the Baltimore Ravens to the practice squad. On August 30, 2013, he was released by the Ravens.
