= Nightmare Family =

Stable
- Members: See below
- Name: Nightmare Family
- Debut: September 1, 2018
- Disbanded: February 15, 2022
- Years active: 2018–2022

The Nightmare Family was a professional wrestling stable that performed on the independent circuit and in All Elite Wrestling (AEW). The group's name derives from "The American Nightmare", the nickname of the stable's leader Cody Rhodes. He described the group as "an ensemble of focused individuals, some who train at the Nightmare Factory (AEW's training facility) together, who just have a singular focus over the sport". In addition to Cody, his brother Dustin Rhodes was a member of the stable; both are the sons of the late Dusty Rhodes.

== History ==
=== Background ===
Prior to the launch of All Elite Wrestling (AEW), Cody Rhodes and his brother Dustin Rhodes previously wrestled in WWE. On June 21, 2018, Cody launched a YouTube channel titled Nightmare Family, showcasing behind-the-scenes videos from his professional wrestling career.

=== All In and All Elite Wrestling ===
Members of the Nightmare Family first appeared together on September 1, 2018 at the independently-produced All In event.

On January 1, 2019, Cody and Brandi Rhodes joined All Elite Wrestling (AEW), a new professional wrestling promotion founded by Shahid Khan and Tony Khan. Cody and Brandi signed contracts as on-screen talent and also as Executive Vice President and Chief Brand Officer respectively. On April 20, Cody's opponent for AEW's inaugural event Double or Nothing was revealed as his brother Dustin Rhodes. Cody defeated Dustin at Double or Nothing, and the match received a 5 star rating from Dave Meltzer of Wrestling Observer Newsletter. After the match, Cody made a plea to Dustin to reunite as a tag team to face The Young Bucks at Fight for the Fallen. Dustin accepted, reuniting The Rhodes Brothers for the first time in over four years.

On December 30, 2019, Arn Anderson signed a contract with AEW, serving as Cody's on-screen personal advisor and head coach. On January 15, 2020 at Bash at the Beach, Diamond Dallas Page teamed with Q. T. Marshall and Dustin Rhodes for his first match since 2016.

On October 30, 2020, Gunn Club (Austin, and Billy) and Lee Johnson joined the group. On February 8, 2021, Aaron Solow and Nick Comoroto joined the group.

On the March 31, 2021 edition of AEW Dynamite, Cody Rhodes and Q. T. Marshall fought in an unsanctioned Exhibition match with Arn Anderson serving as the referee. After about 7 minutes of in-ring action, a frustrated Q.T. attacked Anderson and left the ring, allowing Aaron Solow and Nick Comoroto, as well as Nightmare Factory trainee Anthony Ogogo, to attack Cody from behind. Q.T. continued to lead the group in a brutal beatdown of Cody and the rest of the Nightmare Family, ending his (as well as Solow and Comoroto's) relationship with the group.

After months of inactivity, Cody Rhodes departed AEW on February 15, 2022, effectively disbanding the stable.

== Members ==
*	Founding member(s)
L	Leader(s)

=== Former ===
==== Full-time ====
Member	Joined	Left
Dustin Rhodes	August 3, 2019	February 15, 2022 (Note: Dustin never officially left the stable. This date reflects the day his brother Cody departed AEW. He was no longer seen with other Nightmare Family members after this date.)
Arn Anderson	December 30, 2019	May 10, 2022 (Note: The Nightmare Family stable never officially disbanded. This date indicates the last appearance the group made together on AEW Dark.)
Lee Johnson	October 30, 2020	May 10, 2022
Brock Anderson	June 11, 2021	May 10, 2022
Cody Rhodes	September 1, 2018	February 15, 2022
Brandi Rhodes	September 1, 2018	February 15, 2022
MJF	August 31, 2019	November 9, 2019
Allie	June 16, 2020	October 27, 2020
Q. T. Marshall	January 15, 2020	March 31, 2021
Aaron Solow	February 8, 2021	March 31, 2021
Nick Comoroto	February 8, 2021	March 31, 2021
Austin Gunn	October 30, 2020	September 1, 2021
Billy Gunn	October 30, 2020	September 1, 2021
Colten Gunn	November 17, 2020 (Note: Colten was never officially announced as a member himself. This date indicates his first televised AEW match, which occurred after the announcement of his fellow Gunn Club members (father Billy and brother Austin) joining the Nightmare Family.)	September 1, 2021

==== Part-time ====
Member	Joined	Last appearance
Diamond Dallas Page	September 1, 2019	January 15, 2020

== Sub-groups ==
Affiliate	Members	Tenure	Type
The Brotherhood	Cody Rhodes; Dustin Rhodes	2019–2022	Tag team
Gunn Club	Austin Gunn; Billy Gunn; Colten Gunn	2020–2021	Trio

== Other media ==
Nightmare Family

YouTube information
- Channel: Nightmare Family
- Years active: 2016–present
- Genre: Entertainment
- Subscribers: 153 thousand
- Views: 9.4 million
- Last updated: July 24, 2022

The Nightmare Family maintains a YouTube channel, which currently hosts videos of matches that take place at the Nightmare Factory training facility. Cody Rhodes, Q. T. Marshall, and Glacier are co-owners and coaches of the Nightmare Factory. Prior to adopting a Nightmare Family-inspired name, the training facility was known as the Power Factory.

== Championships and accomplishments ==
- All Elite Wrestling
  - AEW TNT Championship (3 times) – Cody
  - Dynamite Award (1 time)
    - Best Moment on the Mic (2021) – Cody accepting Dog Collar match on AEW Dynamite (September 30)
- CBS Sports
  - Promo of the Year (2019) – Cody "Silver spoon" promo on AEW Dynamite (November 7)
- Pro Wrestling Illustrated
  - Match of the Year (2019) – Cody vs. Dustin at Double or Nothing
  - Ranked Cody No. 7 of the top 500 singles wrestlers in the PWI 500 in 2020
  - Ranked Dustin No. 137 of the top 500 singles wrestlers in the PWI 500 in 2020
  - Ranked Marshall No. 468 of the top 500 singles wrestlers in the PWI 500 in 2020
  - Ranked Brandi No. 50 of the top 100 female wrestlers in the PWI Female 100 in 2019
