= Gibbstown, New Jersey =

Place in Gloucester County, New Jersey, United States

- Census-designated place
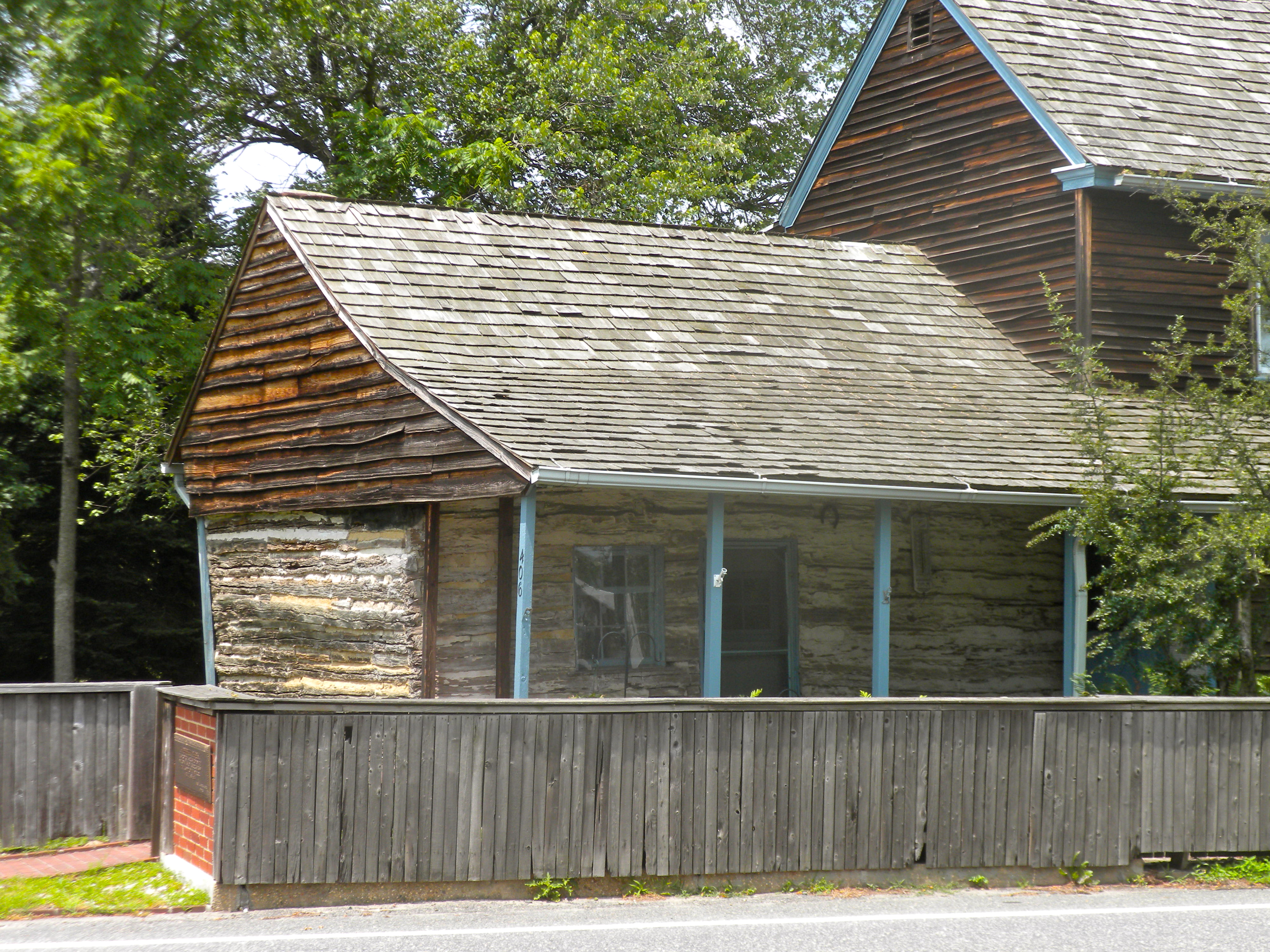
- C. A. Nothnagle Log House

- Map of Gibbstown highlighted within Gloucester County. Right: Location of Gloucester County in New Jersey.

- Location in Gloucester County Location in New Jersey Location in the United States
- Coordinates: 39.82454°N 75.278082°W
- Country: United States
- State: New Jersey
- County: Gloucester
- Township: Greenwich

Area
  - Total: 1.64 sq mi (4.25 km^{2})
  - Land: 1.64 sq mi (4.25 km^{2})
  - Water: 0 sq mi (0.00 km^{2}) 0.00%
- Elevation: 13 ft (4 m)

Population (2020)
  - Total: 3,822
  - Density: 2,326.6/sq mi (898.32/km^{2})
- Time zone: UTC−05:00 (Eastern (EST))
  - Summer (DST): UTC−04:00 (EDT)
- ZIP Code: 08027
- Area code: 856
- FIPS code: 34-26100
- GNIS feature ID: 02389839

Gibbstown is an unincorporated community and census-designated place (CDP) located within Greenwich Township, in Gloucester County, in the U.S. state of New Jersey. As of the 2020 census, Gibbstown had a population of 3,822. Gibbstown is the location of C. A. Nothnagle Log House, purportedly the oldest house in New Jersey and the oldest surviving log house in the U.S., dating to around 1638.

== Geography ==
According to the U.S. Census Bureau, Gibbstown had a total area of 1.642 square miles (4.25 km^{2}), all of which was land.

The Port of Paulsboro is located on the Delaware River and Mantua Creek in and around Paulsboro. Traditionally one of the nation's busiest for marine transfer operations of petroleum products, including the Paulsboro Refinery, which is mostly located in Gibbstown. The port is being redeveloped as an adaptable omniport able to handle a diversity of bulk, break bulk cargo and shipping containers. Studies completed in 2012 concluded that the port is well suited to become a center for the manufacture, assembly, and transport of wind turbines and platforms the development of Atlantic Wind Connection

== Demographics ==
Historical population
| Census | Pop. | Note | %± |
|---|---|---|---|
| 1950 | 2,546 | | — |
| 1960 | 2,820 | | 10.8% |
| 1990 | 3,902 | | — |
| 2000 | 3,758 | | −3.7% |
| 2010 | 3,739 | | −0.5% |
| 2020 | 3,822 | | 2.2% |
Population sources: 1950 1960 1970; 1980 1990 2000; 2010 2020

Gibbstown appeared as an unincorporated community in the 1950 U.S. census and the 1960 U.S. census. It did not appear in subsequent censuses until it was listed as a census designated place in the 1990 U.S. census.

=== Racial and ethnic composition ===
Gibbstown CDP, New Jersey – Racial and ethnic composition Note: the US Census treats Hispanic/Latino as an ethnic category. This table excludes Latinos from the racial categories and assigns them to a separate category. Hispanics/Latinos may be of any race.
| Race / Ethnicity (NH = Non-Hispanic) | Pop 2000 | Pop 2010 | Pop 2020 | % 2000 | % 2010 | % 2020 |
|---|---|---|---|---|---|---|
| White alone (NH) | 3,590 | 3,536 | 3,322 | 95.53% | 94.57% | 86.92% |
| Black or African American alone (NH) | 41 | 64 | 104 | 1.09% | 1.71% | 2.72% |
| Native American or Alaska Native alone (NH) | 4 | 2 | 2 | 0.11% | 0.05% | 0.05% |
| Asian alone (NH) | 26 | 16 | 29 | 0.69% | 0.43% | 0.76% |
| Native Hawaiian or Pacific Islander alone (NH) | 1 | 0 | 0 | 0.03% | 0.00% | 0.00% |
| Other race alone (NH) | 2 | 0 | 8 | 0.05% | 0.00% | 0.21% |
| Mixed race or Multiracial (NH) | 37 | 46 | 187 | 0.98% | 1.23% | 4.89% |
| Hispanic or Latino (any race) | 57 | 75 | 170 | 1.52% | 2.01% | 4.45% |
| Total | 3,758 | 3,739 | 3,822 | 100.00% | 100.00% | 100.00% |

=== 2020 census ===
As of the 2020 census, Gibbstown had a population of 3,822. The median age was 43.5 years. 19.7% of residents were under the age of 18 and 20.7% were 65 years of age or older. For every 100 females, there were 100.6 males, and for every 100 females age 18 and over, there were 98.0 males.

98.6% of residents lived in urban areas, while 1.4% lived in rural areas.

There were 1,493 households, of which 29.0% had children under the age of 18 living in them. Of all households, 50.8% were married-couple households, 18.5% were households with a male householder and no spouse or partner present, and 23.0% were households with a female householder and no spouse or partner present. About 25.1% of all households were made up of individuals, and 13.7% had someone living alone who was 65 years of age or older.

There were 1,605 housing units, of which 7.0% were vacant. The homeowner vacancy rate was 1.0% and the rental vacancy rate was 10.9%.

=== 2010 census ===
The 2010 United States census counted 3,739 people, 1,472 households, and 1,039 families in the CDP. The population density was 2,277.0 people per square mile (879.2 people/km^{2}). There were 1,551 housing units at an average density of 944.5 units per square mile (364.7 units/km^{2}). The racial makeup was 95.91% (3,586) White, 1.77% (66) Black or African American, 0.05% (2) Native American, 0.43% (16) Asian, 0.00% (0) Pacific Islander, 0.32% (12) from other races, and 1.52% (57) from two or more races. Hispanic or Latino of any race were 2.01% (75) of the population.

Of the 1,472 households, 26.9% had children under the age of 18; 54.1% were married couples living together; 11.5% had a female householder with no husband present and 29.4% were non-families. Of all households, 23.5% were made up of individuals and 10.8% had someone living alone who was 65 years of age or older. The average household size was 2.54 and the average family size was 3.00.

21.3% of the population were under the age of 18, 6.4% from 18 to 24, 25.8% from 25 to 44, 30.0% from 45 to 64, and 16.6% who were 65 years of age or older. The median age was 42.9 years. For every 100 females, the population had 98.9 males. For every 100 females ages 18 and older there were 94.8 males.

=== 2000 census ===
As of the 2000 U.S. census there were 3,758 people, 1,453 households, and 1,060 families living in the CDP. The population density was 890.2 people/km^{2} (2,306 people/mi^{2}). There were 1,513 housing units at an average density of 358.4 units/km^{2} (928 units/mi^{2}). The racial makeup of the CDP was 96.65% White, 1.09% African American, 0.11% Native American, 0.69% Asian, 0.03% Pacific Islander, 0.32% from other races, and 1.12% from two or more races. Hispanic or Latino of any race were 1.52% of the population.

There were 1,453 households, out of which 31.7% had children under the age of 18 living with them, 57.1% were married couples living together, 11.2% had a female householder with no husband present, and 27.0% were non-families. 23.3% of all households were made up of individuals, and 13.3% had someone living alone who was 65 years of age or older. The average household size was 2.58 and the average family size was 3.05.

In the CDP, the population was spread out, with 23.0% under the age of 18, 7.6% from 18 to 24, 28.1% from 25 to 44, 23.6% from 45 to 64, and 17.7% who were 65 years of age or older. The median age was 40 years. For every 100 females, there were 95.9 males. For every 100 females age 18 and over, there were 92.2 males.

The median income for a household in the CDP was $50,444, and the median income for a family was $59,833. Males had a median income of $41,200 versus $31,225 for females. The per capita income for the CDP was $23,931. About 1.2% of families and 3.2% of the population were below the poverty line, including 3.4% of those under age 18 and 4.9% of those age 65 or over.

== Education ==
Greenwich Township School District operates the area public schools except high school, which is operated by Paulsboro Public Schools.

Guardian Angels Regional School is a K-8 school that operates under the auspices of the Roman Catholic Diocese of Camden. Its PreK-3 campus is in Gibbstown while its 4-8 campus is in Paulsboro.

== Notable people ==
People who were born in, residents of, or otherwise closely associated with Gibbstown include:

- Sylvia Earle (born 1935), marine biologist, oceanographer and explorer.
- Alex Silvestro (born 1988), former football tight end / defensive end who played in the NFL for the Baltimore Ravens and New England Patriots.
