= Billingsport, New Jersey =

Populated place in Gloucester County, New Jersey, US

- Unincorporated community
- Billingsport's location in Gloucester County (Inset: Gloucester County in New Jersey) Billingsport (New Jersey) Billingsport (the United States)
- Coordinates: 39°50′54″N 75°14′31″W
- Country: United States
- State: New Jersey
- County: Gloucester
- Borough: Paulsboro
- Elevation: 33 ft (10 m)
- Time zone: UTC−05:00 (Eastern (EST))
  - Summer (DST): UTC−04:00 (EDT)
- Area code: 856
- GNIS feature ID: 874765

Billingsport is an unincorporated community within Paulsboro, in Gloucester County, in the U.S. state of New Jersey. The community is located on the Delaware River. The area dates back to 1677, when it was originally known as Byllings Port, named for Edward Byllings, a Quaker of West Jersey.

== See also ==
- Fort Billingsport
