= Paulsboro, New Jersey =

Borough in Gloucester County, New Jersey, US

- Borough
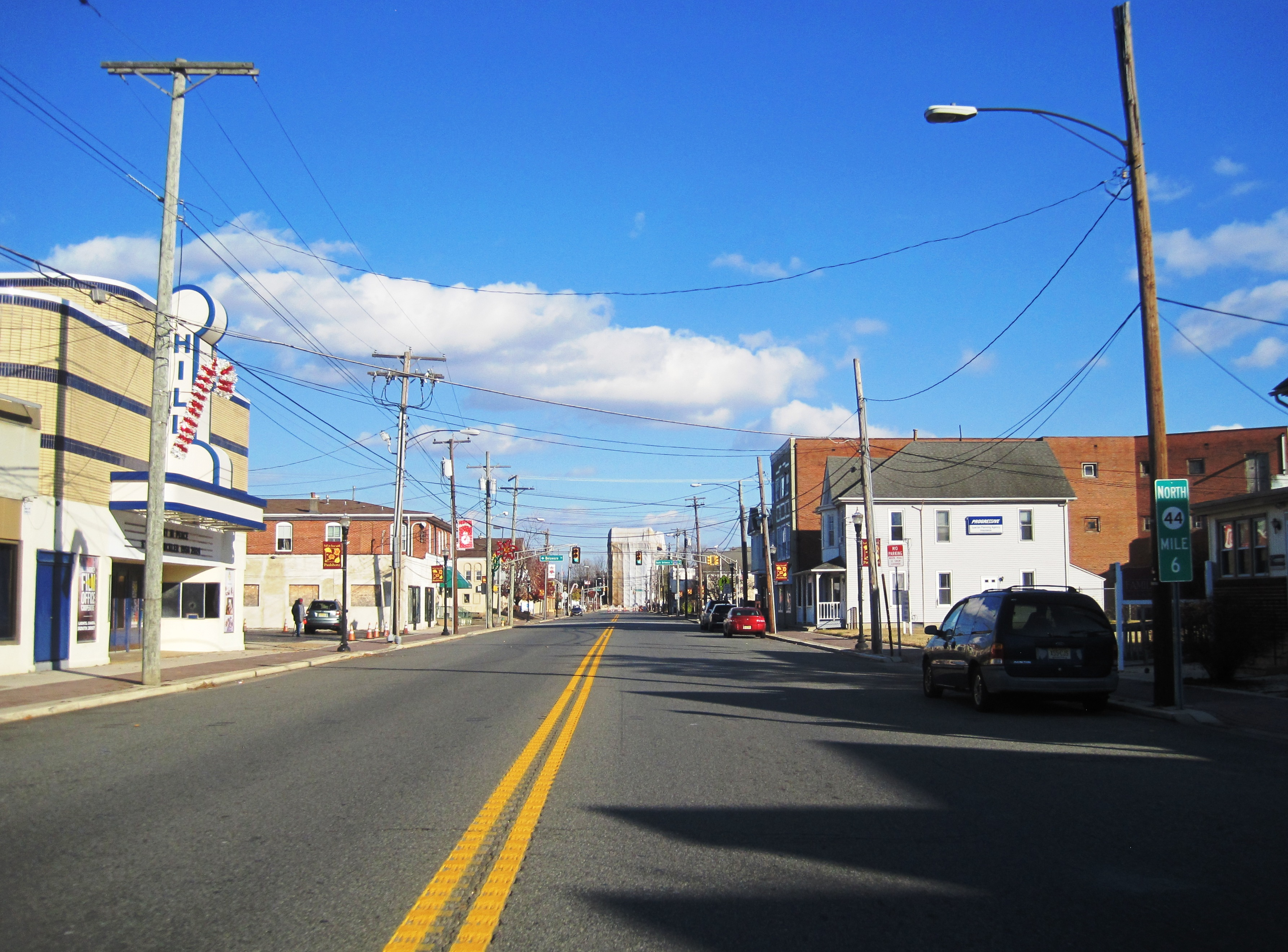
- Downtown Paulsboro along Route 44 (Broad Street)

- Seal

- Location of Paulsboro in Gloucester County highlighted in red (left). Inset map: Location of Gloucester County in New Jersey highlighted in orange (right).

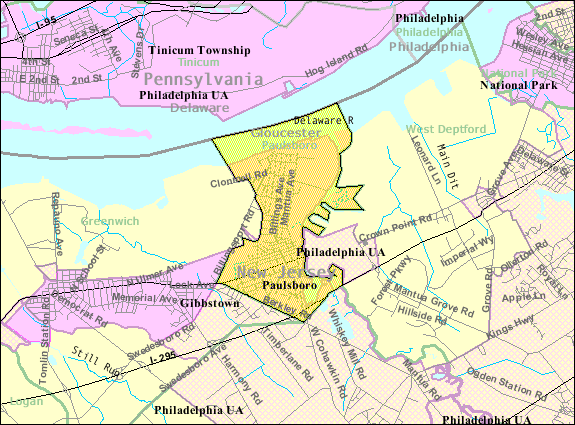
- Census Bureau map of Paulsboro, New Jersey

- Location in Gloucester County Location in New Jersey Location in the United States
- Coordinates: 39.839975°N 75.23996°W
- Country: United States
- State: New Jersey
- County: Gloucester
- Incorporated: March 2, 1904
- Named for: Samuel Phillip Paul

Government
  - Type: Borough
  - Body: Borough Council
  - Mayor: John Giovannitti (D, term ends December 31, 2027)
  - Administrator: Vernon Marino
  - Municipal clerk: Elsie Tedeski (acting)

Area
  - Total: 2.63 sq mi (6.81 km^{2})
  - Land: 1.92 sq mi (4.98 km^{2})
  - Water: 0.71 sq mi (1.83 km^{2}) 26.81%
  - Rank: 367th of 565 in state 16th of 24 in county
- Elevation: 20 ft (6.1 m)

Population (2020)
  - Total: 6,196
  - Estimate (2023): 6,267
  - Rank: 338th of 565 in state 14th of 24 in county
  - Density: 3,220.4/sq mi (1,243.4/km^{2})
  - Rank: 207th of 565 in state 5th of 24 in county
- Time zone: UTC−05:00 (Eastern (EST))
  - Summer (DST): UTC−04:00 (Eastern (EDT))
- ZIP Code: 08066
- Area code: 856 exchanges: 224, 423, 467, 599
- FIPS code: 3401557150
- GNIS feature ID: 0885344
- Website: www.paulsboronj.org

Paulsboro is a borough situated on the banks of the Delaware River in Gloucester County, in the U.S. state of New Jersey, within the Philadelphia metropolitan area. As of the 2020 United States census, the borough's population was 6,196, an increase of 99 (+1.6%) from the 6,097 recorded at the 2010 census, which in turn had reflected a decline of 63 (−1.0%) from the 6,160 counted in the 2000 census. Paulsboro and surrounding Gloucester County constitute part of South Jersey.

Paulsboro was formed as a borough by an act of the New Jersey Legislature on March 2, 1904, from portions of Greenwich Township. It was named for Samuel Phillip Paul, son of a settler.

== History ==
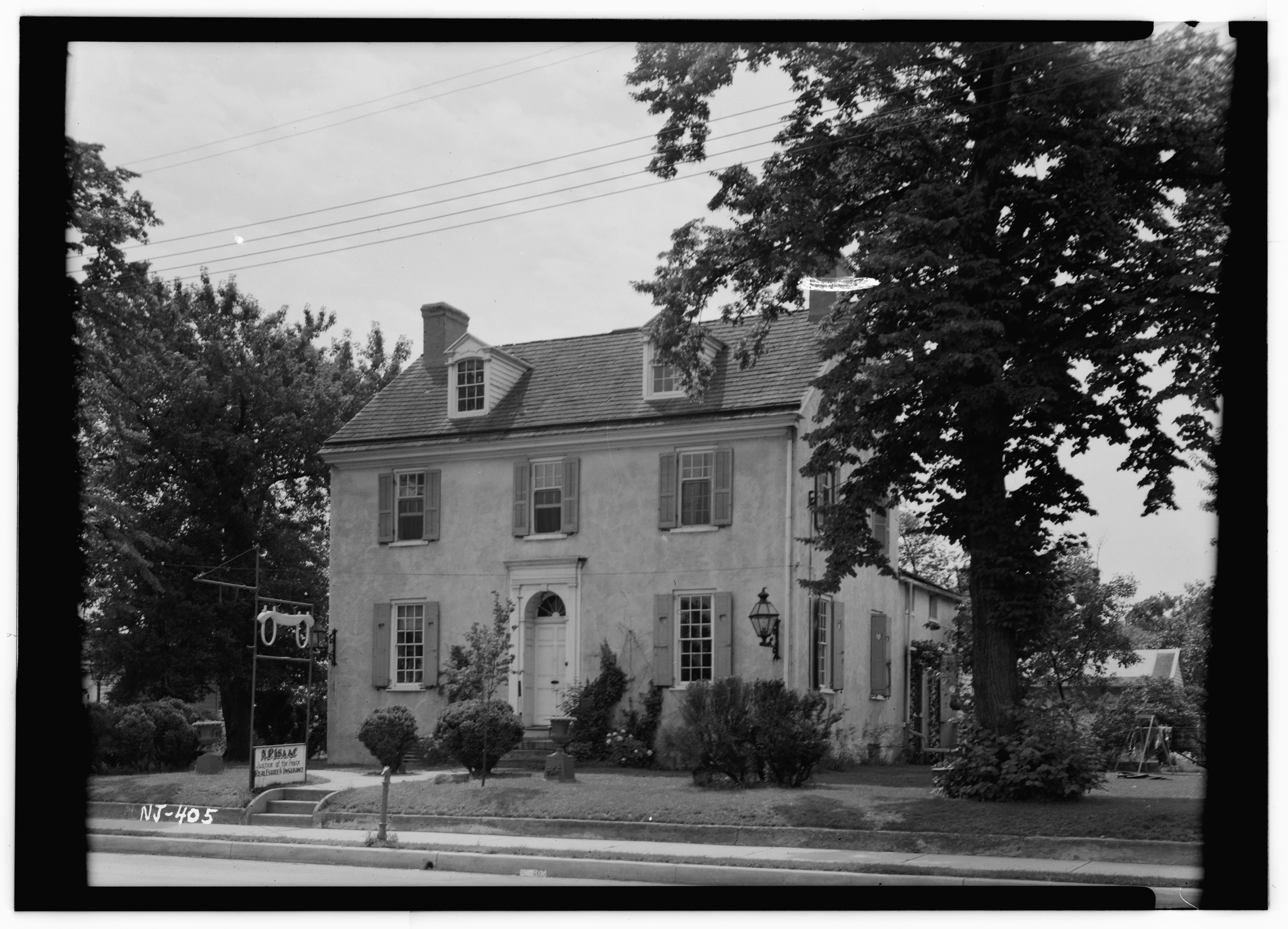
Historic Paul House

=== 18th century ===
Paulsboro is the home of Fort Billingsport, the first land purchase made by the United States, acquired on July 5, 1776, the day after the signing of the Declaration of Independence.

=== 19th century ===
Samuel P. Paul House, home of the borough’s namesake, was constructed in 1810.

Paulsboro is the location of the Tinicum Island Rear Range Light house, first lit on the night of December 31, 1880.

=== 20th century ===
In 1997, a local citizens' group was established with the purpose of providing tours and public access to the structure. The lighthouse is one of New Jersey's few publicly accessible aids to navigation and is the centerpiece of Paulsboro's cultural revitalization.

The East Jefferson Street Railroad Bridge over Mantua Creek was built in 1917 and rebuilt in 1940 for the Pennsylvania-Reading Seashore Lines (PRSL). It is now part of Conrail's Penns Grove Secondary.

=== 21st century ===
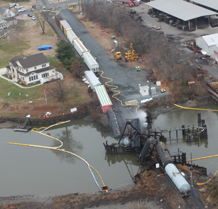
Aerial view of 2012 derailment

On November 30, 2012, the East Jefferson Street Railroad Bridge buckled, causing seven cars of a freight train to derail. One of the four tanker cars that fell into the creek was punctured, leaking thousands of gallons of vinyl chloride. Homes in the borough had to be evacuated and dozens of people went to hospitals as a precautionary measure due to exposure to the chemicals. Some residents in the area have filed suit against Conrail and CSX in Pennsylvania State Court having "complained about respiratory and bronchial related illnesses, headaches, eye and skin irritations and multiple other symptoms."

In March 2013, Conrail announced that the bridge would be replaced with an expected September 2014 operational date. Normally, between March 1 and November 30 the bridge is left in the open position for maritime traffic and closed when trains approach. It will remain locked in the closed position until the bridge is replaced. In September 2013, another less serious derailment took place along the border of Gibbstown (in Greenwich Township) and Paulsboro, with one car leaving the tracks on a train consisting mostly of empty tanker cars.

== Geography ==
According to the U.S. Census Bureau, the borough had a total area of 2.63 square miles (6.81 km^{2}), including 1.92 square miles (4.98 km^{2}) of land and 0.71 square miles (1.83 km^{2}) of water (26.81%).

Unincorporated communities, localities and place names located partially or completely in the borough include Billingsport.

Paulsboro borders the Gloucester County municipalities of East Greenwich Township, Greenwich Township, and West Deptford Township. It also borders the Delaware River.

== Demographics ==
Historical population
Census	Pop.	Note	%±
1880	750		—
1890	1,131		50.8%
1910	2,121		—
1920	4,352		105.2%
1930	7,121		63.6%
1940	7,011		−1.5%
1950	7,842		11.9%
1960	8,121		3.6%
1970	8,084		−0.5%
1980	6,944		−14.1%
1990	6,577		−5.3%
2000	6,160		−6.3%
2010	6,097		−1.0%
2020	6,196		1.6%
2023 (est.)	6,267	▲	1.1%
Population sources: 1880–1890; 1910–2000 1910–1920 1910; 1910–1930 1940–2000; 2000 2010 2020

=== 2020 census ===
As of the 2020 census, Paulsboro had a population of 6,196. The median age was 35.2 years. 26.8% of residents were under the age of 18 and 12.1% of residents were 65 years of age or older. For every 100 females there were 89.0 males, and for every 100 females age 18 and over there were 84.4 males age 18 and over.

100.0% of residents lived in urban areas, while 0.0% lived in rural areas.

There were 2,315 households in Paulsboro, of which 36.1% had children under the age of 18 living in them. Of all households, 29.5% were married-couple households, 20.4% were households with a male householder and no spouse or partner present, and 39.9% were households with a female householder and no spouse or partner present. About 27.9% of all households were made up of individuals and 10.5% had someone living alone who was 65 years of age or older.

There were 2,639 housing units, of which 12.3% were vacant. The homeowner vacancy rate was 4.2% and the rental vacancy rate was 9.6%.

Racial composition as of the 2020 census
Race	Number	Percent
White	2,713	43.8%
Black or African American	2,347	37.9%
American Indian and Alaska Native	42	0.7%
Asian	66	1.1%
Native Hawaiian and Other Pacific Islander	7	0.1%
Some other race	408	6.6%
Two or more races	613	9.9%
Hispanic or Latino (of any race)	914	14.8%

=== 2010 census ===
The 2010 United States census counted 6,097 people, 2,286 households, and 1,591 families in the borough. The population density was 3,216.4 inhabitants per square mile (1,241.9/km^{2}). There were 2,533 housing units at an average density of 1,336.2 per square mile (515.9/km^{2}). The racial makeup was 54.49% (3,322) White, 36.72% (2,239) Black or African American, 0.34% (21) Native American, 0.71% (43) Asian, 0.07% (4) Pacific Islander, 2.35% (143) from other races, and 5.33% (325) from two or more races. Hispanic or Latino of any race were 8.89% (542) of the population.

Of the 2,286 households, 33.9% had children under the age of 18; 33.7% were married couples living together; 28.1% had a female householder with no husband present and 30.4% were non-families. Of all households, 25.7% were made up of individuals and 9.5% had someone living alone who was 65 years of age or older. The average household size was 2.66 and the average family size was 3.16.

28.3% of the population were under the age of 18, 9.6% from 18 to 24, 26.6% from 25 to 44, 24.1% from 45 to 64, and 11.4% who were 65 years of age or older. The median age was 33.7 years. For every 100 females, the population had 88.4 males. For every 100 females ages 18 and older there were 82.4 males.

The Census Bureau's 2006–2010 American Community Survey showed that (in 2010 inflation-adjusted dollars) median household income was $43,846 (with a margin of error of +/− $9,449) and the median family income was $61,147 (+/− $5,392). Males had a median income of $51,923 (+/− $6,640) versus $37,826 (+/− $5,863) for females. The per capita income for the borough was $21,061 (+/− $2,252). About 8.2% of families and 12.9% of the population were below the poverty line, including 13.6% of those under age 18 and 9.9% of those age 65 or over.

=== 2000 census ===
As of the 2000 census, there were 6,160 people, 2,353 households, and 1,614 families residing in the borough. The population density was 3,140.8 inhabitants per square mile (1,212.7/km^{2}). There were 2,628 housing units at an average density of 1,339.9 per square mile (517.3/km^{2}). The racial makeup of the borough was 63.56% White, 31.64% African American, 0.24% Native American, 0.32% Asian, 0.10% Pacific Islander, 1.31% from other races, and 2.82% from two or more races. Hispanic or Latino of any race were 4.35% of the population.

There were 2,353 households, out of which 33.1% had children under the age of 18 living with them, 38.0% were married couples living together, 24.7% had a female householder with no husband present, and 31.4% were non-families. 26.9% of all households were made up of individuals, and 11.6% had someone living alone who was 65 years of age or older. The average household size was 2.61 and the average family size was 3.15.

In the borough, the population was spread out, with 28.8% under the age of 18, 8.3% from 18 to 24, 29.8% from 25 to 44, 19.3% from 45 to 64, and 13.9% who were 65 years of age or older. The median age was 34 years. For every 100 females, there were 88.1 males. For every 100 females age 18 and over, there were 81.7 males.

The median income for a household in the borough was $35,569, and the median income for a family was $41,359. Males had a median income of $32,313 versus $24,779 for females. The per capita income for the borough was $16,368. About 14.6% of families and 17.7% of the population were below the poverty line, including 27.0% of those under age 18 and 9.2% of those age 65 or over.

== Government ==
=== Local government ===
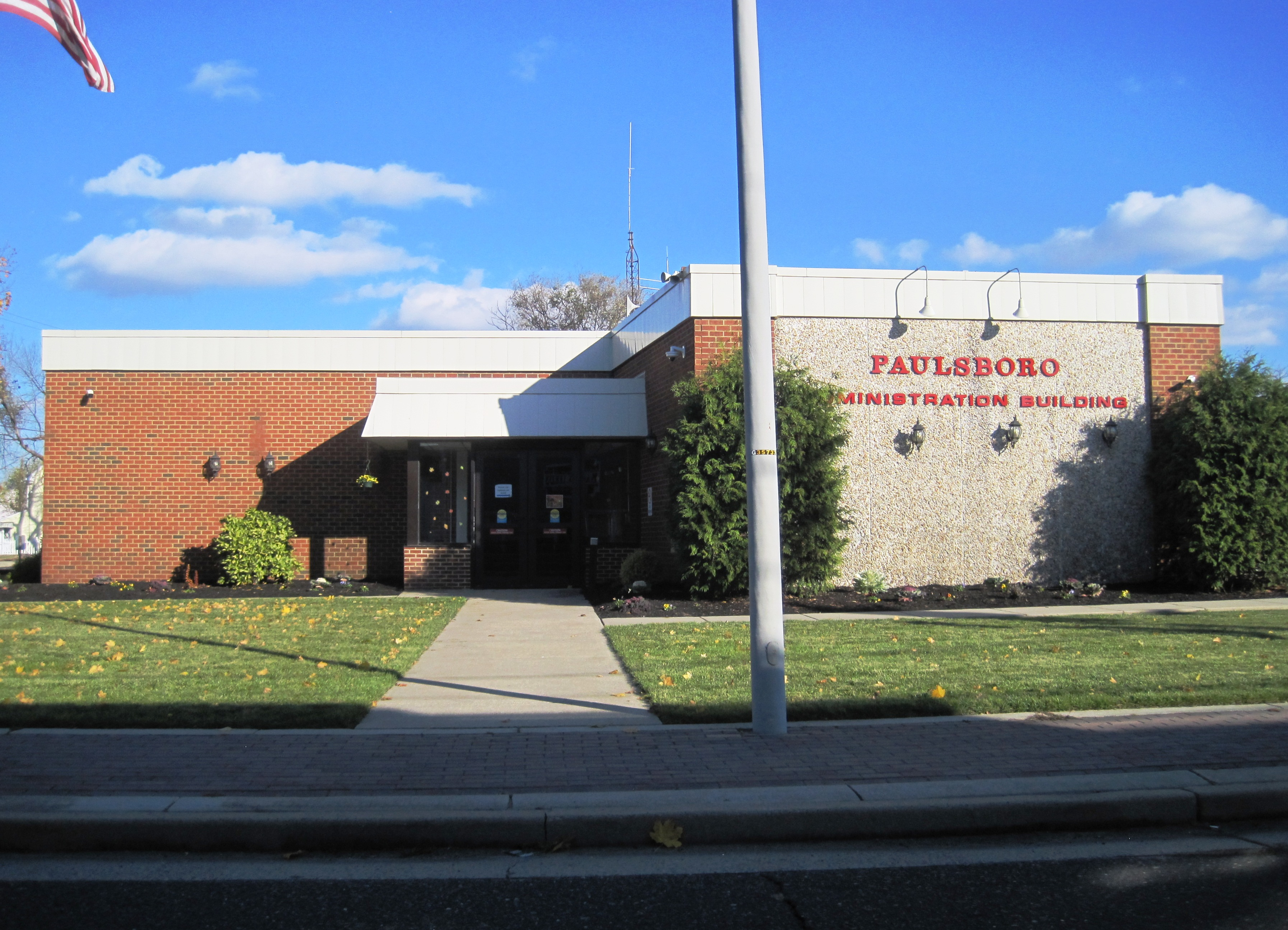
Paulsboro Administration Building

Paulsboro is governed under the borough form of New Jersey municipal government, which is used in 218 municipalities (of the 564) statewide, making it the most common form of government in New Jersey. The governing body is comprised of a mayor and a borough council, with all positions elected at-large on a partisan basis as part of the November general election. A mayor is elected directly by the voters to a four-year term of office. The borough council includes six members elected to serve three-year terms on a staggered basis, with two seats coming up for election each year in a three-year cycle. The borough form of government used by Paulsboro is a "weak mayor / strong council" government in which council members act as the legislative body with the mayor presiding at meetings and voting only in the event of a tie. The mayor can veto ordinances subject to an override by a two-thirds majority vote of the council. The mayor makes committee and liaison assignments for council members, and most appointments are made by the mayor with the advice and consent of the council.

As of 2025, the mayor of the Borough of Paulsboro is Democrat John Giovannitti, whose term of office ends December 31, 2027. Members of the Paulsboro Borough Council are Council President Tahje Thomas (D, 2026), Karen Armistead (D, 2027), Kyana Evans (D, 2025; appointed to serve an unexpired term), Theodore D. Holloway II (D, 2025; elected to serve an unexpired term), Eric Singleton (D, 2026) and Jennifer Turner (D, 2027).

In October 2024, Kyana Evans was appointed to fill the seat expiring in December 2025 that was vacated by Eric DiTonno.

Gary Stevenson was chosen in January 2012 to fill the vacant council seat of W. Jeffery Hamilton expiring in 2013, who left his seat after being sworn in as mayor. Alfonso Giampola was appointed in May 2012 to fill the vacant seat of Paul Morina for a term ending in 2014.

In January 2016, the borough council selected Eric DiTonno to fill the seat expiring in December 2016 that was vacated by Gary C. Stevenson when he took office as mayor.

In 2018, the borough had an average property tax bill of $3,997, the lowest in the county, compared to an average bill of $6,851 in Gloucester County and $8,767 statewide. The borough had the 21st-highest property tax rate in New Jersey, with an equalized rate of 4.427% in 2020, compared to 3.212% in the county as a whole and a statewide average of 2.279%.

=== Federal, state, and county representation ===
Paulsboro is located in the First Congressional District and is part of New Jersey's 3rd state legislative district.

For the 119th United States Congress, New Jersey's 1st congressional district is represented by Donald Norcross (D, Camden). New Jersey is represented in the United States Senate by Democrats Cory Booker (Newark, term ends 2027) and Andy Kim (Moorestown, term ends 2031).

For the 2026–2027 session, the 3rd legislative district of the New Jersey Legislature is represented in the State Senate by John Burzichelli (D, Paulsboro) and in the General Assembly by David Bailey (D, Woodstown) and Heather Simmons (D, Glassboro).

Gloucester County is governed by a board of county commissioners, whose seven members are elected at-large to three-year terms of office on a staggered basis in partisan elections, with either two or three seats coming up for election each year. At a reorganization meeting held each January, the Board selects a Director and a Deputy Director from among its members. As of 2025, Gloucester County's Commissioners are:

Director Frank J. DiMarco (D, Deptford Township, 2025), Matt Weng (D, Pitman, 2026), Joann Gattinelli (D, Washington Township, 2026), Nicholas DeSilvio (R, Franklin Township, 2027), Denice DiCarlo (D, West Deptford Township, 2025) Deputy Director Jim Jefferson (D, Woodbury, 2026) and Christopher Konawel Jr. (R, Glassboro, 2027).

Gloucester County's constitutional officers are: Clerk James N. Hogan (D, Franklin Township; 2027), Sheriff Carmel Morina (D, Greenwich Township; 2027) and Surrogate Giuseppe "Joe" Chila (D, Woolwich Township; 2028).

=== Politics ===
United States presidential election results for Paulsboro 2024 2020 2016 2012 2008 2004
Year	Republican		Democratic		Third party(ies)	
Year	No.	%	No.	%	No.	%
2024	785	35.03%	1428	63.72%	28	1.25%
2020	822	32.29%	1691	66.42%	33	1.30%
2016	621	28.40%	1501	68.63%	65	2.97%
2012	501	20.31%	1945	78.84%	21	0.85%
2008	586	21.88%	2059	76.89%	33	1.23%
2004	691	27.50%	1806	71.87%	16	0.64%

As of March 2011, there were a total of 3,635 registered voters in Paulsboro, of which 1,866 (51.3%) were registered as Democrats, 251 (6.9%) were registered as Republicans and 1,516 (41.7%) were registered as Unaffiliated. There were 2 voters registered as either Libertarians or Greens.

Gubernatorial election results for Paulsboro
Year	Republican		Democratic		Third party(ies)	
Year	No.	%	No.	%	No.	%
2025	489	29.84%	1,131	69.01%	19	1.16%
2021	445	36.15%	773	62.79%	13	1.06%
2017	272	23.21%	858	73.21%	42	3.58%
2013	592	43.95%	741	55.01%	14	1.04%
2009	381	24.98%	1,031	67.61%	113	7.41%
2005	332	21.35%	1,173	75.43%	50	3.22%

In the 2012 presidential election, Democrat Barack Obama received 78.8% of the vote (1,945 cast), ahead of Republican Mitt Romney with 20.3% (501 votes), and other candidates with 0.9% (21 votes), among the 2,489 ballots cast by the borough's 3,817 registered voters (22 ballots were spoiled), for a turnout of 65.2%. In the 2008 presidential election, Democrat Barack Obama received 76.0% of the vote (2,059 cast), ahead of Republican John McCain with 21.6% (586 votes) and other candidates with 1.2% (33 votes), among the 2,708 ballots cast by the borough's 3,958 registered voters, for a turnout of 68.4%. In the 2004 presidential election, Democrat John Kerry received 71.6% of the vote (1,806 ballots cast), outpolling Republican George W. Bush with 27.4% (691 votes) and other candidates with 0.4% (16 votes), among the 2,524 ballots cast by the borough's 3,796 registered voters, for a turnout percentage of 66.5.

In the 2013 gubernatorial election, Democrat Barbara Buono received 55.0% of the vote (741 cast), ahead of Republican Chris Christie with 43.9% (592 votes), and other candidates with 1.0% (14 votes), among the 1,467 ballots cast by the borough's 3,630 registered voters (120 ballots were spoiled), for a turnout of 40.4%. In the 2009 gubernatorial election, Democrat Jon Corzine received 63.2% of the vote (1,031 ballots cast), ahead of Republican Chris Christie with 23.3% (381 votes), Independent Chris Daggett with 6.3% (102 votes) and other candidates with 0.7% (11 votes), among the 1,632 ballots cast by the borough's 3,814 registered voters, yielding a 42.8% turnout.

United States Senate election results for Paulsboro1
Year	Republican		Democratic		Third party(ies)	
Year	No.	%	No.	%	No.	%
2024	648	30.55%	1,444	68.08%	29	1.37%
2018	469	30.03%	1,024	65.56%	69	4.42%
2012	380	16.12%	1,934	82.05%	43	1.82%
2006	365	23.37%	1,153	73.82%	44	2.82%

United States Senate election results for Paulsboro2
Year	Republican		Democratic		Third party(ies)	
Year	No.	%	No.	%	No.	%
2020	712	28.37%	1,735	69.12%	63	2.51%
2014	226	19.06%	937	79.01%	23	1.94%
2013	179	23.10%	587	75.74%	9	1.16%
2008	481	19.52%	1,928	78.25%	55	2.23%

== Education ==
The Paulsboro Public Schools serves students in pre-kindergarten through twelfth grade. As of the 2020–21 school year, the district, comprised of four schools, had an enrollment of 1,186 students and 101.0 classroom teachers (on an FTE basis), for a student–teacher ratio of 11.7:1. Schools in the district (with 2020–21 enrollment data from the National Center for Education Statistics) are Billingsport Early Childhood Center with 304 students in grades PreK-2, Loudenslager Elementary School with 351 students in grades 3-6, Paulsboro Junior High School with 131 students in grades 7-8, and Paulsboro High School with 351 students in grades 9-12.

Students in ninth through twelfth grades from Greenwich Township attend the district's high school as part of a sending/receiving relationship with the Greenwich Township School District.

Students from across the county are eligible to apply to attend Gloucester County Institute of Technology, a four-year high school in Deptford Township that provides technical and vocational education. As a public school, students do not pay tuition to attend the school.

The Roman Catholic Diocese of Camden oversees Guardian Angels Regional School, which has a 4–8 campus in Paulsboro while its Pre-K–3 campus is in Gibbstown. Its PreK-3 campus is in Gibbstown while its 4-8 campus is in Paulsboro.

== Transportation ==
=== Roads and highways ===
As of May 2010, the borough had a total of 26.02 miles (41.88 km) of roadways, of which 22.58 miles (36.34 km) were maintained by the municipality, 1.62 miles (2.61 km) by Gloucester County and 1.82 miles (2.93 km) by the New Jersey Department of Transportation.

Several major roadways pass through the borough. Interstate 295 and U.S. Route 130 pass through the southern tip of Paulsboro and Route 44 also traverses the borough.

=== Public transportation ===
NJ Transit bus service is available between Pennsville Township and Philadelphia on the 402 route, with local service offered on the 455 route between Cherry Hill Mall and Woodbury.

The borough operates shuttle bus service throughout the day.

== Port of Paulsboro ==
The Port of Paulsboro is located on the Delaware River and Mantua Creek in and around Paulsboro. It is traditionally one of the nation's busiest for marine transfer operations of petroleum products. From 1998 to early 2011, the Valero Energy Corporation operated an oil refinery here, which it sold in a 2010 deal to PBF Energy for $360 million. The bridge over Mantua Creek was the site of the 2012 Paulsboro train derailment, resulting in a tank car leaking 23,000 gallons of vinyl chloride into the air.

The port is being redeveloped as an adaptable omniport able to handle a diversity of bulk, break bulk cargo and shipping containers. Studies completed in 2012 concluded that the port is well-suited to become a center for the manufacture, assembly, and transport of wind turbines and platforms for the development of Atlantic Wind Connection The port has also been home to America's largest asphalt refinery, scheduled to close in 2017.

== Popular culture ==
The 2004 film Jersey Girl is set in the Jersey Shore community of Highlands but was filmed in Paulsboro.

== Notable people ==
People who were born in, residents of, or otherwise closely associated with Paulsboro include:

- Flipper Anderson (born 1965 as Willie Lee Anderson Jr.), wide receiver who played in the NFL for nine seasons for four different teams
- John J. Burzichelli (born 1954), member of the New Jersey General Assembly who was also a long-time mayor of Paulsboro
- Russell Carter (born 1985), a First Team All-Big East basketball player at the University of Notre Dame in 2006–2007
- Julién Davenport (born 1995), offensive tackle who played for the Indianapolis Colts
- Joseph H. Enos (1910–1973), politician who represented the 3rd legislative district in the New Jersey General Assembly from 1968 to 1971
- Gerald Hodges (born 1991), linebacker who has played in the NFL for the Minnesota Vikings
- Isaac F. Hughes (1861–1931), member of the Los Angeles City Council, 1925–1927
- Henry C. Loudenslager (1852–1911), represented New Jersey's 1st congressional district from 1893 to 1911
- Seth Lundy (born 2000), NBA player
- Tony Montanaro (1927–2002), mime artist who switched to the art from stage acting after seeing Marcel Marceau's 1956 performances in New York City
- Isaac Redman (born 1984), running back for the Pittsburgh Steelers
- Kevin Ross (born 1962), Paulsboro High and Temple University graduate, played in the National Football League for 14 seasons for three different teams
- Anthony Scirrotto (born 1986), football safety
- Larry Sharpe (born 1951), former professional wrestler who operates the Monster Factory training school in Paulsboro
- Alex Silvestro (born 1988), tight end, who has played in the NFL for the New England Patriots and Baltimore Ravens
- Edwin H. Simmons (1921–2007), United States Marine Corps officer
- Bhayshul Tuten (born 2002), American football running back for the Jacksonville Jaguars
- Joan Weber (1935–1981), singer who became a one-hit wonder with her 1954 song "Let Me Go, Lover!"
- Chazz Witherspoon (born 1981), professional boxer
