= List of highways numbered 44 =

The following highways are numbered 44.

== Australia ==
- Great Western Highway, Parramatta Road (Sydney)
- Captain Cook Highway – Queensland State Route 44 (Regional)
- Greensborough Highway

== Canada ==
- Alberta Highway 44
- Manitoba Highway 44
- Ontario Highway 44
- Saskatchewan Highway 44

== Germany ==
- Bundesautobahn 44

== Greece ==
- EO44 road

== Hungary ==
- Main road 44 (Hungary)

== India ==
- National Highway 44 (India)

== Israel ==
- Highway 44 (Israel)

== Iran ==
- Road 44

== Italy ==
- State road 44

== Japan ==
- Japan National Route 44
- Kushiro Sotokan Road

== Korea, South ==
- National Route 44

== New Zealand ==
- New Zealand State Highway 44

== Norway ==
- Norwegian County Road 44

== South Africa ==
- R44 (South Africa)

== Thailand ==
- Thailand Route 44

== United Arab Emirates ==
- E 44

== United Kingdom ==
- British A44 (Oxford-Aberystwyth)

== United States ==
- Interstate 44 (Texas–Missouri)
  - Interstate 44 (North Carolina–Virginia) (former proposal)
- U.S. Route 44
- Alabama State Route 44
  - County Route 44 (Lee County, Alabama)
- California State Route 44
  - County Route J44 (California)
- Colorado State Highway 44
- Delaware Route 44
- Florida State Road 44
  - County Road 44 (Citrus County, Florida)
    - County Road 44W (Citrus County, Florida)
  - County Road 44 (Lake County, Florida)
    - County Road 44B (Lake County, Florida)
- Georgia State Route 44
  - Georgia State Route 44 (former)
- Hawaii Route 44
- Idaho State Highway 44
- Illinois Route 44 (former)
- Indiana State Road 44
- Iowa Highway 44
- K-44 (Kansas highway)
- Kentucky Route 44
- Louisiana Highway 44
- Maryland Route 44 (former)
- M-44 (Michigan highway)
- Minnesota State Highway 44
  - County Road 44 (Ramsey County, Minnesota)
- Mississippi Highway 44
- Missouri Route 44 (former)
- Montana Highway 44
- Nebraska Highway 44
  - Nebraska Link 44C
  - Nebraska Recreation Road 44B
- Nevada State Route 44 (former)
- New Jersey Route 44
  - New Jersey Route 44T (former proposal)
  - County Route 44 (Bergen County, New Jersey)
  - County Route 44 (Monmouth County, New Jersey)
- New Mexico Highway 44 (former)
- New York State Route 44 (former)
  - County Route 44 (Broome County, New York)
  - County Route 44B (Cayuga County, New York)
  - County Route 44 (Chautauqua County, New York)
  - County Route 44 (Dutchess County, New York)
  - County Route 44 (Erie County, New York)
  - County Route 44 (Lewis County, New York)
  - County Route 44 (Putnam County, New York)
  - County Route 44 (Rensselaer County, New York)
  - County Route 44 (Rockland County, New York)
  - County Route 44 (Schoharie County, New York)
  - County Route 44 (St. Lawrence County, New York)
  - County Route 44 (Steuben County, New York)
  - County Route 44 (Suffolk County, New York)
  - County Route 44 (Warren County, New York)
  - County Route 44 (Washington County, New York)
  - County Route 44 (Wyoming County, New York)
- North Carolina Highway 44 (former)
- North Dakota Highway 44
- Ohio State Route 44
- Oklahoma State Highway 44
- Pennsylvania Route 44
- South Dakota Highway 44
- Tennessee State Route 44
- Texas State Highway 44
  - Texas State Highway Loop 44
  - Farm to Market Road 44
  - Texas Park Road 44
- Utah State Route 44
- Vermont Route 44
- Virginia State Route 44 (former)
- West Virginia Route 44
- Wisconsin Highway 44

== See also ==
- A44 (disambiguation)
- List of highways numbered 44A

Preceded by 43	Lists of highways 44	Succeeded by 45
