= New Jersey Route 44 =

State highway in Gloucester County, New Jersey, US

Route 44

Route information
- Maintained by NJDOT
- Length: 10.28 mi (16.54 km)
- Existed: 1927–present

Major junctions
- South end: Barker Avenue in Bridgeport
- North end: I-295 / US 130 / CR 640 in West Deptford Township

Location
- Country: United States
- State: New Jersey
- Counties: Gloucester

Highway system
- New Jersey State Highway Routes; Interstate; US; State; Scenic Byways
← Route 43	→ Route 45

Route 44 is a state highway located in Gloucester County in the U.S. state of New Jersey. It runs 10.28 mi (16.54 km) from Barker Avenue in Bridgeport to Interstate 295 (I-295)/U.S. Route 130 (US 130) in Thorofare. The route, which is mostly a two-lane undivided road, passes through the communities of Gibbstown and Paulsboro in the northern part of the county, a short distance south of the Delaware River. Route 44 generally runs a short distance to the north of I-295/US 130 for much of its length.

In 1923, Route 17S was legislated along the current route followed by Route 44 today, running between Penns Grove and Westville. The only portion of Route 17S ever built ran from Penns Grove to Salem. Route 44 was designated in 1927 to replace Route 17S between Penns Grove and Westville. By the 1940s, Route 44 was extended south to Salem and US 130 was designated concurrent with the route north of Penns Grove. Several spurs of Route 44 had existed or were planned prior to 1953, including Route S44, which ran concurrent with US 322 to the ferry between Bridgeport and Chester, Pennsylvania; Route S44A, a never-built bypass of Camden; and Route 44T, which was to run from a tunnel under the Delaware River in Paulsboro east to Route 42. In 1953, Route 44 was replaced by US 130 north of Deepwater and by Route 49 south of there. After two bypasses were built for US 130 around Carneys Point and between Bridgeport and Westville, Route 44 was redesignated along the former US 130. After I-295 was completed in the 1960s, US 130 returned to its original alignment in Carneys Point and replaced that portion of Route 44.

== Route description ==
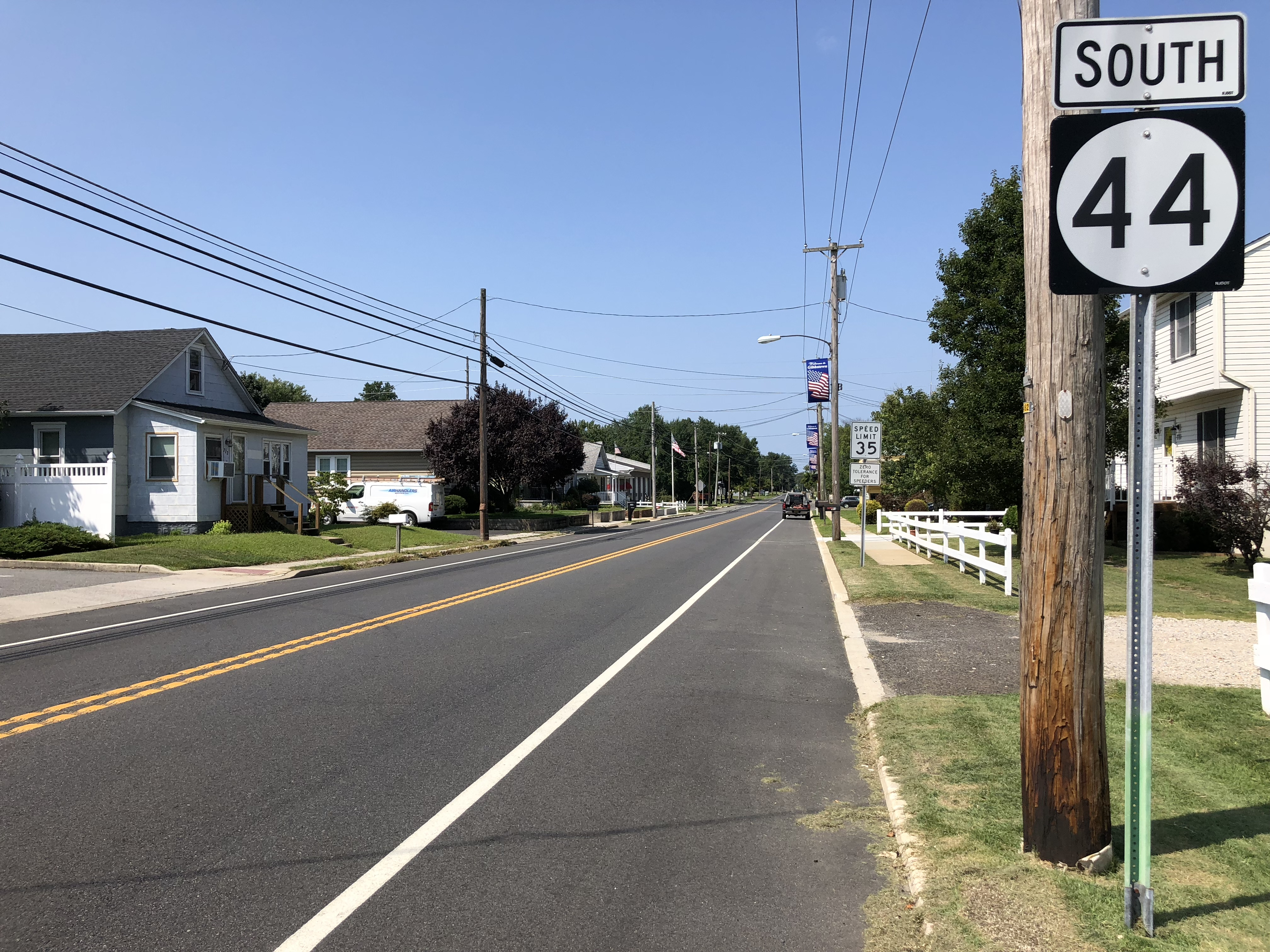
View south along Route 44 at CR 653 in Greenwich Township

Route 44 begins at an intersection with Main Street and Barker Avenue in the community of Bridgeport in Logan Township, heading to the east on Crown Point Road, a two-lane undivided road. Shortly after beginning, the route heads through wooded areas a short distance to the north of Conrail Shared Assets Operations' Penns Grove Secondary and intersects County Route 671 (CR 671). The road turns northeast and comes to an interchange with US 130 and continues closely parallel to the railroad line as it passes through more rural areas with some homes, coming to a junction with CR 684 and Flood Gate Road, the latter of which heads northwest to provide access to Bridgeport Speedway. Route 44 enters Greenwich Township upon crossing the marshy Repaupo Creek and becomes a local road called West Broad Street. The route passes over the railroad tracks and continues east into residential and commercial areas of Gibbstown, intersecting CR 607/CR 673 and CR 680 within the town.

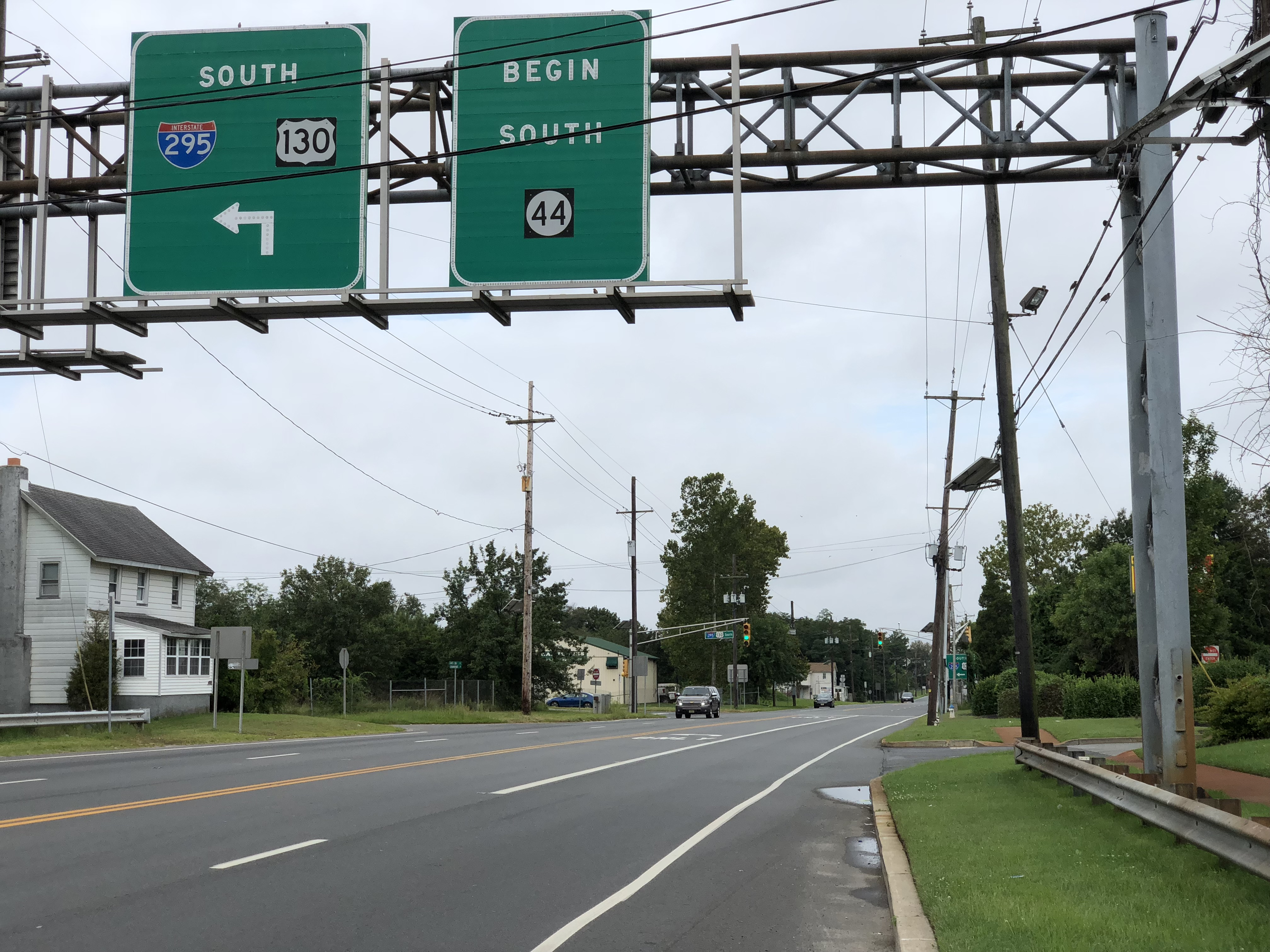
View south along Route 44 at CR 640 in West Deptford Township

At the intersection with CR 653, Route 44 enters Paulsboro and passes more developed areas, soon meeting CR 678. The route intersects CR 667 in the center of Paulsboro before crossing the Mantua Creek on a lift bridge and entering wetlands within West Deptford Township. Here, the road heads into a mix of rural lands and development, crossing CR 656 and the Little Mantua Creek. Route 44 intersects the Mid-Atlantic Parkway, which provides access to I-295 and US 130 a short distance to the south, before continuing into inhabited areas. Here, the road crosses the Conrail line and CR 643. The route becomes a four-lane road and has access ramps to and from southbound I-295/US 130 prior to coming to a crossroads with CR 640 in Thorofare. Past CR 640, the route closely parallels I-295/US 130 and crosses Woodbury Creek. Route 44 passes a mobile home park before coming to an end at cul-de-sac that has an access ramp to southbound Route 44 from southbound I-295/US 130.

== History ==
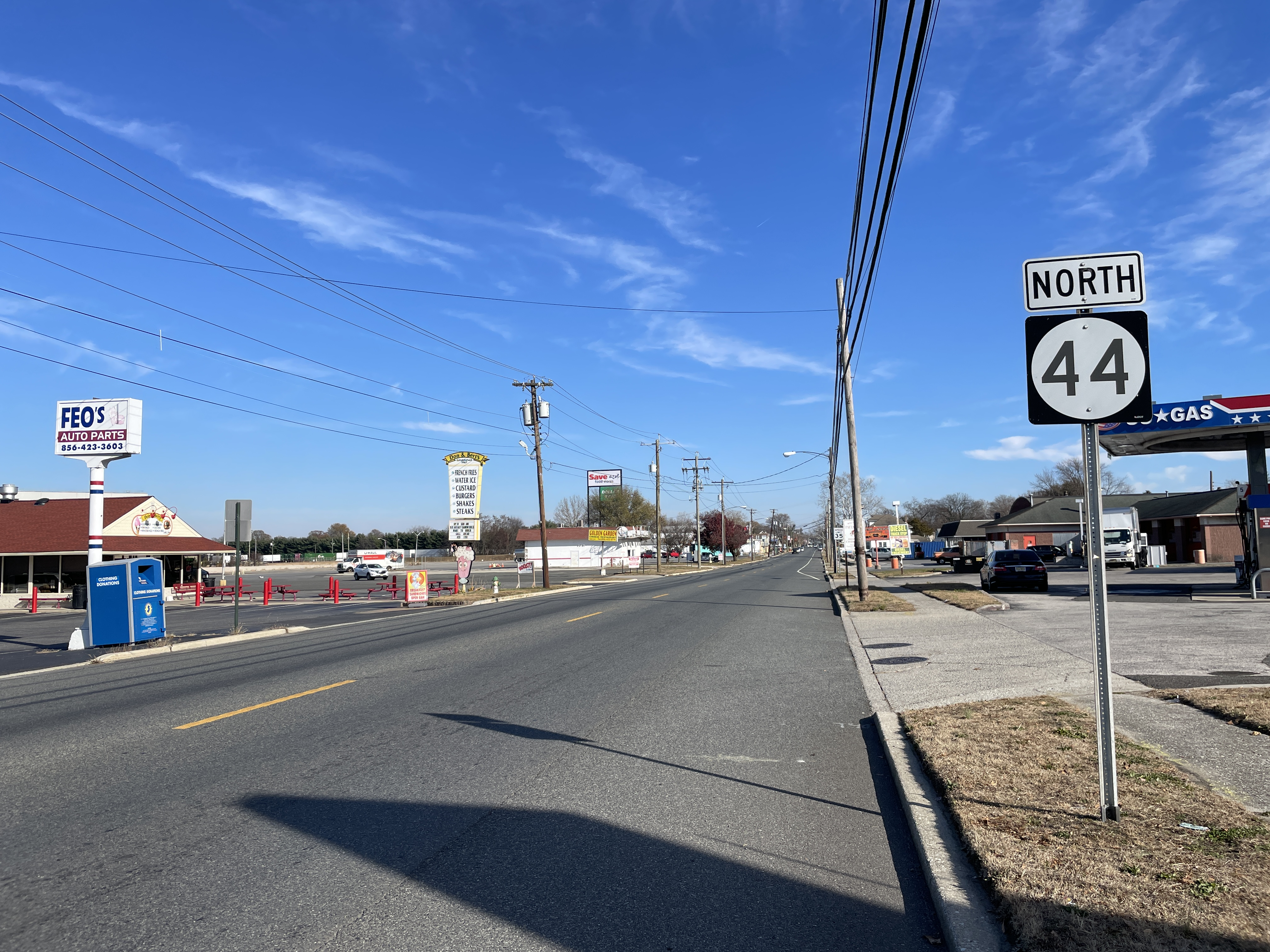
Route 44 northbound past CR 678 in Paulsboro

What is now Route 44 was originally legislated as Route 17S in 1923, a route that was to run from Penns Grove to Westville. By 1927, however, the only portion of Route 17S that had existed was a road that ran from Penns Grove south to Salem. In the 1927 New Jersey state highway renumbering that occurred that year, Route 44 was designated to run from Penns Grove to Westville, replacing what had been legislated as Route 17S. By the end of the 1930s, Route 44 was extended south from Penns Grove to Salem and US 130 was also designated along with Route 44 north of Penns Grove by 1941.

Route S44A (planned in 1938)

Prior to 1953, several spurs of Route 44 existed or were planned. Route S44 was designated in 1939 as a connection from Route 44 in Bridgeport to the ferry across the Delaware River to Chester, Pennsylvania, and was concurrent with US 322. The S44 designation was removed in 1953 to avoid the concurrency with US 322. In 1974, the Commodore Barry Bridge was built, bypassing the ferry, and the old alignment of US 322 became Route 324. Route S44A was planned in 1938 as an eastern bypass of Camden from Route 45 in Brooklawn to Route 40 (now Route 70) and Route 41 in Delaware Township (now Cherry Hill), mostly along what is now CR 551. The bypass was never built, although part of what would have been the bypass north of Haddonfield is now Route 41. Route 44T was planned in 1938 as an approach to a never-built tunnel under the Delaware River near Paulsboro. Originally, the route was to run from the tunnel east to the intersection of Route 41 and Route 47 in Deptford Township. In 1939, the planned route was extended east to Route 42 between Blackwood and Williamstown.

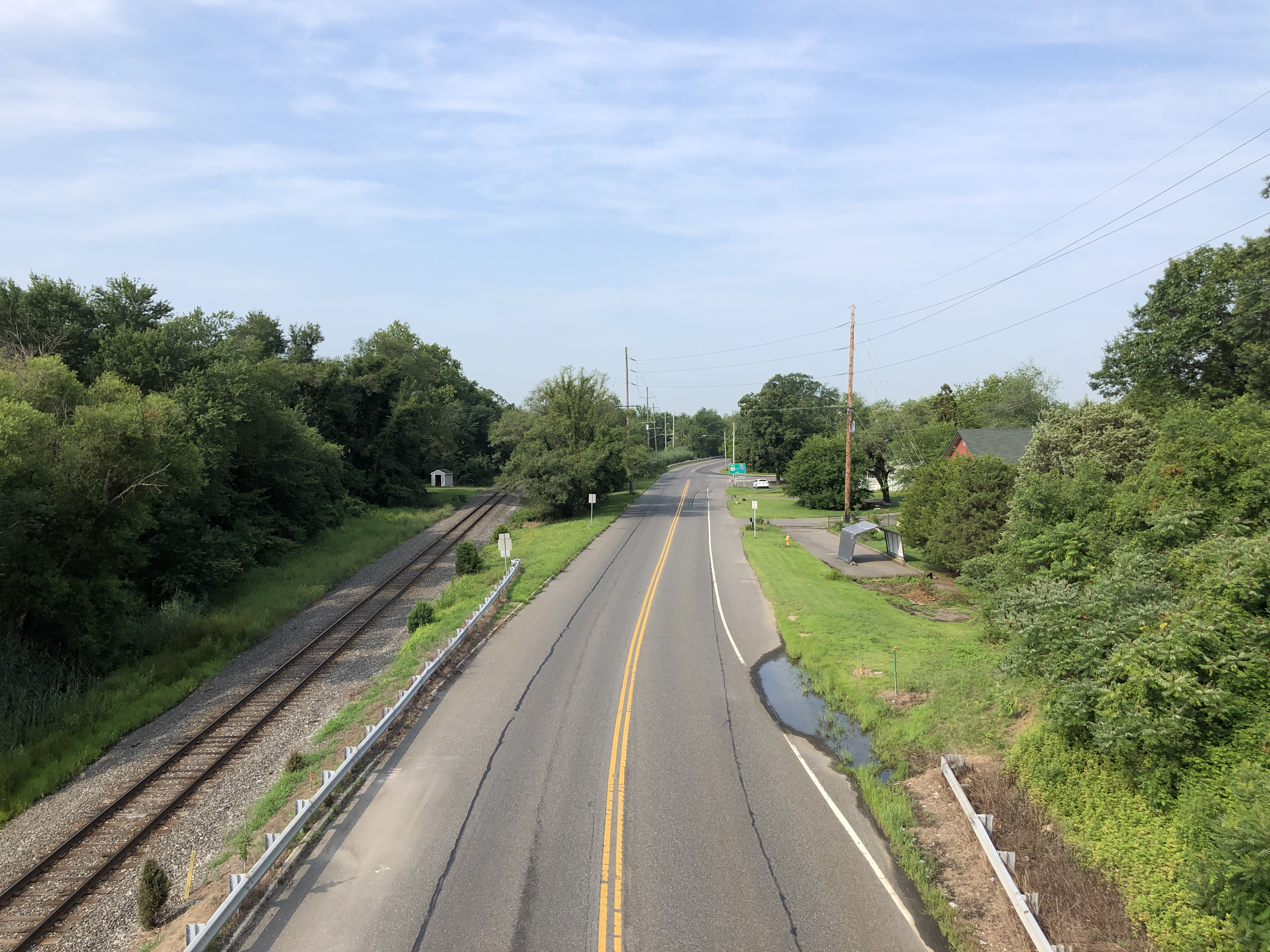
Route 44 southbound at US 130 in Logan Township

In the 1953 New Jersey state highway renumbering, Route 44 was replaced by US 130 north of the Delaware Memorial Bridge approach in Deepwater and by Route 49 south of there. However, US 130 was moved to new freeway alignments around Carneys Point and between Bridgeport and Westville. The bypassed alignments of US 130, originally unnumbered, eventually became Route 44. After I-295 was built in the 1960s, it bypassed the portion of the US 130 freeway in Bridgeport and was designated along the US 130 freeway north to Westville and around Carneys Point. US 130 was moved back onto its old alignment in Carneys Point, replacing that portion of Route 44.

== Major intersections ==
The entire route is in Gloucester County.

Location	mi	km	Destinations	Notes
Logan Township	0.00	0.00	To I-295 north / US 130 north	Southern terminus; access via Barker Avenue
Logan Township	0.86	1.38	US 130 to I-295 north – Commodore Barry Bridge	Interchange
West Deptford Township	9.20	14.81	I-295 south / US 130 south	Exit 21 on I-295
West Deptford Township	10.28	16.54	I-295 / US 130 / CR 640 (Delaware Street)	Northern terminus; exit 22 on I-295
1.000 mi = 1.609 km; 1.000 km = 0.621 mi
