= New Jersey Route 324 =

State highway in Gloucester County, New Jersey, United States

Route 324
- Old Ferry Road
- Route 324 highlighted in red

Route information
- Maintained by NJDOT
- Length: 1.51 mi (2.43 km)
- Existed: 1974–present

Major junctions
- West end: Delaware River in Logan Township
- East end: Cul-de-sac in Logan Township

Location
- Country: United States
- State: New Jersey
- Counties: Gloucester

Highway system
- New Jersey State Highway Routes; Interstate; US; State; Scenic Byways
← US 322	→ Route 347

Route 324 is an isolated and partially closed state highway in Logan Township in the U.S. state of New Jersey. The two-lane concrete route runs along the 1.51-mile-long (2.43 km) alignment of Old Ferry Road from the shore of the Delaware River to a cul-de-sac near the interchange between U.S. Route 322 (US 322) and US 130 in Logan Township. The route does not intersect with any state routes or county routes along its entire alignment. The portion from the Delaware River to Springers Lane, consisting of over half of the route, is marked with a "Road Closed" sign, with minimal if any maintenance — potholes and overgrowing vegetation plague this section.

Route 324 was a former alignment of US 322 that served the Bridgeport-Chester ferry between Bridgeport, New Jersey, and Chester, Pennsylvania. The ferry first ran on July 1, 1930, with US 322 being designated along the ferry and its access road in 1936 from Pennsylvania. The highway and ferry also shared the co-designation of State Highway Route S-44, a spur off State Highway Route 44 in Bridgeport. Route S-44 was decommissioned in the state highway renumbering while US 322 remained intact until the opening of the Commodore Barry Bridge in February 1974. The ferry made its last run at 8 p.m. on February 1, and closed down for good. US 322 was realigned onto the Commodore Barry Bridge while the former ferry alignment became Route 324.

== Route description ==
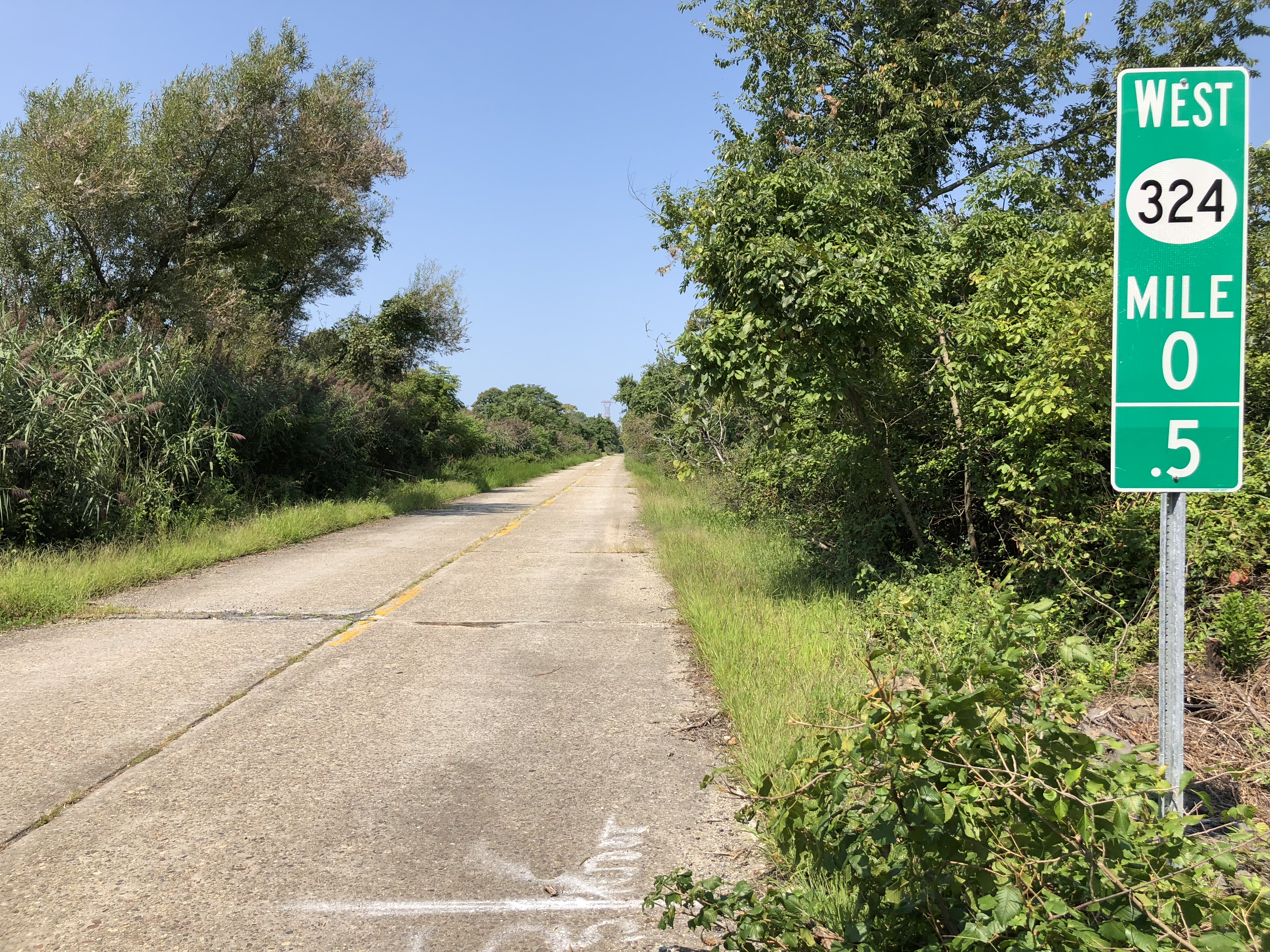
View west along a closed portion of Route 324 at milepost 0.5; the signs at this interval have since been demounted

Route 324 begins at a dead-end along the shoreline of the Delaware River and the wreckage of the old ferry dock in Logan Township. Route 324 heads eastward along Old Ferry Road, a two-lane concrete roadway surrounded by trees and fields. The two-lane concrete highway remains such for a distance, paralleling US 322 to the south, passing an access road to a business. The route heads to the east, crossing south of a pond and intersecting with Springers Lane and a dirt road in Logan Township. The entire section west of Springers Lane is marked with a "Road Closed" sign, with minimal maintenance, multiple large potholes, and overgrown vegetation crowding the roadway.

At Springers Lane, which is a former alignment of Route 44, the regularly maintained section of Route 324 begins. The road is now in an open area, crossing under power lines and intersecting with former alignments of roadway, overgrown with grass. A short distance from Springers Lane, the highway continues to the only other intersection along the route, which is for Island Road, a connector to US 130. The highway, however, continues through the desolate portions of Logan Township along a power line. A short distance later, the route passes to the south of the only development along the highway, a boat marina and two homes. Route 324 continues as a two-lane concrete road eastward until reaching a cul-de-sac just short of the US 130/US 322 interchange in Logan Township, where the designation ends.

== History ==
Route S44
- Location: Bridgeport
- Existed: 1939–1953

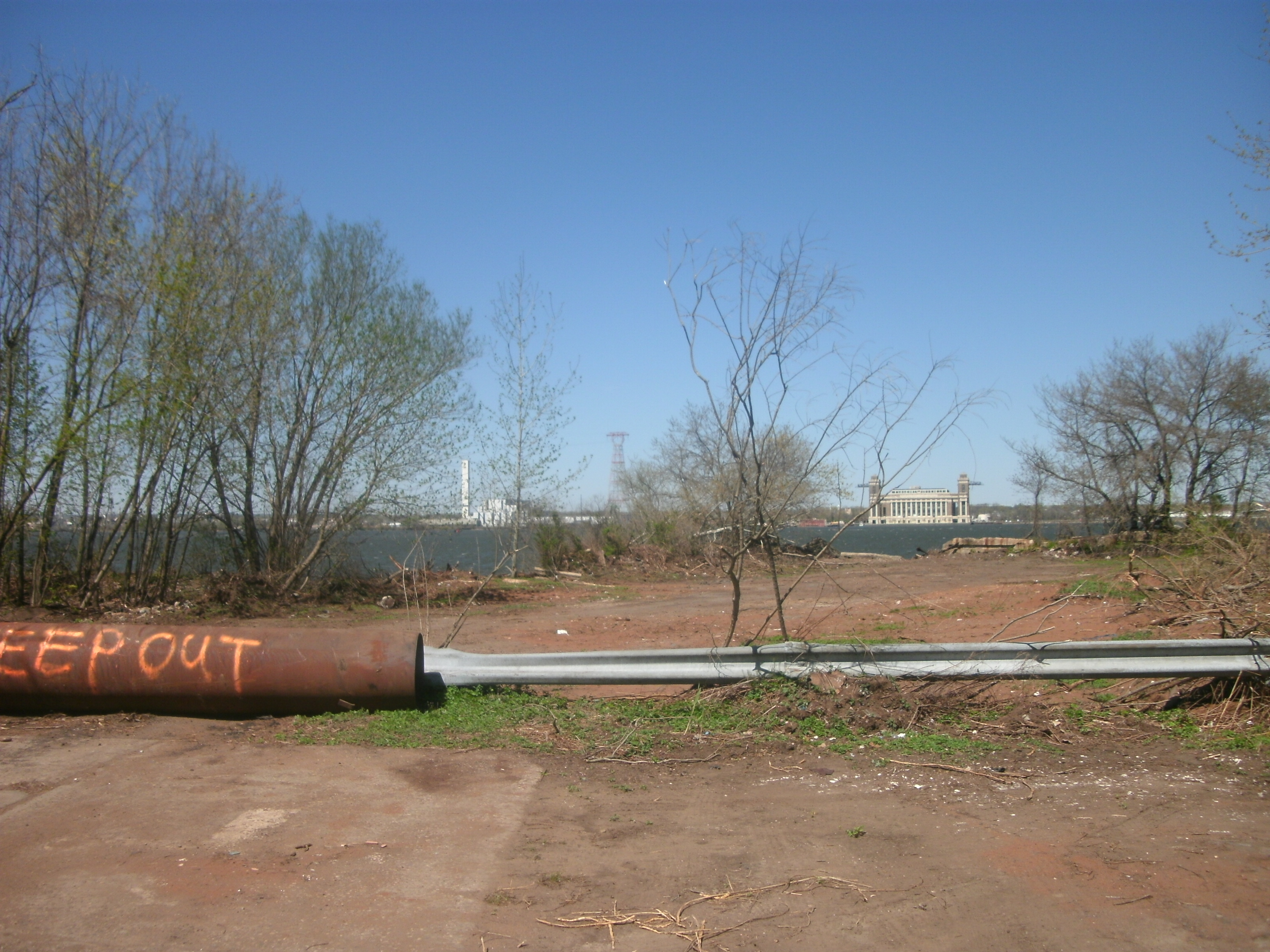
The former site of the Chester–Bridgeport ferry in Bridgeport, as seen from the western terminus of Route 324

The ferry route that Route 324 serviced first made its crossings of the Delaware River on July 1, 1930, from Chester, Pennsylvania, to Bridgeport, New Jersey. The ferry service was run with two boats, Chester, a large boat with a capacity of 60 motor vehicles, and Bridgeport, a smaller boat with a capacity of 48. The ferry system was seen as an advantage across the Delaware, providing drivers a backup from the few bridges that existed along the river. In 1936, the Bridgeport–Chester Ferry was granted the alignment for the extension of U.S. Route 322 from Pennsylvania and into New Jersey. Along with the U.S. Route 322 designation, the New Jersey State Highway Department designated the alignment of Route 322 from the ferry to U.S. Route 130, then designated as State Highway Route 44, as State Highway Route S-44.

Route 322 survived the state highway renumbering because it was a U.S. Route. However, the co-designation on the ferry stretch, State Highway Route S-44, was decommissioned in favor of just one designation. U.S. Route 322 remained on the ferry route for several years, and plans arose during the 1960s to construct a new bridge between the Delaware Memorial and Walt Whitman bridges. Construction began that year, and on February 1, 1974, the newly named Commodore Barry Bridge opened for traffic. At 8 p.m. that evening, the Bridgeport–Chester Ferry ran its final 1-mile (1.6 km) boat ride across the Delaware, and the service was closed down for good. The alignment of U.S. Route 322 was moved onto the Commodore Barry Bridge, while the former alignment was redesignated Route 324. Milepost signs were installed along the active section in 2017, but were removed by 2023.

In 2018, the portion of Route 324 from its western terminus to Springer Lane was transferred ownership to Logan Township. The following year, the same portion was vacated by Logan Township.

== Major intersections ==
The entire route is in Logan Township, Gloucester County.

mi	km	Destinations	Notes
0.00	0.00	Delaware River	Western terminus
0.95	1.53	To US 322	Access via Springers Lane
1.11	1.79	Island Road	
1.51	2.43	Cul-de-sac	Eastern terminus
1.000 mi = 1.609 km; 1.000 km = 0.621 mi
