= Cedarvale Winery =

American winery located in New Jersey

Coordinates: 39.784718°N 75.349185°W

- Location: 205 Repaupo Station Road, Logan, NJ, United States
- Coordinates: 39.784718 N, 75.349185 W
- First vines planted: 2004
- Opened to the public: 2008
- Key people: Ed & Marsha Gaventa (owners)
- Area cultivated: 8
- Cases/yr: 2,500 (2013)
- Other products: Fruits, vegetables
- Other attractions: Picnicking permitted
- Distribution: On-site, wine festivals, home shipment
- Tasting: Tastings Thursday to Sunday
- Website: http://www.cedarvalewinery.com/

Cedarvale Winery is a winery in Logan Township in Gloucester County, New Jersey. A family produce farm since 1905, the vineyard was first planted in 2004, and opened to the public in 2008. Cedarvale has 8 acres of grapes under cultivation, and produces 2,500 cases of wine per year. The winery is named for the cedar swamps bordering the farm.

== Wines and other products ==
Cedarvale Winery produces wine from Cabernet Franc, Merlot, Pinot gris, and Villard blanc grapes. Cedarvale also makes fruit wines from apples, blueberries, nectarines, and strawberries. Additionally, the farm grows fruits and vegetables. The winery is not located in one of New Jersey's three viticultural areas.

== Licensing and associations ==
Cedarvale has a farm winery license from the New Jersey Division of Alcoholic Beverage Control, which allows it to produce up to 50,000 gallons of wine per year, operate up to 15 off-premises sales rooms, and ship up to 12 cases per year to consumers in-state or out-of-state. The winery is a member of the Garden State Wine Growers Association.
