= Wade Dump =

Superfund site in Pennsylvania

- Superfund site
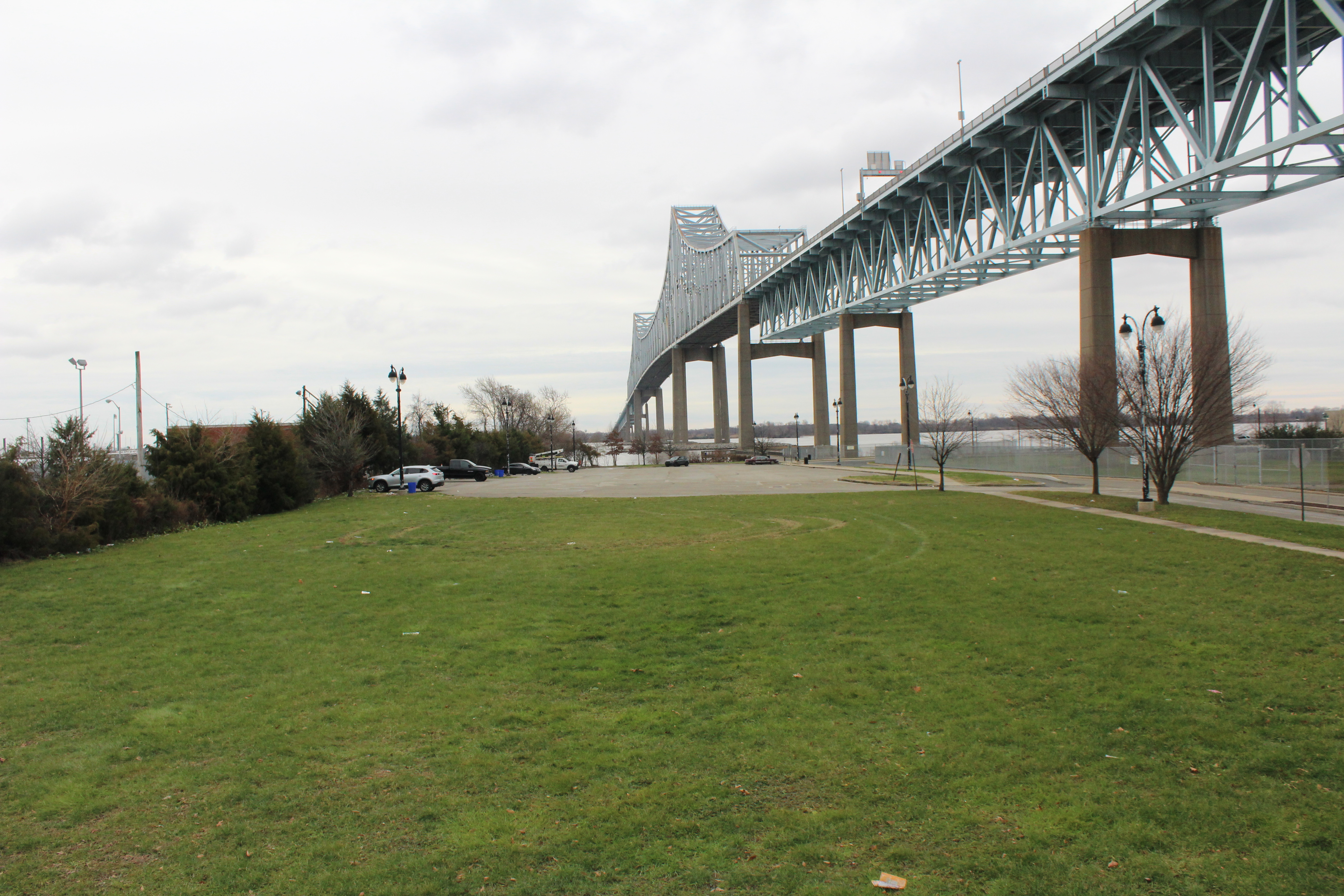
- The Wade (ABM) Superfund Site has been remediated and is currently used as a parking lot for Subaru Park

- Location within Pennsylvania
- Location: Chester, Delaware County, Pennsylvania; 39°50′04″N 75°22′39″W

Information
- CERCLIS ID: PAD980539407
- Contaminants: Arsenic, chromium, mercury, lead, PCBs, plastic resins, VOCs

Progress
- Proposed: December 30, 1982
- Listed: September 8, 1983
- Construction completed: June 29, 1988
- Deleted: March 23, 1989

Wade Dump was a rubber recycling facility and illegal industrial waste storage and disposal facility in Chester, Pennsylvania. It was located at 1 Flower Street on the western bank of the Delaware River just north of the Commodore Barry Bridge.

In 1978, a fire at the site burned out of control for several days, injuring firefighters and leading to the owner's conviction and imprisonment. Many of the first responders to the fire suffered long-term health consequences and higher-than-normal cancer rates.

In 1983, the site was designated a Superfund cleanup site by the Environmental Protection Agency (EPA) and was remediated in stages over six years. It was removed from the National Priorities List in 1989. In 2004, it was turned into a parking lot for the city's Barry Bridge Park with approval from the state and the EPA. The sixth five year review of the site conducted by the EPA in 2018 concluded that the site continues to be protective of human health and the environment. Groundwater monitoring was discontinued in 2018 and the monitoring wells decommissioned. Periodic inspections of the site are ongoing.

== History ==
From about 1950 to the early 1970s, the 3 acres (1.2 ha) site was the location of Eastern Rubber Reclaiming, a rubber recycling facility. The property owner, Melvin Wade, turned the site into an illegal industrial waste storage and disposal facility which operated until 1978. ABM Disposal Company paid Wade $1.00 to $1.50 per 55-gallon drum to store industrial waste on his property. ABM Disposal was not regulated by the state and had a long criminal record of dumping abuses in the Philadelphia area. Wade accumulated 100 to 150 drums per week and eventually had 20,000 drums and 20 tank trucks full of chemical waste on the site. The drums leaked and workers dumped their contents onto the ground or into various trenches, severely contaminating the soil and ground water. More than 3 million gallons of cyanide, benzene, toluene, sodium copper(I) cyanide, polychlorinated biphenyls (PCBs) and other chemicals were stored on the site along with thousands of tires.

In 1977, the Health Director for the City of Chester became aware of the site and inspected it along with the Pennsylvania Department of Environmental Protection (PADEP). The owner and operators of the site were ordered to cease operations and clean-up the site. During the legal appeals to this order the site was inoperative and virtually abandoned.

=== 1978 fire ===
In February 1978, an intense fire at the site destroyed one building and damaged two others where drums of waste were stored. The burning chemicals produced multi-colored smoke and noxious fumes. The Chester Fire Department mounted an aggressive attack but were driven back by exploding 55-gallon drums and disabling smoke. The fire was extinguished after 20 hours but rekindled twice in the ensuing days. The Commodore Barry Bridge was closed for the duration of the fire.

Local hospitals treated 43 firefighters for injuries sustained during the fire. The immediate effects of exposure to the toxic fumes included raw, burning throats; vomiting; a quickly forming red, itchy rash; and seared eyes and nasal passages. Over 200 first responders including firemen, police and paramedics were exposed to the toxic fumes. First responders to the fire experienced many health problems in subsequent years, including several deaths from rare cancers. Cancer rates of firemen at the fire or cleanup were five to six times the norm.

In 1980, Melvin Wade was convicted of risking a catastrophe, failing to prevent a catastrophe, and violating the Clean Water Act by polluting the Delaware River. He was sentenced to one to two years in prison and fined $30,000.

=== Cleanup ===
In late 1981 and early 1982, the EPA conducted two emergency cleanups in which workers removed an estimated 5,000 gallons of PCB-contaminated waste, 10,000 gallons of other hazardous wastes for incineration and 155 tons of contaminated solids.

In 1984, the EPA issued a Record of Decision (ROD) which outlined a long-term plan for the site cleanup which was managed by the PADEP. The work took place in 1987. Tires, tankers, debris piles, and buildings were removed, decontaminated, and disposed of. Contaminated soil was removed to depths with acceptable levels of contamination or to the level of the water table. The site was leveled, filled and graded, then covered with topsoil and seeded to minimize erosion. Thirteen separate monitoring wells were installed in order to collect groundwater sampling and conduct testing for contaminants. The EPA, in conjunction with the state, removed the site from the National Priorities List in 1989.

=== 21st century ===
In 2004, with EPA and state approval, the site was given drainpipes to clear stormwater and paved with asphalt to create a parking lot for the city's Barry Bridge Park.

In 2008, the Barry Bridge Park site adjacent to Wade Dump was selected as the site of Subaru Park, home of the Philadelphia Union Major League Soccer franchise.

In 2018, a five-year review of the site concluded that the site continues to be protective of human health and the environment. The EPA approved a request from the PADEP to discontinue groundwater monitoring at the site after nearly three decades of sampling data showed that groundwater beneath the site had reached acceptable levels of contamination. The remaining wells on the site were decommissioned. Periodic inspections are ongoing to ensure proper maintenance of the site.

In 2012, Stefan Roots published a book titled Toxic Man - the Melvin Wade Story.

== See also ==
- Port of Chester
- List of Superfund sites in Pennsylvania
