= Crown Landing LNG terminal =

Coordinates: 39.78572°N 75.42252°W

A liquefied natural gas (LNG) off-loading and processing facility called the Crown Landing LNG Terminal was proposed in Logan Township, New Jersey on a 175-acre (71 ha) site along the Delaware River. The new facility would have been one of 14 LNG off-loading and processing facilities in the United States, and would have allowed for the importation of LNG from anywhere in the world. Once the LNG was processed into natural gas, it would have been transmitted throughout the Mid Atlantic and Northeastern United States via a number of interconnections with existing natural gas pipelines that are located near the proposed terminal.

== Crown Landing calls it quits ==
On January 6, 2012, Crown Landing LLC's owner, Hess Energy, filed a letter to the Federal Energy Regulatory Commission (FERC) surrendering the authorization to construct and operate, due to the likelihood that the terminal would not be profitable. Company president Godon Shearer cited "significant increases in natural gas production from North American shale resources," and that impact on prices and demand, as the reason for halting the project.

== Lawsuit and regulatory approval ==
The facility would have included a long off-loading pier that technically would have entered the State of Delaware's waters, because the Delaware River within the Twelve-Mile Circle is all in Delaware, up to the mean low water mark on the New Jersey side. Delaware opposed the project and filed a lawsuit in federal court to stop the project from going forward on the basis that they control the waters in which part of the pier would be situated. Delaware lost the lawsuit in a Federal court ruling. However, the State of New Jersey pursued a lawsuit against Delaware in order to receive a clarification from the federal courts regarding projects that originate in New Jersey and enter Delaware waters. The United States Supreme Court, in a 6-2 decision released on March 31, 2008, ruled "while Delaware cannot block ordinary projects from going forward on the Jersey side, the proposed BP project 'goes well beyond the ordinary or usual'." "It was within Delaware's authority to prohibit construction of the facility within its domain," the majority opinion said. The Federal Energy Regulatory Commission approved the Crown Landing LNG Terminal on June 15, 2006. (The dissenting justices were the 2 members from New Jersey: Antonin Scalia and Samuel Alito. Justice Stephen Breyer, who had BP stock, did not participate.)

The Crown Landing LNG Terminal was the first LNG terminal to undergo a strict United States Coast Guard project review, as required by a Federal law passed in recent years to address the energy industry's numerous and often controversial proposal for new LNG terminals in the coastal waters on the United States.

== Capacity and design ==
The proposed terminal would have stored up to 450,000 cubic meters of LNG equivalent to 9.2 billion cubic feet (Bcf) of gas, vaporized LNG into natural gas and sent it out through connecting pipelines at a baseload rate of 1.2 Bcf, enough natural gas to supply the daily needs of about five million homes. The Crown Landing LNG terminal would have brought in a new supply of natural gas, approximately 15 percent of then-current demand for natural gas in the Mid-Atlantic region. Once on-line its proponents advocated it would have had a stabilizing effect on natural gas prices in the region by providing additional natural gas more reliably than distant suppliers as far away as the Gulf of Mexico. The advent of massive domestic natural gas production proved against those assertions, resulting in the company withdrawing the project.

The LNG terminal would have connected to three major natural gas pipeline systems serving the Northeastern United States. A new eleven miles (18 km) pipeline from the Crown Landing LNG Terminal, called the Logan Lateral Projects, would have connected the new LNG terminal to a regional natural gas pipeline in Brookhaven, Pennsylvania, providing natural gas to the Mid-Atlantic region. The proposed pipeline also received Federal Energy Regulatory Commission approval in 2006. According to the original developer of the project BP (BP subsequently sold the project to Hess Energy), when built, Crown Landing would have been the most modern facility of its type in the United States.

As of July 2008, the LNG terminal at Crown Landing was cancelled due to the U.S. Supreme Court decision earlier in the year. The backers of the Crown Landing LNG terminal looked for another site in the Delaware Valley that would have been suitable and would have gained regulatory approval.

In 2009, energy company Hess LNG acquired BP's ownership interests in Crown Landing.

== See also ==
- Environmental Impact Statements (EISs) Final Environmental Impact Statement on the Crown Landing LNG and Logan Lateral Projects - Issued: April 28, 2006
- BP Crown Landing Website - Official Project Website of Project Developer BP
