= New Jersey Route 44T =

Proposed State highway in New Jersey, US

Route 44T
- Gloucester County Tunnel

Route information
- Maintained by New Jersey State Highway Department
- Existed: 1938-1939–1953

Major junctions
- West end: Pennsylvania state line in Paulsboro
- East end: Route 42 in Williamstown

Location
- Country: United States
- State: New Jersey

Highway system
- New Jersey State Highway Routes; Interstate; US; State; Scenic Byways
← Route 44	→ Route 45

Route 44T, also known as the Gloucester County Tunnel, was a proposed state highway and vehicular tunnel during the 1930s from Gloucester County, New Jersey to Philadelphia County, Pennsylvania. The route was to begin at the state line near Paulsboro, New Jersey, heading eastward as a freeway through several southern New Jersey communities and providing access from New Jersey Route 42 to the Delaware River.

The plans for the original freeway date back to 1930, when the original studies and requests were decided on by the New Jersey State Legislature. Plans soon followed in Pennsylvania, but after three years of receiving approval, the Gloucester County Tunnel experienced several setbacks. In 1938, the New Jersey State Legislature designated the State Highway Route 44-T designation, as a suffixed tunnel spur of New Jersey Route 44. In the 1953 renumbering, Route 44-T was renumbered Route 78, but it was never built and the tunnel was never constructed by the Gloucester County Tunnel Commission.

== Route description ==
State Highway Route 44-T was designated to start at the Pennsylvania state line near the community of Paulsboro along the Gloucester County Tunnel. Route 44-T would then head eastward along the tunnel, coming ashore in Paulsboro and onto lands in New Jersey. In New Jersey, the highway was proposed to head eastward along the Pine Barrens region as a freeway, interchanging with State Highway Route 44 (also designated U.S. Route 130) in Paulsboro. From there, it would head to the northeast, interchanging with State Highway Route 45 further east. From that point, the highway was to continue eastward, interchanging with State Highway Route 47 in Blackwood. After interchanging with State Highway Route 41 in Blackwood, Route 44-T would head eastward, interchanging with State Highway Route 42 (also designated U.S. Route 322) in Williamstown, where the designation would terminate.

== History ==
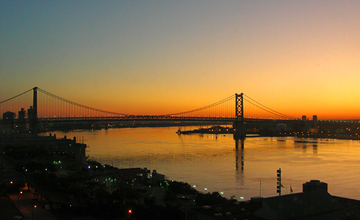
Route 44-T and the Gloucester County Tunnel were proposed as an alternate to the Benjamin Franklin Bridge, seen in this photo at sunrise

The plans for a tunnel across the Delaware River from Gloucester County, New Jersey to Philadelphia, Pennsylvania date back to 1930, when the state of New Jersey set aside funding to study the feasibility of such an accomplishment. The origination for the tunnel were by local businessmen and officials who suggested another crossing across the Delaware after the success with the Benjamin Franklin Bridge. This coincided with plans in 1930 to build new tunnels from New York to New Jersey and vice versa with Pennsylvania. The states of New Jersey and Pennsylvania continued further interest, with Governor Gifford Pinchot signing a preliminary bill at Harrisburg, Pennsylvania on December 23, 1933, for a new tunnel. The tunnel was proposed to be 10 miles (16 km) south of the Benjamin Franklin Bridge in Camden. In May 1935, the New Jersey State Highway Department started purchasing lands around the proposed tunnel location in Paulsboro for the construction, which as proposed would take about two years to construct and provide 4,000 jobs to men in the region. In 1937, the Gloucester County Tunnel Commission was authorized by legislature to help foresee ownership and construction of the new tunnel, which had yet to be constructed. After another year of financial setbacks, the permits to the construct the Gloucester County Tunnel was approved once again, despite protests by officials in Philadelphia. The project at this point would cost $17.5 million (1938 USD) to construct. The Pennsylvania State Legislature in Harrisburg performed the same actions a year later.

As a result of the signing of the roadway in New Jersey, the New Jersey State Legislature set forth the proposed designation of State Highway Route 44-T as the approaches to the tunnel and a freeway built off the tunnel. The designation came as a spur of U.S. Route 130/State Highway Route 44 in Paulsboro. A year later, the Route 44-T designation was extended to end at State Highway Route 42 in Williamstown. Although plans for a tunnel continued into the late 1940s, no tunnel was ever constructed. Planned expansion of the Philadelphia International Airport forced Pennsylvania officials to back out of the proposed tunnel alignment. The project soon morphed into designing and constructing the Walt Whitman Bridge thereafter.

== Major intersections ==
The entire route is in Gloucester County.

Location	mi	km	Destinations	Notes
Paulsboro			Pennsylvania state line	Proposed western terminus of Route 44T.
Paulsboro			US 130 / Route 44	
Paulsboro			Route 45	
Blackwood			Route 47	
Blackwood			Route 41	Original proposed eastern terminus of Route 44T.
Williamstown			US 322 / Route 42	Proposed eastern terminus of Route 44T.
1.000 mi = 1.609 km; 1.000 km = 0.621 mi

== See also ==
- Benjamin Franklin Bridge
- New Jersey Route 324
