= Woolwich Township, New Jersey =

Township in Gloucester County, New Jersey, US

- Township
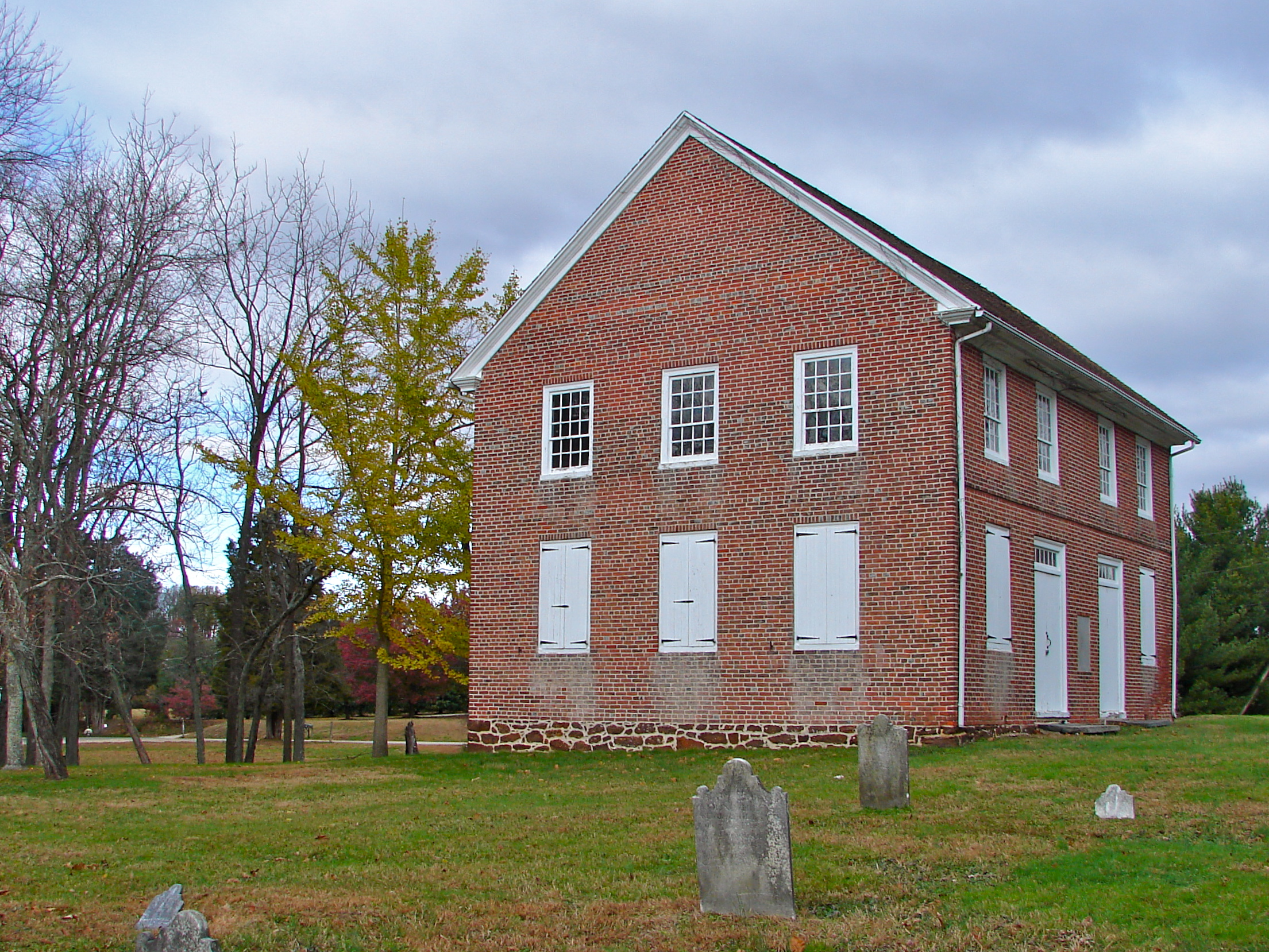
- Historic Moravian Church

- coat of arms

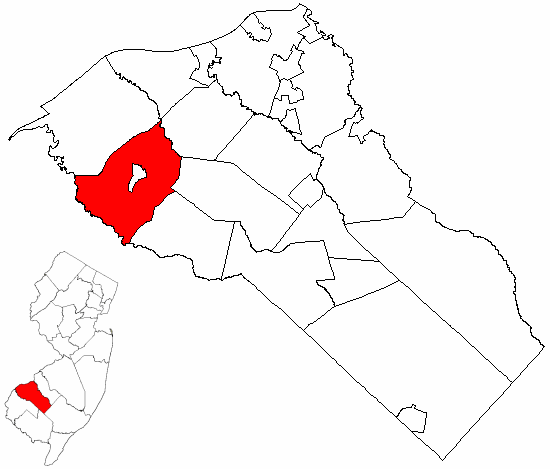
- Woolwich Township highlighted in Gloucester County. Inset map: Gloucester County highlighted in New Jersey.

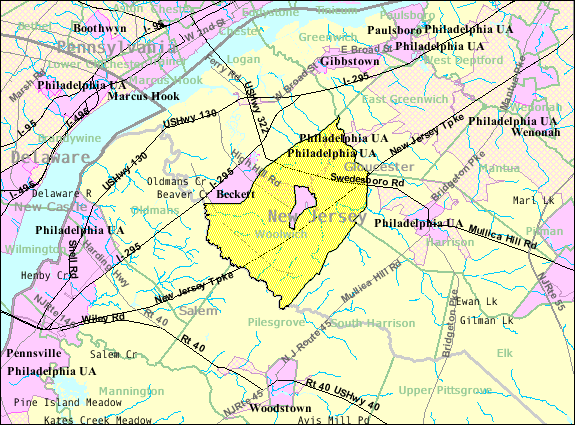
- Census Bureau map of Woolwich Township, New Jersey

- Location in Gloucester County Location in New Jersey Location in the United States
- Coordinates: 39.743264°N 75.326111°W
- Country: United States
- State: New Jersey
- County: Gloucester
- Royal charter: March 7, 1767
- Incorporated: February 21, 1798
- Named for: Woolwich, England

Government
  - Type: Township
  - Body: Township Committee
  - Mayor: Natalie Matthias (D, term as mayor ends December 31, 2026)
  - Administrator / Municipal clerk: Jim Watson
  - Administrator / Municipal clerk: Jessica Mignogna

Area
  - Total: 21.39 sq mi (55.41 km^{2})
  - Land: 21.07 sq mi (54.58 km^{2})
  - Water: 0.32 sq mi (0.83 km^{2}) 1.50%
  - Rank: 132nd of 565 in state 5th of 24 in county
- Elevation: 66 ft (20 m)

Population (2020)
  - Total: 12,577
  - Estimate (2024): 14,658
  - Rank: 203rd of 565 in state 9th of 24 in county
  - Density: 596.9/sq mi (230.5/km^{2})
  - Rank: 430th of 565 in state 19th of 24 in county
- Time zone: UTC−05:00 (Eastern (EST))
  - Summer (DST): UTC−04:00 (Eastern (EDT))
- ZIP Code: 08085 – Swedesboro
- Area code: 856 Exchanges: 241, 467
- FIPS code: 3401582840
- GNIS feature ID: 0882144
- Website: woolwichtwp.org

Woolwich Township is a township within Gloucester County in the U.S. state of New Jersey, within the Philadelphia metropolitan area. As of the 2020 United States census, the township's population was 12,577, its highest decennial count ever and an increase of 2,377 (+23.3%) from the 2010 census count of 10,200, which in turn reflected an increase of 7,168 (+236.4%) from the 3,032 counted in the 2000 census. Woolwich Township and surrounding Gloucester County constitute part of South Jersey.

== History ==
Woolwich was formed by royal charter on March 7, 1767, from portions of Greenwich Township and was incorporated as one of New Jersey's initial 104 townships as an act of the New Jersey Legislature on February 21, 1798. Portions of the township were taken to form Franklin Township (January 27, 1820), Spicer Township (March 13, 1844, now known as Harrison Township), West Woolwich Township (March 7, 1877, now known as Logan Township) and Swedesboro (April 9, 1902). The township was named after Woolwich, England.

== Geography ==
According to the U.S. Census Bureau, the township had a total area of 21.39 square miles (55.41 km^{2}), including 21.07 square miles (54.58 km^{2}) of land and 0.32 square miles (0.83 km^{2}) of water (1.50%).

Swedesboro is an independent municipality entirely surrounded by the township, making it one of 21 pairs of "doughnut towns" in the state, where one municipality entirely surrounds another. The township borders the Gloucester County municipalities of East Greenwich Township, Harrison Township, Logan Township, and South Harrison Township. The township also borders Oldmans Township and Pilesgrove Township in Salem County.

Unincorporated communities, localities and place names located partially or completely within the township include Asbury, Dilkes Mills, Lippencott, Porches Mill, Robbins, Rulons and Scull.

== Demographics ==
Historical population
Census	Pop.	Note	%±
1800	2,768		—
1810	3,063		10.7%
1820	3,113		1.6%
1830	3,033	*	−2.6%
1840	3,676		21.2%
1850	3,265	*	−11.2%
1860	3,478		6.5%
1870	3,760		8.1%
1880	1,974	*	−47.5%
1890	2,035		3.1%
1900	2,291		12.6%
1910	1,136	*	−50.4%
1920	973		−14.3%
1930	1,196		22.9%
1940	1,193		−0.3%
1950	1,343		12.6%
1960	1,235		−8.0%
1970	1,147		−7.1%
1980	1,129		−1.6%
1990	1,459		29.2%
2000	3,032		107.8%
2010	10,200		236.4%
2020	12,577		23.3%
2024 (est.)	14,658		16.5%
Population sources: 1800–2000 1800–1920 1840; 1850–1870 1850 1870; 1880–1890 1890–1910; 1910–1930 1940–2000; 2000 2010 2020 * = Lost territory in previous decade.

=== 2010 census ===
The 2010 United States census counted 10,200 people, 3,141 households, and 2,730 families in the township. The population density was 487.8 inhabitants per square mile (188.3/km^{2}). There were 3,275 housing units at an average density of 156.6 per square mile (60.5/km^{2}). The racial makeup was 81.14% (8,276) White, 9.97% (1,017) Black or African American, 0.13% (13) Native American, 6.02% (614) Asian, 0.00% (0) Pacific Islander, 0.78% (80) from other races, and 1.96% (200) from two or more races. Hispanic or Latino of any race were 3.58% (365) of the population.

Of the 3,141 households, 54.4% had children under the age of 18; 78.0% were married couples living together; 6.0% had a female householder with no husband present and 13.1% were non-families. Of all households, 9.7% were made up of individuals and 2.9% had someone living alone who was 65 years of age or older. The average household size was 3.21 and the average family size was 3.46.

33.5% of the population were under the age of 18, 4.9% from 18 to 24, 31.8% from 25 to 44, 23.4% from 45 to 64, and 6.4% were 65 years of age or older. The median age was 35.7 years. For every 100 females, the population had 99.2 males. For every 100 females ages 18 and older, there were 95.6 males.

The Census Bureau's 2006–2010 American Community Survey showed that (in 2010 inflation-adjusted dollars) median household income was $109,360 (with a margin of error of +/− $6,043) and the median family income was $117,708 (+/− $6,397). Males had a median income of $82,370 (+/− $5,125) versus $52,083 (+/− $6,470) for females. The per capita income for the borough was $36,898 (+/− $2,081). About 3.6% of families and 3.6% of the population were below the poverty line, including 4.7% of those under age 18 and 8.7% of those age 65 or over.

=== 2000 census ===
As of the 2000 census, there were 3,032 people, 959 households, and 838 families residing in the township. The population density was 144.8 inhabitants per square mile (55.9/km^{2}). There were 1,026 housing units at an average density of 49.0 per square mile (18.9/km^{2}). The racial makeup of the township was 91.13% White, 4.55% African American, 1.12% Asian, 1.95% from other races, and 1.25% from two or more races. Hispanic or Latino people of any race were 3.89% of the population.

There were 959 households, out of which 49.5% had children under the age of 18 living with them, 77.4% were married couples living together, 6.9% had a female householder with no husband present, and 12.6% were non-families. 8.6% of all households were made up of individuals, and 4.0% had someone living alone who was 65 years of age or older. The average household size was 3.13 and the average family size was 3.35.

In the township, the population was spread out, with 31.4% under the age of 18, 5.2% from 18 to 24, 38.0% from 25 to 44, 18.6% from 45 to 64, and 6.8% who were 65 years of age or older. The median age was 34 years. For every 100 females, there were 98.6 males. For every 100 females age 18 and over, there were 98.6 males.

The median income for a household in the township was $83,790, and the median income for a family was $87,111. Males had a median income of $54,200 versus $38,571 for females. The per capita income for the township was $29,503. About 1.9% of families and 2.9% of the population were below the poverty line, including none of those under age 18 and 19.6% of those age 65 or over.

== Economy ==
Along U.S. Route 322 at exit 2 of the New Jersey Turnpike, plans call for almost 1,500,000 square feet (140,000 m^{2}) of retail and commercial space and an equal amount of office and flex park. Partnering with the state Office of Smart Growth, a major component of any development along Route 322 will include the use of transfer of development rights.

== Government ==
=== Local government ===
Woolwich Township is governed under the Township form of New Jersey municipal government, one of 141 municipalities (of the 564) statewide that use this form, the second-most commonly used form of government in the state. The Township Committee is comprised of five members, who are elected directly by the voters at-large in partisan elections to serve three-year terms of office on a staggered basis, with either one or two seats coming up for election each year as part of the November general election in a three-year cycle. At an annual reorganization meeting, the Township Committee selects one of its members to serve as Mayor, and another as Deputy Mayor.

As of 2025, members of the Woolwich Township Committee are Mayor Natalie Matthias (D, term on committee ends December 31, 2026; term as mayor ends 2025), Deputy Mayor Michael Nocentino (D, term on committee and as deputy mayor ends 2025), Craig Frederick (R, 2027), Francis McGovern Jr. (D, 2026) and Cindy Minhas (R, 2027).

In 2018, the township had an average property tax bill of $10,727, the highest in the county, compared to an average bill of $8,767 statewide.

=== Federal, state and county representation ===
Woolwich Township is located in the 2nd Congressional District and is part of New Jersey's 3rd state legislative district.

For the 119th United States Congress, New Jersey's 2nd congressional district is represented by Jeff Van Drew (R, Dennis Township). New Jersey is represented in the United States Senate by Democrats Cory Booker (Newark, term ends 2027) and Andy Kim (Moorestown, term ends 2031).

For the 2026–2027 session, the 3rd legislative district of the New Jersey Legislature is represented in the State Senate by John Burzichelli (D, Paulsboro) and in the General Assembly by David Bailey (D, Woodstown) and Heather Simmons (D, Glassboro).

Gloucester County is governed by a board of county commissioners, whose seven members are elected at-large to three-year terms of office on a staggered basis in partisan elections, with either two or three seats coming up for election each year. At a reorganization meeting held each January, the Board selects a Director and a Deputy Director from among its members. As of 2025, Gloucester County's Commissioners are:

Director Frank J. DiMarco (D, Deptford Township, 2025), Matt Weng (D, Pitman, 2026), Joann Gattinelli (D, Washington Township, 2026), Nicholas DeSilvio (R, Franklin Township, 2027), Denice DiCarlo (D, West Deptford Township, 2025) Deputy Director Jim Jefferson (D, Woodbury, 2026) and Christopher Konawel Jr. (R, Glassboro, 2027).

Gloucester County's constitutional officers are: Clerk James N. Hogan (D, Franklin Township; 2027), Sheriff Carmel Morina (D, Greenwich Township; 2027) and Surrogate Giuseppe "Joe" Chila (D, Woolwich Township; 2028).

=== Politics ===
United States presidential election results for Woolwich Township 2024 2020 2016 2012 2008 2004
Year	Republican		Democratic		Third party(ies)	
Year	No.	%	No.	%	No.	%
2024	3,857	48.92%	3,928	49.82%	99	1.26%
2020	3,593	48.00%	3,797	50.72%	96	1.28%
2016	2,781	49.68%	2,621	46.82%	196	3.50%
2012	2,536	51.99%	2,289	46.92%	53	1.09%
2008	2,163	47.82%	2,316	51.20%	44	0.97%
2004	1,767	57.75%	1,273	41.60%	20	0.65%

As of March 2011, there were a total of 6,032 registered voters in Woolwich, of which 1,675 (27.8%) were registered as Democrats, 1,287 (21.3%) were registered as Republicans and 3,067 (50.8%) were registered as Unaffiliated. There were 3 voters registered as Libertarians or Greens.

In the 2012 presidential election, Republican Mitt Romney received 52.0% of the vote (2,536 cast), ahead of Democrat Barack Obama with 46.9% (2,289 votes), and other candidates with 1.1% (53 votes), among the 4,897 ballots cast by the township's 6,682 registered voters (19 ballots were spoiled), for a turnout of 73.3%. In the 2008 presidential election, Democrat Barack Obama received 50.9% of the vote (2,316 cast), ahead of Republican John McCain with 47.6% (2,163 votes) and other candidates with 1.0% (44 votes), among the 4,547 ballots cast by the township's 5,858 registered voters, for a turnout of 77.6%. In the 2004 presidential election, Republican George W. Bush received 57.6% of the vote (1,767 ballots cast), outpolling Democrat John Kerry with 41.5% (1,273 votes) and other candidates with 0.5% (20 votes), among the 3,070 ballots cast by the township's 3,736 registered voters, for a turnout percentage of 82.2.

Gubernatorial election results for Woolwich Township
Year	Republican		Democratic		Third party(ies)	
Year	No.	%	No.	%	No.	%
2025	2,907	47.48%	3,184	52.01%	31	0.51%
2021	2,391	54.60%	1,961	44.78%	27	0.62%
2017	1,412	45.56%	1,621	52.31%	66	2.13%
2013	1,989	70.83%	788	28.06%	31	1.10%
2009	1,594	55.79%	1,055	36.93%	208	7.28%
2005	1,116	52.03%	972	45.31%	57	2.66%

In the 2013 gubernatorial election, Republican Chris Christie received 70.8% of the vote (1,989 cast), ahead of Democrat Barbara Buono with 28.1% (788 votes), and other candidates with 1.1% (31 votes), among the 2,848 ballots cast by the township's 6,845 registered voters (40 ballots were spoiled), for a turnout of 41.6%. In the 2009 gubernatorial election, Republican Chris Christie received 55.1% of the vote (1,594 ballots cast), ahead of Democrat Jon Corzine with 36.5% (1,055 votes), Independent Chris Daggett with 6.7% (195 votes) and other candidates with 0.4% (13 votes), among the 2,892 ballots cast by the township's 5,800 registered voters, yielding a 49.9% turnout.

United States Senate election results for Woolwich Township1
Year	Republican		Democratic		Third party(ies)	
Year	No.	%	No.	%	No.	%
2024	3,714	48.25%	3,908	50.77%	75	0.97%
2018	2,426	51.82%	2,109	45.04%	147	3.14%
2012	2,321	49.51%	2,284	48.72%	83	1.77%
2006	1,258	52.24%	1,096	45.51%	54	2.24%

United States Senate election results for Woolwich Township2
Year	Republican		Democratic		Third party(ies)	
Year	No.	%	No.	%	No.	%
2020	3,629	49.04%	3,670	49.59%	101	1.36%
2014	1,253	53.14%	1,062	45.04%	43	1.82%
2013	747	52.20%	674	47.10%	10	0.70%
2008	2,090	48.76%	2,114	49.32%	82	1.91%

== Education ==
Public school students in pre-kindergarten through sixth grade attend the Swedesboro-Woolwich School District, a consolidated school district that serves students from both Swedesboro and Woolwich Township. As of the 2020–21 school year, the district, comprised of four schools, had an enrollment of 1,495 students and 138.7 classroom teachers (on an FTE basis), for a student–teacher ratio of 10.8:1. Schools in the district (with 2020–21 enrollment data from the National Center for Education Statistics) are Margaret C. Clifford School with 230 students in grades Pre-K–K (located in Swedesboro), Governor Charles C. Stratton School with 402 students in grades 1–2 (Woolwich Township), General Charles G. Harker School with 653 students in Grades 3–5 (Woolwich Township), and Walter H. Hill School with 210 students in Grade 6 (Swedesboro).

Public school students in seventh through twelfth grades are educated by the Kingsway Regional School District, which also serves students from East Greenwich Township, South Harrison Township and Swedesboro, with the addition of students from Logan Township who attend the district's high school as part of a sending/receiving relationship in which tuition is paid on a per-pupil basis by the Logan Township School District. Woolwich Township accounts for one third of district enrollment. As of the 2020–21 school year, the high school district, comprised of two schools, had an enrollment of 2,868 students and 207.8 classroom teachers (on an FTE basis), for a student–teacher ratio of 13.8:1. The schools in the district (with 2020–21 enrollment data from the National Center for Education Statistics) are Kingsway Regional Middle School with 1,023 students in grades 7–8, and Kingsway Regional High School with 1,802 students in grades 9–12. Under a 2011 proposal, Kingsway would merge with its constituent member's K–6 districts to become a full K–12 district, with various options for including Logan Township as part of the consolidated district.

Students from across the county are eligible to apply to attend Gloucester County Institute of Technology, a four-year high school in Deptford Township that provides technical and vocational education. As a public school, students do not pay tuition to attend the school.

Guardian Angels Regional School is a K-8 school that operates under the auspices of the Roman Catholic Diocese of Camden. Its PreK-3 campus is in Gibbstown while its 4-8 campus is in Paulsboro.

== Transportation ==
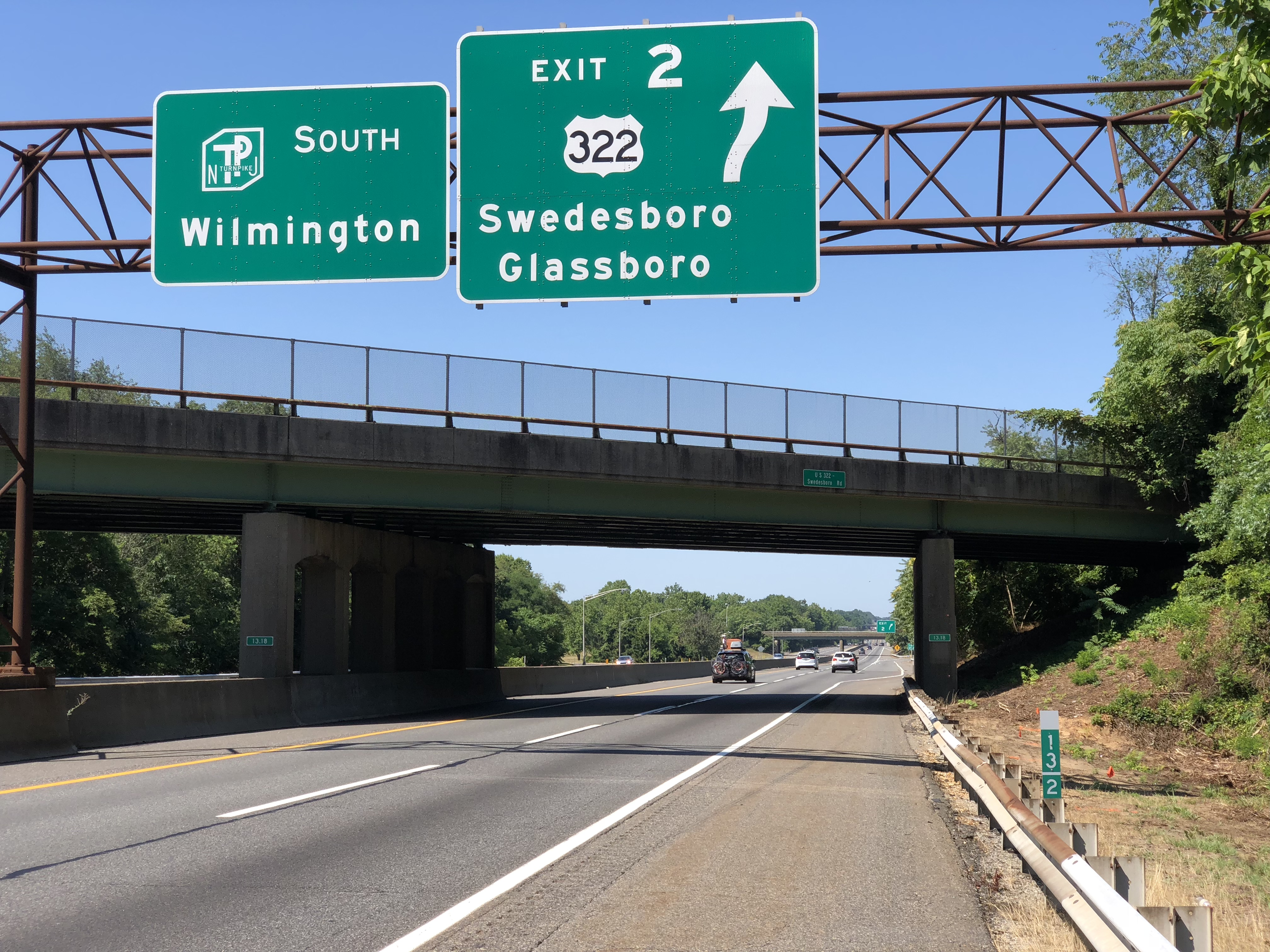
The New Jersey Turnpike southbound at Exit 2 for U.S. Route 322 in Woolwich Township

=== Roads and highways ===
As of May 2010, the township had a total of 93.31 miles (150.17 km) of roadways, of which 51.93 miles (83.57 km) were maintained by the municipality, 32.05 miles (51.58 km) by Gloucester County and 3.62 miles (5.83 km) by the New Jersey Department of Transportation and 5.71 miles (9.19 km) by the New Jersey Turnpike Authority.

Several major roadways traverse through the township. U.S. Route 322 passes through the center of the municipality while the New Jersey Turnpike passes through the southeastern part of the township for about 5.75 miles (9.25 km) and connects to Route 322 at exit 2.

Major county roads that pass through include County Road 538 and County Road 551.

Interstate 295 is accessible outside the municipality in neighboring Greenwich, Logan, Oldmans townships.

=== Public transportation ===
NJ Transit bus service between Salem and Philadelphia is available on the 401 route.

== Wineries ==
- DiBella Winery

== Community ==
In its April 2006 issue listing, "Top Places to Live in New Jersey", New Jersey Monthly magazine rated Woolwich as the worst place to live in all of New Jersey, ranking it 566th out of 566 municipalities. As of February 2008, the municipality was ranked as 547 out of 566 municipalities.

The community was labeled the "Number 1 Area Boomtown" by The Philadelphia Inquirer in 2005.

=== Historic sites ===
Gov. Charles C. Stratton House was built in 1791 and added to the National Register of Historic Places on January 29, 1973. The house was the home of New Jersey Governor Charles C. Stratton.

Moravian Church is a historic church building built in 1786 and added to the National Register of Historic Places in 1973.

Mount Zion African Methodist Episcopal Church and Mount Zion Cemetery is a historic church built in 1834 and added to the National Register of Historic Places in 2001. It played an important role in the Underground Railroad in South Jersey.

== Notable people ==
People who were born in, residents of, or otherwise closely associated with Woolwich Township include:

- Jason Babin (born 1980), defensive end for the Philadelphia Eagles
- Marlon Byrd (born 1977), baseball outfielder for the Philadelphia Phillies
- Hank Fraley (born 1977), offensive lineman for the Cleveland Browns
- Ellis Hobbs (born 1983), former cornerback for the Philadelphia Eagles
- Michael McCary (born 1971), former bass singer of the R&B group Boyz II Men
- Kenneth Lacovara (born 1961), paleontologist best known for his discovery of Dreadnoughtus
- Jason Peters (born 1982), offensive tackle for the Philadelphia Eagles
- Jimmy Rollins (born 1978), Major League Baseball shortstop especially known for his time with the Philadelphia Phillies
- Adam Taliaferro (born 1982), paralyzed former college football player who served in the New Jersey General Assembly from 2015 to 2022
