= Moravian Church (Oliphant's Mill, New Jersey) =

Historic church in New Jersey, United States

- U.S. National Register of Historic Places
- New Jersey Register of Historic Places
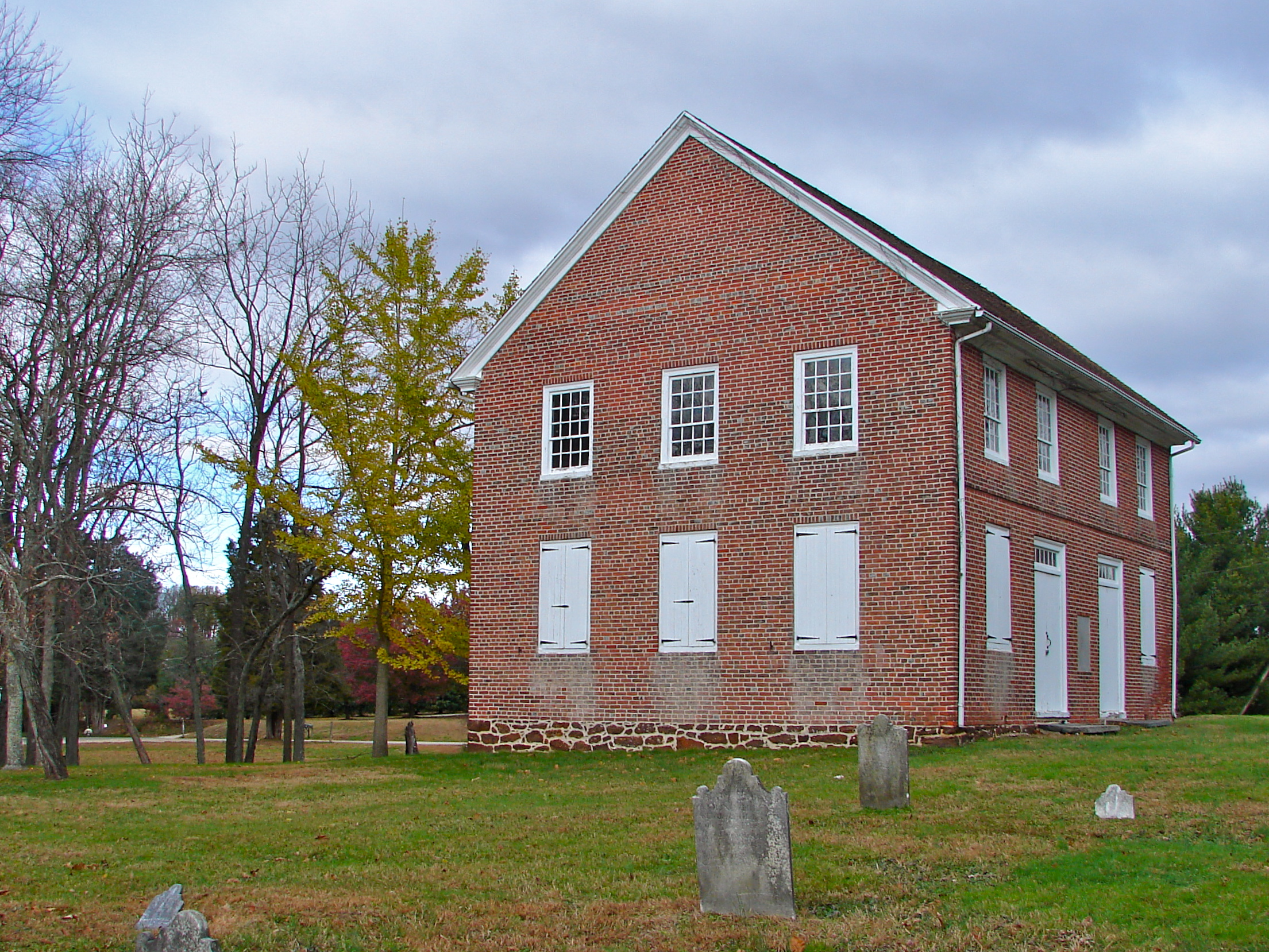
- View from the southeast

- Location within Gloucester County, New Jersey Location within New Jersey Location within the United States
- Location: Swedesboro-Sharptown Road, Woolwich Township, New Jersey
- Coordinates: 39°42′5″N 75°19′58″W
- Built: 1789
- NRHP reference No.: 73001097
- NJRHP No.: 1442

Significant dates
- Added to NRHP: April 3, 1973
- Designated NJRHP: May 1, 1972

Moravian Church is a historic church building located on Swedesboro-Sharptown Road in the Oliphant's Mill (Porches Mill) section of Woolwich Township, Gloucester County, New Jersey. The church was dedicated in 1789 and documented by the Historic American Buildings Survey (HABS) in 1938. It was added to the National Register of Historic Places on April 3, 1973, for its significance in architecture and religion. The property is currently under the stewardship of the Gloucester County Historical Society.

== History and description ==
In 1747, Moravians built a log church here, near Oldmans Creek. The current brick building was started in 1786 and dedicated in 1789. In 1836, the property was sold to the Protestant Episcopal Church of New Jersey. In 1948, the Gloucester County Historical Society purchased it.

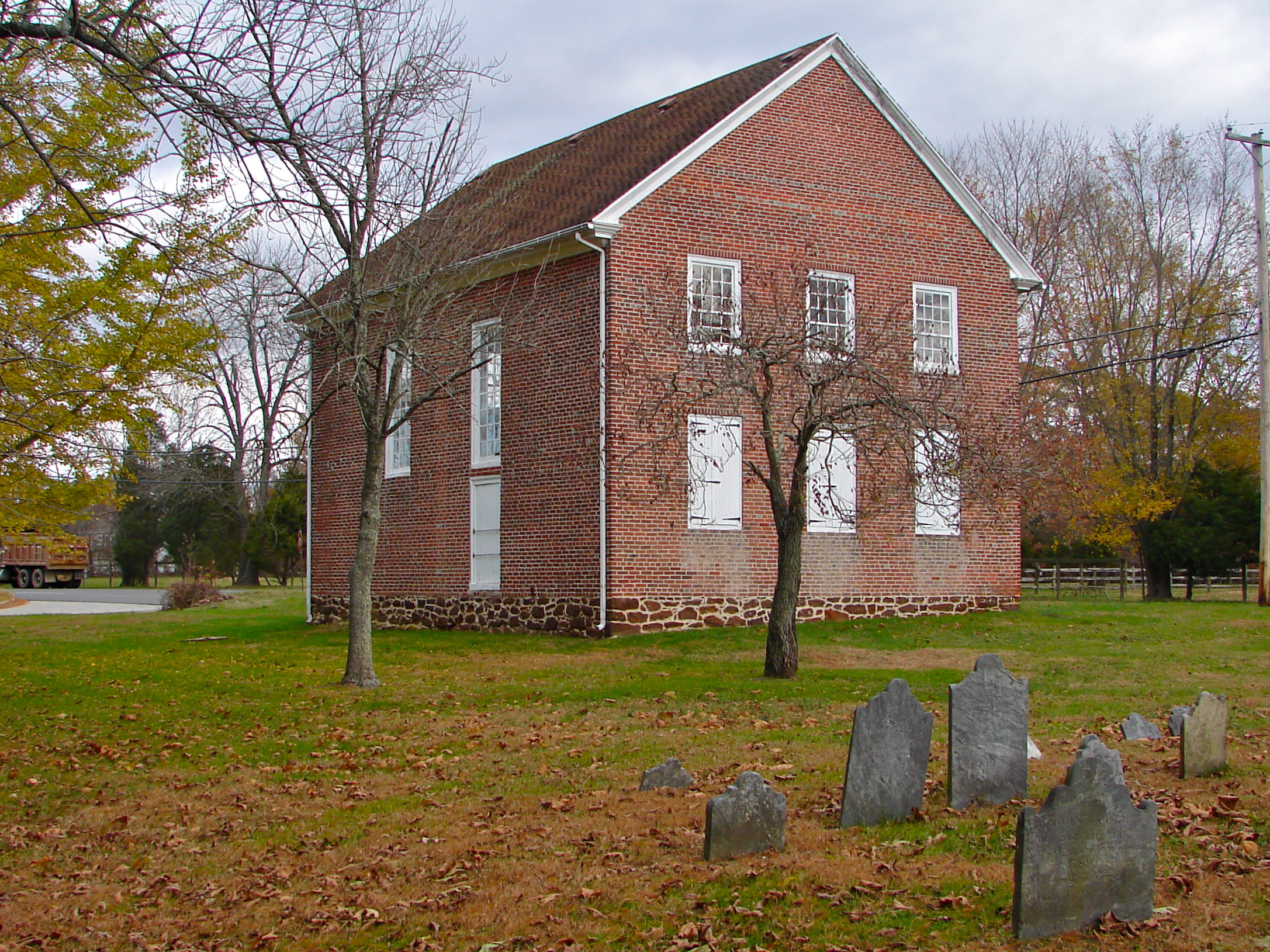
View from the southwest

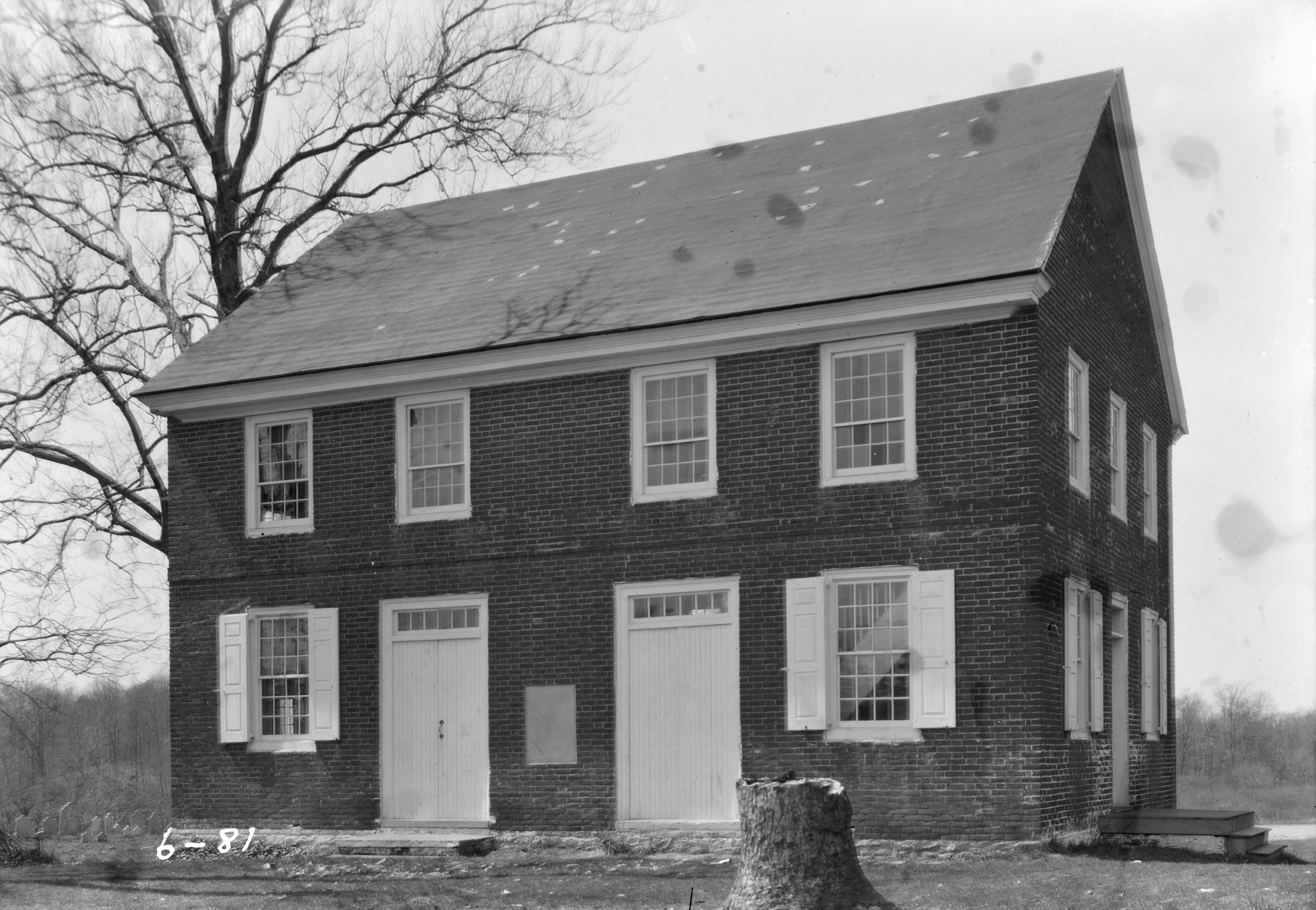
HABS photo from 1938

== See also ==
- National Register of Historic Places listings in Gloucester County, New Jersey
