= Bridgeport, New Jersey =

Populated place in Gloucester County, New Jersey, US

- Census-designated place
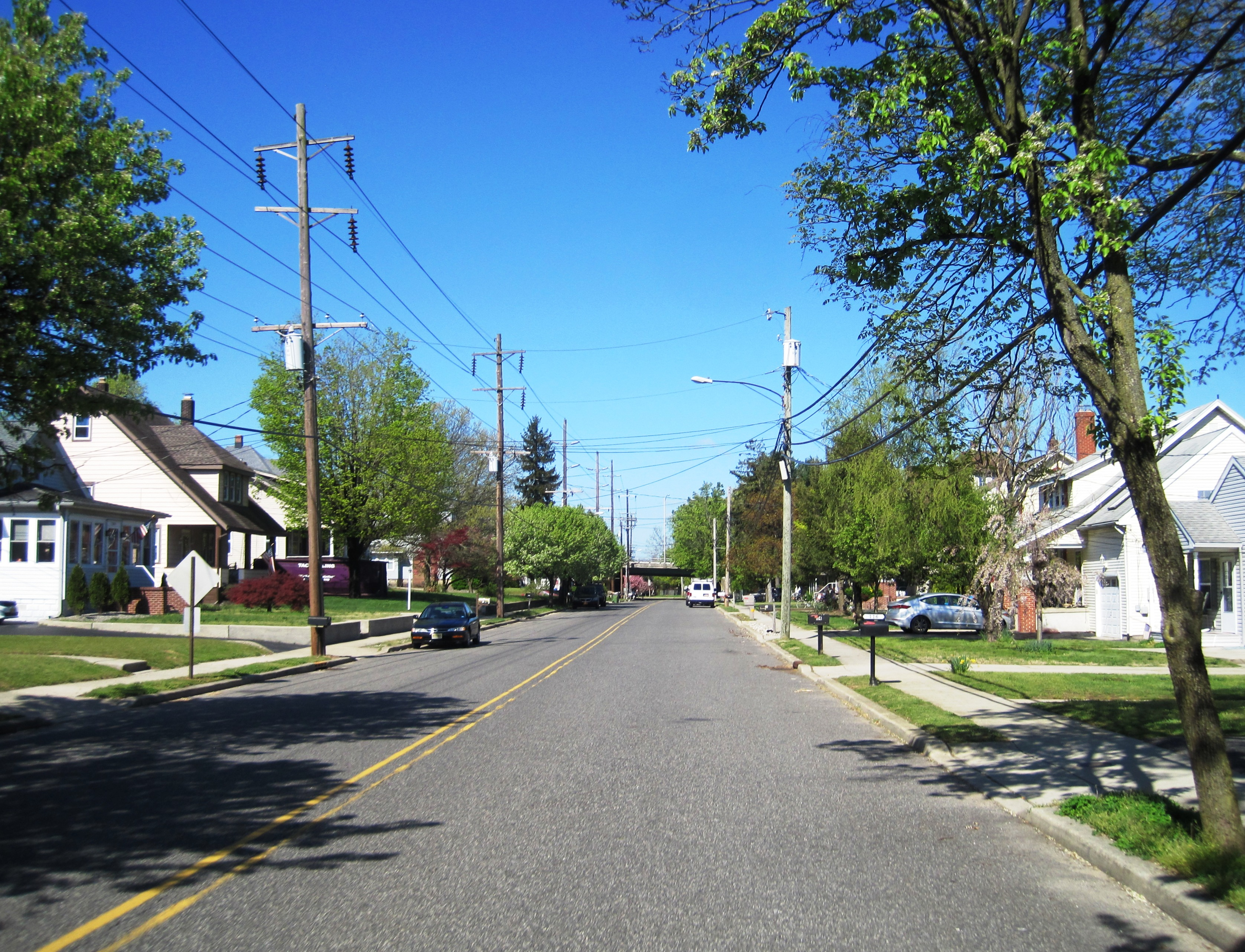
- Bridgeport as shown along Main Street in April 2021

- Location in Gloucester County Location in New Jersey Location in the United States
- Coordinates: 39°48′03″N 75°20′51″W
- Country: United States
- State: New Jersey
- County: Gloucester
- Township: Logan

Area
  - Total: 0.20 sq mi (0.52 km^{2})
  - Land: 0.20 sq mi (0.52 km^{2})
  - Water: 0 sq mi (0.00 km^{2})
- Elevation: 26 ft (7.9 m)

Population (2020)
  - Total: 389
  - Density: 1,952.0/sq mi (753.67/km^{2})
- Time zone: UTC−05:00 (Eastern (EST))
  - Summer (DST): UTC−04:00 (EDT)
- ZIP Code: 08014
- Area code: 856
- FIPS code: 34-07570
- GNIS feature ID: 874928

Bridgeport is a census-designated place (CDP) and unincorporated community that is part of Logan Township, in Gloucester County, in the U.S. state of New Jersey. At the 2020 United States census, the population of the CDP was 389. in the 2010 census, the population was 504.

The area is served as United States Postal Service ZIP Code 08014.

== History ==
Bridgeport, along with Swedesboro (Sveaborg) and Finns Point (Varkens Kill), was one of only three settlements established in New Jersey as a part of the New Sweden colony, the fort at Nya Elfsborg having been abandoned. The settlement was founded around 1650, and originally called Nya Stockholm, "New Stockholm", but the name was changed at a later date.

After the 2001 anthrax attacks, a facility was set up in Bridgeport for the use of a continuous wave accelerator called a Rhodotron, from the Belgian company IBA, to irradiate federal mail.

== Geography ==
Bridgeport lies along the Delaware River at the mouth of the Raccoon Creek. U.S. Route 322 (US 322) enters New Jersey in Bridgeport via the Commodore Barry Bridge, and continues on to cross US 130 and Interstate 295 before leaving Logan Township. Route 44 is an old alignment of US 130, beginning at a point north of US 322. Route 324 is an east-west state highway completely within Bridgeport, running from where a ferry used to take US 322 across the river to a dead end next to the current US 322. Bridgeport Motorsports Park is located in the community. There is a private marina and a small airfield in town, and a Penns Grove Secondary line crosses Raccoon Creek at the Conrail Railroad Bridge in Bridgeport at mile 2.0.

== Demographics ==
Historical population
Census	Pop.	Note	%±
2020	389		—
U.S. Decennial Census; 2020

Bridgeport CDP, New Jersey – Racial and ethnic composition Note: the US Census treats Hispanic/Latino as an ethnic category. This table excludes Latinos from the racial categories and assigns them to a separate category. Hispanics/Latinos may be of any race.
Race / Ethnicity (NH = Non-Hispanic)	Pop 2020	2020
White alone (NH)	343	88.17%
Black or African American alone (NH)	19	4.88%
Native American or Alaska Native alone (NH)	0	0.00%
Asian alone (NH)	5	1.29%
Native Hawaiian or Pacific Islander alone (NH)	0	0.00%
Other race alone (NH)	1	0.26%
Mixed race or Multiracial (NH)	8	2.06%
Hispanic or Latino (any race)	13	3.34%
Total	389	100.00%
