= Beckett, New Jersey =

Populated place in Gloucester County, New Jersey, US

- Census-designated place
- Map of Beckett highlighted within Gloucester County. Inset: Location of Gloucester County in New Jersey.

- Location in Gloucester County Location in New Jersey Location in the United States
- Coordinates: 39.750105°N 75.36482°W
- Country: United States
- State: New Jersey
- County: Gloucester
- Township: Logan

Area
  - Total: 1.80 sq mi (4.65 km^{2})
  - Land: 1.75 sq mi (4.52 km^{2})
  - Water: 0.050 sq mi (0.13 km^{2}) 6.54%
- Elevation: 30 ft (9 m)

Population (2020)
  - Total: 4,834
  - Density: 2,770.2/sq mi (1,069.58/km^{2})
- Time zone: UTC−05:00 (Eastern (EST))
  - Summer (DST): UTC−04:00 (EDT)
- FIPS code: 34-04400
- GNIS feature ID: 02389189

Beckett is an unincorporated community and census-designated place (CDP) within Logan Township, in Gloucester, in the U.S. state of New Jersey. As of the 2020 census, Beckett had a population of 4,834.

== Geography ==
According to the United States Census Bureau, the CDP had a total area of 1.866 square miles (4.83 km^{2}), including 1.744 square miles (4.52 km^{2}) of land and 0.122 square miles (0.32 km^{2}) of water (6.54%).

== Demographics ==
Historical population
| Census | Pop. | Note | %± |
|---|---|---|---|
| 1990 | 3,815 | | — |
| 2000 | 4,726 | | 23.9% |
| 2010 | 4,847 | | 2.6% |
| 2020 | 4,834 | | −0.3% |
Population sources: 1950 1960 1970; 1980 1990 2000; 2010 2020

Beckett first appeared as a census designated place in the 1990 U.S. census.

=== Racial and ethnic composition ===
Beckett CDP, New Jersey – Racial and ethnic composition Note: the US Census treats Hispanic/Latino as an ethnic category. This table excludes Latinos from the racial categories and assigns them to a separate category. Hispanics/Latinos may be of any race.
| Race / Ethnicity (NH = Non-Hispanic) | Pop 2000 | Pop 2010 | Pop 2020 | % 2000 | % 2010 | % 2020 |
|---|---|---|---|---|---|---|
| White alone (NH) | 3,671 | 3,705 | 3,542 | 77.68% | 76.44% | 73.27% |
| Black or African American alone (NH) | 743 | 707 | 615 | 15.72% | 14.59% | 12.72% |
| Native American or Alaska Native alone (NH) | 4 | 7 | 6 | 0.08% | 0.14% | 0.12% |
| Asian alone (NH) | 99 | 122 | 162 | 2.09% | 2.52% | 3.35% |
| Native Hawaiian or Pacific Islander alone (NH) | 1 | 0 | 0 | 0.02% | 0.00% | 0.00% |
| Other race alone (NH) | 2 | 12 | 13 | 0.04% | 0.25% | 0.27% |
| Mixed race or Multiracial (NH) | 63 | 95 | 191 | 1.33% | 1.96% | 3.95% |
| Hispanic or Latino (any race) | 143 | 199 | 305 | 3.03% | 4.11% | 6.31% |
| Total | 4,726 | 4,847 | 4,834 | 100.00% | 100.00% | 100.00% |

=== 2020 census ===
As of the 2020 census, Beckett had a population of 4,834. The median age was 37.9 years. 25.5% of residents were under the age of 18 and 12.2% of residents were 65 years of age or older. For every 100 females there were 94.0 males, and for every 100 females age 18 and over there were 91.0 males age 18 and over.

100.0% of residents lived in urban areas, while 0.0% lived in rural areas.

There were 1,655 households in Beckett, of which 40.5% had children under the age of 18 living in them. Of all households, 62.7% were married-couple households, 11.1% were households with a male householder and no spouse or partner present, and 20.2% were households with a female householder and no spouse or partner present. About 15.9% of all households were made up of individuals and 7.4% had someone living alone who was 65 years of age or older.

There were 1,702 housing units, of which 2.8% were vacant. The homeowner vacancy rate was 0.4% and the rental vacancy rate was 5.8%.

=== 2010 census ===
The 2010 United States census counted 4,847 people, 1,633 households, and 1,323 families in the CDP. The population density was 2,779.4 people per square mile (1,073.1 people/km^{2}). There were 1,662 housing units at an average density of 953.0 units per square mile (368.0 units/km^{2}). The racial makeup was 78.83% (3,821) White, 14.92% (723) Black or African American, 0.17% (8) Native American, 2.56% (124) Asian, 0.02% (1) Pacific Islander, 1.16% (56) from other races, and 2.35% (114) from two or more races. Hispanic or Latino of any race were 4.11% (199) of the population.

Of the 1,633 households, 43.5% had children under the age of 18; 65.3% were married couples living together; 12.2% had a female householder with no husband present and 19.0% were non-families. Of all households, 15.3% were made up of individuals and 3.5% had someone living alone who was 65 years of age or older. The average household size was 2.97 and the average family size was 3.31.

28.6% of the population were under the age of 18, 8.3% from 18 to 24, 27.9% from 25 to 44, 30.1% from 45 to 64, and 5.1% who were 65 years of age or older. The median age was 35.5 years. For every 100 females, the population had 94.2 males. For every 100 females ages 18 and older there were 88.8 males.

=== 2000 census ===
As of the 2000 United States census there were 4,726 people, 1,516 households, and 1,276 families living in the CDP. The population density was 1,030.9 people/km^{2} (2,670 people/mi^{2}). There were 1,549 housing units at an average density of 337.9 units/km^{2} (875 units/mi^{2}). The racial makeup of the CDP was 79.12% White, 15.85% African American, 0.08% Native American, 2.09% Asian, 0.02% Pacific Islander, 1.25% from other races, and 1.59% from two or more races. Hispanic or Latino of any race were 3.03% of the population.

There were 1,516 households, out of which 53.8% had children under the age of 18 living with them, 70.3% were married couples living together, 10.2% had a female householder with no husband present, and 15.8% were non-families. 12.3% of all households were made up of individuals, and 2.1% had someone living alone who was 65 years of age or older. The average household size was 3.12 and the average family size was 3.42.

In the CDP the population was spread out, with 34.3% under the age of 18, 5.8% from 18 to 24, 36.5% from 25 to 44, 20.0% from 45 to 64, and 3.3% who were 65 years of age or older. The median age was 33 years. For every 100 females, there were 96.0 males. For every 100 females age 18 and over, there were 91.4 males.

The median income for a household in the CDP was $72,156, and the median income for a family was $77,681. Males had a median income of $50,258 versus $36,863 for females. The per capita income for the CDP was $24,754. About 2.8% of families and 3.1% of the population were below the poverty line, including 3.7% of those under age 18 and 2.1% of those age 65 or over.
