= Virginia State Route 44 =

The following highways in Virginia have been known as State Route 44:

- State Route 44 (Virginia 1928-1933), Danville to Burkeville, now parts of U.S. Route 58 and State Route 49
- State Route 44 (Virginia 1933-1952), now State Route 711
- State Route 44 (Virginia 1980s), late 1960s - ca. 2000, now part of Interstate 264
