= A44 =

A44 may refer to:

- A44 road (Great Britain), a road connecting Oxford, England and Aberystwyth, Wales
- A44 motorway (Germany), a road connecting Aachen at the German–Belgian border and Kassel
- A44 motorway (Netherlands), a motorway in the Netherlands
- A44 motorway (Spain), a road connecting Bailén and until Ízbor
- A portion of the Great Western Highway in Sydney, Australia
- Benoni Defense, Encyclopaedia of Chess Openings code
