= List of highways numbered 44A =

The following highways are numbered 44A:

== India ==
- National Highway 44A (India)

== United States ==
- County Road 44A (Lake County, Florida)
- Massachusetts Route 44A (Fall River, Massachusetts)
- Nebraska Recreation Road 44A
- New York State Route 44A (former)
  - County Route 44A (Cayuga County, New York)
- Oklahoma State Highway 44A
- Vermont Route 44A
