= Logan Township, New Jersey =

Township in Gloucester County, New Jersey, US

- Township
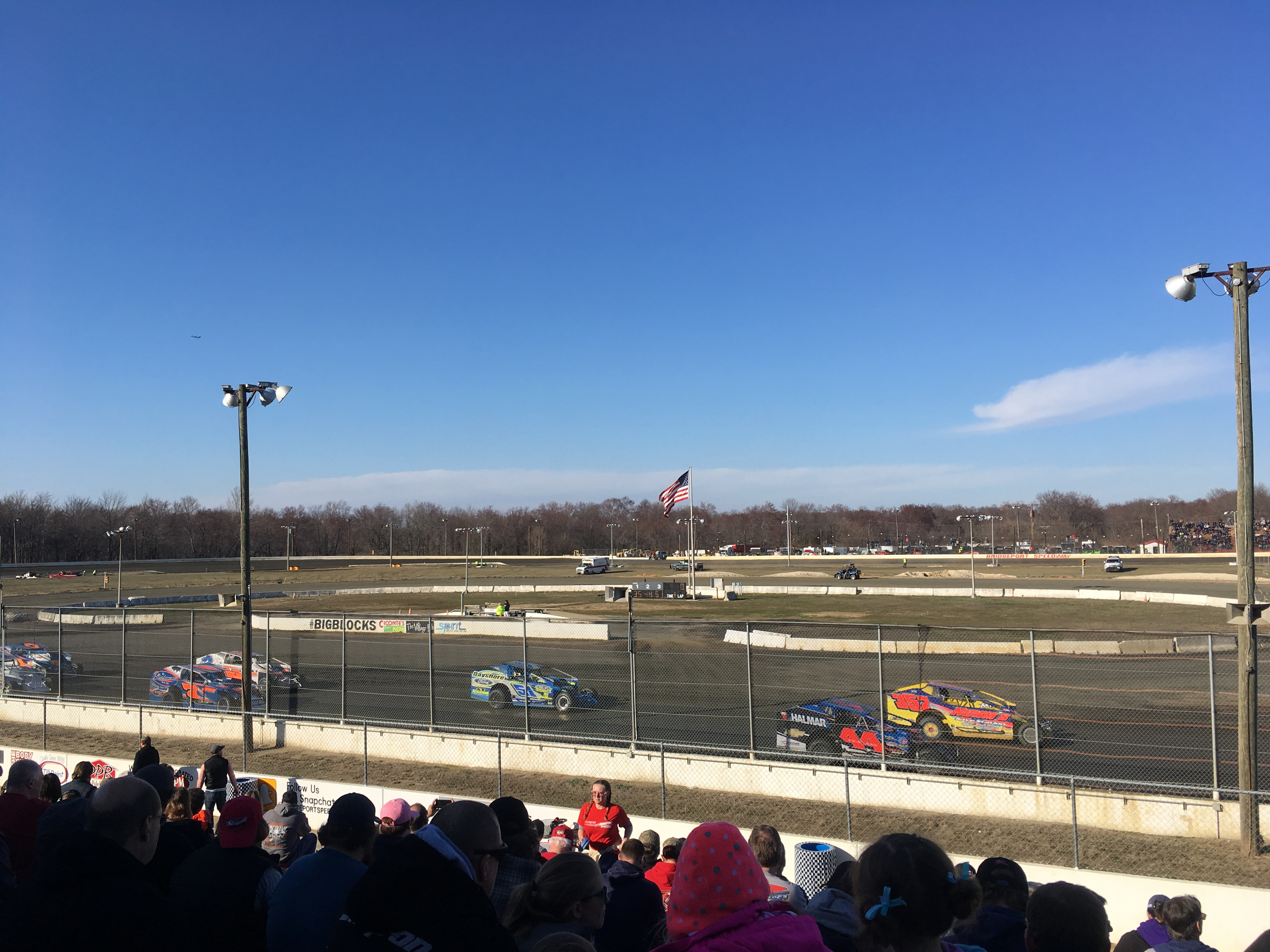
- Bridgeport Motorsports Park

- Seal

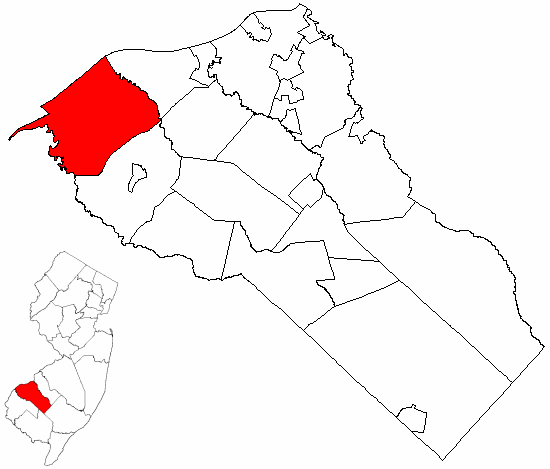
- Location of Logan Township in Gloucester County highlighted in red (right). Inset map: Location of Gloucester County in New Jersey highlighted in red (left).

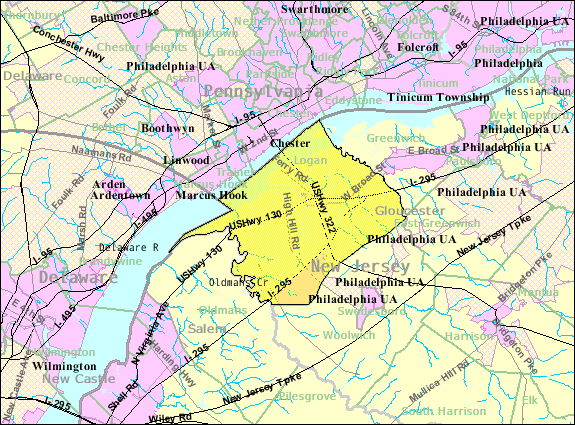
- Census Bureau map of Logan Township, New Jersey

- Location in Gloucester County Location in New Jersey Location in the United States
- Coordinates: 39.792079°N 75.355179°W
- Country: United States
- State: New Jersey
- County: Gloucester
- Incorporated: March 7, 1877 as West Woolwich Township
- Renamed: March 6, 1878 as Logan Township
- Named for: John Alexander "Black Jack" Logan

Government
  - Type: Faulkner Act (small municipality)
  - Body: Township Council
  - Mayor: Frank W. Minor (D, term ends December 31, 2027)
  - Municipal clerk: Ashley Garozzo

Area
  - Total: 26.60 sq mi (68.89 km^{2})
  - Land: 21.93 sq mi (56.79 km^{2})
  - Water: 4.67 sq mi (12.09 km^{2}) 17.55%
  - Rank: 99th of 565 in state 3rd of 24 in county
- Elevation: 3 ft (0.91 m)

Population (2020)
  - Total: 6,000
  - Estimate (2023): 6,070
  - Rank: 347th of 565 in state 15th of 24 in county
  - Density: 273.6/sq mi (105.6/km^{2})
  - Rank: 484th of 565 in state 22nd of 24 in county
- Time zone: UTC−05:00 (Eastern (EST))
  - Summer (DST): UTC−04:00 (Eastern (EDT))
- ZIP Code: 08085, 08014 Swedesboro
- Area code: 856 exchanges: 241, 467
- FIPS code: 3401541160
- GNIS feature ID: 0882143
- Website: www.logan-twp.org

Logan Township is a township in Gloucester County in the U.S. state of New Jersey. As of the 2020 United States census, the township's population was 6,000, a decrease of 42 (−0.7%) from the 2010 census count of 6,042, which in turn reflected an increase of 10 (+0.2%) from the 6,032 counted in the 2000 census.

Logan Township was formed as West Woolwich Township by the New Jersey Legislature on March 7, 1877, from portions of Woolwich Township. That name lasted just less than a year, as the name was changed to Logan Township as of March 6, 1878. The community is named for John Alexander "Black Jack" Logan, a Union Army general who was behind the establishment of Memorial Day as a national holiday.

== Geography ==
According to the U.S. Census Bureau, the township had a total area of 26.60 square miles (68.89 km^{2}), including 21.93 square miles (56.79 km^{2}) of land and 4.67 square miles (12.09 km^{2}) of water (17.55%).

Beckett (with a 2020 census population of 4,834) and Bridgeport (population 389) are unincorporated communities and census-designated places (CDP) located in the township.

Other unincorporated communities, localities, and places located partially or completely within the township include Cadwalader, Center Square, Cooper Wharf, Coopers, Flood Gates, New Bridge, Nortonville, Prospect, Raccoon Island, and Repaupo. The township is home to Pureland Industrial Complex, a 3,000-acre (12 km^{2}) industrial park that is one of the nation's largest. The township also hosts the Delaware River Equestrian Agriculture Marina (DREAM) Park, a 1,600-acre County Park.

The township borders the Gloucester County municipalities of Greenwich Township and Woolwich Township. Logan Township also borders the Delaware River. Oldmans Creek serves as its border with Oldmans Township in Salem County. Raccoon Creek branches off from the Delaware River in Logan Township.

== Demographics ==
Historical population
Census	Pop.	Note	%±
1880	1,765		—
1890	1,523		−13.7%
1900	1,444		−5.2%
1910	1,523		5.5%
1920	1,510		−0.9%
1930	1,860		23.2%
1940	1,630		−12.4%
1950	2,222		36.3%
1960	1,924		−13.4%
1970	1,840		−4.4%
1980	3,078		67.3%
1990	5,147		67.2%
2000	6,032		17.2%
2010	6,042		0.2%
2020	6,000		−0.7%
2023 (est.)	6,070		1.2%
Population sources: 1880–2000; 1880–1920 1880–1890; 1890–1910 1910–1930; 1940–2000 2000; 2010 2020

=== 2010 census ===
The 2010 United States census counted 6,042 people, 2,087 households, and 1,634 families in the township. The population density was 275.6 per square mile (106.4/km^{2}). There were 2,172 housing units at an average density of 99.1 per square mile (38.3/km^{2}). The racial makeup was 81.53% (4,926) White, 12.50% (755) Black or African American, 0.15% (9) Native American, 2.55% (154) Asian, 0.02% (1) Pacific Islander, 1.13% (68) from other races, and 2.14% (129) from two or more races. Hispanic or Latino of any race were 3.97% (240) of the population.

Of the 2,087 households, 40.2% had children under the age of 18; 62.6% were married couples living together; 11.5% had a female householder with no husband present and 21.7% were non-families. Of all households, 17.4% were made up of individuals and 4.7% had someone living alone who was 65 years of age or older. The average household size was 2.89 and the average family size was 3.29.

27.1% of the population were under the age of 18, 8.3% from 18 to 24, 27.6% from 25 to 44, 30.3% from 45 to 64, and 6.8% who were 65 years of age or older. The median age was 36.8 years. For every 100 females, the population had 96.7 males. For every 100 females ages 18 and older there were 92.6 males.

The Census Bureau's 2006–2010 American Community Survey showed that (in 2010 inflation-adjusted dollars) median household income was $87,209 (with a margin of error of +/− $6,583) and the median family income was $100,688 (+/− $14,321). Males had a median income of $67,192 (+/− $7,690) versus $49,914 (+/− $4,283) for females. The per capita income for the borough was $35,587 (+/− $2,882). About 1.6% of families and 3.7% of the population were below the poverty line, including 2.4% of those under age 18 and none of those age 65 or over.

=== 2000 census ===
As of the 2000 census, there were 6,032 people, 2,001 households, and 1,610 families residing in the township. The population density was 266.7 inhabitants per square mile (103.0/km^{2}). There were 2,077 housing units at an average density of 91.8 per square mile (35.4/km^{2}). The racial makeup of the township was 82.00% White, 13.51% African American, 0.13% Native American, 1.77% Asian, 0.02% Pacific Islander, 1.21% from other races, and 1.36% from two or more races. Hispanic or Latino of any race were 2.74% of the population.

There were 2,001 households, of which 48.1% had children under the age of 18 living with them, 66.3% were married couples living together, 10.1% had a female householder with no husband present, and 19.5% were non-families. 15.7% of all households were made up of individuals, and 4.3% had someone living alone who was 65 years of age or older. The average household size was 3.00 and the average family size was 3.38.

In the township, the population was spread out, with 32.1% under the age of 18, 6.0% from 18 to 24, 35.4% from 25 to 44, 20.3% from 45 to 64, and 6.2% who were 65 years of age or older. The median age was 34 years. For every 100 females, there were 97.3 males. For every 100 females age 18 and over, there were 93.5 males.

The median income for a household in the township was $67,148, and the median income for a family was $70,771. Males had a median income of $48,415 versus $34,864 for females. The per capita income for the township was $26,853. About 3.0% of families and 4.3% of the population were below the poverty line, including 5.3% of those under age 18 and 1.0% of those age 65 or over.

== Economy ==
Pureland Industrial Complex was established in the early 1970s when 45 farms covering 3,200 acres (1,300 ha) were assembled in Logan Township. Under the ownership of State Mutual Life Assurance Company of America, environmental studies were undertaken by Jack McCormick, the first scientist with a doctorate in environmental science. In 1971, The New York Times described the project as "the nation's first ecologically planned industrial complex".

In 1973, the Pureland Association was formed and Declaration of Environmental Standards were established and recorded in Gloucester County. Approximately 1,200 acres (490 ha) were placed in an environmental reserve in perpetuity and rigid environmental controls were established, prior to the establishment of the United States Environmental Protection Agency or the New Jersey Department of Environmental Protection. These restrictive covenants protect property owners' value and are enforced by the Pureland Association which consist of property owners.

In 1976, the initial infrastructure was established with public water, sewer, and rail servicing Pureland. In 1977, Center Square Real Estate Development Company took over management of Pureland for State Mutual Life Assurance Company of America. In 2000, Center Square Real Estate Development Company purchased the undeveloped land from State Mutual and continues to manage and develop Pureland today.

Pureland consists of 12,000,000 square feet (1,100,000 m^{2}) of space and houses more than 180 companies employing over 8,500 people, mostly in warehousing and distribution. It is the largest industrial complex in New Jersey.

Logan Township was the proposed location for the Crown Landing LNG Terminal, a liquefied natural gas (LNG) off-loading and processing facility to be sited along the Delaware River. The facility would have included an off-loading pier that would technically enter the waters of the state of Delaware. Delaware opposed the project and filed a lawsuit in federal court to stop the project from going forward on the basis that they control the waters in which part of the pier would be situated; a lawsuit the State of Delaware lost. The Federal Energy Regulatory Commission approved the Crown Landing LNG Terminal on June 15, 2006. In 2009, long after the project should have been completed, Hess Energy acquired the project after BP failed to get plans approved and construction started. On January 6, 2012, Hess Energy surrendered its authorization to construct and operate the terminal. In a letter to the Federal Energy Regulatory Commission (FERC), Hess said it determined that the terminal would not be profitable, saying that "significant increases in natural gas production from North American shale resources" would affect prices and demand for natural gas.

== Government ==
=== Local government ===
Logan Township is governed within the Faulkner Act, formally known as the Optional Municipal Charter Law, under the Small Municipality (Plan 3) form of New Jersey municipal government, enacted by direct petition as of January 1, 1984. The township is one of 18 municipalities (of the 564) statewide that use this form of government, which is only available to municipalities with less than 12,000 at the time of adoption. The governing body is comprised of a Mayor and a Township Council, with all positions elected at-large on a partisan basis as part of the November general elections. The Mayor is elected directly by the voters to a four-year term of office. The four members of the Township Council are elected to serve three-year terms on a staggered basis, with either one or two seats up for election each year.

The governing body oversees the operation of the township, passing resolutions and ordinances, as well as assessing and collecting taxes. Meetings of the Mayor and Township Council are held on a monthly basis and are open to the public. All Legislative powers of the Township are exercised by the Mayor and Council.

As of 2025, the Mayor of Logan Township is Democrat Frank W. Minor, whose term of office ends December 31, 2027. Members of the Logan Township Council are Deputy Mayor Bernadine E. Jackson (D, 2027), Shleema Lawry (D, 2025), Christopher Morris (D, 2026) and Arthur Smith (D, 2025).

=== Federal, state, and county representation ===
Logan Township is located in the 2nd Congressional District and is part of New Jersey's 3rd state legislative district.

For the 119th United States Congress, New Jersey's 2nd congressional district is represented by Jeff Van Drew (R, Dennis Township). New Jersey is represented in the United States Senate by Democrats Cory Booker (Newark, term ends 2027) and Andy Kim (Moorestown, term ends 2031).

For the 2026–2027 session, the 3rd legislative district of the New Jersey Legislature is represented in the State Senate by John Burzichelli (D, Paulsboro) and in the General Assembly by David Bailey (D, Woodstown) and Heather Simmons (D, Glassboro).

Gloucester County is governed by a board of county commissioners, whose seven members are elected at-large to three-year terms of office on a staggered basis in partisan elections, with either two or three seats coming up for election each year. At a reorganization meeting held each January, the Board selects a Director and a Deputy Director from among its members. As of 2025, Gloucester County's Commissioners are:

Director Frank J. DiMarco (D, Deptford Township, 2025), Matt Weng (D, Pitman, 2026), Joann Gattinelli (D, Washington Township, 2026), Nicholas DeSilvio (R, Franklin Township, 2027), Denice DiCarlo (D, West Deptford Township, 2025) Deputy Director Jim Jefferson (D, Woodbury, 2026) and Christopher Konawel Jr. (R, Glassboro, 2027).

Gloucester County's constitutional officers are: Clerk James N. Hogan (D, Franklin Township; 2027), Sheriff Carmel Morina (D, Greenwich Township; 2027) and Surrogate Giuseppe "Joe" Chila (D, Woolwich Township; 2028).

=== Politics ===
United States presidential election results for Logan Township 2024 2020 2016 2012 2008 2004
Year	Republican		Democratic		Third party(ies)	
Year	No.	%	No.	%	No.	%
2024	1,594	47.81%	1,676	50.27%	64	1.92%
2020	1,569	44.05%	1,931	54.21%	62	1.74%
2016	1,277	43.13%	1,554	52.48%	130	4.39%
2012	1,157	38.85%	1,779	59.74%	42	1.41%
2008	1,219	38.95%	1,868	59.68%	43	1.37%
2004	1,311	44.61%	1,600	54.44%	28	0.95%

As of March 2011, there were a total of 4,029 registered voters in Logan Township, of which 1,652 (41.0%) were registered as Democrats, 695 (17.2%) were registered as Republicans and 1,678 (41.6%) were registered as Unaffiliated. There were four voters registered as Libertarians or Greens.

Gubernatorial election results for Logan Township
Year	Republican		Democratic		Third party(ies)	
Year	No.	%	No.	%	No.	%
2025	1,147	43.91%	1,446	55.36%	19	0.73%
2021	1,005	49.61%	1,012	49.95%	9	0.44%
2017	558	35.12%	984	61.93%	47	2.96%
2013	1,041	62.64%	591	35.56%	30	1.81%
2009	939	50.51%	745	40.08%	175	9.41%
2005	744	39.22%	1,082	57.04%	71	3.74%

In the 2012 presidential election, Democrat Barack Obama received 59.7% of the vote (1,779 cast), ahead of Republican Mitt Romney with 38.9% (1,157 votes), and other candidates with 1.4% (42 votes), among the 2,997 ballots cast by the township's 4,214 registered voters (19 ballots were spoiled), for a turnout of 71.1%. In the 2008 presidential election, Democrat Barack Obama received 59.3% of the vote (1,868 cast), ahead of Republican John McCain with 38.7% (1,219 votes) and other candidates with 1.4% (43 votes), among the 3,151 ballots cast by the township's 4,142 registered voters, for a turnout of 76.1%. In the 2004 presidential election, Democrat John Kerry received 54.2% of the vote (1,600 ballots cast), outpolling Republican George W. Bush with 44.4% (1,311 votes) and other candidates with 0.7% (28 votes), among the 2,952 ballots cast by the township's 3,820 registered voters, for a turnout percentage of 77.3.

In the 2013 gubernatorial election, Republican Chris Christie received 62.6% of the vote (1,041 cast), ahead of Democrat Barbara Buono with 35.6% (591 votes), and other candidates with 1.8% (30 votes), among the 1,703 ballots cast by the township's 4,133 registered voters (41 ballots were spoiled), for a turnout of 41.2%. In the 2009 gubernatorial election, Democrat Jon Corzine received 49.8% of the vote (939 ballots cast), ahead of Republican Chris Christie with 39.5% (745 votes), Independent Chris Daggett with 8.6% (162 votes) and other candidates with 0.7% (13 votes), among the 1,886 ballots cast by the township's 4,103 registered voters, yielding a 46.0% turnout.

United States Senate election results for Logan Township1
Year	Republican		Democratic		Third party(ies)	
Year	No.	%	No.	%	No.	%
2024	1,468	45.48%	1,716	53.16%	44	1.36%
2018	1,038	44.45%	1,183	50.66%	114	4.88%
2012	1,042	36.14%	1,768	61.33%	73	2.53%
2006	851	42.85%	1,075	54.13%	60	3.02%

United States Senate election results for Logan Township2
Year	Republican		Democratic		Third party(ies)	
Year	No.	%	No.	%	No.	%
2020	1,526	43.41%	1,920	54.62%	69	1.96%
2014	530	37.88%	832	59.47%	37	2.64%
2013	375	42.09%	508	57.01%	8	0.90%
2008	1,113	37.84%	1,749	59.47%	79	2.69%

== Education ==
The Logan Township School District serves public school students in pre-kindergarten through eighth grade. As of the 2021–22 school year, the district, comprised of three schools, had an enrollment of 876 students and 82.5 classroom teachers (on an FTE basis), for a student–teacher ratio of 10.6:1. Schools in the district (with 2021–22 enrollment data from the National Center for Education Statistics) are Francis E. Donnelly Early Childhood Learning Center with 197 students in grades PreK-K, Logan Elementary School with 302 students in grades 1-4 and Logan Middle School with 372 students in grades 5-8.

Public school students in ninth through twelfth grades are educated at Kingsway Regional High School under a sending/receiving relationship in which tuition is paid on a per-pupil basis to the Kingsway Regional School District, which serves students in seventh through twelfth grades from East Greenwich Township, South Harrison Township, Swedesboro and Woolwich Township. As of the 2021–22 school year, the district, comprised of two schools, had an enrollment of 2,863 students and 231.8 classroom teachers (on an FTE basis), for a student–teacher ratio of 12.4:1. Schools in the district (with 2021–22 enrollment data from the National Center for Education Statistics) are Kingsway Regional Middle School with 925 students in grades 7-8 and Kingsway Regional High School with 1,893 students in grades 9-12. Under a 2011 proposal, Kingsway would merge with its constituent member's K–6 districts to become a full K–12 district, with various options for including Logan Township as part of the consolidated district.

Students from across the county are eligible to apply to attend Gloucester County Institute of Technology, a four-year high school in Deptford Township that provides technical and vocational education. As a public school, students do not pay tuition to attend the school. There are 60 students from the township who attend GCIT.

Guardian Angels Regional School (PreK–Grade 3 campus in Gibbstown CDP and 4–8 campus in Paulsboro) takes students from Logan Township. The school operates under the supervision of the Roman Catholic Diocese of Camden.

== Transportation ==
=== Roads and highways ===
As of May 2010, the township had a total of 72.03 miles (115.92 km) of roadways, of which 32.76 miles (52.72 km) were maintained by the municipality, 19.01 miles (30.59 km) by Gloucester County, 18.04 miles (29.03 km) by the New Jersey Department of Transportation and 2.22 miles (3.57 km) by the Delaware River Port Authority.

Several state highways pass through the township. These include U.S. Route 130, U.S. Route 322/County Route 536, Route 324, which runs for 1.5 miles (2.4 km) entirely in Logan Township, and Interstate 295.

The Commodore Barry Bridge is a cantilever bridge that spans the Delaware River from Chester, Pennsylvania to the Bridgeport section of Logan Township as part of US 322. Owned and operated by the Delaware River Port Authority, construction of the bridge began in 1969 and the bridge opened to traffic in February 1974. The bridge is named for the American Revolutionary War hero and Philadelphia resident, John Barry.

=== Public transportation ===
NJ Transit bus service is available between in the township between Pennsville Township and Philadelphia on the 402 route.

== Notable people ==
People who were born in, residents of, or otherwise closely associated with Logan Township include:

- Edward Durr (born 1963), politician and truck driver who represented the 3rd Legislative district in the New Jersey Senate from 2022 to 2024

== Wineries ==
- Cedarvale Winery
