= New York State Route 44 =

New York State Route 44 may refer to:

- New York State Route 44 (1920s–1930) in the Southern Tier and Central New York
- New York State Route 44 (1930–1935) in the Finger Lakes region
- U.S. Route 44 in New York, the only route numbered "44" in New York since the mid-1930s
