= Commodore Barry Bridge =

Bridge in New Jersey and Pennsylvania

Commodore John Barry Bridge
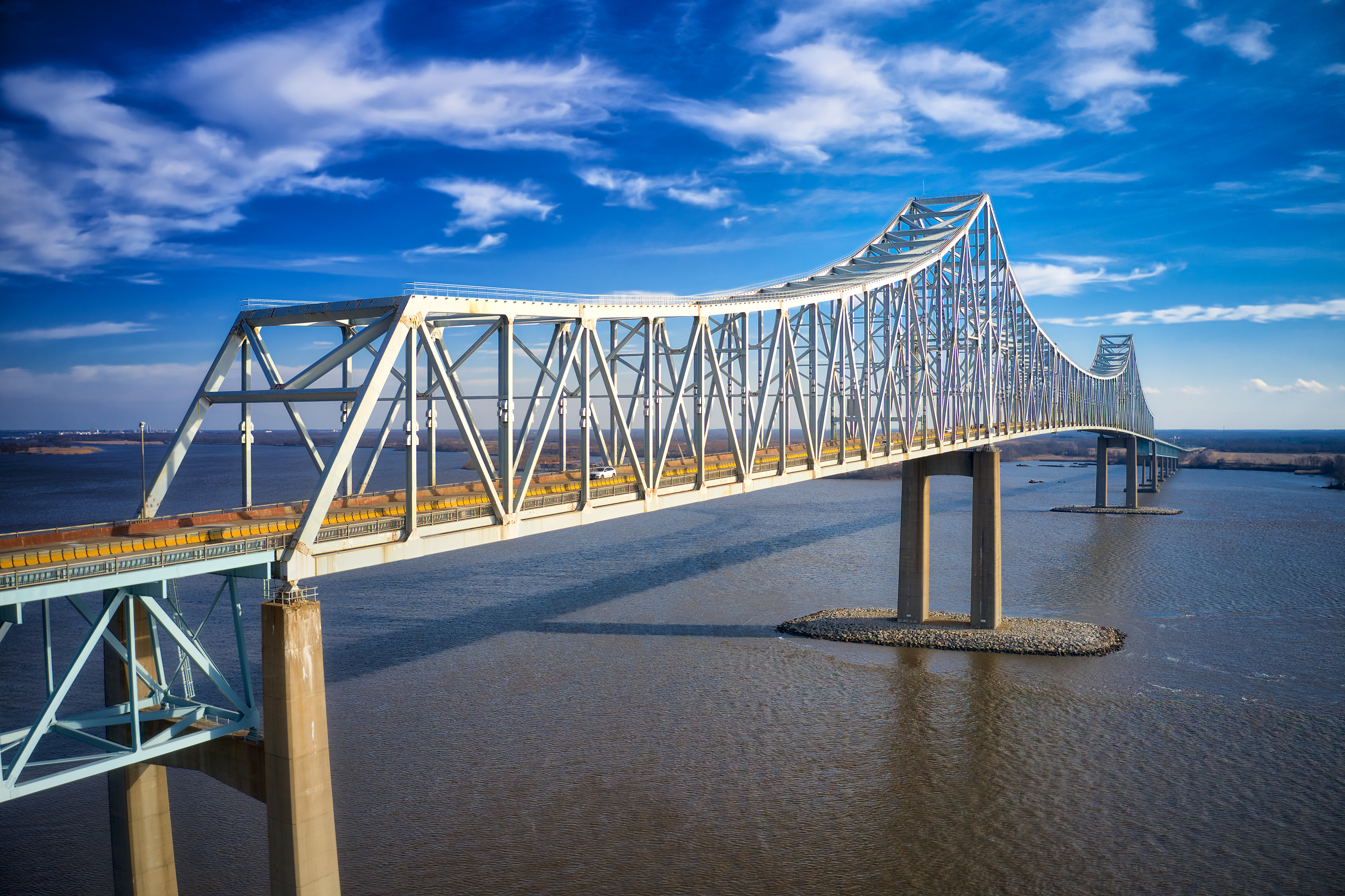
- Commodore Barry Bridge crossing the Delaware River from Chester, Pennsylvania to Logan Township, New Jersey (background)
- Coordinates: 39°49′32″N 75°22′06″W
- Carries: 5 lanes of US 322 (full length)
- Crosses: Delaware River
- Locale: Chester, Pennsylvania to Bridgeport, New Jersey
- Maintained by: Delaware River Port Authority of Pennsylvania and New Jersey

Characteristics
- Design: Steel cantilever bridge
- Total length: 13,912 feet (4,240 meters)
- Width: 77 feet (23 meters)
- Longest span: 1,644 feet (501 meters)
- Clearance below: 192 feet (59 meters)

History
- Construction cost: $115 million
- Opened: February 1, 1974; 51 years ago

Statistics
- Daily traffic: 35,000
- Toll: $6.00 (westbound) (E-ZPass)

Location
- Interactive map of Commodore John Barry Bridge

The Commodore John Barry Bridge (commonly known as the Commodore Barry Bridge or simply the Commodore Barry) is a cantilever bridge that spans the Delaware River from Chester, Pennsylvania to Bridgeport, New Jersey, in Logan Township. It is named after John Barry, an American Revolutionary War hero and Philadelphia resident.

Along with the Betsy Ross Bridge, the Ben Franklin Bridge and the Walt Whitman Bridge, the Commodore Barry Bridge is one of the four toll bridges connecting the metropolitan Philadelphia region with southern New Jersey owned by the Delaware River Port Authority. Originally designed to connect with a now-cancelled freeway, the limited-access bridge has recently been retrofitted to better serve the local area. Between 2007 and 2011, both the Delaware River Port Authority and the Pennsylvania Department of Transportation, in conjunction with the Chester Redevelopment Authority, built a pair of entrance-exit ramps that allowed motorists, primarily heavy truck traffic, to access the Chester Waterfront, via PA 291 and Flower Street (via West 9th Street (US 13)) from I-95. Other improvements, such as deck joint replacement, concrete patching (on the approaches), and other safety and engineering improvements are either ongoing or have been completed.

The bridge replaced the Chester–Bridgeport Ferry, a ferry service that from July 1, 1930 to February 1, 1974, was the sole means of crossing the Delaware River from Delaware County, Pennsylvania to Gloucester County, New Jersey. The Chester side of the ferry service experienced the Wade Dump fire and SuperFund cleanup, and has since become the city-owned Barry Bridge Park with the adjacent Subaru Park (home of the Major League Soccer's Philadelphia Union franchise) being opened in 2010.

== History ==
Construction of the bridge began on April 14, 1969, and it opened to traffic on February 1, 1974. It has a total length of 13,912 feet (4,240 m), and a main span of 1,644 feet (501 m), making the bridge the fourth longest cantilever bridge in the world, and the longest in the United States. The road has a total of five lanes, divided by a zipper barrier, which was added to the bridge in 2002, in which a machine can configure the number of lanes in each direction, depending upon traffic volume or construction. The bridge is designated as part of US 322 and has direct connections with PA 291 (West 2nd Street), US 13 (West 9th Street) and I-95 in Chester and US 130 in Bridgeport, with a connection to I-295 and the New Jersey Turnpike within a 5-mile (8.0 km) radius of the bridge.

Originally created to be a connection to one of the then-proposed freeways in New Jersey, the Commodore Barry Bridge was to connect I-95 near Chester to, at one point, the Atlantic City Expressway near Hammonton, but those plans were eventually scrapped when it was realized that many people in the college town of Glassboro would be affected. There are new talks of possibly upgrading US 322 to a freeway from US 130 to I-295's current Exit 11, or even as far as the New Jersey Turnpike's Exit 2. There is no mention if this new freeway would be included in the Interstate Highway System, though it hasn't been ruled out yet, either.

On February 2, 1978, an intense fire broke out at Wade Dump, a rubber recycling facility and illegal industrial chemical dumping site almost directly under the bridge. The heat, rising flames and noxious fumes shut down the bridge temporarily. The burning chemicals injured 43 firemen and caused long-term health problems for the first responders to the fire. In 1981, the location was declared a Superfund cleanup site and remediation occurred throughout the 1980s. In 1989, the site was deemed safe and removed from the Superfund national priorities list. In 2004 the site was converted to a parking lot for the nearby Barry Bridge Park.

== Tolls ==
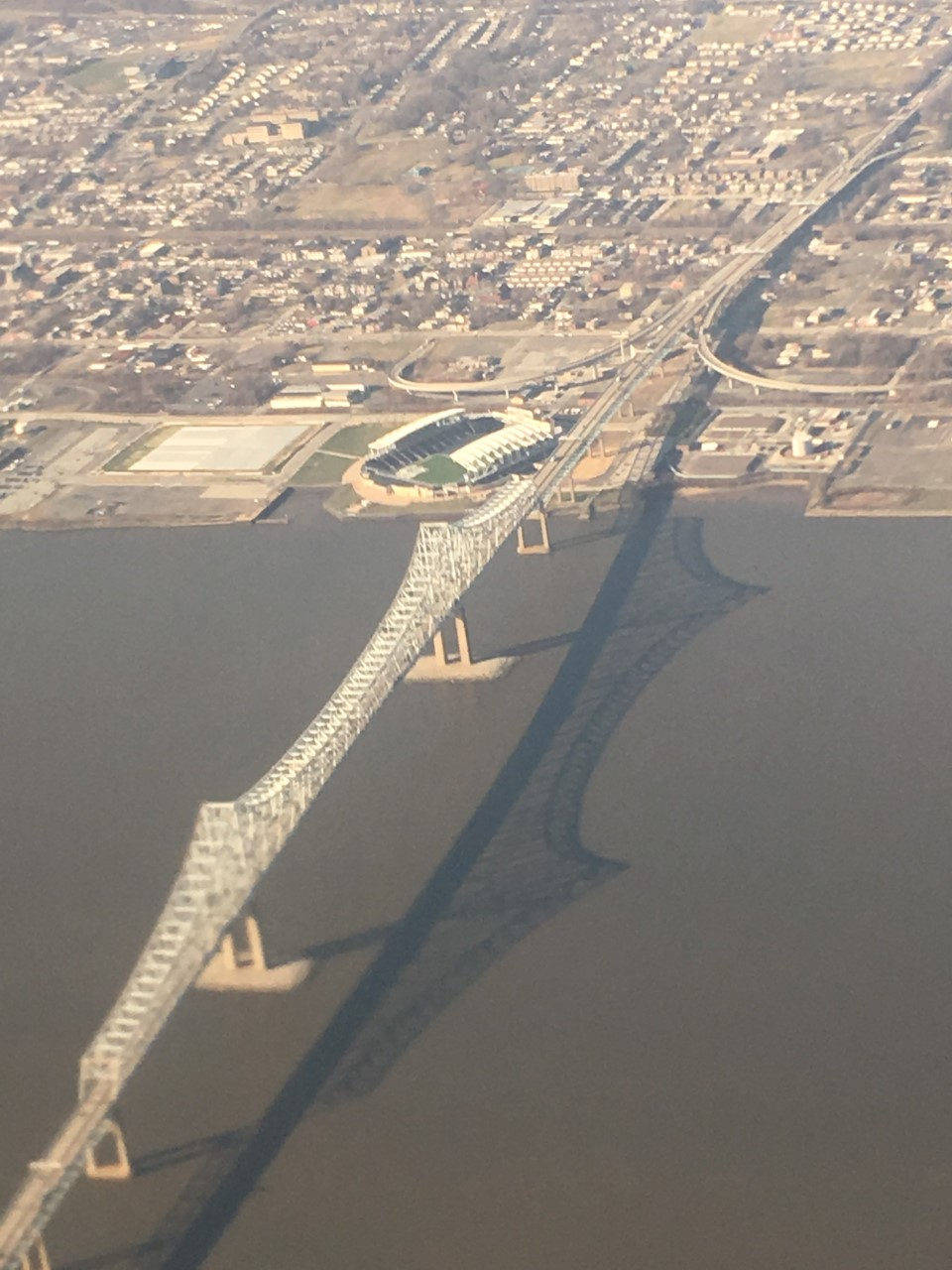
An aerial view of the Commodore Barry Bridge

A $6.00 one-way toll is charged entering Pennsylvania for passenger vehicles less than or equal to 7,000 lb (3,200 kg) gross vehicle weight and SUVs. A $18 credit will be given on a per tag basis for any New Jersey-issued E-ZPass tag that crosses one of the four DRPA bridges 18 times in a calendar month. Trucks, commercial vehicles, mobile homes and recreation vehicles (weighing at least 7,001 lb (3,176 kg) gross vehicle weight), pay $9.00 cash per axle. Seniors aged 65 and over with an NJ E-ZPass can use a discount program to pay $3.00 per trip.

On July 17, 2024, the Delaware River Port Authority approved an increase in the toll for passenger vehicles from $5.00 to $6.00, which went into effect on September 1, 2024.

== See also ==
- List of crossings of the Delaware River
