= Salem Port =

Salem Port may refer to:

- Port of Salem, New Jersey
- Salem Harbor, Massachusetts
