= Port of Camden =

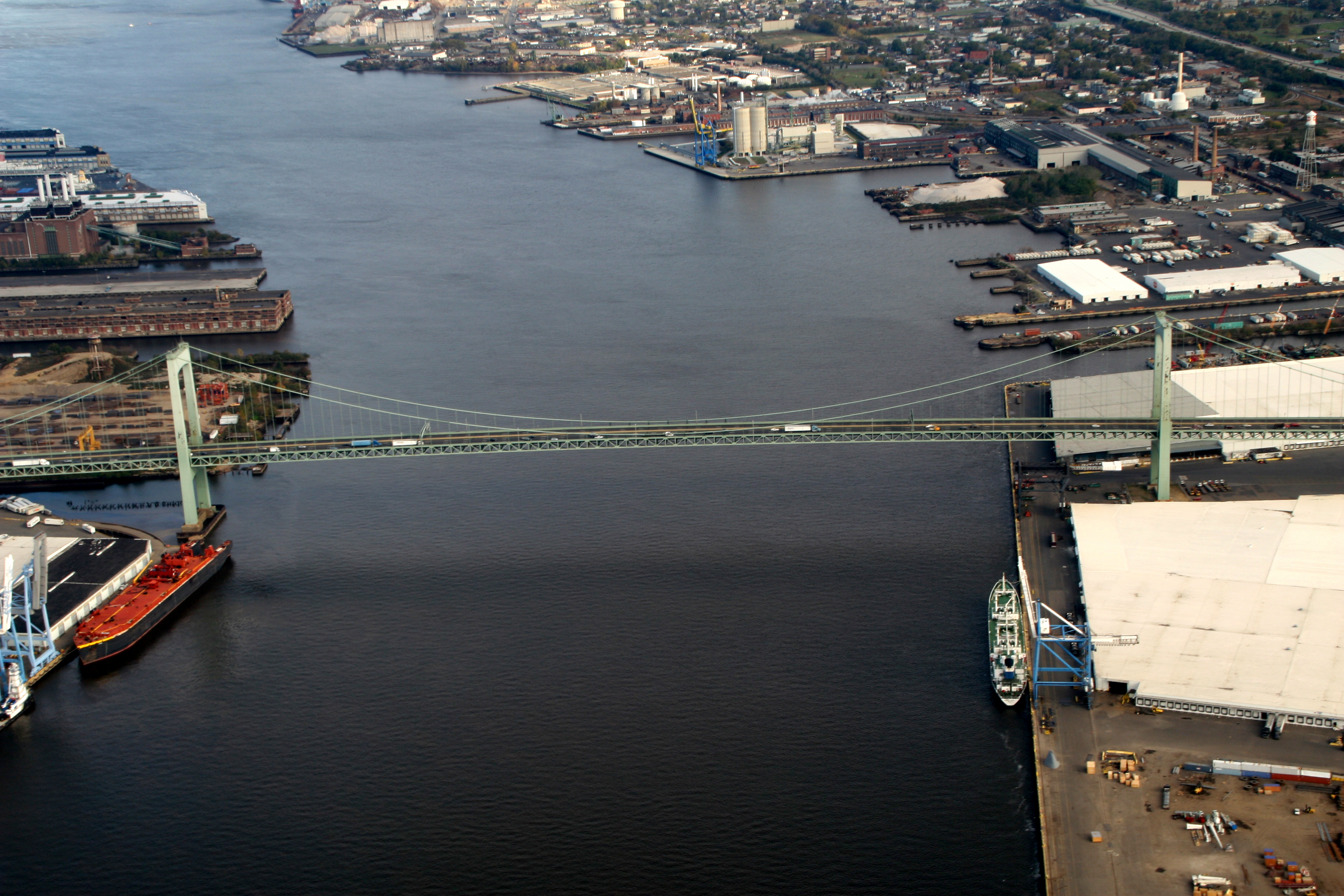
- Walt Whitman Bridge crossing the Delaware River with port facilities of Camden-Gloucester at right and Philadelphia at left
- Interactive map of Port of Camden

Location
- Country: United States
- Location: Camden–Gloucester City, New Jersey
- Coordinates: 39.9208439°N 75.1261562°W

Details
- Draft depth: 45 feet
- Air draft: 150 feet

The Port of Camden is on the east bank of the Delaware River in Camden and Gloucester City in southern New Jersey. It is one of several ports in the Delaware Valley metro area port complex and is near the mouth of Newtown Creek opposite the Port of Philadelphia. The port is one of the nation's largest for wood products, steel, cocoa and perishable fruit.

== Shipping channel, air draft, port of entry ==
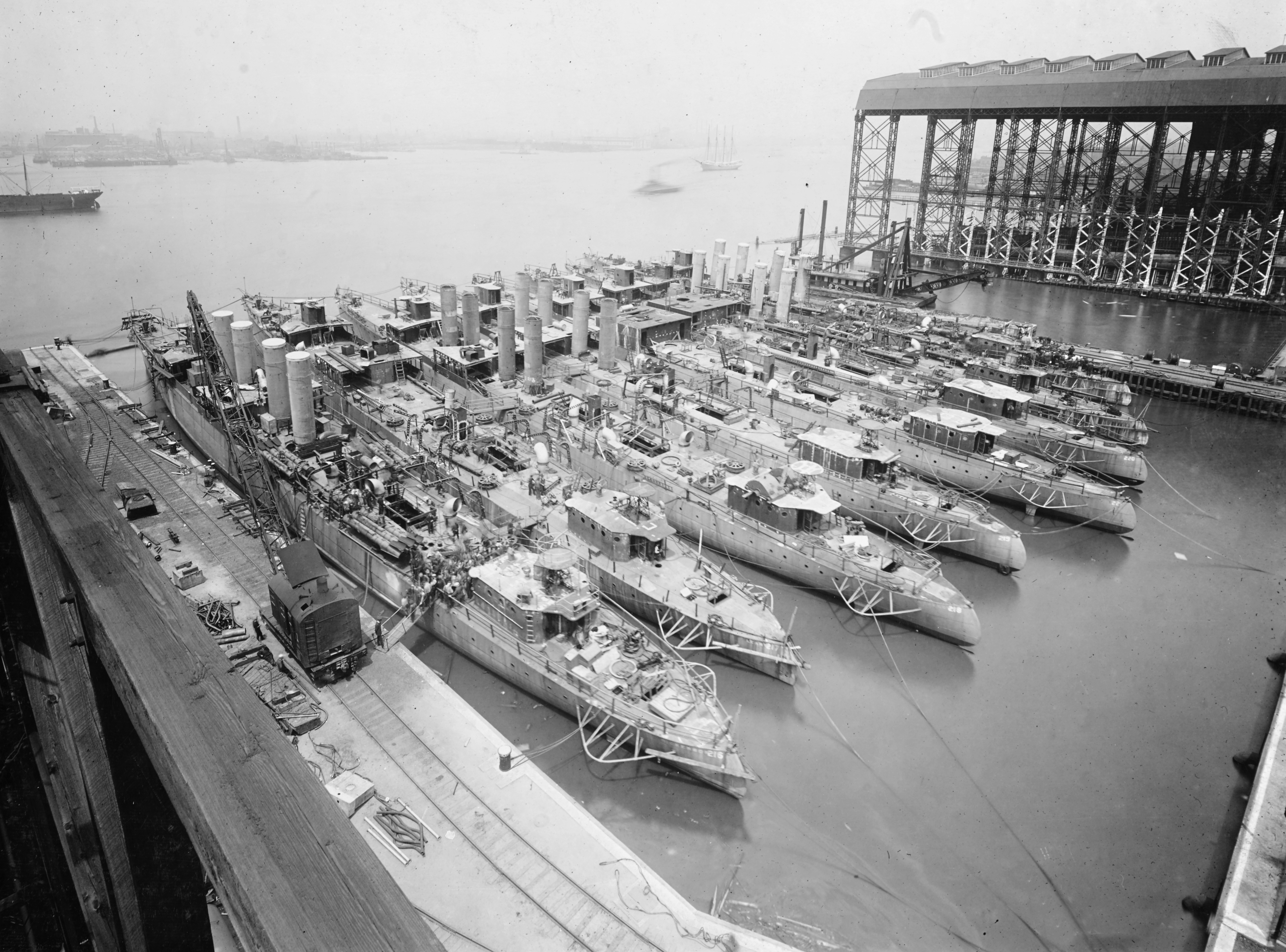
New York Shipbuilding

The port is approximately 102 miles (164 km) from the Atlantic Ocean at the entrance to the Delaware Bay. After 1942, the Delaware River Main Channel was maintained at a depth of 40 feet (12 m). In a project completed in 2017, the federal navigation shipping channel from Camden/Philadelphia was deepened to 45 feet (14 m). Local pilotage is generally required for larger commercial vessels.

The air draft of the port is 150 feet, restricted by the Walt Whitman Bridge. Downstream of the bridge air draft is 188 feet, restricted by Delaware Memorial Bridge

It is a port of entry in United States Citizenship and Immigration Services (USCIS) District 21, which covers New Jersey.

The Delaware River port complex refers to the ports and energy facilities along the river in the tri-state PA-NJ-DE Delaware Valley region. They include the Port of Salem, the Port of Wilmington, the Port of Chester, the Port of Paulsboro, the Port of Philadelphia and the Port of Camden. Combined they create one of the largest shipping areas of the United States. In 2016, 2,427 ships arrived at Delaware River port facilities: Fruit ships were counted at 577, petroleum at 474, and containerized cargo at 431.

== Historical shipbuilding and ferries ==
Both New York Shipbuilding and Dialogue & Company were in the port. Much of the current port operations are on what were once shipyards. Dialogue & Company was further upstream. John H. Mathis & Company was a shipbuilding company founded around 1900, based at Cooper Point. Penn-Jersey Shipbuilding Corp. was also at Cooper Point.

The United States lightship Barnegat (LV-79), built in the city, is in Cooper Point, and is considered threatened.

Ferry service between Camden and Philadelphia existed for 264 years. The first commercial crossing of the Delaware was first established in 1688; the last ferry to depart the city was in 1952. The seasonal RiverLink Ferry was established in 1999.

== Operations and facilities ==
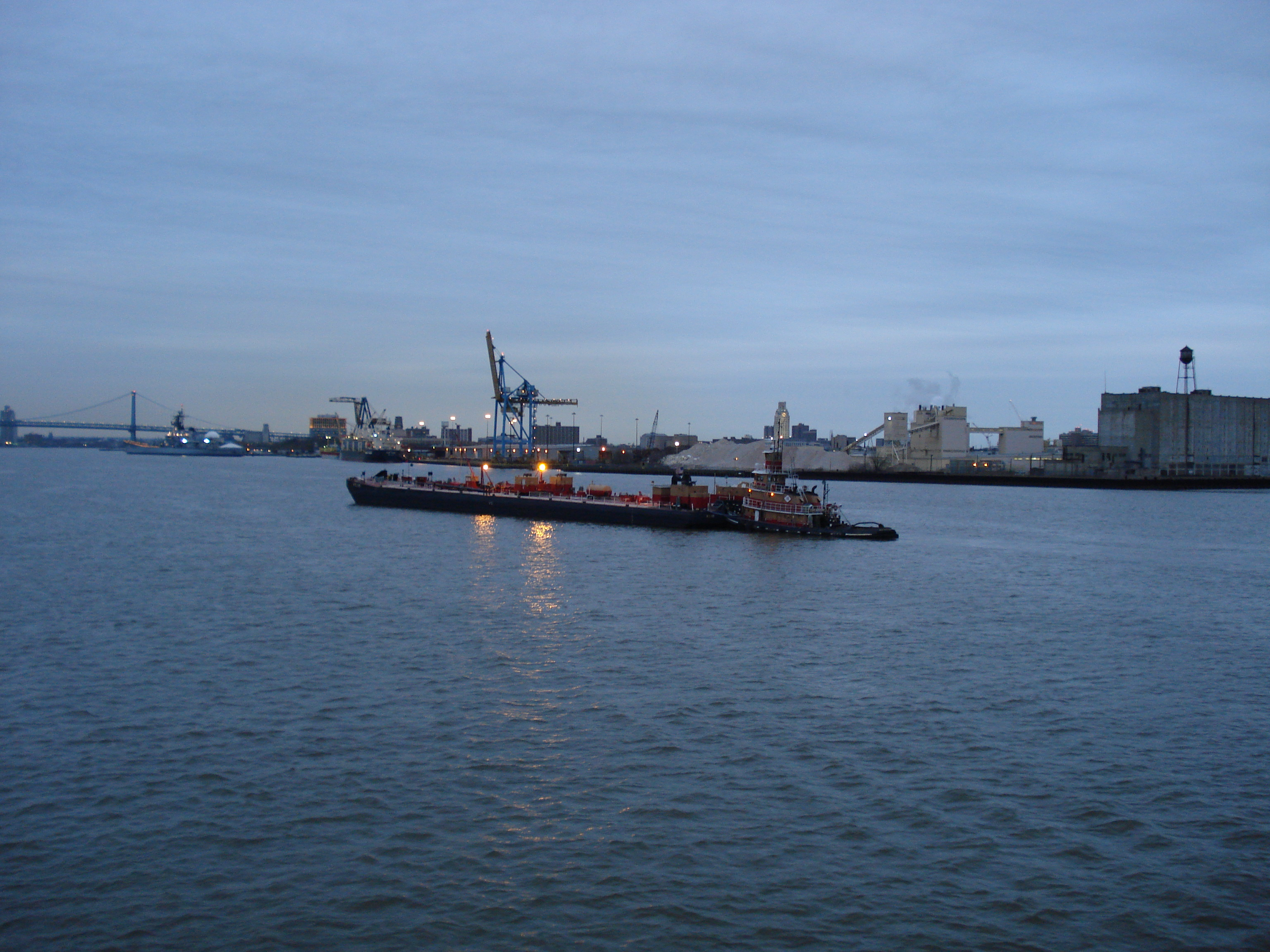
Balzano Marine Terminal

The semi-public South Jersey Port Corporation (SJPC) oversees a number of facilities, for which the Delaware River Stevedores handle much of the traffic. Additionally there are other privately run facilities in the port, including those of Holt Logistics, Joseph Oat Corporation, Holtech International, Mafco, EMR subsidiary Camden Iron and Steel and Camden Yards Steel. The Camden County MUA maintains a large treatment plant on the waterfront.

=== South Jersey Port Corporation ===
Marine terminals operated by South Jersey Port Corporation (SJPC), which also oversees the Port of Paulsboro and the Port of Salem:

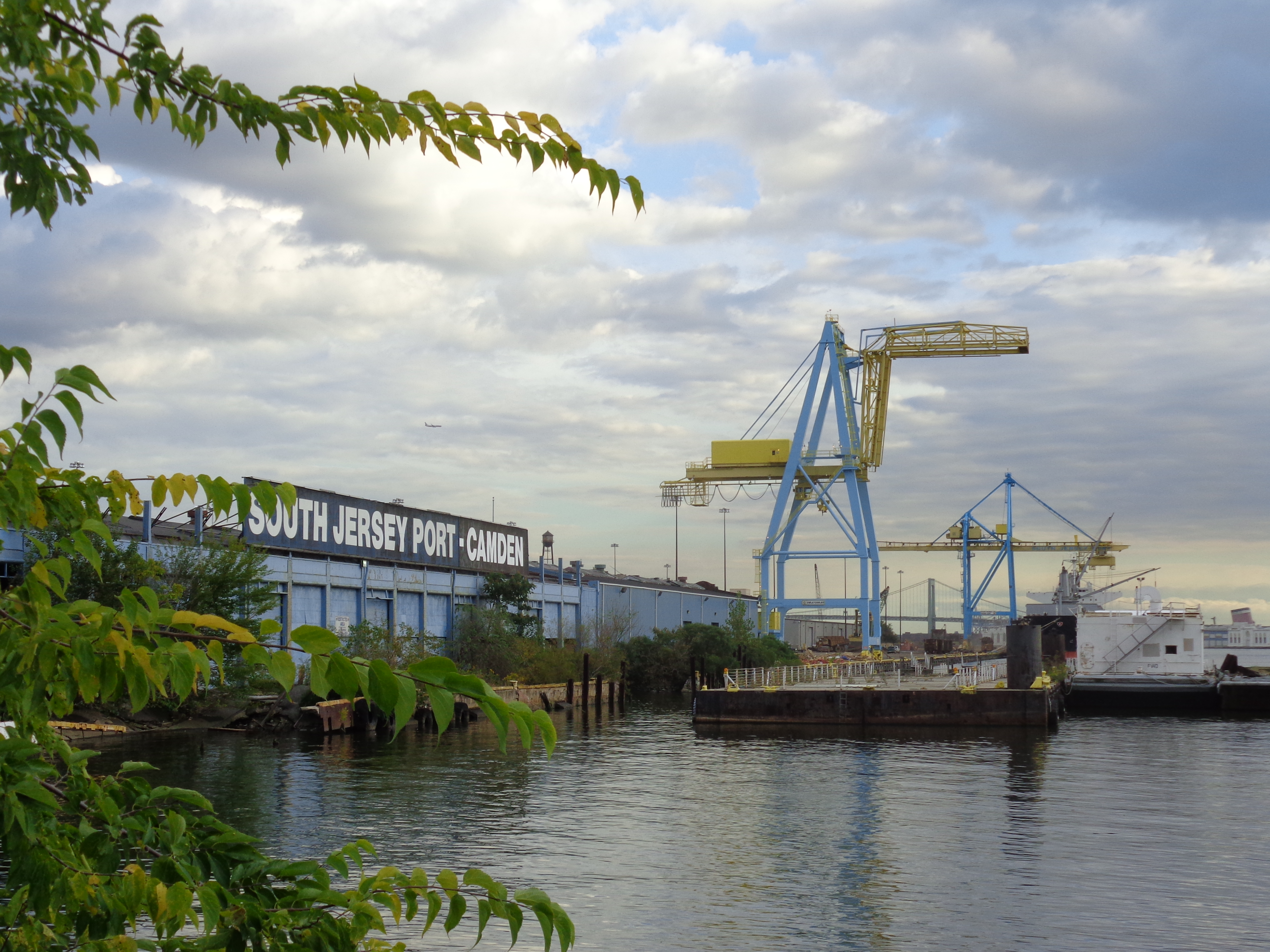
Balzano Terminal

- Balzano Terminal (formerly the Beckett Street Terminal) is a 122-acre (49 ha) bulk and break bulk cargo complex that handles wood products, steel products, cocoa beans, containers, iron ore, furnace slag, scrap metal and containerized cargo
- Broadway Terminal is a 180-acre (73 ha) complex that handles petroleum coke, furnace slag, dolomite, other dry bulk items, steel products, wood products, minerals, cocoa beans, fresh fruit as well as containerized cargo.

=== Holt Logistics and Holtec ===
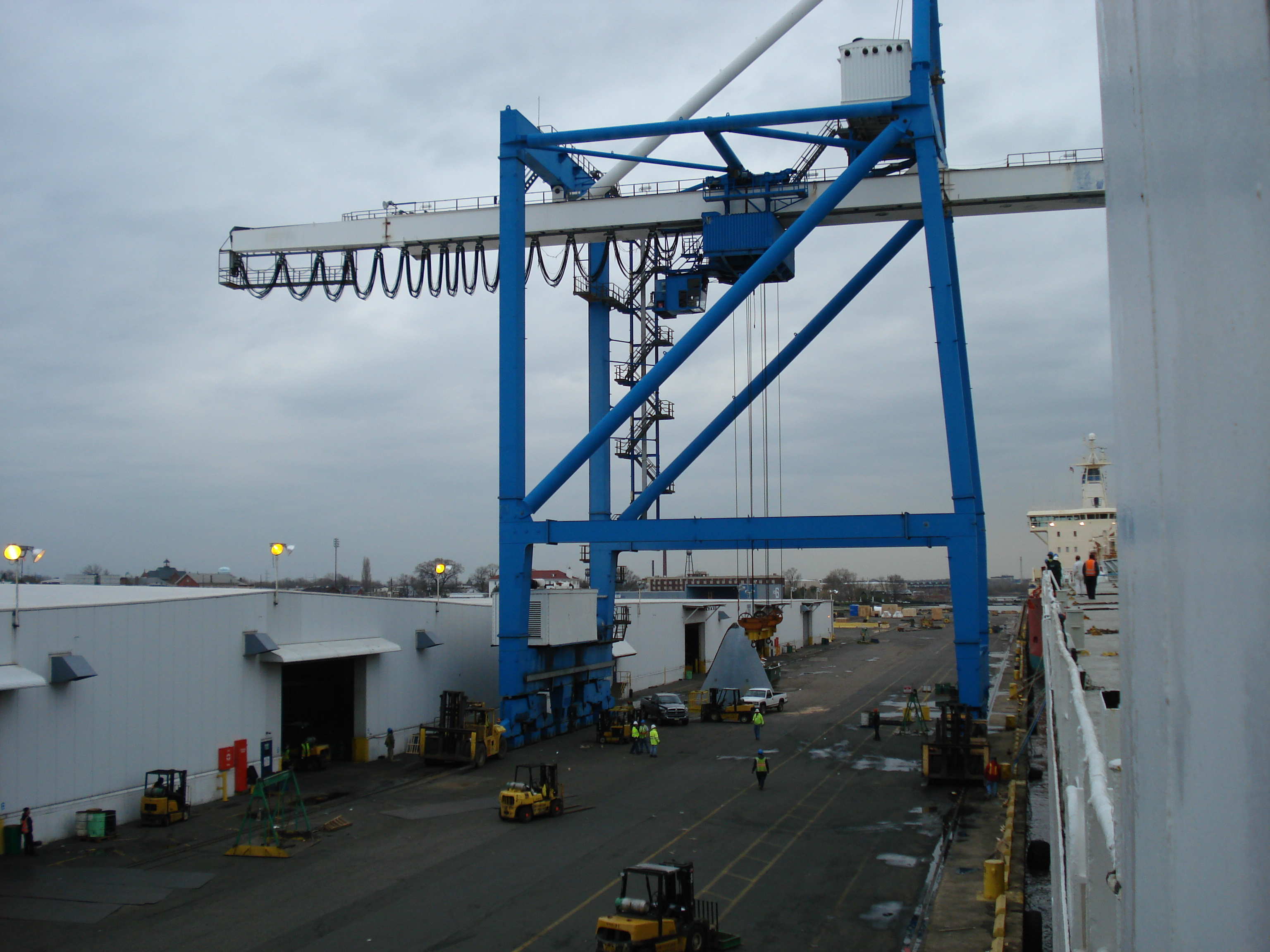
Gloucester Marine Terminal

Holt Logistics operates terminals in the port

- Pier 5 Broadway Produce Terminal 28 Acres (11.3 ha) with a three reefer-building complex that handles bananas, pineapples, and other perishables
- Gloucester Marine Terminal is a 150-acre (61 ha) site which features the largest refrigerated capacity of any terminal in the United States and the largest rooftop photovoltaic installations in the USA It has four deep water berths and 12 dry/heated warehouses with more than 1,000,000 square feet of space and 13 reefer/frozen warehouses with 15 million cubic feet of space. Del Monte has been a presence in the port since 1989 and since 2010 a Gloucester.
- Holtec International operates it corporate offices from new facilities from a 600,000-square-foot facility at the Broadway Terminal. In July 2014, the New Jersey Economic Development Authority awarded the company a $260 million tax incentive to expand operations.

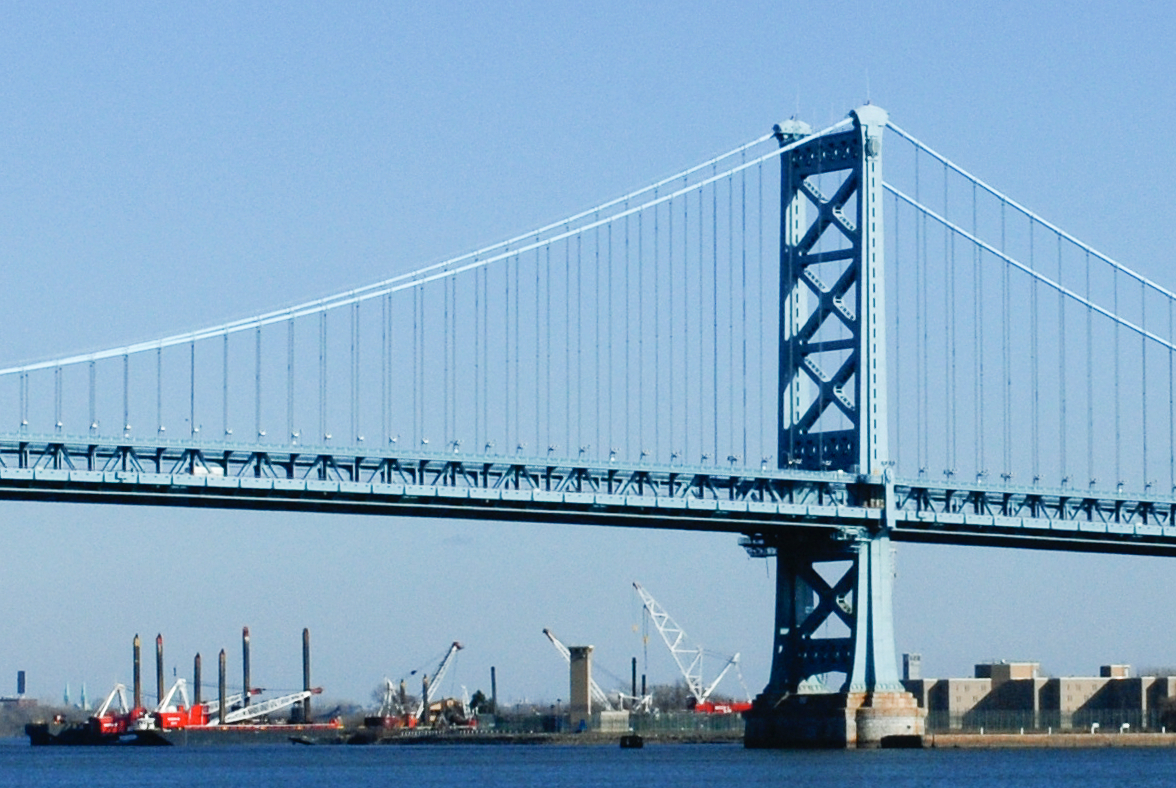
Weeks Marine upstream from Benjamin Franklin Bridge

=== Weeks Marine ===
Weeks Marine, a maritime salvage, construction, and transportation company, maintains facilities upstream of the Benjamin Franklin Bridge at Pyne Point

== Road ==
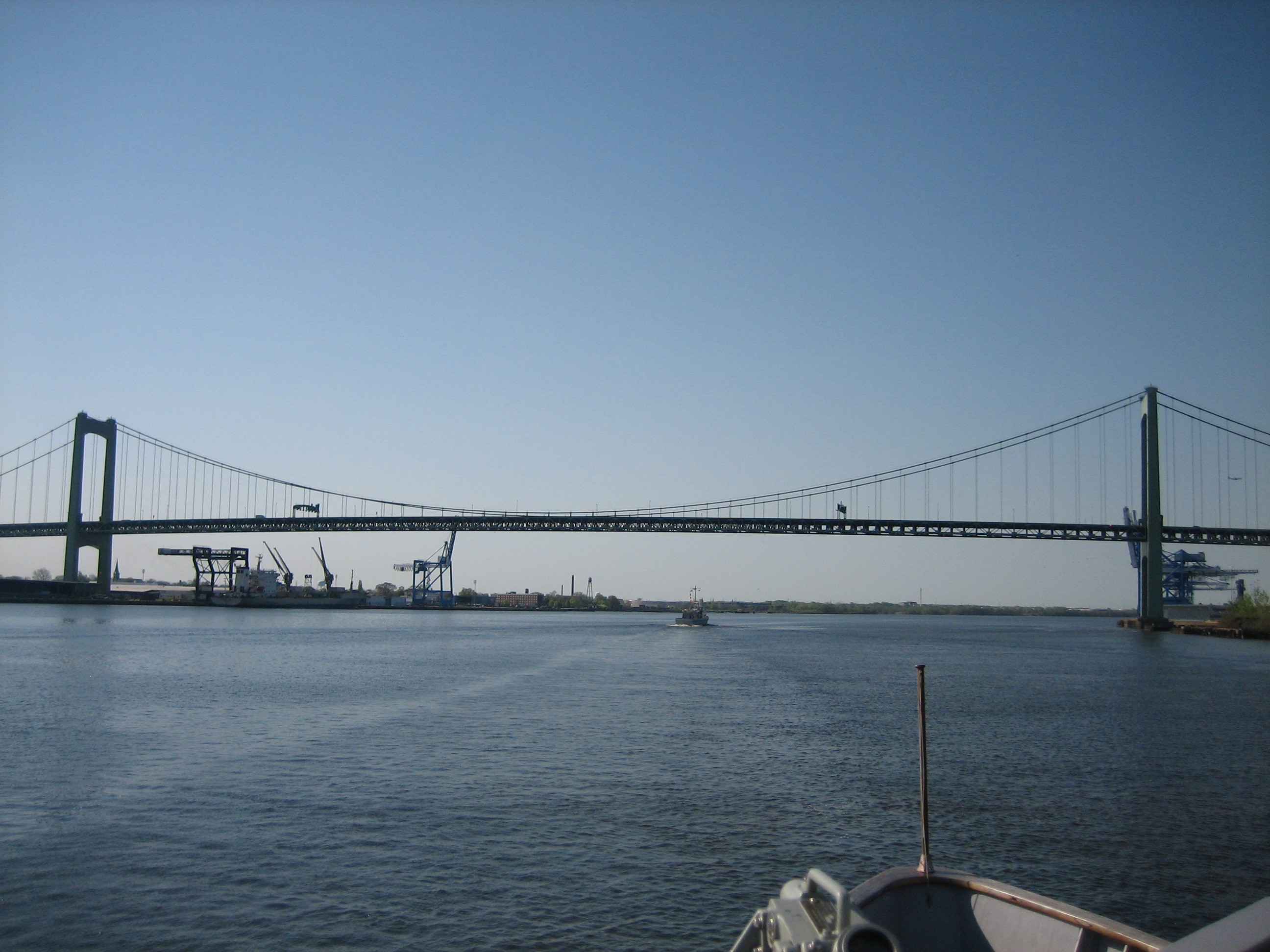
Walt Whitman Bridge and Gloucester Terminal

Delaware River Port Authority operates bridges in the port. The Walt Whitman Bridge crosses the Delaware River at the port as Interstate 76 (I-76), which interchanges with Interstate 295. The Benjamin Franklin Bridge (U.S. Route 30 is the north side of Camden.

The North-South Freeway, which carries Interstate 676 north to downtown Camden. Route 76C connector runs east to U.S. Route 130 and Route 168.

County Routes 537, 543, 551 and 561 all travel through the center of the city.

== Rail ==
Rail service to some parts of the port is within Conrail's South Jersey/Philadelphia Shared Assets Area. The port is south of Pavonia Yard and the Delair Bridge, the most downstream railroad bridge crossing the Delaware at Pennsuaken. The Vineland Secondary has a spur running along the port. Norfolk Southern Railway and CSX Transportation are accessible through Conrail switching operations.

== Tourism and recreation ==
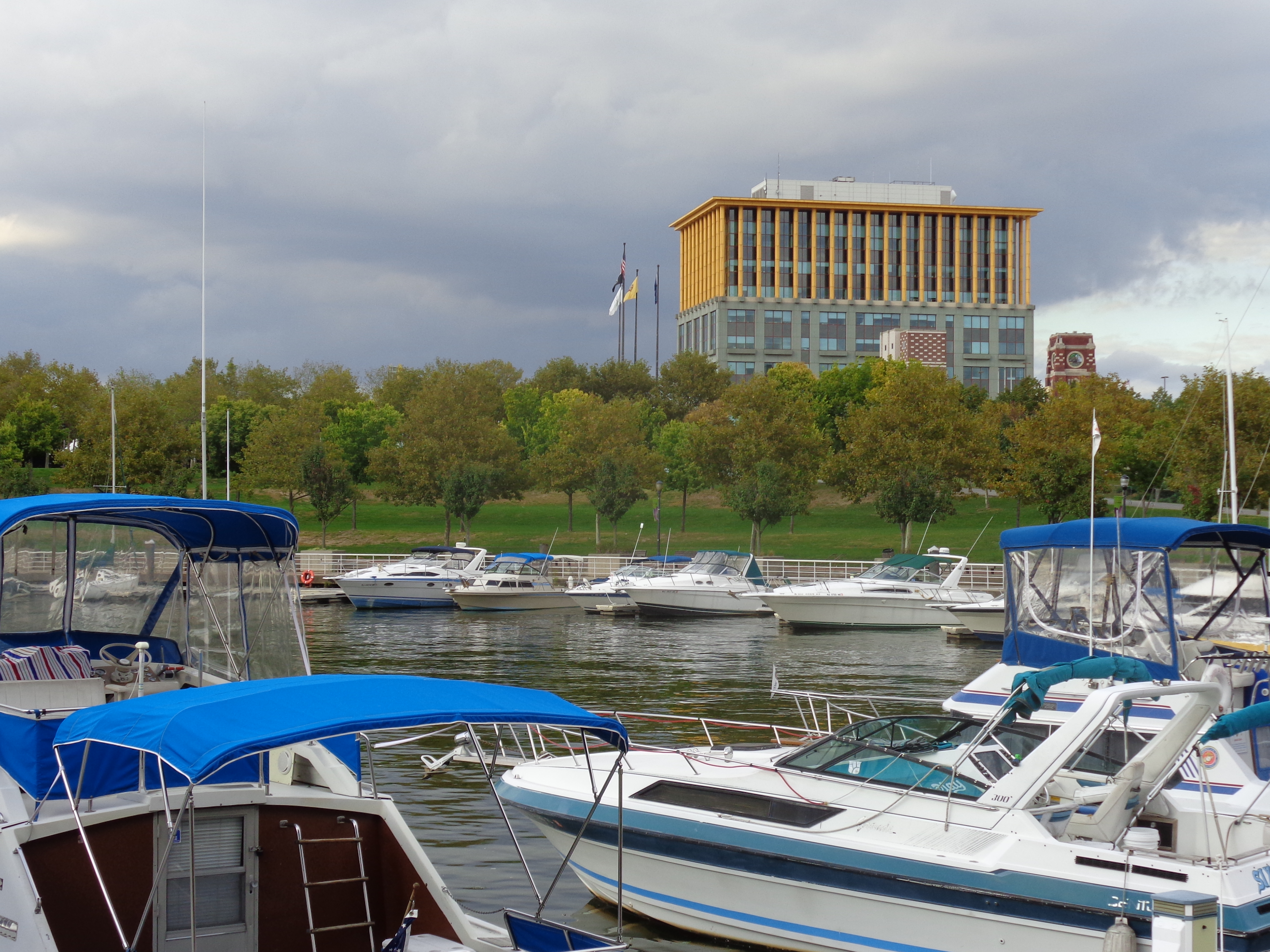
Wiggins Marina and One Port Center

The Central Waterfront, with Wiggins Marina, lies upstream of the maritime and industrial facilities in the port. The USS New Jersey (BB-62) is berthed between the two districts. The BB&T Pavilion, Wiggins Park, and the Adventure Aquarium are nearby.

Bergen Square and Waterfront South are two districts to the east of the port. There has been some conflict with combining residential needs with port needs. The Camden Shipyard & Maritime Museum opened in 2016. Phoenix Park was developed in 2015 allowing for waterfront access for recreation in the midst of the maritime facilities.

The Freedom Pier is a public waterfront promenade at the former Coast Guard Base Gloucester.

== See also ==
- Petty Island
- List of ports in the United States
  - United States container ports
- Pureland Industrial Complex is 12 miles south of the port
- Port of Wilmington (Delaware), a component of the Delaware Valley port system
- Port of Chester, a component of the Delaware Valley port system
- Ships built in Camden, New Jersey
