= Port of Paulsboro =

- Interactive map of Port of Paulsboro

Location
- Country: United States
- Location: Delaware River; Paulsboro, New Jersey, U.S.
- Coordinates: 39°51′07″N 75°14′06″W

Details
- Draft depth: 45 feet
- Air draft: 188 feet

The Port of Paulsboro is located on the Delaware River and Mantua Creek in and around Paulsboro, in Gloucester County, New Jersey, approximately 78 miles (126 km) from the Atlantic Ocean. Traditionally one of the nation's busiest for marine transfer operations, notably for crude oil and petroleum products, such as jet fuel and asphalt, it is a port of entry with several facilities within a foreign trade zone.

A part of the port is being redeveloped as an adaptable deep water omniport able to handle a variety of bulk and break bulk cargo, as well as shipping containers. The Paulsboro Marine Terminal, as it is known, is owned by the South Jersey Port Corporation and operated by Holt Logistics. The first ship to call at the port, the Doric Warrior, carrying steel for NLMK, arrived March 3, 2017, marking the opening of the new facility. The port is planned the site for the production the monopile foundations for turbines for offshore wind power in New Jersey.

== Location and access ==
The Port of Paulsboro is one of several in the Philadelphia metropolitan area and is situated on the east banks of the Delaware River in Gloucester County, New Jersey, across from Philadelphia International Airport. The 96-acre (38.8 ha) site of Fort Billingsport was the first land purchase by the United States government, made by the Continental Congress on July 5, 1776. The port was first developed to handle petroleum products in 1917 by the Vacuum Oil Company. The Port of Paulsboro has been used to refer to the marine transfer operations at Thompson Point in Greenwich Township, Gibbstown (Greenwich Township), Billingsport, Mantua Creek, Eagle Point in West Deptford Township, and Westville. It is a port of entry in United States Citizenship and Immigration Services (USCIS) District 21, which covers New Jersey.

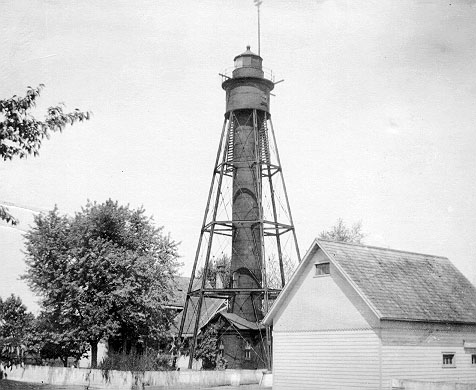
Tinicum Island Rear Range Light

=== Shipping channels and lighthouses ===
The Delaware River is tidal at Paulsboro, which is about 78 miles (126 km) from the Atlantic Ocean at the entrance to the Delaware Bay. Since 1942, the Delaware River Main Channel has been maintained at a depth of 40 feet (12 m). A 102.5-mile (165.0 km) stretch of the federal navigation shipping channel is being deepened to 45 feet (14 m) from the Port of Camden and Port of Philadelphia to the bay, with a 2017 projected completion date. Local pilotage is generally required for larger commercial vessels. Anchorage No. 9 is in the vicinity of the mouth of Mantua Creek, to which the river channel is 30 feet (9.1 m).

Tinicum Island Rear Range Light and Tinicum Front Range Light, known as the Billingsport Front Light, are a pair of range lights serving the downstream reach of the port. These front and rear range lighthouses guide sailors who, by aligning the two lights and keeping one light on top of the other, stay in the channel's center and avoid Little Tinicum Island. The rear light is listed on the state and federal registers of historic places.

=== Road and rail ===
The port is located near New Jersey Route 44 and Interstate 295. Rail service on different spurs of the Penns Grove Secondary is within the South Jersey/Philadelphia Shared Assets Area of Conrail, which operates a rail yard along the line for owners CSX Transportation and Norfolk Southern Railway. SMS Rail Lines handle transfers at parts of the port.

== Petroleum ==
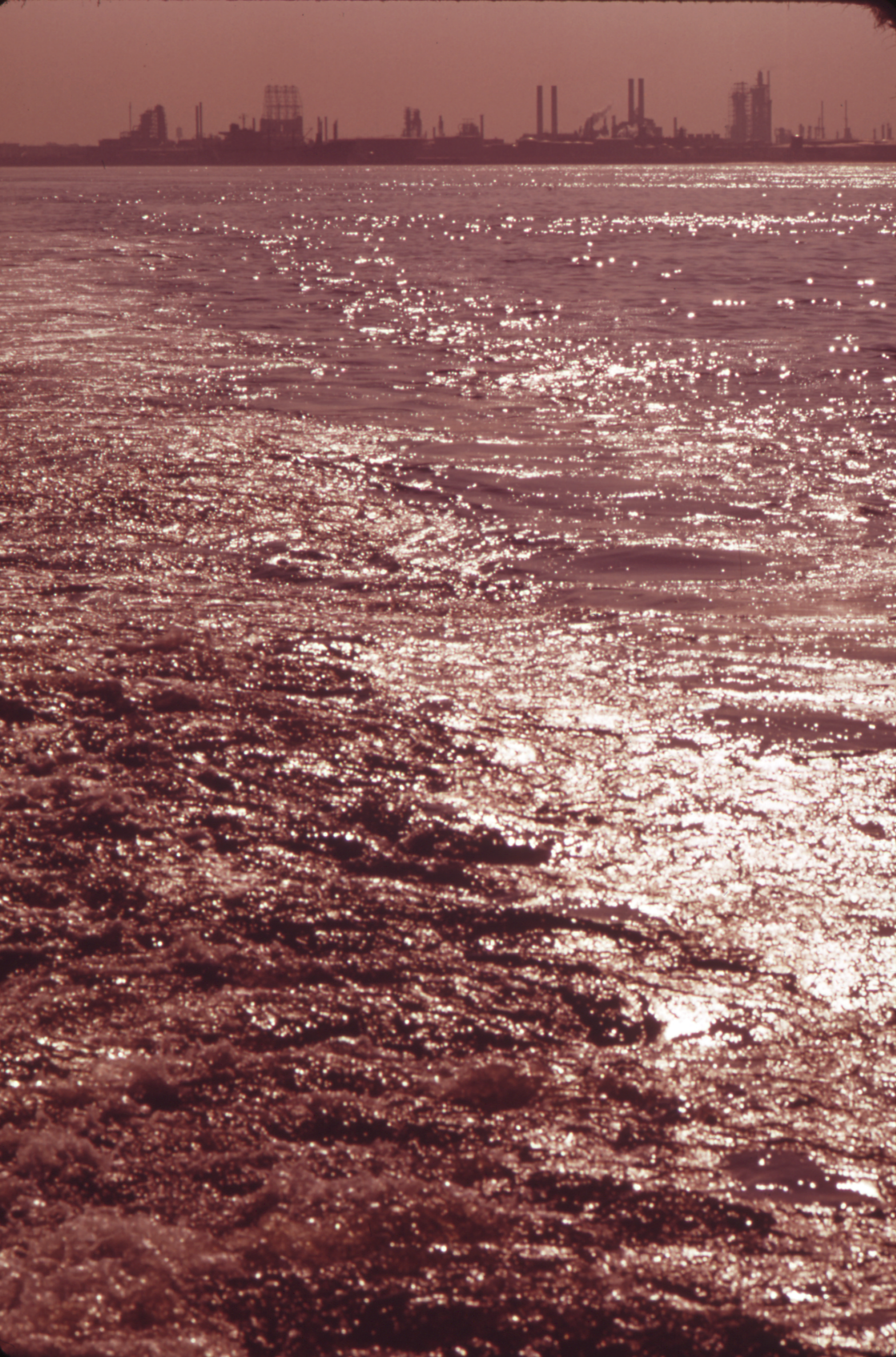
View across Delaware River to Paulsboro Refinery

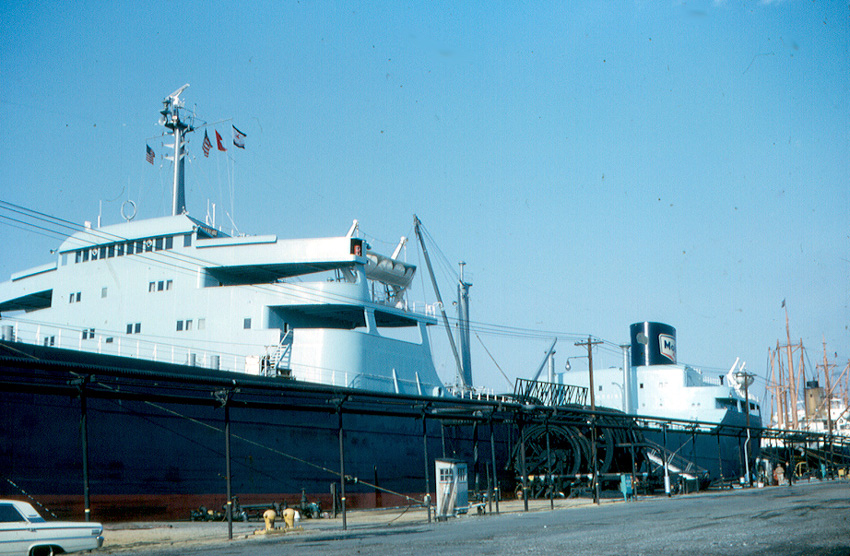
Mobil Valiant, 1965

As of 2010, crude oil accounted for more than half of all annual cargo tonnage on the Delaware River. Several refineries and oil depots in Paulsboro, Greenwich Township, and West Deptford Township have operated at the port since the first was developed in 1917. At various times, Citgo, Mobil, BP, Sun Oil, Valero, PBF Energy, and NuStar Energy have maintained facilities adjacent to the port, as has General American Transportation Corporation (GATX). In addition to maritime transfer operations, the petroleum facilities are also served by tanker trucks, rail transport, and pipelines, including one to the Philadelphia Airport across the river and one to nearby junction with the Colonial Pipeline system.

=== Facilities ===
The Paulsboro Refinery is a 950-acre (380 ha) facility abutting Paulsboro in adjacent Gibbstown (Greenwich Township) and processes medium-to-heavy sour crude oils to produce unbranded gasoline, heating oil, and jet fuel. It is one of only two facilities on the East Coast able to process petroleum coke. It became a Special Purpose Subzone 142A of Foreign Trade Zone (FTZ) No. 142 in 1995. In 1998, Valero Energy Corporation purchased the facility from Mobil and in 2010 sold it to PBF with backing from Blackstone Group and First Reserve Corporation. Construction of a new tanker berth was completed in 2010 by Weeks Marine. In 2019, PDF received special permission to receive liquified natural gas to the plant via rail.

The Eagle Point Refinery in West Deptford Township was a 1,000-acre (400 ha) oil refinery that had once been a tomato-processing factory and became a U.S. Army munitions depot during World Wars I and II. The property was acquired by Texaco and began refining operations in 1949. It was purchased by Coastal Oil in May 1985 and in 1997 became foreign trade Special Purpose Subzone 142C. In January 2004, it was bought by Sunoco, which announced its permanent closure in 2010. The plant is being disassembled by 2015 so that a new facility can be planned by Sunoco. Its adjacent tank farm, with tanker truck, rail, pipeline, and marine transfer operations, remain active.

The Paulsboro Terminal started as an oil depot during World War I. In 1929, Patterson Oil further developed the property as an oil storage and fueling terminal. Eastern Gas & Fuels took over in 1954 and completed the terminal expansion. It sold the terminal in 1960 to Sinclair Refining Corporation. In 1969, after Sinclair and Atlantic Richfield Company merged, BP bought the property. The 130-acre (53 ha) facility stopped operations in 1996 and is being redeveloped as part of the new omniport.

The Citgo Asphalt Refining Company (CARCO) asphalt refinery on the east side of Mantua Creek was purchased by NuStar Energy in 2007. It became foreign trade Special Purpose Subzone 142B in 1996. NuStar also owned a small tank farm with a truck transport terminal in Billingsport. In 2008 NuStar sold half its business to Lindsay Goldberg, which bought the company outright in February 2014, renaming it Axeon Specialty Products. The asphalt refinery, ranked as America's largest, was scheduled to close in 2017.

The Plains Terminal is a petroleum products storage and marine transfer facility in Billingsport which expanded its tank farm with eight new storage tanks in 2009. It has been owned by ExxonMobil, GATX Terminals Corporation, which was taken over by Kinder Morgan, and by Support Terminals Operating Partnership (a NuStar subsidiary). In 2012, Plains All American Pipeline and previous owners settled with NJ DEP to remediate hazardous substances in the soil at the site. It has been part of a foreign trade Special Purpose Subzone 142A since 1995.

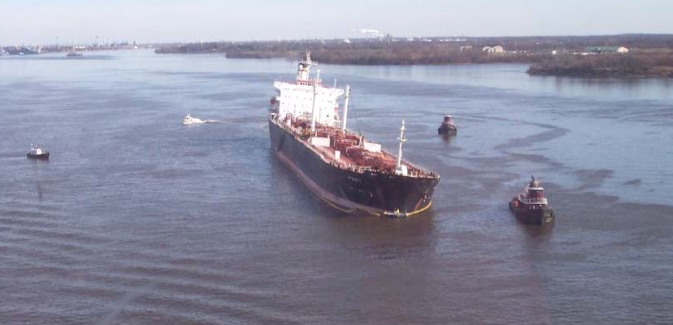
Athos 1 oil spill

In 2019, the New Jersey Attorney General announced it would sue ExxonMobil for releasing toxic waste into Mantua Creek.

=== Tanker oil spills ===
On November 26, 2004, 265,000 US gallons (1,000 m^{3}) of crude oil spilled from the Cyprus-flagged oil tanker Athos 1, which was preparing to dock at the Citgo asphalt refinery, after its hull had been punctured by a submerged, discarded anchor. Citgo was cleared of liability in 2011. The oil spill has had lasting impact on the estuary.

In October 2007, another spill took place at the port when approximately 1,200 US gallons (4.5 m^{3}) of oil leaked from the Tigani, an 809-foot (247 m) Malta-flagged tanker operated by Cardiff Marine.

== Solar array ==
When opened in 2003 by BP on a 17-acre (6.9 ha) landfill on the Dow Chemical brownfield site, the photovoltaic system, or solar array, which is adjacent to the former BP Paulsboro Terminal, was the largest facility for solar power in New Jersey and one of the largest on the East Coast. BP constructed the solar power facility, which was designed for 276 kilowatts peak demand and 350,000 kilowatt-hours per year, to showcase the potential for brownfield to brightfield redevelopment.

== Paulsboro Marine Terminal ==
The South Jersey Port Corporation (SJPC) operates three terminals at the Port of Camden and one at the Port of Salem. The agency is working with Gloucester County Improvement Authority (GCIA) to develop a deep water omniport at the confluence of the Delaware River and Mantua Creek. Estimated to cost $274 million, construction began in the fall of 2009 for the marine terminal on brownfield sites at 130 acres (53 ha) of a former BP crude oil and petrochemical storage facility and 60 acres (24 ha) of a former chemical plant of Dow Chemical.

The Paulsboro Marine Terminal will include an industrial park and is designed to integrate changing needs for industrial manufacturing, value-added processing, and distribution space, and to provide complete intermodal freight transport capabilities. The terminal will handle a diversity of bulk and break bulk cargo, as well as shipping containers. New infrastructure includes a wharf, warehouse space, sewers with storm water retention, roadway access, and rail infrastructure. It will include facility connections to the adjacent solar power facility.

Originally scheduled to be opened in 2012, it was later postponed to 2013. Infrastructure construction work is being completed in phases and installation of the terminal facilities has been delayed further by a lack of commercial clients. The SJPC has preliminary Memoranda of Understanding with a number of companies. Dole Food Company considered relocating import operations, but in August 2013 decided to remain at the Port of Wilmington (Delaware).

In July 2014, SJPC and Holt Logistics announced that the company would possibly move some of their operations to Paulsboro as part of land exchange deal in the Port of Camden. The first tenant, NMLK Steel, will occupy approximately 40 acres of the port to bring steel slabs and transload them onto rail cars for distribution throughout the country.

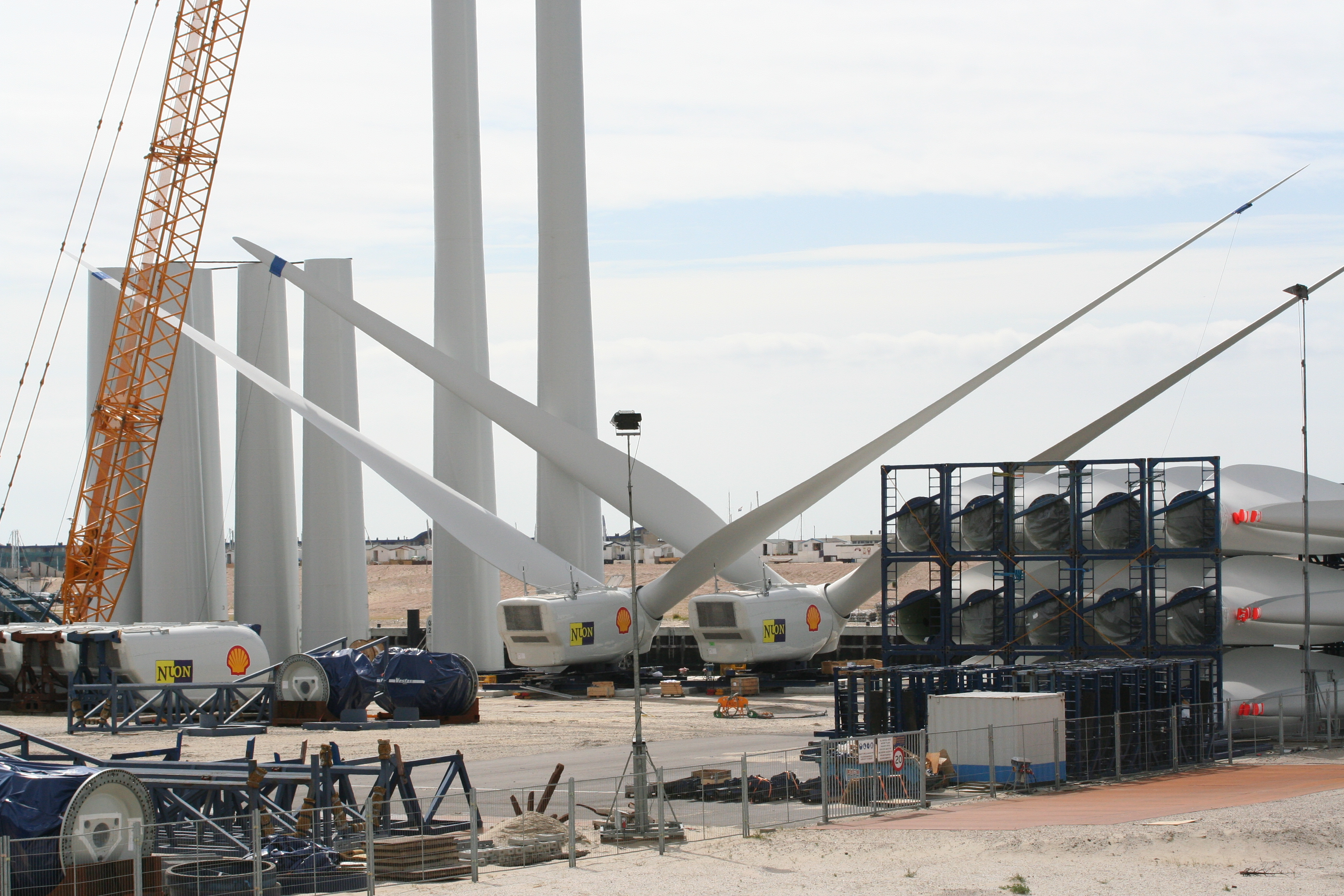
The port is slated to become a wind turbine manufacturing and staging area, such as above

=== Wind power logistics center ===
The port is a manufacturing/assembly center for wind turbines for the development of wind power in New Jersey and other offshore wind power projects along the East Coast of the United States. In August 2010, legislation to encourage the development of wind power in New Jersey was signed by New Jersey Governor Chris Christie at the Port of Paulsboro. The Offshore Wind Economic Development Act authorized New Jersey Economic Development Authority to provide up to $100 million in tax credits for wind energy facilities. Studies completed in 2012 concluded that the port is well suited to become a center for the manufacture, assembly, and transport of wind turbines to be used to further the development of Atlantic Wind Connection. The port is the site for the production the enormous monopile foundations for turbines for the off-shore wind farm Ocean Wind.

=== Dredging ===
Site surveys for the Army Corps of Engineers (USACE) permit to build the project were performed by CH2M Hill. In 2011, USACE authorized additional dredging of a 27-acre (11 ha) area at the confluence to 40 feet (12 m) in the river and 20 feet (6.1 m) in the creek to provide deep water berths and obtain dredge fill for the omniport. The terminal site has been raised by up to 10 feet (3 m) with 300,000 cubic yards (230,000 m^{3}) of dredge fill from the river and creek in order to be above the 100-year floodplain and potential for sea-level rise due to climate change caused by global warming.

=== Docks ===
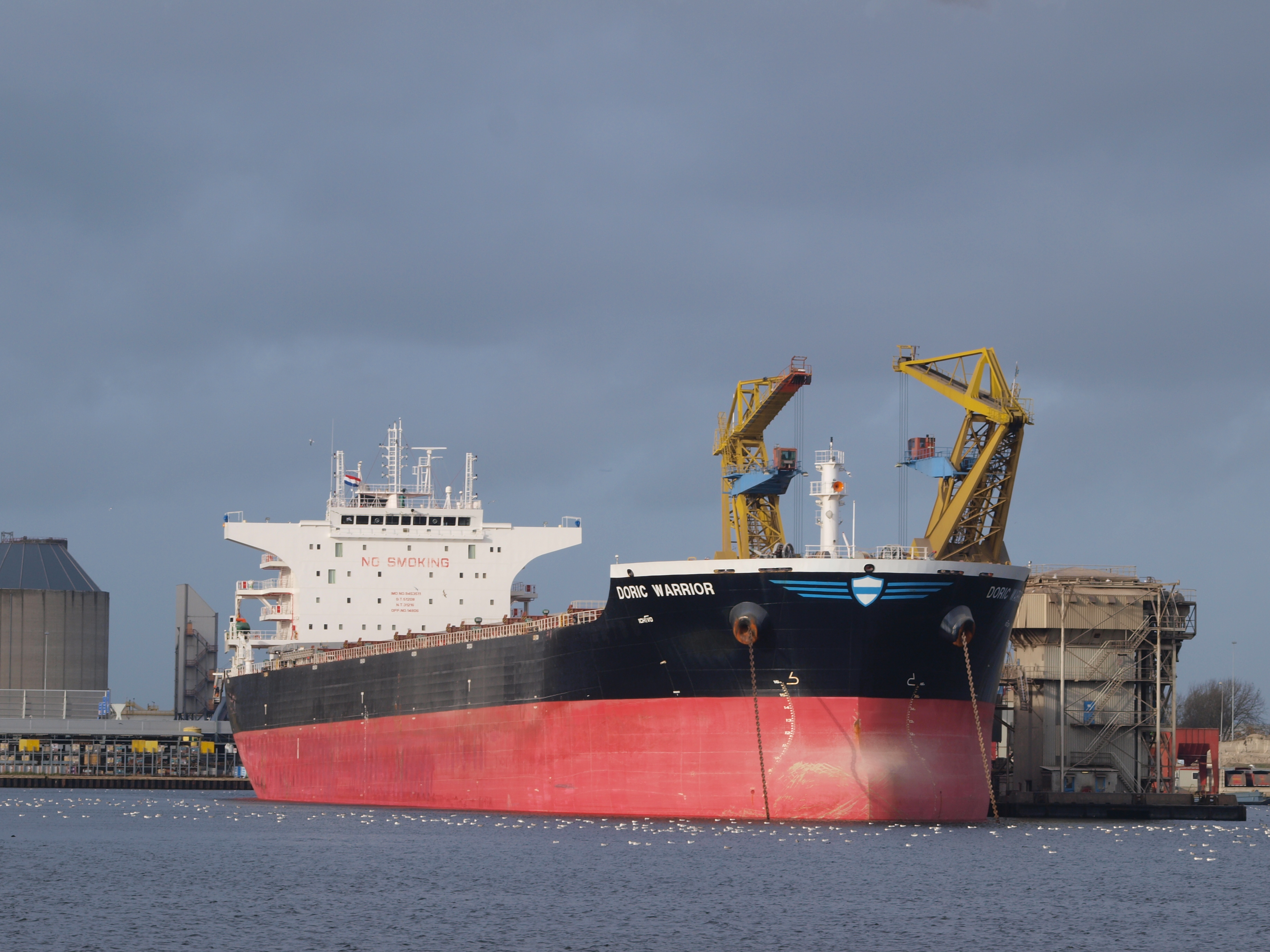
Doric Warrior (as seen in the Netherlands) was the first ship to arrive at new marine terminal

Planned dock capacity would allow for a 550 feet (170 m) long barge mooring and 2,400 feet (730 m) of deep water berths of 40 feet (12 m) at Mean Low Water (MLW) that would also accommodate three Handymax size vessels. Construction of bulkheads is designed to protect submerged aquatic vegetation. The final wharf construction, which had been previously bid by three companies in 2012, may be delayed until 2016, pending signed lease agreements by South Jersey Port Corporation with companies that will use the port. Shippers and industrial companies can require a different range of wharf specifications, depending on the finished goods, materials, and commodities they handle.

=== Access road to I-295 ===
Traditionally, access to various port facilities west of Mantua Creek has been via New Jersey Route 44 over a historic vertical lift bridge at mile point 1.7 built in 1935 and locally known as the Gateway to Paulsboro. Owned and operated by the New Jersey Department of Transportation (NJDOT), it was last significantly renovated in 1986–1988.

A portion of the road that would later be designated Interstate 295 was opened in 1948. The Gloucester County Improvement Authority is building a new connector, which is funded by the New Jersey Department of Transportation and is expected to be completed by 2014, that would create a gateway from I-295 to the new marine terminal. It includes a new access road and 0.75-mile (1.2 km) overpass bridge over the creek from Paradise Road in West Deptford Township between the Gloucester County sewage treatment plant and the NuStar Energy asphalt refinery. Paradise Road, which changes to Mantua Creek Road, provides direct access to Exit 19 of I-295. This new routing through West Deptford would avoid heavy truck traffic through residential areas of Paulsboro.

=== Rail infrastructure ===
The port is located within Conrail's South Jersey/Philadelphia Shared Assets Area. SMS Rail Lines handles interchanges with the Penns Grove Secondary line. New infrastructure at the omniport includes the construction of a rail crossing, turnouts, and 11,000 feet (3,400 m) of track with a balloon loop for dockside accessibility. It is expected to cost $3.2 million and be completed by 2014. Partial federal funding for this work was obtained in 2011 by SJPC, Conrail, and Salem County by leveraging $117.65 million of infrastructure funding for the marine terminal and other South Jersey projects. They include upgrading the southern section of the Salem Branch rail freight line from Swedesboro to the Port of Salem and retrofitting of the Delair Bridge, the most downstream rail crossing of the Delaware and the regional connection to the national rail network, to accommodate industry standard, 286,000-pound (130,000 kg) capacity rail cars.

==== Jefferson Street Bridge ====
The Jefferson Street Bridge is a railroad movable bridge over Mantua Creek 1.3 miles (2.1 km) upstream from its mouth. The 160-foot (49 m) "A-Frame", shear pole, swing bridge was originally constructed in 1917 and rebuilt in 1940. Once part of Pennsylvania-Reading Seashore Lines (PRSL), it is now part of Conrail's Penns Grove Secondary. Originally manually opened, it was partially automated sometime between 2000 and 2003.

Buckling of the bridge caused a derailment of a coal train in 2009. More than 15 rail cars left the tracks, though none toppled.

On November 30, 2012 seven cars derailed while crossing the bridge. Of the four cars that fell into the creek, one was punctured, releasing 23,000 US gallons (87 m^{3}) of highly toxic vinyl chloride, which required an evacuation in the region and Paulsboro school lock-downs. Removal of derailed cars and environmental cleanup was handled by U.S. Coast Guard.

In March 2013, Conrail announced that the bridge would be replaced with an expected September 2014 operational date. Normally, between March 1 and November 30 the bridge is left in the open position for maritime traffic and closed when trains approach. The new bridge opened in March 2015.

Numerous lawsuits have been brought in the matter.

== See also ==
- List of ports in the United States
- Port of Camden
- Port of Salem
- Bayway Refinery
- Chemical Coast
- Delaware City Refinery
- Refineries in New Jersey
