= FastShip, Inc. =

Defunct American shipping company

- Type: Private
- Industry: Ship transportation
- Founded: Philadelphia, Pennsylvania (October 2, 1997)
- Founder: David L. Giles
- Fate: September 25, 2012 (discharge from bankruptcy)
- Subsidiaries: FastShip Atlantic, Inc.
- Website: fastshipatlantic.com

FastShip, Inc. was a company that proposed a new seaborne intermodal cargo service in the 1990s and filed for bankruptcy reorganization in 2012.

FastShip's predecessor company, Thornycroft, Giles & Co. was awarded several patents for designs of fast, monohull ships in the early 1990s. FastShip Atlantic, Inc. was incorporated in 1992 to commercialize Thornycroft, Giles' design.

FastShip, Inc. was incorporated in Delaware in October 1997, and in the same month, founder David L. Giles described an improved logistics process in Scientific American.

FastShip Atlantic, Inc. specifically proposed to cross the Atlantic Ocean in less than 95 hours, compared with 160 hours on conventional container ships, and to load and unload intermodal containers in less than six hours on each end, compared to conventional times of 48 hours. In all, the company proposed to cut terminal-to-terminal times from 256 hours to 107 hours. The transit time would be seven days between major industrial centers of Western Europe and the East and Midwest of the United States.

FastShip Atlantic proposed using the Port of Philadelphia as its western terminus and Cherbourg, France, as its eastern terminus.

A FastShip TG770 could carry 1432 TEUs (twenty-foot equivalent containers), loaded on two levels. The ship's hull in principle is a semi-displacement V steel, having a length of 265 meters, a width of 40 meters and a draft of 10.50 meters. The propulsion system comprised 5 jet turbines, each operating a water jet.

FastShip, Inc., FastShip Atlantic, Inc., and Thornycroft, Giles & Co. filed for bankruptcy together in Delaware in March, 2012, and was discharged in September 2012.
