= Camden Shipyard & Maritime Museum =

Museum in Camden, New Jersey, US

Coordinates: 39.920548°N 75.119328°W

The Camden Shipyard & Maritime Museum was a maritime museum in the Waterfront South neighborhood of Camden, New Jersey, across the Delaware River from Philadelphia. The building now hosts the Henson Heritage & Training Center, which is a non-profit organization that continues the mission of CSMM by equipping young adults with accessible workforce development training in trade and life skills, helping them navigate a path toward meaningful work, while preserving a historic landmark.

The museum opened in September 2016. Its main building is the former Church of our Savior, and its grounds include land once owned by the New York Shipbuilding Co., which is said to have been, at one time, the largest shipbuilder in the world. The museum partners with UrbanPromise on their Urban BoatWorks program, which teaches middle-school and high-school students wooden boat-building.
