= Mannington Mills =

American corporation

- Company type: Privately held company
- Industry: Flooring manufacturing
- Founded: 1915; 110 years ago in Salem, New Jersey
- Founder: John Boston Campbell, Neil Campbell, and Kenneth Campbell
- Headquarters: Salem, New Jersey, United States
- Area served: International
- Key people: Keith S. Campbell (Chairman)
- Products: Vinyl composition tile, laminate, hardwood, porcelain tile floors, commercial carpet, and rubber flooring
- Website: www.mannington.com

Mannington Mills is a fifth generation family owned international flooring manufacturer with corporate headquarters in Salem, New Jersey. The company was founded in Salem by John Boston Campbell and his sons Neil and Kenneth in 1915.

In 2020, Mannington acquired Phenix Flooring, a residential carpet manufacturer based out of Dalton, GA.

In 2008, Mannington acquired Burke Industries, which produces rubber flooring tiles, wall base, treads, and accessories. In addition to facilities at the Port of Salem and the Pureland Industrial Complex in New Jersey, the company has three additional plant locations: in Epes, Alabama; Calhoun, Georgia; and High Point, North Carolina. Burke Industries facilities are in Eustis, Florida and San Jose, California. In 2012, Mannington acquired United Kingdom-based Amtico International.

A privately held company, Mannington is one of the largest and oldest flooring manufacturers in the United States and is the world's largest manufacturer of luxury vinyl tile. It also produces residential and commercial resilient, laminate, hardwood and porcelain tile floors, as well as commercial carpet and rubber. Chairman of Mannington Mills, Keith S. Campbell, serves on the board of directors of the Federal Reserve Bank of Philadelphia.

In 2009, the company initiated an environmental clean-up of its facilities adjacent to Salem in Mannington Township.

In 2010, in conjunction with 3M Canada Mannington Mills remanufactured 200,000 square feet of large format graphics that had been used in the Vancouver 2010 Winter Olympics into high recycled content flooring.
