= Port of Salem =

Port in New Jersey, USA

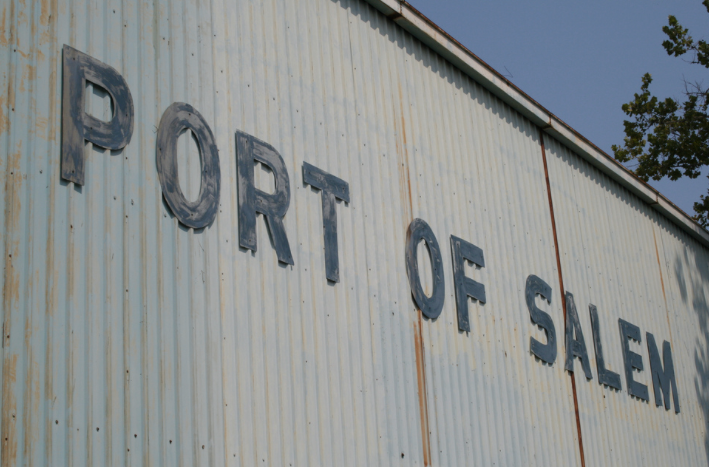
- Port of Salem building sign
- Interactive map of Port of Salem
- Location within the United States

Location
- Country: USA
- Location: Salem, New Jersey
- Coordinates: 39°34′26″N 75°29′02″W

Details
- Operated by: South Jersey Port Corporation
- Draft depth: 16 feet
- Air draft: Overhead power line

The Port of Salem is a shallow-draft (16 feet) port in the vicinity of the Salem River Cut-Off on the Salem River in Salem, New Jersey in the United States about 2 miles (3.2 km) east of the Delaware River and about 54 miles (87 km) from the Atlantic Ocean. It was re-designated a port of entry in 1984 and became a foreign trade zone (FTZ) in 1987. Transloading operations include the handling of a variety of bulk cargo, notably of construction aggregate, break bulk cargo, and containers for clothing, fishing apparel, agricultural produce, and other consumer goods, and has at times involved lighterage. It is operated under the auspices of the South Jersey Port Corporation. The port is envisioned as being a component of the supply chain for the development of windpower in the Atlantic Ocean off the coast of New Jersey.

== Salem waterfront ==
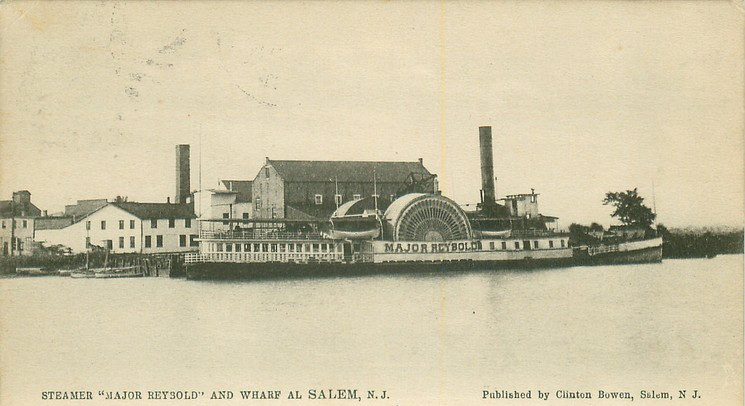
The paddle steamer Major Reybold at what was once called Majors Wharf, plied the Delaware between Salem and Philadelphia in the 19th century on the Salem Line.

The Delaware River estuary was the territory of the Lenape. European settlement of the region around today's Salem began in 1638 when the colony of New Sweden was established and the Salem River was called Varkens Kill or Hogg Creek. Tradition holds that ethnic Finns settled inland from Finns Point in 1638. In 1641, a group from the New Haven Colony settled around Varkens Kill. In 1655, it was re-claimed by New Netherland and in 1664 it became part of the Province of New Jersey. In 1675, a land patent was given to John Fenwick, who founded the town. Originally, Salem's wharves were located along Fenwick Creek and Salem Creek, and received calls from Philadelphia, Boston and the Caribbean. During the American Revolutionary War, it was occupied by the British to prevent supplies from reaching American troops. Steamer service between Salem and Philadelphia began in 1825. The Salem Railroad opened in 1863.

The Salem River Cut-off, which bypasses a large bend in the river at the port, was authorized in 1925. For much of the 20th century, the waterfront along the Salem River Cut-off and Fenwick Creek was dominated by industries centered around glass manufacturing, food processing, and mineral/oil storage. From 1905 to 1978, H. J. Heinz Company operated a large processing plant along Fenwick Creek. Mannington Mills, Anchor Glass, and AluChem are located proximate to the port, as well as the South Jersey Farmers Exchange in nearby Woodstown.

== Port of entry and foreign trade zone ==
Salem was originally designated a port of entry in 1682 by royal commission of the British Crown.

The City of Salem established a municipal port authority in 1982. In 1984, the port resumed international shipping operations and the United States Customs Service granted it status as a water port of entry, the first such designation made since the 1930s. It is now a port of entry in United States Citizenship and Immigration Services (USCIS) District 21, which is headquartered in Newark and covers New Jersey.

Along with Millville Municipal Airport, portions of the port have been part of foreign trade zone #142 since 1987. Subzones associated with FTZ142 are located at the Port of Paulsboro and other locations in South Jersey.

== Shipping channels and lighthouses ==
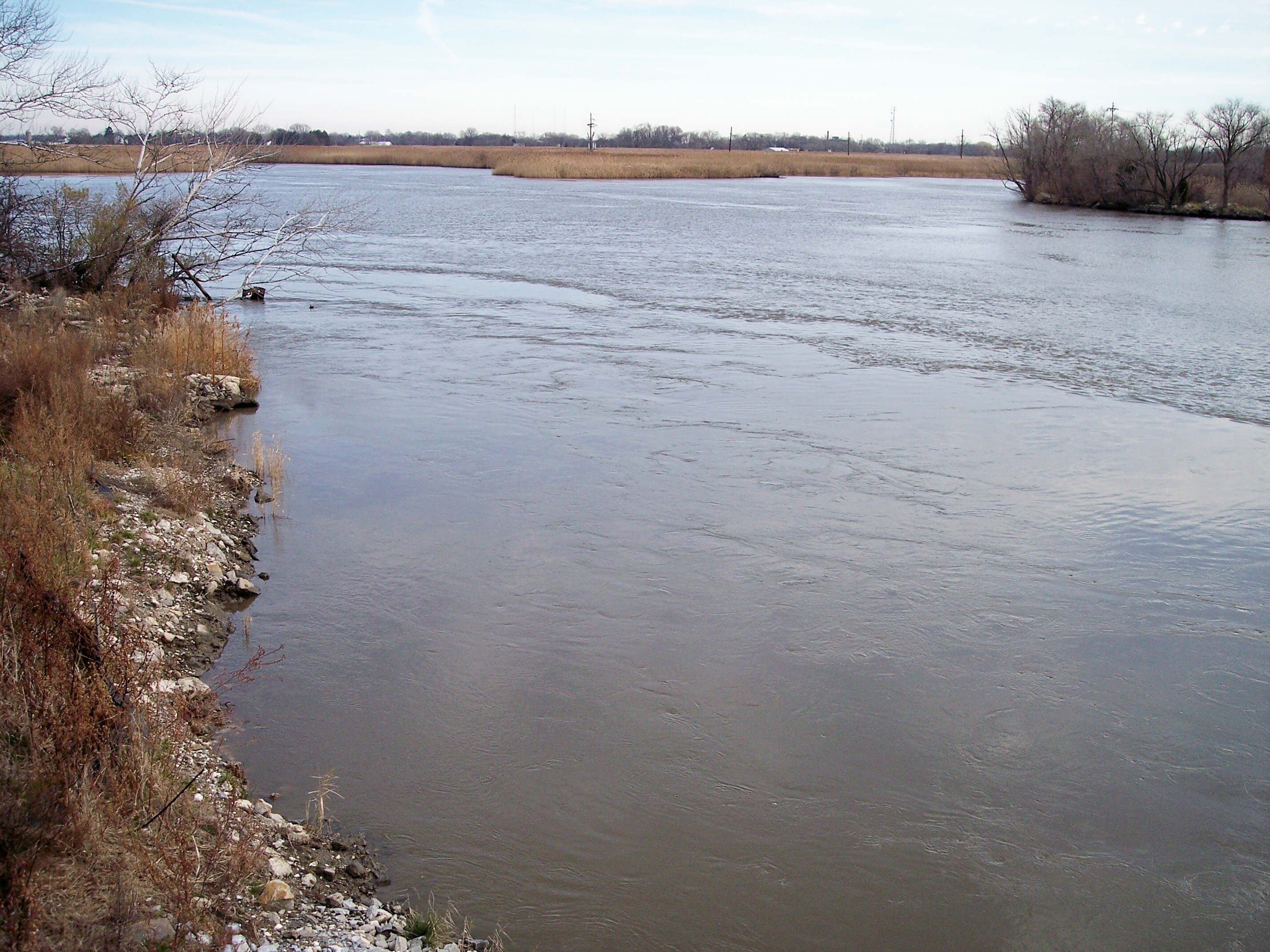
The Salem above the head of navigation

The Delaware and Salem rivers are tidal. The Delaware River Main Channel has been maintained at a depth of 40 feet (12 m). Dredging to a depth of 45 feet (14 m) was completed in 2017. Reach C, which includes the entrance to the Salem Port, was completed in 2010. The shipping channel of the Salem River is much shallower, making the city a shallow draft port, which prohibits use by Handymax class ships. The Salem River and Cut-Off were first channelized in 1925 to a depth of 16 feet (4.9 m). The river is entered though Salem Cove about 50 miles (80 km) from the Atlantic Ocean at the entrance of the Delaware Bay. The channel travels along the southeast side of the cove for 2 miles (3.2 km) and continues another 0.8 miles (1.3 km) to the Cut-Off and 1.8 miles (2.9 km) to the head of navigation at the first bridge crossing (Route 49).

The Delaware River is served by various range lights. Reedy Island is approximately 5 miles (8 km) southwest of the mouth of the Salem River. Reedy Island Front Light works in conjunction with the Reedy Island Range Rear Light for navigation of the Salem reach of the river. The Finns Point Range Light upstream of the Salem River was deactivated in 1950. From the Delaware River, entrance to the port is guided by the Salem River Range Lights, the Salem River Directional Light (39°34′14″N 75°30′40″W), and 11 other lighted navigational aids.

== Rail and road ==
The city and county of Salem have a long history of glass manufacturing, along with the site of the first successful glass production facility in North America. Adjacent to the port is the oldest manufacturing facility for glass containers in the United States, established in 1863 and long known as Anchor Glass, once owned by Anchor Hocking and now part of the Ardagh Group.

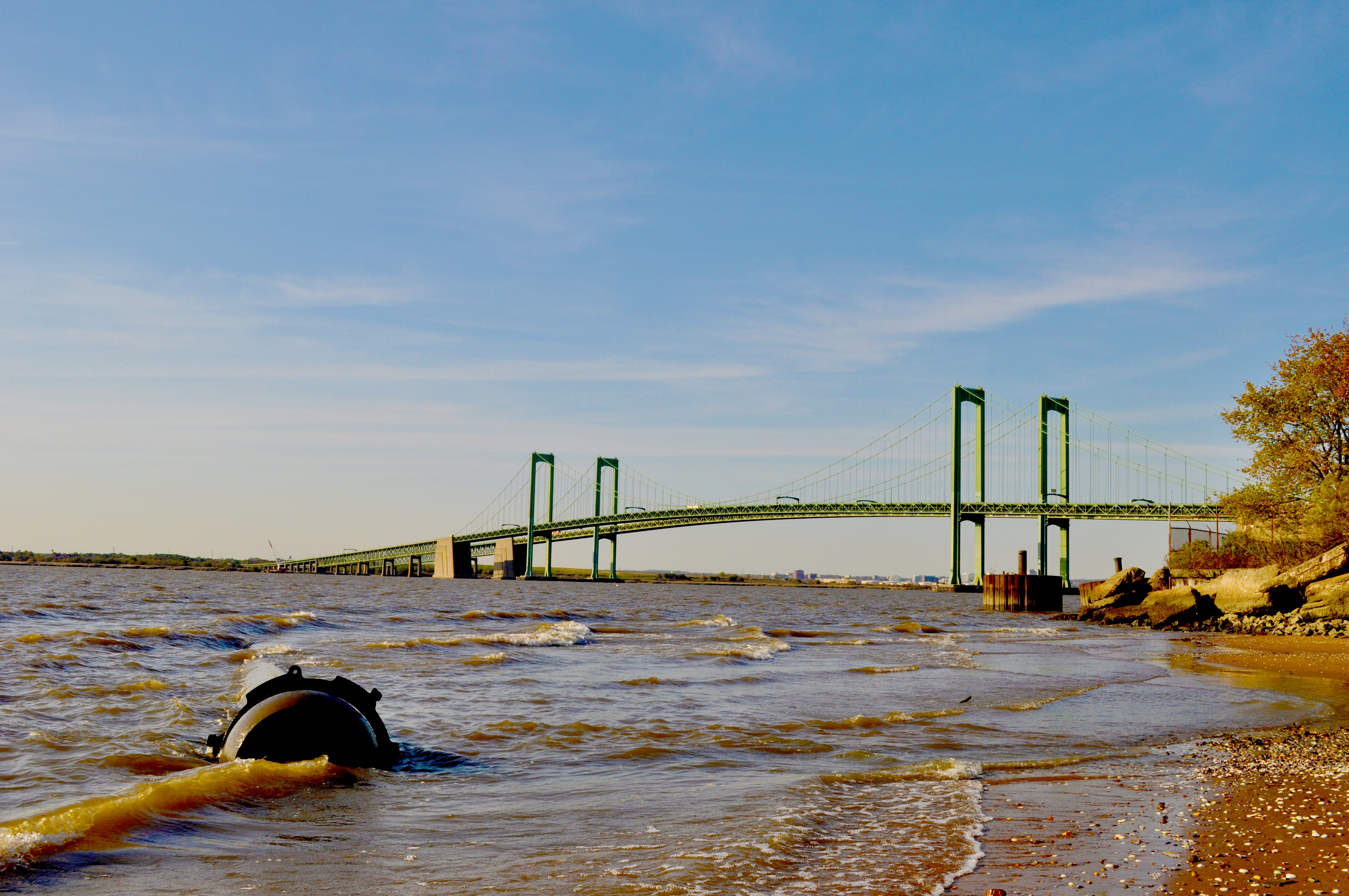
The Delaware Memorial Bridge and the Interstate Highway System are upstream from the port

The rail line serving the port is called the Glass House Running Track and is an extension of the Salem Branch. On the verge of abandonment by Conrail, the southern section of the route from Swedesboro to Salem was purchased by the county in 1983 and is leased to Southern Railroad of New Jersey (SRNJ). Long neglected, it is in poor condition and travel speeds are very slow. The line is undergoing upgrades to the rail bed, trackage, a trestle at Oldman's Creek, and other work. At Swedesboro, SRNJ interchanges with Conrail Shared Assets Operations to reach Pavonia Yard, the regional rail center.

Route 45 and Route 49 provide access to Interstate 295, the New Jersey Turnpike and the nearby Delaware Memorial Bridge. In 2005, the Route 49 bascule bridge built in 1927 over the Salem River was replaced with a fixed bridge that can be converted to a vertical lift bridge and has been dedicated the Veteran’s of Salem County Memorial Bridge.

== Commercial shipping ==
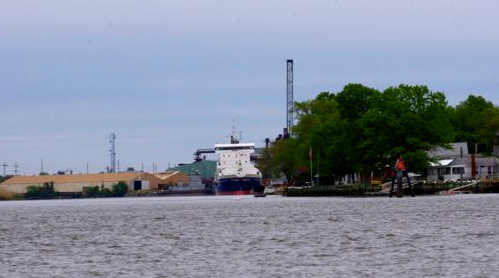
Container ship at Salem

The Salem Municipal Port Authority was established in 1982 with the intention to revitalize and coordinate shipping in the port district. In 2005, the 230-acre (93 ha) Salem City Industrial District Brownfield Development Area was created to spur re-use of brownfields, including numerous properties within and adjacent to the port district, which is located along the southern banks of the river between the Salem River Cut-Off and the Route 49 bridge just outside the downtown area. It encompasses several terminal and wharf facilities for barges and container ships for bulk and break bulk cargo, and shipping containers.

In 2006, the municipal port authority described the typical container ship making use of the port as carrying 150 containers and taking approximately 12 hours to unload and reload. The Bermuda Islander, a Dutch-flagged container ship, calls regularly at Salem.

In 2022 the port received funding for lengthening of its wharf and other improvements.

=== Salem Terminal ===
The South Jersey Port Corporation operates three terminals at the Port of Camden and is expanding operations to the Port of Paulsboro. The agency owns and operates the Salem Terminal, which had been publicly operated as the Salem Municipal Wharf and privately operated by Salem Terminals Ltd. and Del Stevedoring. It includes berth-side truck access to 350 feet (110 m) of berthing space with 65 feet (20 m) of beam (breadth). There is 8,000 square feet (740 m^{2}) of covered shed and warehouse storage space. The terminal handles barges and container ships for construction aggregate, clothing, fishing apparel, motor vehicles, agricultural produce, seafood, and consumer goods.

=== Mid-Atlantic Shipping and Stevedoring ===
Mid-Atlantic Shipping and Stevedoring relocated from Maine to Salem in the 1980s to be closer to the source of products they export and utilize the newly established port facilities. In 1990, they opened the Mid-Atlantic Shipping and Stevedoring Wharf, a small wharf terminal that is also utilized by several other shipping companies and located approximately 1.6 miles (2.6 km) above the entrance of the Salem River at 128 Tilbury Road on the east side of Barber's Basin marina, to handle bulk and break bulk cargo, and shipping containers. It has 350 feet (110 m) of berthing space with 16-foot (4.9 m) water depth. It includes 7 acres (2.8 ha) of open storage space and utility connections for refrigerated containers. While the wharf is currently owned by Bermuda International Terminals, it is operated by Mid-Atlantic.

Mid-Atlantic also operates the Tilbury Road Associates owned wharf with 540 feet (160 m) of berthing space, utility connections for refrigerated containers, and 13 acres (5.3 ha) of open storage space on the west side of Barber's Basin.

=== Port Inland Distribution Network ===
The Port Inland Distribution Network involves new or expanded transportation systems for redistribution by barge and rail for the shipped goods and containers that are delivered at area ports in an effort to curtail the use of trucks and their burden on the environment, traffic, and highway systems. The Port Authority of New York and New Jersey (PANYNJ), New Jersey Department of Transportation (NJDOT), and Delaware Valley Regional Planning Commission (DVRPC), are involved in initiatives to review and develop this network.

While it was determined that Salem was not an ideal location within the program for handling container shipping for intermodal freight transport, a private sector service provider began in 2010 the short sea shipping of aggregate products with a barge service between Salem and Tremley Point, Linden on the Arthur Kill in the Port of New York and New Jersey. It addresses a critical missing link in multimodal freight transport between ports in the Philadelphia metropolitan area and the Northern New Jersey's urban Gateway Region.

America's Marine Highway is a similar US Department of Transportation initiative to capitalize on US waterways for the transport of goods for which NJDOT applied and received approval for review and potential development of their initiative into a federally supported project. Salem would be considered for increased transportation by shipping vessels to customers along the East Coast.

== Ferry and boating ==
Barber's Basin is a marina between the two wharfs operated by Mid-Atlantic Shipping and Stevedoring. It is home to the United States Coast Guard Small Salem Station, a seasonal unit in operation from late May to mid-October. In 2013, the Coast Guard reduced staffing from daily to weekend operations. The private docks of the Salem Boating Club, across the river in Pennsville, also serve pleasure craft.

Delaware River and Bay Authority's Three Forts Ferry Crossing was renamed the Delaware City–Salem Ferry in 2013 to reflect changes in service due to Hurricane Sandy damages. The seasonal service, rather than traveling to Fort Mott, departs from Barber's Basin with service across the river to Delaware City, which has the nearby Fort DuPont State Park, with connecting service to Fort Delaware on Pea Patch Island effective May 4, 2013 for the summer seasonal service. The ferry returned to serving Fort Mott on its previous route (instead of Salem) in 2015 and is now called the Forts Ferry Crossing.

Salem has been an occasional port of call for promotional and educational functions for the A. J. Meerwald, the New Jersey State Tall Ship.

== See also ==
- Feeder ship
- List of ports in the United States
  - Port of New York and New Jersey
    - Port Newark
    - Port Jersey
    - Howland Hook
  - Port of Paulsboro
  - Port of Philadelphia
  - Port of Wilmington (Delaware)
- New Jersey Coastal Heritage Trail Route
