= Foreign-trade zones of the United States =

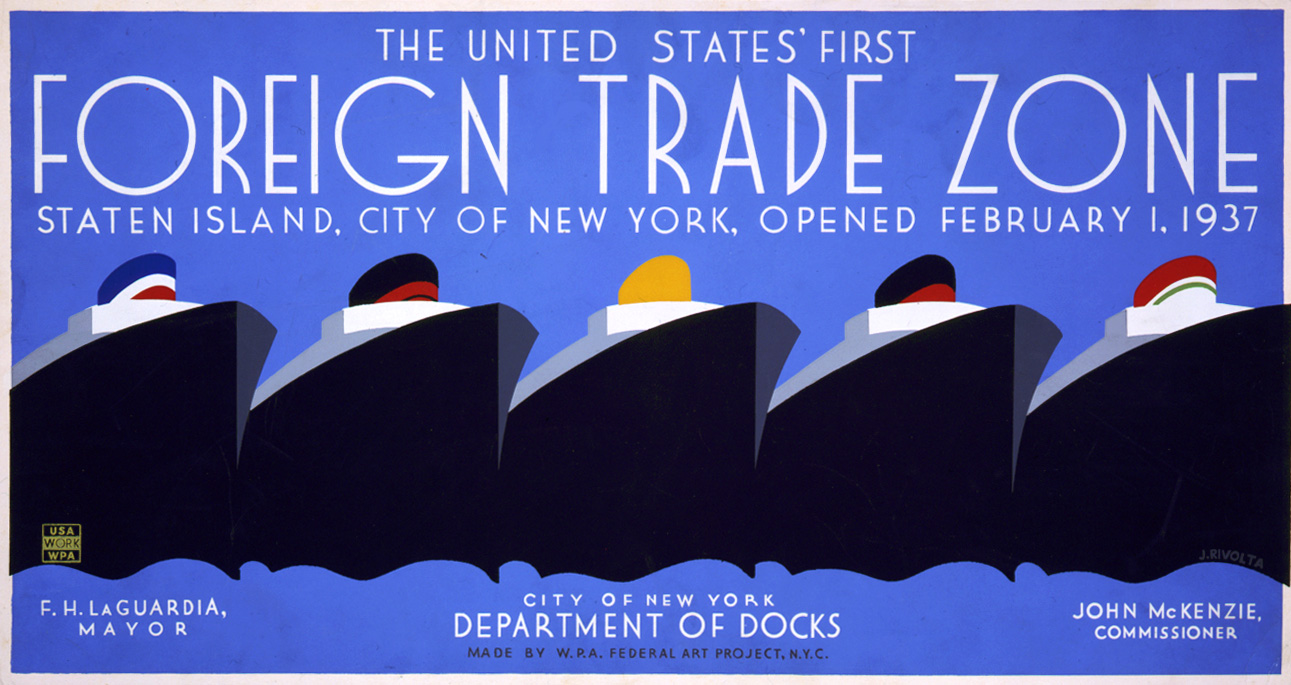
1937 poster celebrating the United States' first foreign trade zone, Staten Island

In the United States, a foreign-trade zone (FTZ) is a designated area located in or near a U.S. port of entry where domestic and foreign merchandise is considered outside U.S. customs territory for tariff purposes. In these zones, goods may be imported, stored, manipulated, manufactured, or re-exported without being subject to customs duties or other ad valorem taxes until they enter U.S. commerce. The purpose of FTZs is to promote U.S. competitiveness in international trade by reducing tariff costs on imported inputs and exported finished products.

These zones are established under federal law with authorization from the relevant state legislature and operate under the supervision of U.S. Customs and Border Protection, part of the United States Department of Homeland Security. Since 1986, customs oversight has been conducted primarily through audit-based compliance reviews and spot checks, rather than continuous on-site monitoring.

As of 2025, there are more than 260 FTZ projects and nearly 400 subzones operating across the United States.

== History ==
The U.S. foreign-trade zones program was created by the Foreign-Trade Zones Act of 1934. The Foreign-Trade Zones Act was one of two key pieces of legislation passed in 1934 in an attempt to mitigate some of the destructive effects of the Smoot-Hawley Tariffs, which had been imposed in 1930. The Foreign-Trade Zones Act was created to "expedite and encourage foreign commerce" in the United States.

Through World War II, manufacturing activity was allowed only on a very limited basis. In 1950, the original act was amended to open up FTZs to manufacturing, but it had little impact until 1980. In that year, Congress again amended the act so that products manufactured in the zones would not be assessed on U.S. value-added. This ensured that the only tariffs a producer inside the zone selling to U.S. customers would pay, would be on the raw materials imported into the zone. This "integrated" model, which replaced the previous "island" model, spurred growth in the U.S. foreign-trade zones program.

== Benefits ==
U.S. FTZs pose multiple benefits, other than duty deferred and inverted tariff, which companies can use to benefit their bottom line. However, a majority of companies are not utilizing FTZs to their full potential because sometimes the unknown creates uncertainty.

Some of the benefits of operating a FTZ include:

- Improved inventory management
- Automated recordkeeping and document storage
- Increased visibility of the supply chain
- Improved cash flow
- Improved company compliance
- Lessened U.S. regulatory agency requirements for re-export

== Inverted tariff ==
Inverted tariff benefits exist when the duty rate for the overall finished good is lower than the duty rate of the component parts. Therefore, by manufacturing finished goods within an FTZ, US importers can take advantage of the inverted tariff duty rate, all while keeping manufacturing operations within the US. Inverted tariff works when an importer with manufacturing authority within an FTZ is allowed to admit their components into the zone duty-free, manufacture the finished good, and pay CBP duties on the foreign content in the finished good at the lower duty rate of the finished goods at the time of entry. The importer avoids paying the higher duty rate on the component parts and defers the lower duty payment on the value of the foreign content until the time of consumption in the commerce of the US. Inverted tariff is seen predominantly in the manufacturing industry, benefiting automotive, petroleum, pharmaceutical, aerospace, electronics, textile companies and many more.

== Business in FTZs ==
Any company in any industry can apply to be a part of an FTZ. Companies importing to the U.S. on a regular basis and in high volume are the main participants. It is a way to reduce importing costs and save money by participating in special customs procedures and simplifies processes to run more efficient inventory control systems.

The process to register into one used to be lengthy — 9 to 12 months, depending on the industry and if a FTZ is being created vs. expanded. This changed in 2011, when Alternative Site Framework (ASF) was introduced.

== Alternative Site Framework ==
Alternative Site Framework (ASF) provides a streamlined process for foreign-trade zone grantees to quickly expand operations within their given service area. Grantees that have transitioned over to ASF are granted 2,000 "virtual" acres to designate sites within their service area, sometimes as quickly as thirty (30) days. As opposed to the Traditional Site Framework, this ASF option doesn't require a grantee to go through a traditional boundary modification for expansion purposes. Companies now have the option to select between establishing their business in a usage-driven site or a magnet site.

== Usage-driven sites ==
Usage-driven sites are sites within a grantee's service area, that must go through a designation and activation process with the grantee and the Foreign-Trade Zone Board prior to initiating operations. Under ASF, usage-driven sites replace the role that subzones once held – allowing companies to operate under FTZ status while being located outside of what used to be called "general purpose zones" or now known as magnet sites under ASF.

== Magnet sites ==
Magnet sites are usually industrial parks or multi-tenant sites within a grantee's service area, which have already been designated by the Foreign-Trade Zone Board. Once a company that's established in said industrial park wants to operate as an FTZ, it must only go through the designation process with the help of the grantee and local customs. Under ASF, magnet sites replace the role that general purpose zones once held – industrial parks that serve commerce as a public utility.

== Subzones ==
A foreign-trade subzone is an area approved by the Foreign-Trade Zones Board for use by a specific company. Foreign-trade subzone companies enjoy all the same benefits as foreign-trade zone companies, but subzones are located outside existing general-purpose sites within 60 miles of the port of entry. Subzones allow companies that import and/or re-export products to take advantage of foreign-trade zone benefits without having to physically relocate within the foreign-trade zone general purpose sites. These sites are becoming obsolete with the implementation of ASF.

== Alternate options – file for drawback ==
Companies have the ability, utilizing drawback filings, to recoup up to 99% of the duties paid on goods previously imported into the US, that are later exported and drawback can be claimed for goods exported up to three years prior to filing a claim with customs.

== List of zones ==
Foreign-trade zones in the United States
State	FTZ #	Grantee	CBP port of entry
Alabama	82	City of Mobile	Mobile
Alabama	83	Huntsville-Madison County Airport Authority	Huntsville
Alabama	98	City of Birmingham	Birmingham
Alabama	222	Montgomery Area Chamber of Commerce	Birmingham
Alabama	233	Dothan-Houston County Foreign-Trade Zone, Inc.	Panama City
Alaska	108	City of Valdez	Valdez
Alaska	160	Port of Anchorage	Anchorage
Alaska	195	Fairbanks Economic Development Corp.	Fairbanks
Alaska	232	Kodiak Island Borough	Kodiak
Arizona	60	Nogales-Santa Cruz County Economic Development Foundation, Inc.	Nogales
Arizona	75	City of Phoenix	Phoenix
Arizona	139	Arizona Regional Economic Development Foundation	Naco
Arizona	174	Sun Corridor, Inc.	Tucson
Arizona	219	Greater Yuma Economic Development Corp.	San Luis
Arizona	221	City of Mesa	Phoenix
Arizona	277	Greater Maricopa Foreign Trade Zone, Inc.	Phoenix
Arkansas	14	Arkansas Department of Industrial Development	Little Rock
Arkansas	273	City of West Memphis Public Facilities Board	Memphis
California	3	San Francisco Port Commission	San Francisco
California	18	City of San Jose	San Jose
California	50	Board of Harbor Commissioners of the Port of Long Beach	Los Angeles / Long Beach
California	56	City of Oakland	San Francisco
California	143	Port of Sacramento	Sacramento
California	153	City of San Diego	San Diego
California	191	City of Palmdale Economic Development	Los Angeles / Long Beach
California	202	Board of Harbor Commissioners of the City of Los Angeles	Los Angeles / Long Beach
California	205	Board of Harbor Commissioners, Oxnard Harbor District	Port Hueneme
California	226	Board of Supervisors of the County of Merced	Fresno
California	231	Port of Stockton	Stockton
California	236	City of Palm Springs	Palm Springs
California	243	City of Victorville	Victorville
California	244	March Joint Powers Authority	Los Angeles / Long Beach
California	248	City of Eureka	Eureka
California	257	County of Imperial	Calexico
California	276	Kern County	Meadows Field Airport
Colorado	112	Colorado Springs Foreign-Trade Zone, Inc.	Denver
Colorado	123	City and County of Denver	Denver
Colorado	293	Town of Limon	Denver
Colorado	298	Jefferson County Economic Development Corporation	Rocky Mountain Metropolitan Airport
Connecticut	71	Economic and Industrial Development Commission of Windsor Locks	Hartford
Connecticut	76	Bridgeport Port Authority	Bridgeport
Connecticut	162	Greater New Haven Chamber of Commerce	New Haven
Connecticut	208	New London Foreign Trade Zone Commission	New London
Delaware	99	State of Delaware	Wilmington
Florida	25	Broward County	Port Everglades
Florida	32	Greater Miami Foreign Trade Zone, Inc.	Miami
Florida	42	Greater Orlando Aviation Authority	Orlando
Florida	64	Jacksonville Port Authority	Jacksonville
Florida	65	Panama City Port Authority	Panama City
Florida	79	City of Tampa	Tampa
Florida	135	Port of Palm Beach District	West Palm Beach
Florida	136	Canaveral Port Authority	Port Canaveral
Florida	166	Vision Foreign-Trade Zone, Inc.	Miami
Florida	169	Manatee County Port Authority	Port Manatee
Florida	180	Wynwood Community Economic Development Corp.	Miami
Florida	193	Pinellas County Economic Development	St. Petersburg
Florida	198	Volusia County Foreign-Trade Zone	Daytona Beach
Florida	213	Lee County Port Authority	Fort Myers
Florida	215	Sebring Airport Authority	Port Manatee
Florida	218	Treasure Coast Foreign Trade Zone, Inc.	Fort Pierce Station
Florida	241	City of Fort Lauderdale	Port Everglades
Florida	249	Pensacola-Escambia County Promotion & Development Commission	Pensacola
Florida	250	Sanford Airport Authority	Sanford
Florida	281	Miami-Dade County	Miami
Florida	292	City of Leesburg	Leesburg
Georgia	26	Georgia Foreign-Trade Zone, Inc.	Atlanta
Georgia	104	World Trade Center Savannah, LLC	Savannah
Georgia	144	Brunswick and Glynn County Development Authority	Brunswick
Hawaii	9	State of Hawaii	Honolulu
Idaho	242	County of Boundary	Eastport
Idaho	280	Southwest Idaho Manufacturers’ Alliance	Boise
Illinois	22	Illinois International Port District	Chicago
Illinois	31	America’s Central Port District	St. Louis
Illinois	114	Economic Development Council for Central Illinois	Peoria
Illinois	133	Quad-City Foreign-Trade Zone, Inc.	Davenport / Moline / Rock Island
Illinois	146	Bi-State Authority	Evansville
Illinois	176	Greater Rockford Airport Authority	Rockford
Illinois	245	Economic Development Corporation of Decatur & Macon County	Decatur
Illinois	271	Jo-Carroll Foreign Trade Zone Board	Davenport / Moline / Rock Island
Indiana	72	Indianapolis Airport Authority	Indianapolis
Indiana	125	St. Joseph County Airport Authority	Chicago
Indiana	152	Ports of Indiana	Chicago
Indiana	170	Ports of Indiana	Louisville
Indiana	177	Ports of Indiana	Evansville
Indiana	182	City of Fort Wayne	Fort Wayne
Iowa	107	The Iowa Foreign Trade Zone Corp.	Des Moines
Iowa	133	Quad-City Foreign-Trade Zone, Inc.	Davenport / Moline / Rock Island
Iowa	175	Cedar Rapids Airport Commission	Des Moines
Iowa	288	Northwest Iowa Development Corp.	Sioux Falls
Kansas	17	Greater Kansas City FTZ, Inc.	Kansas City
Kansas	161	Board of Commissioners of Sedgwick County	Wichita
Kentucky	29	Louisville & Jefferson County Riverport Authority	Louisville
Kentucky	47	Greater Cincinnati FTZ, Inc.	Cincinnati
Kentucky	294	Paducah-McCracken County Riverport Authority	Evansville
Louisiana	2	Board of Commissioners of the Port of New Orleans	New Orleans
Louisiana	87	Lake Charles Harbor & Terminal District	Lake Charles
Louisiana	124	Port of South Louisiana	Gramercy
Louisiana	145	Caddo-Bossier Parishes Port Commission	Shreveport
Louisiana	154	Greater Baton Rouge Port Commission	Baton Rouge
Louisiana	261	England Economic & Industrial Development District	Morgan City
Louisiana	279	Houma-Terrebonne Airport Commission	Morgan City
Louisiana	291	Cameron Parish Port, Harbor and Terminal District	Lake Charles
Louisiana	300	Plaquemines Port, Harbor & Terminal District	New Orleans
Maine	58	City of Bangor	Bangor
Maine	179	Madawaska Foreign Trade Zone Corp.	Madawaska
Maine	186	City of Waterville	Belfast
Maine	263	Lewiston-Auburn Economic Growth Council	Portland
Maine	282	Midcoast Regional Redevelopment Authority	Portland
Maryland	63	Prince George’s County Government	Washington, DC
Maryland	73	Maryland Department of Transportation	Baltimore
Maryland	74	City of Baltimore	Baltimore
Maryland	255	Cascade Properties & Washington County Board of Commissioners	Baltimore
Massachusetts	27	Massachusetts Port Authority	Boston
Massachusetts	28	City of New Bedford	New Bedford
Massachusetts	201	City of Holyoke	Springfield
Michigan	16	Economic Development Corp. of Sault Ste. Marie	Sault Ste. Marie
Michigan	43	City of Battle Creek	Battle Creek
Michigan	70	Greater Detroit Foreign-Trade Zone, Inc.	Detroit
Michigan	140	City of Flint	Saginaw / Bay City / Flint
Michigan	189	KOM Foreign Trade Zone Authority	Grand Rapids
Michigan	210	Economic Development Alliance of St. Clair County	Port Huron
Michigan	275	Capital Region Airport Authority	Lansing
Minnesota	51	Duluth Seaway Port Authority	Duluth
Minnesota	119	Greater Metropolitan Area FTZ Commission	Minneapolis
Minnesota	259	Koochiching Economic Development Authority	International Falls
Mississippi	92	Mississippi Coast Foreign-Trade Zone, Inc.	Gulfport
Mississippi	158	Greater Mississippi Foreign-Trade Zone, Inc.	Jackson
Mississippi	262	Northern Mississippi FTZ, Inc.	Memphis
Mississippi	287	Tunica County	Memphis
Missouri	15	Greater Kansas City FTZ, Inc.	Kansas City
Missouri	102	St. Louis County Port Authority	St. Louis
Missouri	225	City of Springfield Airport Board	Springfield
Montana	88	Great Falls International Airport Authority	Great Falls
Montana	187	Northern Express Transportation, Inc.	Sweetgrass
Montana	274	City and County of Butte-Silver Bow	Butte-Silver Bow
Nebraska	19	Greater Omaha Chamber of Commerce	Omaha
Nebraska	59	Lincoln Chamber of Commerce	Omaha
Nevada	89	Las Vegas Global Economic Alliance	Las Vegas
Nevada	126	Economic Development Authority of Western Nevada	Reno
New Hampshire	81	Pease Development Authority	Portsmouth
New Jersey	44	State of New Jersey	New York / Newark
New Jersey	49	Port Authority of New York and New Jersey	New York / Newark
New Jersey	142	South Jersey Port Corporation	Salem, New Jersey/Philadelphia
New Jersey	200	County of Mercer	Philadelphia
New Jersey	235	Township of Lakewood	Philadelphia
New Mexico	110	City of Albuquerque Aviation Department	Albuquerque
New Mexico	197	Board of County Commissioners of Dona Ana County	Santa Teresa
New York	1	City of New York	New York / Newark
New York	23	County of Erie	Buffalo
New York	34	Niagara County Industrial Development Agency	Buffalo
New York	37	County of Orange	New York / Newark
New York	52	Suffolk County	John F. Kennedy International Airport
New York	54	Clinton County Area Development Corp.	Champlain
New York	90	County of Onondaga	Syracuse
New York	109	Jefferson County Industrial Development Agency	Alexandria Bay
New York	118	Ogdensburg Bridge and Port Authority	Ogdensburg
New York	121	Capital District Regional Planning Commission	Albany
New York	141	County of Monroe	Rochester
New York	172	County of Oneida	Utica
New York	284	Genesee Gateway Local Development Corp.	Rochester
New York	285	Chenango County	Syracuse
New York	289	Ontario County	Rochester
New York	290	Cortland County	Syracuse
North Carolina	57	Charlotte Regional Partnership, Inc.	Charlotte
North Carolina	93	Triangle J Council of Governments	Raleigh / Durham
North Carolina	214	North Carolina Department of Transportation	Morehead City / Beaufort
North Carolina	230	Piedmont Triad Partnership	Winston-Salem
North Carolina	301	Land of Sky Regional Council	Greenville–Spartanburg
North Dakota	103	Grand Forks Region Economic Development Corp.	Pembina
North Dakota	267	Municipal Airport Authority of the City of Fargo	Fargo
Ohio	8	Toledo-Lucas County Port Authority	Toledo / Sandusky
Ohio	40	Cleveland Cuyahoga County Port Authority	Cleveland
Ohio	46	Greater Cincinnati FTZ, Inc.	Cincinnati
Ohio	100	Greater Dayton Foreign-Trade Zone, Inc.	Dayton
Ohio	101	AMES Material Services, Inc.	Dayton
Ohio	138	Columbus Regional Airport Authority	Columbus
Ohio	151	Findlay/Hancock County Chamber of Commerce	Toledo / Sandusky
Ohio	181	Northeast Ohio Trade & Economic Consortium	Cleveland
Ohio	270	Lawrence County Port Authority	Charleston
Oklahoma	53	City of Tulsa	Tulsa
Oklahoma	106	Port Authority of the Greater Oklahoma City Area	Oklahoma City
Oklahoma	164	Muskogee City-County Port Authority	Tulsa
Oklahoma	227	Rural Enterprises of Oklahoma, Inc.	Dallas / Fort Worth
Oregon	45	Port of Portland	Portland
Oregon	132	International Port of Coos Bay Commission	Coos Bay
Pennsylvania	24	Eastern Distribution Center, Inc.	Wilkes-Barre / Scranton
Pennsylvania	33	Regional Industrial Development Corporation of Southwestern Pennsylvania	Pittsburgh
Pennsylvania	35	Philadelphia Regional Port Authority	Philadelphia
Pennsylvania	147	Corp. of Southern Pennsylvania	Harrisburg
Pennsylvania	247	Erie-Western Pennsylvania Port Authority	Erie
Pennsylvania	254	North Central Pennsylvania Regional Planning and Development Commission	Pittsburgh
Pennsylvania	272	Lehigh Valley Economic Development Corp.	Lehigh Valley
Pennsylvania	295	Pennsylvania Foreign Trade Zone Corp.	Pittsburgh
Puerto Rico	7	Puerto Rico Industrial Development Corp.	Mayaguez
Puerto Rico	61	Puerto Rico Trade and Export Co.	San Juan
Puerto Rico	163	CODEZOL C.D.	Ponce
Rhode Island	105	Rhode Island Economic Development Corp.	Providence
South Carolina	21	South Carolina State Ports Authority	Charleston
South Carolina	38	South Carolina State Ports Authority	Greenville / Spartanburg
South Carolina	127	Richland-Lexington Airport District	Columbia
South Dakota	220	Sioux Falls Development Foundation	Sioux Falls
Tennessee	77	City of Memphis	Memphis
Tennessee	78	Metropolitan Government of Nashville and Davidson County	Nashville
Tennessee	138	Chattanooga Chamber Foundation	Chattanooga
Tennessee	148	Industrial Development Board of Blount County and the Cities of Alcoa and Maryville	Knoxville
Tennessee	204	Tri-Cities Airport Authority	Tri-Cities Airport
Tennessee	223	Memphis International Trade Development Corp.	Memphis
Tennessee	78	Metropolitan Government of Nashville & Davidson County	Shelbyville
Tennessee	283	Northwest Tennessee Regional Port Authority	Memphis
Texas	12	McAllen Foreign Trade Zone	McAllen / Hidalgo County
Texas	36	Board of Trustees of the Galveston Wharves	Houston
Texas	39	Dallas/Fort Worth International Airport Board	Dallas / Fort Worth
Texas	62	Brownsville Navigation District	Brownsville / Los Indios
Texas	68	City of El Paso	El Paso
Texas	80	City of San Antonio Economic Development Dept.	San Antonio
Texas	84	Port of Houston Authority	Houston
Texas	94	City of Laredo	Laredo
Texas	95	Starr County Industrial Foundation	Rio Grande City
Texas	96	City of Eagle Pass	Eagle Pass
Texas	113	Ellis County Trade Zone Corp.	Dallas / Fort Worth
Texas	115	Foreign-Trade Zone of Southeast Texas, Inc.	Port Arthur
Texas	116	Foreign-Trade Zone of Southeast Texas, Inc.	Port Arthur
Texas	117	Foreign-Trade Zone of Southeast Texas, Inc.	Port Arthur
Texas	122	Port of Corpus Christi Authority	Corpus Christi
Texas	149	Port Freeport	Freeport
Texas	150	Westport Economic Development Corp.	El Paso
Texas	155	Calhoun-Victoria Foreign-Trade Zone, Inc.	Port Lavaca / Port Comfort
Texas	156	City of Weslaco	Progreso
Texas	165	City of Midland	Midland
Texas	168	Metroplex International Trade	Dallas / Fort Worth
Texas	171	Liberty County Economic Development Corp.	Houston
Texas	183	Foreign Trade Zone of Central Texas, Inc.	Austin
Texas	196	Alliance Corridor, Inc.	Alliance Airport
Texas	199	Texas City Foreign-Trade Zone Corp.	Houston
Texas	234	Gregg County	Shreveport–Bossier City
Texas	246	City of Waco	Dallas / Fort Worth
Texas	252	City of Amarillo	Amarillo
Texas	258	TexAmericas Center	Shreveport–Bossier City
Texas	260	City of Lubbock	Lubbock
Texas	265	City of Conroe	Houston
Texas	269	Athens Economic Development Corp.	Dallas / Fort Worth
Texas	297	City of Lufkin	Port Arthur / Beaumont
Texas	299	Tyler Economic Development Council	Shreveport–Bossier City
Texas	302	City of Socorro	Tornillo
Utah	30	Salt Lake City Corp.	Salt Lake City
Vermont	55	Greater Burlington Industrial Corp.	Burlington International Airport
Vermont	268	Brattleboro Foreign-Trade Zone LLC	Springfield
Vermont	286	Northeastern Vermont Development Association	Derby Line
Virginia	20	Virginia Port Authority	Norfolk / Newport News
Virginia	137	Washington Dulles Foreign-Trade Zone	Washington Dulles International Airport
Virginia	185	County of Culpeper	Front Royal
Virginia	207	Capital Region Airport Commission	Richmond / Petersburg
Virginia	238	New River Valley Economic Development Alliance, Inc.	New River Valley Airport
Washington	5	Port of Seattle Commission	Puget Sound
Washington	85	Port of Everett	Puget Sound
Washington	86	Port of Tacoma	Puget Sound
Washington	120	Cowlitz Economic Development Council	Longview
Washington	128	Lummi Indian Business Council	Puget Sound
Washington	129	Port of Bellingham	Blaine
Washington	173	Port of Grays Harbor	Aberdeen
Washington	203	Moses Lake Public Corp.	Port of Moses Lake
Washington	212	Puyallup Tribal Foreign-Trade Zone Corp.	Puget Sound
Washington	216	Port of Olympia	Puget Sound
Washington	224	Spokane Airport Board	Spokane
Washington	296	Port of Vancouver USA	Portland
Washington	303	Port of Port Angeles	Port Angeles
West Virginia	229	West Virginia Economic Development Authority	Charleston
West Virginia	240	West Virginia Economic Development Authority	Front Royal
Wisconsin	41	Port of Milwaukee	Milwaukee
Wisconsin	167	Brown County	Green Bay
Wisconsin	266	Dane County	Milwaukee
Wyoming	157	Natrona County International Airport	Natrona County Airport

== See also ==
- Free trade zone
- List of free ports
- Title 15 of the Code of Federal Regulations
