= Pureland Industrial Complex =

American industrial park

Coordinates: 39.770°N 75.371°W

Pureland Industrial Complex is a 3,000-acre (12 km^{2}) industrial park located in Logan Township in Gloucester County, New Jersey, United States. It borders the Delaware River and Raccoon Creek, and is located 12 miles (19 km) south of the ports of Camden and Philadelphia. Interstate 295, U.S. Route 322 and U.S. Route 130 run through it and connect it to major truck routes. SMS Rail Lines connect to Penns Grove Secondary and the national rail network. It was opened in 1975 and is the largest industrial park in the state of New Jersey, and one of the largest in the world.

== Incidents ==
On March 4, 2026, an explosion occurred at the complex, leaving 4 injured and causing major disruptions in the region.

== Companies ==
Companies or organizations with offices, warehouses, or manufacturing facilities in Pureland include:

- Amazon.com
- Mitsubishi
- VWR Scientific
- Mercedes-Benz
- Mannington Mills
- US Postal Service
- Home Depot
- Lockheed Martin
- Nextel
- Pep Boys
- Flowserve
- Target Corporation
