= South Jersey Port Corporation =

Independent port authority

- Formation: March 10, 1925; 101 years ago
- Type: Port district
- Headquarters: 2500 S Broadway; Camden, New Jersey 08104
- Region served: Philadelphia metropolitan area (Burlington, Camden, Gloucester, Salem, Cumberland, Mercer and Cape May counties)
- Affiliations: New Jersey Department of Treasury
- Website: southjerseyport.com

South Jersey Port Corporation (SJPC) is an independent public port authority which operates the ports along the eastern banks of Delaware River in the Philadelphia metropolitan area region of southern New Jersey in the United States. Based in Camden, SJPC was founded in 1928 and changed its name in 1968. It maintains facilities at the Port of Camden, the Port of Paulsboro, and the Port of Salem.

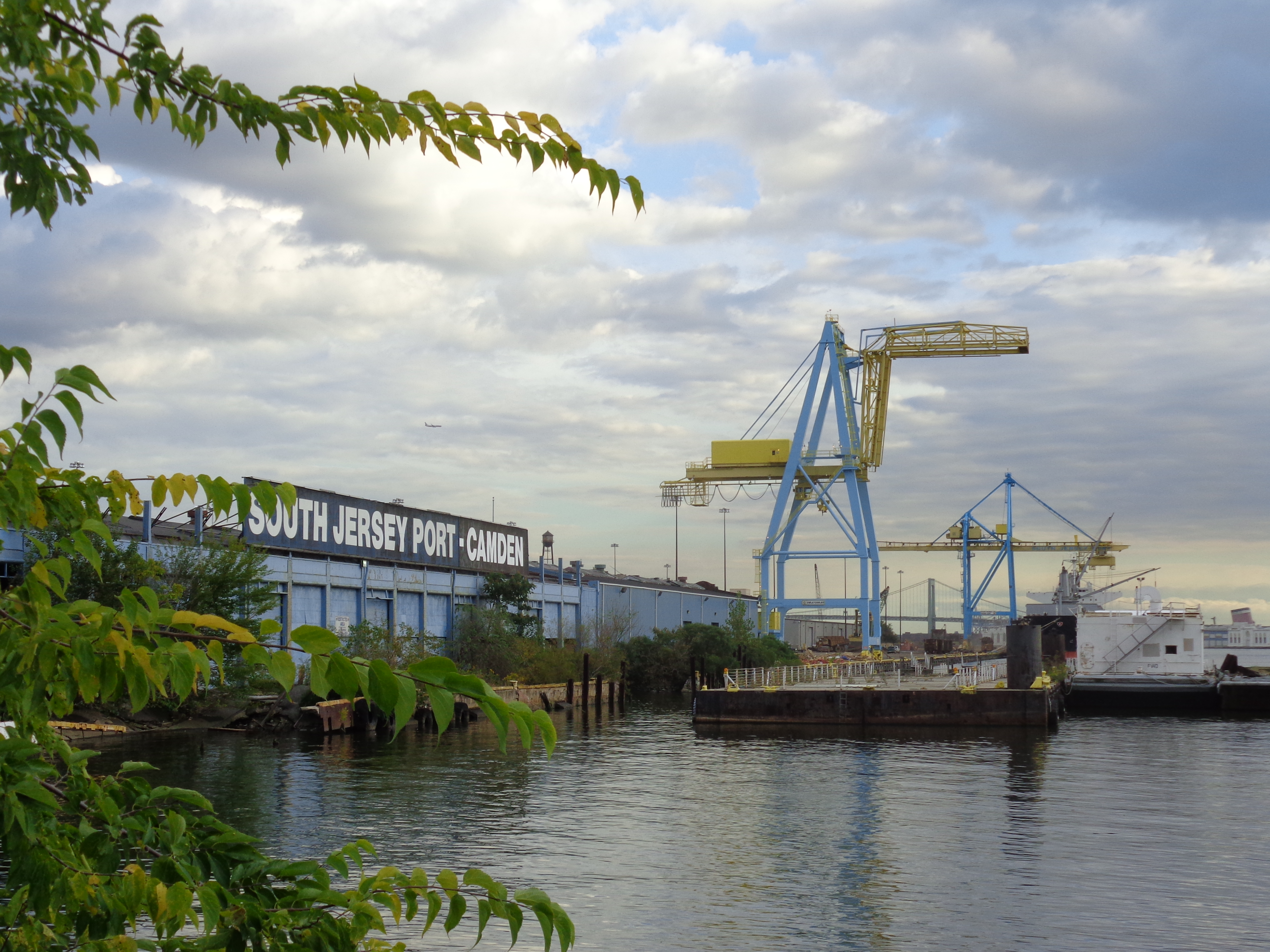
SJPC Balzano Terminal at Camden

== History ==
The SJPC was created pursuant to Chapter 60, P.L. 1968, an act which abolished the South Jersey Port Commission and formed the current corporation. It is governed by a board of directors whose members include the New Jersey State Treasurer, ex officio and 10 public members appointed by the Governor of New Jersey.

== Operations ==
South Jersey Port Corporation provides maritime terminals, commercial, and industrial services at the Port of Camden, the Port of Paulsboro, and the Port of Salem.

The ports handle wood and steel products, project cargo products, break bulk and bulk cargo products, bananas, pineapples, other perishables, cocoa beans, and retail items. It also provides inventory control services, warehouse or crane services, short and long term covered and open storage, and logistic services.

== Free trade zone ==
SJPC is the for licensee the United States Free Trade Zone #142, which includes the Port of Salem and Millville Executive Airport.

== Rail ==
After discharging from vessels, some goods are transferred to rail cars. The ports are served by Conrail's South Jersey/Philadelphia Shared Assets Area based at Pavonia Yard. The South Jersey Port Corporation has worked with Conrail and the counties within the region on rail infrastructure projects including those on the Delair Bridge, Penns Grove Secondary, Vineland Secondary and the Salem Branch.

== See also ==
- Delaware Valley Regional Planning Commission
- Delaware River Joint Toll Bridge Commission
- Delaware River Port Authority
