= Port of Philadelphia =

Coordinates: 39°55′6.1″N 75°8′11.8″W

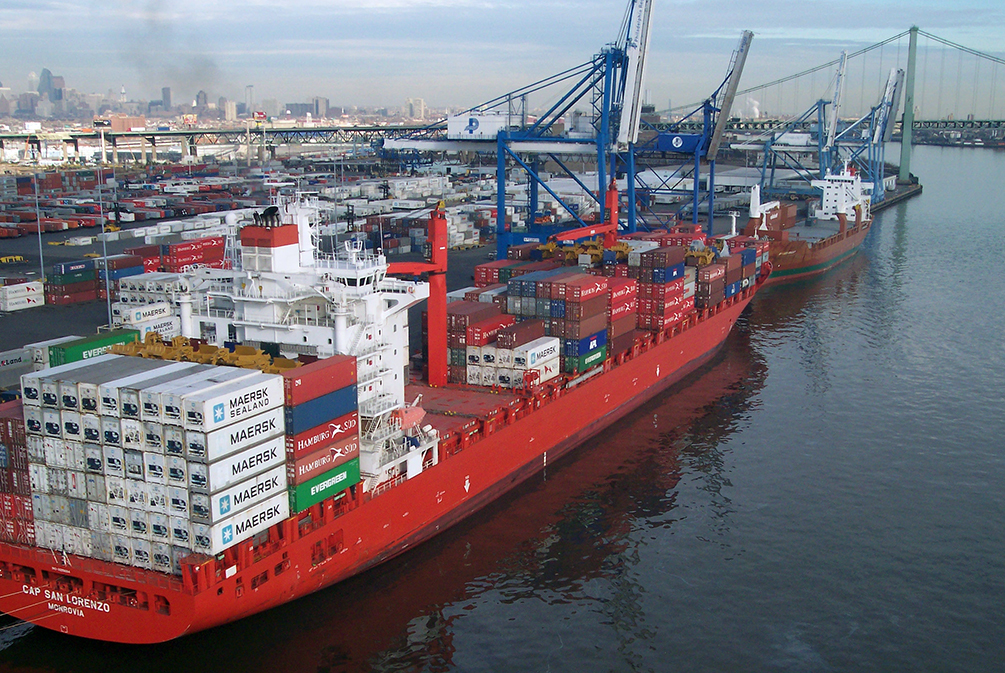
- The port of Philadelphia in February 2016 with Center City Philadelphia in the upper left background
- Interactive map of Port of Philadelphia

Location
- Country: United States
- Location: Philadelphia, Pennsylvania, U.S.

Details
- Operated by: Philadelphia Regional Port Authority
- Owned by: Pennsylvania

Statistics
- Draft depth: 45 feet
- Air draft: 188 feet, restricted by Delaware Memorial Bridge; 143 feet, restricted by Benjamin Franklin Bridge
- Website philaport.com

The port of Philadelphia is located on the Delaware River in Philadelphia in the U.S. state of Pennsylvania.

Port of Philadelphia generally refers to the publicly owned marine terminals located within Philadelphia city limits along the west bank of the river. These terminals are managed by the Philadelphia Regional Port Authority, PhilaPort, an agency of the Commonwealth of Pennsylvania. The term is sometimes used for Delaware River port complex to collectively refer to the ports and energy facilities along the river in the tri-state PA-NJ-DE Delaware Valley region. They include the Port of Salem, the Port of Wilmington, the Port of Chester, the Port of Paulsboro, the Port of Philadelphia, and the Port of Camden. Combined they create one of the largest shipping areas of the United States. In 2016, 2,427 ships arrived at Delaware River port facilities: 577 fruit ships, 474 petroleum ships, and 431 containerized cargo ships.

== PhilaPort (Philadelphia Regional Port Authority) ==
The Philadelphia Regional Port Authority, commonly known as PhilaPort, and referred to as the Port of Philadelphia, is an independent agency of the Commonwealth of Pennsylvania charged with the management, maintenance, marketing, and promotion of port facilities along the Delaware River in Pennsylvania, as well as strategic planning throughout the port district. PhilaPort works with its terminal operators to improve its facilities and to market those facilities to prospective port users around the world. Port cargoes and the activities they generate are responsible for thousands of direct and indirect jobs in the Philadelphia area and throughout Pennsylvania.

On May 22, 2017, The Philadelphia Regional Port Authority (PRPA) announced that it was rebranding as PhilaPort (The Port of Philadelphia) effective immediately. The name ‘PhilaPort’ was decided on to distinguish The Port of Philadelphia from the many other regional authorities.

== Terminals ==
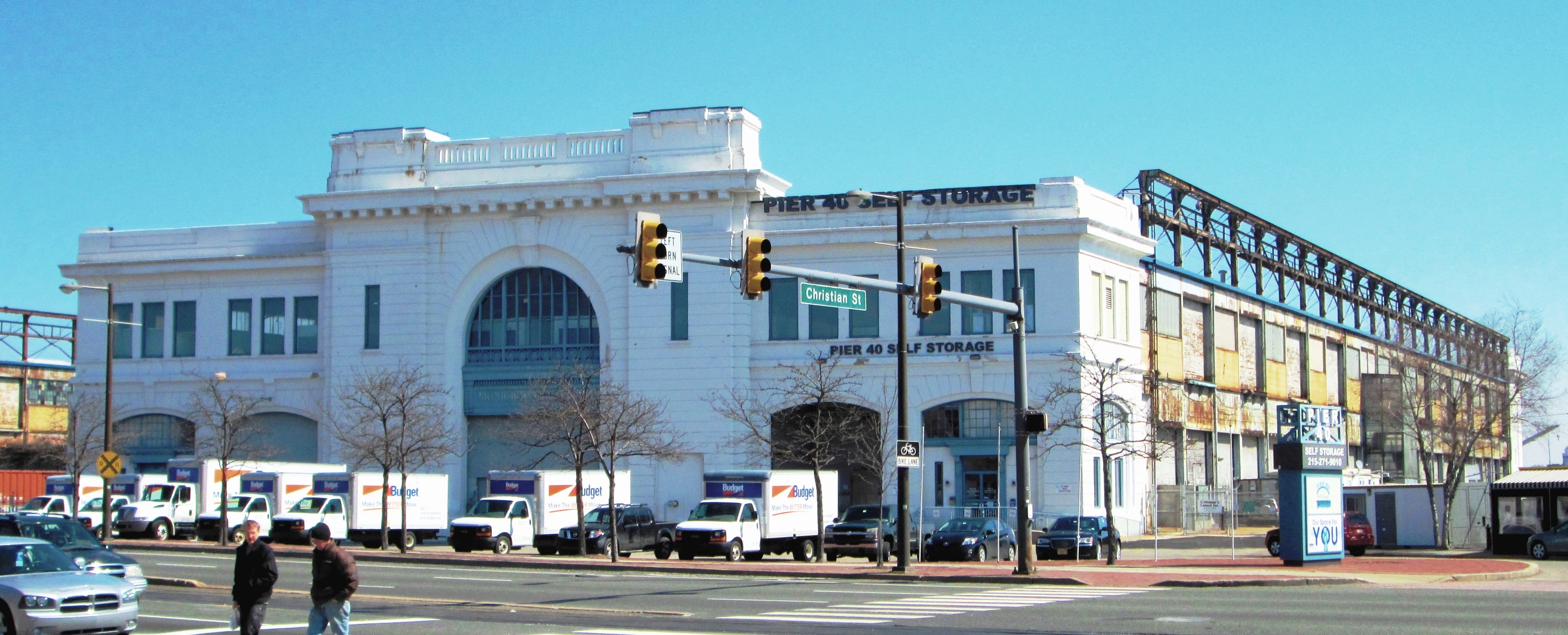
Pier 40 had become self-storage, but closed

The port consists of a series of marine terminals, each with specialized capabilities.

Port of Philadelphia terminal locations
1 Packer Avenue Marine Terminal
2 Tioga Marine Terminal
3 Pier 82
4 Pier 84
5 Philadelphia Forest Products Center – piers 78/80
6 Philadelphia Forest Products Center – piers 38/40
7 Philadelphia Automobile Processing Facility
- Packer Avenue Marine Terminal: This facility handles containers, steel products, frozen meat, fruit, heavy lift cargo, project cargo, and paper on 6 berths plus 1 Ro/Ro berth at a depth of MLW of 45 feet (14 meters). The 160-acre (1 km^{2}) facility features 90,000-square-foot (8,361 m^{2}) of dry storage and 2,200,000-cubic-foot (62,297 m^{3}) of refrigerated storage with 2,500 reefer plugs.
- Tioga Marine Terminal: This facility handles containers, specialized forest products, over-dimensional cargo, palletized cargo, project cargo, break-bulk cargo, and steel on 6 berths at a depth of MLW of 36 to 41 feet (11 to 12 meters). The 116-acre (0 km^{2}) facility features 734,500-square-foot (68,237 m^{2}) of dry storage, of which 90,000-square-foot (8,361 m^{2}) is refrigerated storage with 116 reefer plugs.
- Pier 82: This facility handles fruits and vegetables, break-bulk cargo, project cargo, and paper on 2 berths at a depth of MLW of 32 feet (9.8 meters). The 13.3-acre (0 km^{2}) facility features 130,000-square-foot (12,077 m^{2}) of dry, temperature-controlled storage.
- Pier 84: This facility is dedicated exclusively to cocoa beans and other cocoa products on 1 berth at a depth of MLW of 32 feet (9.8 meters). The 13.9-acre (0 km^{2}) facility features 540,000-square-foot (50,168 m^{2}) of dry storage.
- Philadelphia Forest Products Center: This facility at piers 38, 40, 78, and 80 handles newsprint, coated paper, wood pulp, other forest products, other break-bulk, and semi-bulk products on 2 berths plus 2 Ro/Ro berths at a depth of MLW of 32 feet (9.8 meters). The 44.4-acre (0 km^{2}) facility features 1,143,000-square-foot (106,188 m^{2}) of dry storage.
- Philadelphia Automobile Processing Facility: This facility handles automobiles, project cargo, trucks, and heavy equipment just offshore with immediate access to Packer Avenue Marine Terminal and Pier 96. The 84.2-acre (0 km^{2}) facility features an auto-washing and auto service building.

== Shipyard ==
Hog Island was once the largest shipyard in the nation. In 1917, as part of the World War I effort, the U.S. government contracted American International Shipbuilding to build ships and a shipyard at Hog Island. At the time Hog Island was the largest shipyard in the world, with 50 slipways. The first ship, named SS Quistconck for the Lenape name for the site, was christened August 5, 1918, by Edith Bolling Wilson, wife of U.S. president Woodrow Wilson.

The Philly Shipyard is a private company operating on what was once the Philadelphia Naval Shipyard.

== History ==
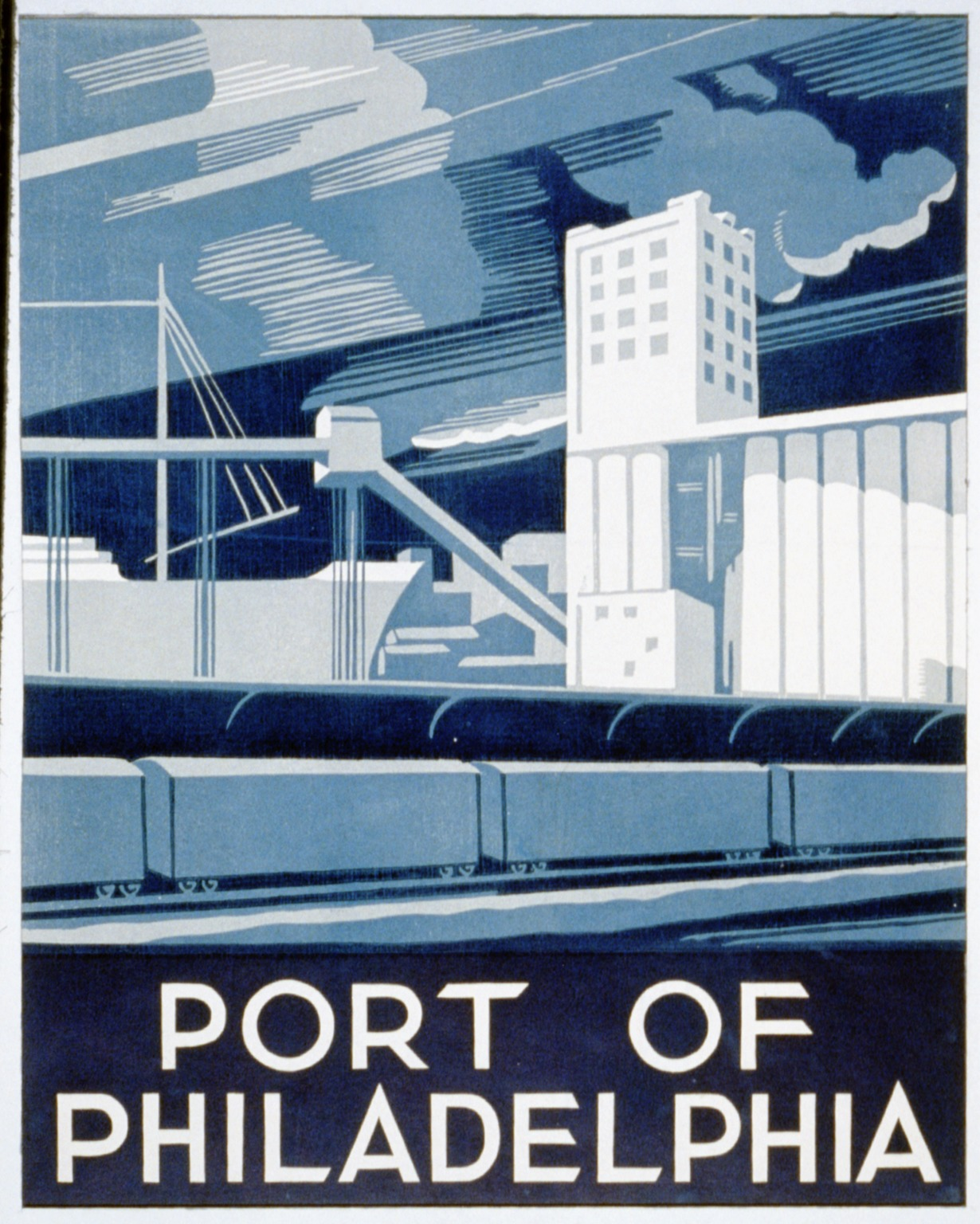
A WPA poster depicting the port in the 1930s

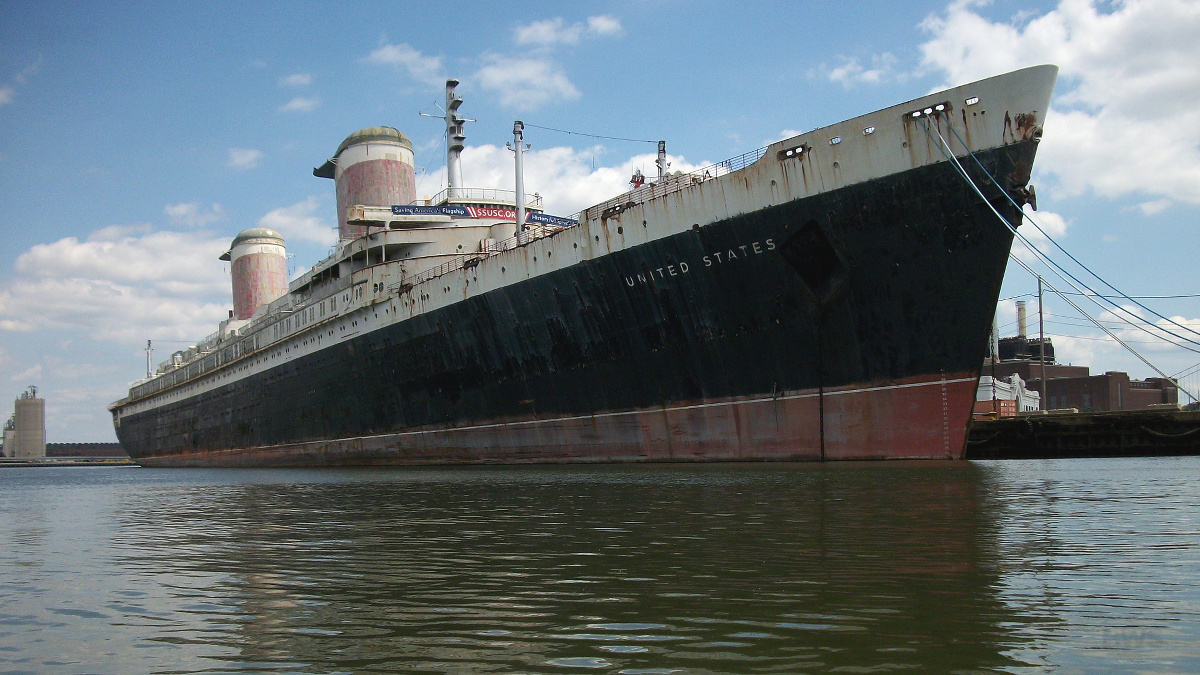
The SS United States, holder of the Blue Riband, berthed at Pier 82

The Port of Philadelphia was established more than 300 years ago during the colonial period, and was for a time the busiest port in both that period and the earliest years of the new republic, finally being eclipsed by the Port of New York. In much of the 20th Century, the Port was overseen by the city's Department of Wharves, Docks, and Ferries, which was replaced by the quasi-public Philadelphia Port Corporation in 1964.

In 1989, following the lead of other municipal ports that made overtures to their respective state governments for capital and operating support, the Port of Philadelphia moved from city to state control, with a new agency, the Philadelphia Regional Port Authority, established by the State Legislature's Act 50 of 1989 to run the Port. The Port of Philadelphia has always been a landlord port, with private companies being given leases to run the Port's facilities, with capital and marketing support provided by the Commonwealth and PRPA. Holt Logistics is the largest private company in the Port of Philadelphia with automobiles and fresh fruit driving imports. In 2024, the Gloucester Marine Terminal (operated by a Holt company, Gloucester Terminals LLC) and the Packer Avenue Marine Terminal (operated by another Holt company, Greenwich Terminals LLC), handled over 88 percent of Chilean fruit on the East Coast, up from 72 percent in 2023, according to Holt. And while overall Moroccan citrus volumes decreased in 2024, the percentage of volume handled in Gloucester and at PAMT increased in 2024, with the region responsible for 76 percent of the volume.

=== Philadelphia Cruise Terminal ===
The Philadelphia Cruise Terminal was located at 5100 South Broad Street within the former Philadelphia Naval Shipyard. The Delaware River Port Authority began operating the terminal in 1998 in Building 3, a landmarked 1874 Navy Yard building. Following the September 11 attacks the Philadelphia terminal accommodated some of the ships that had been diverted from New York. Its peak year was 2006 when it handled 36 cruises. By 2011 the schedule had dwindled to just two cruises. The DRPA decided to close the terminal rather than invest additional operating costs or capital improvements. Its demise was attributed to a combination of the economic downturn, increasing size of cruise ships, and six hours needed to navigate the Delaware River before entering open ocean.

A new PhilaPort Cruise Terminal has broken ground north of Philadelphia International Airport on December 2, 2025 and is slated to open in April 2026 with Norwegian Cruise Lines using it as Philadelphia's exclusive homeport for a minimum of 7 years with 41 sailings a year.

=== Developments ===
==== Delaware River main channel deepening ====
A project to deepen the Delaware River's 103-mile main shipping channel from 40 to 45 feet began in 2010 and was completed in 2017. The $392 million project was funded by the Federal Government and local-match sponsor PhilaPort (using Commonwealth of Pennsylvania general funds).

==== Infrastructure upgrade ====
A $300 million port development plan was announced by the Commonwealth in November 2016, which will expand and improve cargo operations throughout the Port's busiest areas. As part of the $300 million Port Development Plan, the first two of five giant cranes capable of unloading the largest container ships arrived in March 2018 from China, where they were manufactured.

==== Southport Marine Terminal ====
The port facilities at Philadelphia Naval Yard have been repeatedly expanded.

== MSC Gayane cocaine seizure ==
On June 17, 2019, U.S. federal, state and local law-enforcement authorities boarded the container ship MSC Gayane after it arrived at the Packer Avenue Marine Terminal in the Port of Philadelphia. Authorities seized 19.76 tons of cocaine hidden in shipping containers on board the vessel, with an estimated street value of more than US$1 billion. The seizure was described as one of the largest drug seizures in U.S. history and the largest cocaine seizure in the history of the U.S. Customs and Border Protection.. Investigations later found that crew members had loaded cocaine onto the MSC Gayane from speedboats during the voyage. Packages were lifted onto the vessel using the ship’s crane before being concealed among the legitimate cargo and secured inside containers.

Several crew members later pleaded guilty to charges connected with the smuggling operation, and multiple members of the crew received prison sentences for their involvement. Following the discovery, U.S. Customs and Border Protection seized the MSC Gayane in July 2019 under a federal seizure warrant while legal proceedings concerning the vessel were considered. The case became notable both for the scale of the cocaine seizure and for the use of a large commercial container vessel as part of an international drug-smuggling operation.

== Leadership ==
In 2016, Jeff Theobald, a maritime industry professional with experience in terminal operations and shipping logistics, became the new executive director and CEO. In 2026, Rich Lazer, a former Deputy Mayor for Labour in Philadelphia, became the new executive director and CEO.

== See also ==
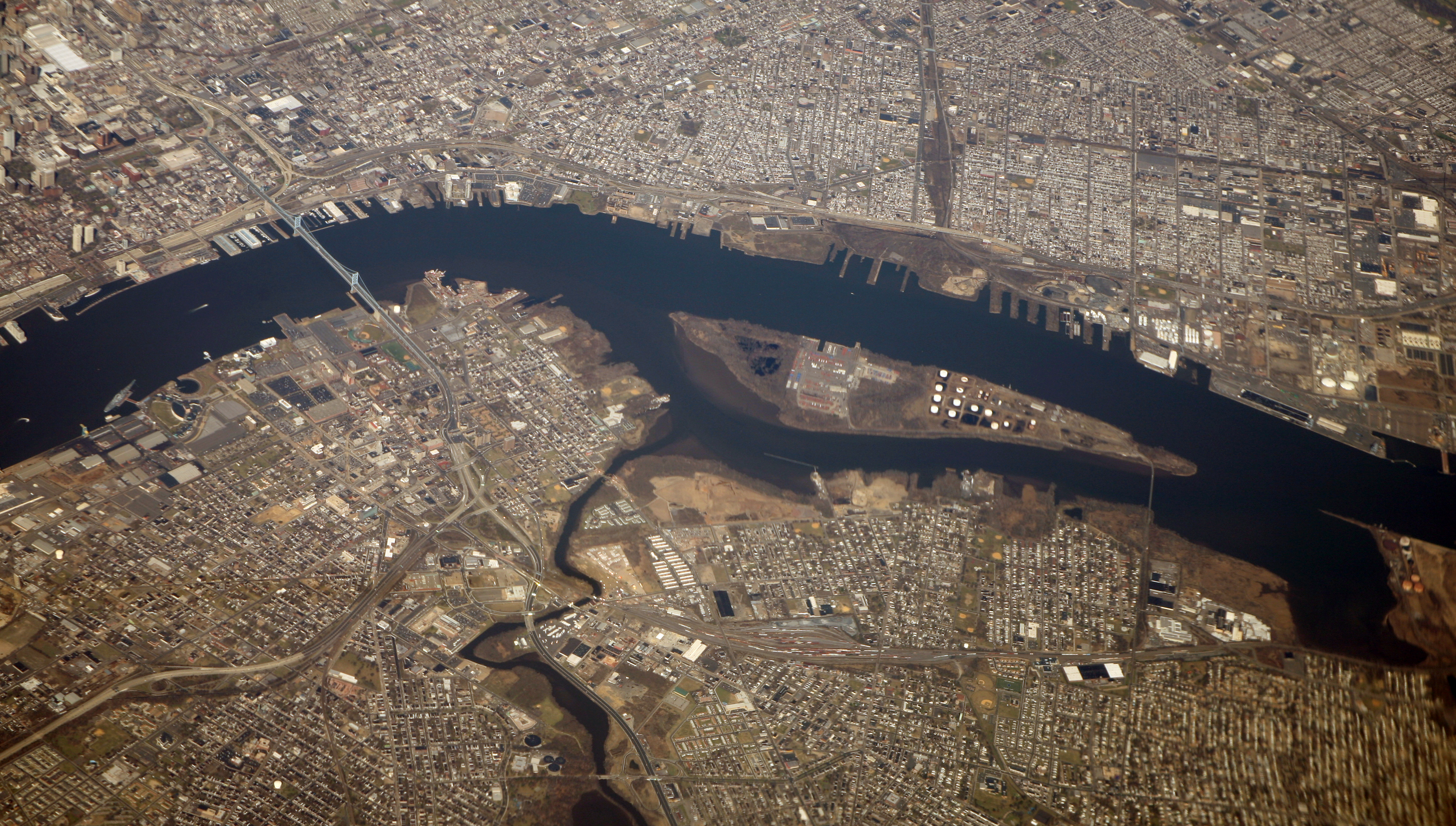
An aerial view of the Philadelphia and Camden waterfronts

- Philadelphia International Airport, located to the southwest along the Delaware River
- Philadelphia Naval Shipyard, located to the southwest along the Delaware River
- Port of Camden, across the Delaware
- Port of Paulsboro
- Port of Wilmington (Delaware)
