= Nustar =

Nustar can refer to:

- Nuštar, a village in eastern Croatia
- NuStar Energy, a petrochemical distributor in the United States
- Nustar Resort & Casino, integrated resort and casino development in Cebu City, Philippines
- NuSTAR, a space-based X-ray telescope to survey for black holes
