= Delaware City Refinery =

Oil refinery in Delaware City, Delaware

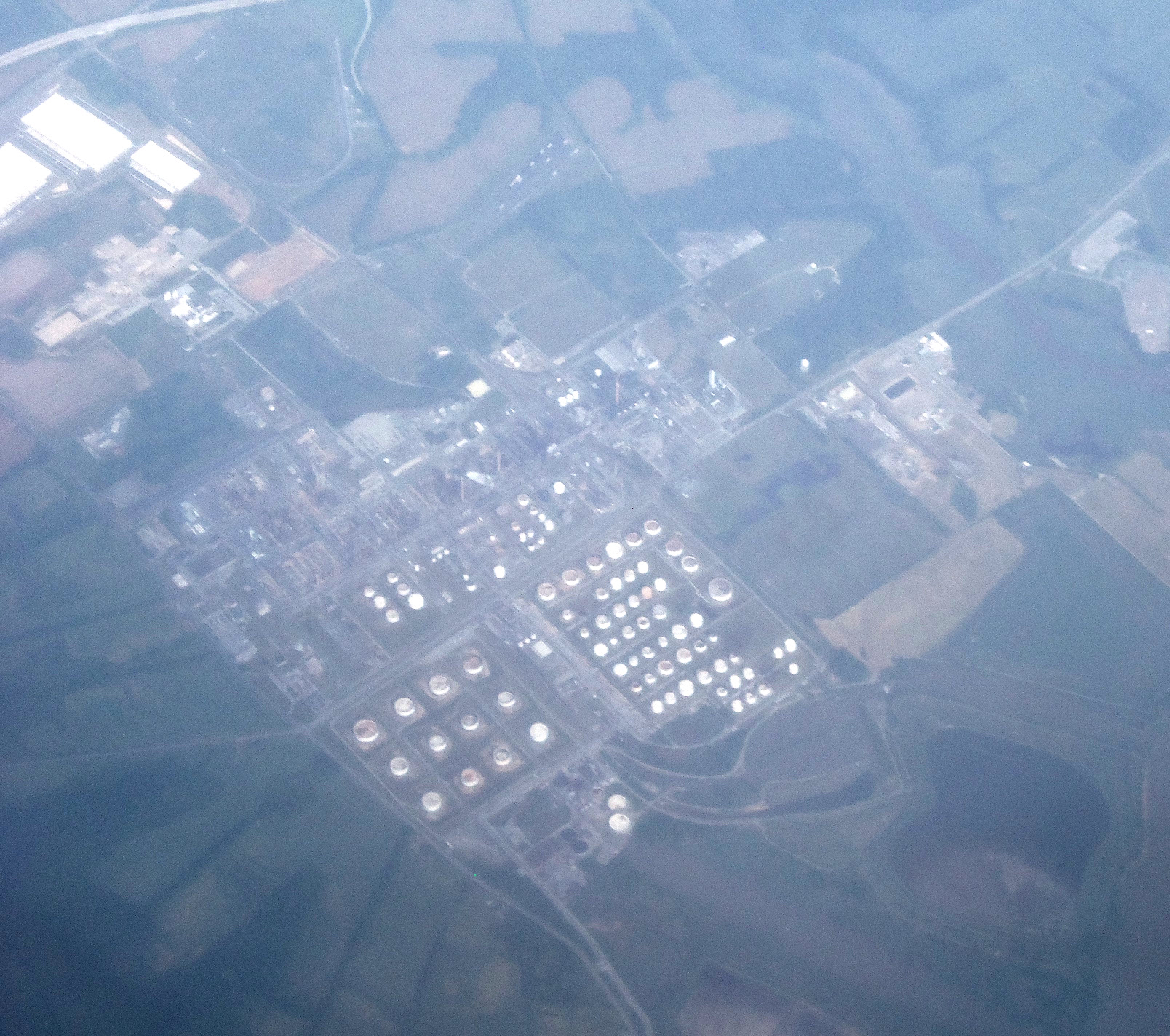
- Aerial view of the Refinery in 2021

- Location of the Delaware City Refinery Delaware City Refinery (the United States)
- Location: Delaware City, Delaware, United States; 39.5809°N 75.6309°W

Refinery details
- Owner: Delaware City Refining Corporation
- Opened: 1956
- Capacity: 210,000 barrels per day (33,000 m^{3}/d)
- No. of employees: 570

The Delaware City Refinery, currently owned by Delaware City Refining Corporation, a subsidiary of PBF Energy, is an oil refinery in Delaware City, Delaware. When operational it has a total throughput capacity of 210,000 barrels per day (33,000 m^{3}/d), and employs around 570 individuals.

The refinery was commissioned in 1956 and Getty Oil operated it up until 1984, when Texaco bought Getty. In 1988, Star Enterprises, a company started when Saudi Aramco bought half interest, took over the refinery until 1998, when Motiva Enterprises, a joint venture between Star (Saudi Aramco) and Shell, operated it. Motiva's operation was the most controversial, with many lawsuits resulting from an explosion and many federal emission regulations violations. Premcor Refining Group bought the refinery from Motiva in 2004, but Valero acquired Premcor a year later.

On 20 November 2009, the refinery was shut down permanently as part of cost-cutting measures by Valero Energy Corporation. Anticipated economic impacts of the closure include major reductions in tax revenue and retail sales for Delaware City, increased materials acquisition cost for petroleum products re-sellers and an increase to consumer gasoline prices in the longer term.

On 25 January 2010, Petroplus, the largest independent refining company in Europe, announced its interest in buying the refinery.

In June 2010, it was announced that the Delaware City Refinery was purchased by PBF Energy Partners for $220 million. The refinery was expected to reopen in Spring 2011.

PBF Energy announced that the restart of the refinery was completed successfully on 7 October 2011. The refinery processes heavy sour crude.

The refinery occupies more than 5,000 acres of land, making it one of the largest industrial facilities in North America.

== Sulfuric acid tank explosion ==
On July 17, 2001, a 415,000-gallon tank at the Refinery exploded from a spark from carbon-arc welding while holding spent sulfuric acid—a mix of sulfuric acid, water, and hydrocarbons. The explosion resulted in the death of one worker and injuries to others. Over one million gallons of sulfuric acid were released from the tank area, with approximately 100,000 gallons spilling into the Delaware River, leading to the deaths of an estimated 2,400 fish and 240 crabs.

The incident was subject to a year-long investigation by the U.S. Chemical Safety Board. The investigation found that (excerpted):

Motiva did not have rules to limit high-temperature cutting (welding) that could generate molten metal and sparks from being performed directly above a corroded hazardous storage tank that had holes in its roof and shell and was known to contain flammable vapors.

The incident likely would have been prevented if safety management processes had been adequately implemented. Motiva did not consider the tank farm to be covered by the requirements of the OSHA Process Safety Management Standard, which sets safety standards for various chemical operations. The Board recommended that OSHA take steps to include such tanks farms under its regulatory system going forward.

There were three root causes of the tragic accident. 1) the company did not have an adequate mechanical integrity management system, 2) there was an inadequate system for managing engineering, and 3) the hot work program was inadequate.

In 2005, Motiva pleaded guilty to the incident and negligently endangering workers at its former refinery. It was sentenced with a $10 million criminal fine and three years of probation. In addition, Motiva agreed to a $12 million settlement for a joint federal-state civil lawsuit due to the explosion. The settlement covered civil penalties, environmental projects, and reimbursement for response costs. Motiva will also funded environmental projects worth over $4 million. Valero, the refinery's next owner, then implemented additional safety measures costing $7.5 million to prevent another incident similar to the Sulfuric Acid Tank explosion. The total settlement, valued at nearly $23.7 million, resolves claims under various federal and state environmental laws, making it one of the largest settlements for such violations in Delaware.

The family of the 50-year old boilermaker who was killed in the incident sued Motiva for its culpability. They won a $36.4 million settlement in 2003.

== Units ==
According to PBF's filings with the US DOE's Energy Information Agency, the unit capacities for the Delaware City Refinery are presented below:

Units	Capacity in BPCD
Total Refinery Nameplate	180,000
Atmospheric Distillation	180,000
Vacuum Distillation	104,600
Fluid Coking	54,500
FCC	82,000
Hydrocracking	25,000
Naphtha Reforming	43,000
Aklylation	12,500
ULSD Hydrotreating	52,000
Naphtha Hydrotreating for Reforming	58,800
Kero Jet Hydrotreating	16,500
Gasoline Hydrotreating	33,000
Other Hydrotreating	20,000
Aromatics Extraction	5,191
Isobutane	6,000
Hydrogen Production in mmscf/d	65

Both the fluid coker and the FCC regenerator have independent wet gas scrubbers that were installed for about $200 million per unit in 2005 according to Valero's refinery tour presentation.

The refinery is highly complex with a Nelson Complexity Index of 13.6.

In 2020, due to the impact of COVID on the business causing serious financial distress, PBF sold the hydrogen plant at Delaware City to Air Products and Chemicals. The sale was part of a 3-refinery hydrogen plant transaction and netted $530 million for PBF.

== Emissions performance ==
As a major emitting facility, The PBF Delaware City Refinery and Petrochemical Site must report its complete greenhouse gas emissions to the EPA every year subject to the EPA's Greenhouse Gas Reporting Program.

Year	Total Reported Direct Emissions	CO2 Emissions Non-Biogenic	Methane Emissions	Nitrous Oxide Emissions
	metric ton	metric ton	metric ton	metric ton
2023	3,416,063	3,405,473	3,964	6,626

== Other ==
The refinery is active in its community and donated $218,000 to charities and non-profits in 2023. In 2021, the refinery fundraiser generated $140,000 for donation to 16 local charities.
