= Coastal Corporation =

Defunct American energy corporation

The Coastal Corporation
- Industry: Energy
- Founded: 1955
- Defunct: 2001
- Fate: Acquired by El Paso Corporation
- Headquarters: Greenway Plaza; Houston, Texas

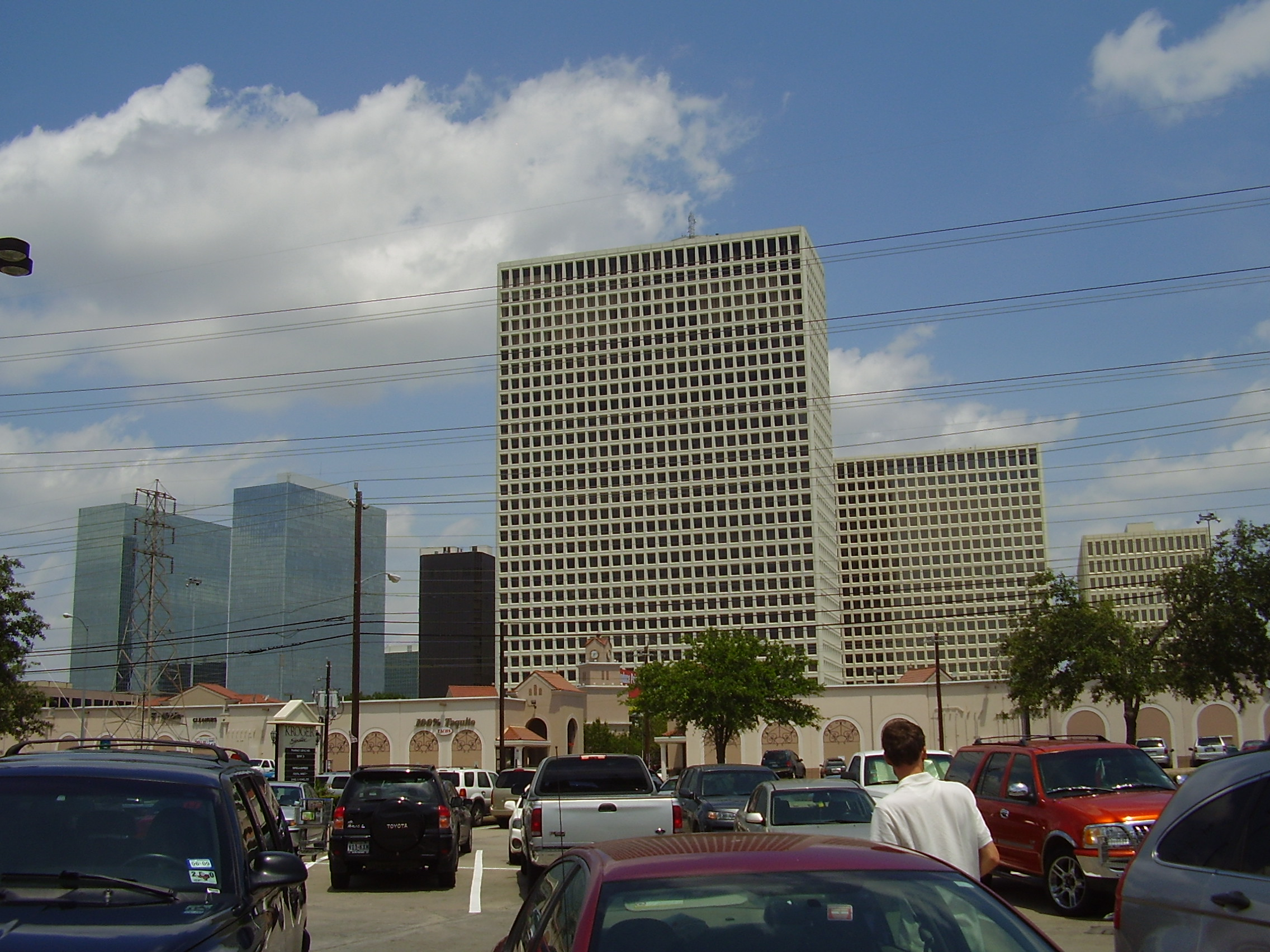
Greenway Plaza, where Coastal was headquartered

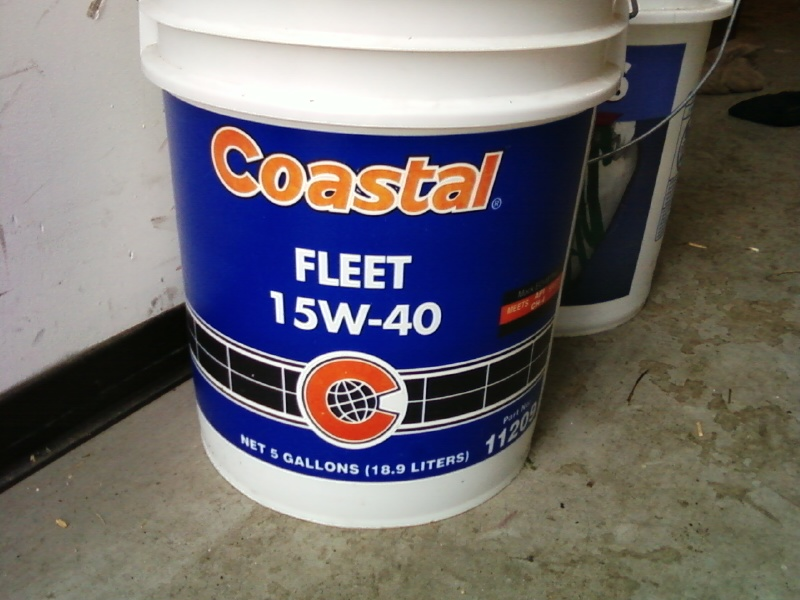
A five-gallon bucket of Coastal brand motor oil

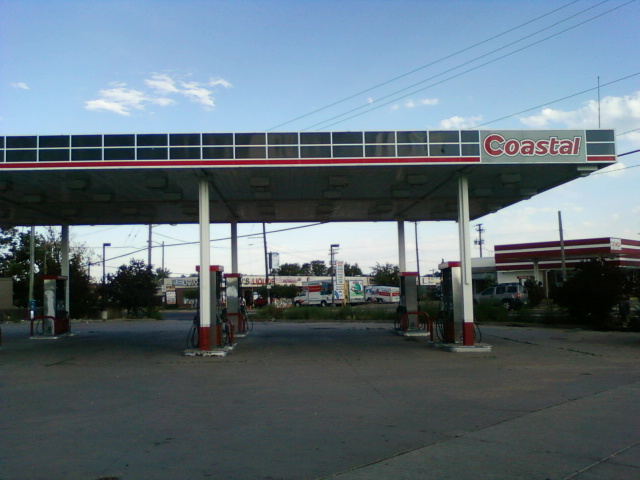
An abandoned Coastal gas station in 2011

Coastal Corporation was an American diversified energy and petroleum products company headquartered at 9 Greenway Plaza (Coastal Tower) in Greenway Plaza, Houston, Texas. The company was founded in 1955 by Oscar Wyatt and incorporated in 1955 as Coastal States Gas Producing Company. It merged with the El Paso Corporation in 2001. As of 1999, Coastal was a Fortune 500 company with 13,300 employees and annual revenues of $8.2 billion.

== Products ==
Coastal produced and marketed petroleum, natural gas, electricity, and coal. It also sold gasoline at Coastal-branded gas stations. By 1999, Coastal Refining and Marketing operated 962 gas stations in 33 states and was supplied by four refineries, including a 150,000 bbl per day refinery in Corpus Christi, Texas, a 180,000 bbl per day refinery in Eagle Point, New Jersey, a 250,000 barrel per day refinery on Aruba, and a 25,000 bbl per day refinery geared for asphalt production in Chickasaw, Alabama. Coastal Corporation also owned and operated a fleet of oil tankers, tugs, and barges. Sales in 1991 totaled $9.549 billion. Coastal Corporation supplied marine diesel in the Caribbean, natural gas in Colorado, and heating oil in the Northeast.

Coastal was a natural gas producer and distributor along with competitors Enron, Williams Companies, and El Paso Energy with which Coastal later merged. Coastal produced, gathered, processed, transported, stored and marketed natural gas throughout the United States and by the 1990s, Coastal's 20,000-mile pipeline network transported five billion cubic feet of natural gas daily. These pipelines include the Iroquois and Great Lakes pipeline, completed in 1991, and the Empire State Pipeline, completed in 1992.

== Founder Oscar Wyatt ==
Founder Oscar Wyatt was born into poverty in Beaumont, Texas. He was abandoned by an alcoholic father and was raised by a single mother in Navasota, Texas. Wyatt served in World War II and was decorated and wounded twice as a bomber pilot. Earning a degree in mechanical engineering from Texas A&M University, he gained experience in the oil business selling drill bits from the trunk of his Ford Coupe. He later worked for Kerr-McGee and Reed Roller Bits before becoming a partner in Wymore Oil Company. Wyatt founded Coastal States Gas Producing Company in 1955.

Like Wyatt, Coastal began business in modest circumstances, with 68 mi (109 km) of pipeline and 78 employees. Wyatt was both beloved and hated, litigious and charitable. As a personal friend of Iraq's Saddam Hussein and business partner to Libya's Muammar Gaddafi, Wyatt urged President George H. W. Bush not to go to war with Iraq over Kuwait and later negotiated with Saddam to secure the release of western hostages being held in Baghdad. A 2007 Texas Monthly magazine article called Wyatt the real "JR Ewing" of the oil business, and described Oscar and his wife Lynn Sakowitz (a fixture of the Houston social fashion scene) together as "the beauty and the beast".

While El Paso Energy was selling Coastal's petroleum marketing and production assets off piece-by-piece to competitors Valero Energy, Sunoco, and ConocoPhillips, Oscar Wyatt was being investigated for illegally doing business with Iraq's Saddam Hussein in violation of United Sanctions that strictly regulated Iraqi sales of crude oil. In 2007, Oscar Wyatt pleaded guilty in a U.S. federal court to illegally sending payments to Iraq under the Oil-for-Food Programme. At his sentencing hearing, Wyatt's attorney Gerald Shargel (who also defended Mafia boss John Gotti) pointed to a commission report, led by former Federal Reserve Board chairman Paul Volcker, that concluded that about half of the 4,500 companies in the Oil-for-Food Program paid a total of $1.8 billion in kickbacks and illicit surcharges to Saddam's regime. Wyatt's defense also floated the issue of "vindictive prosecution"—that is, the Bush administration singling out its old nemesis in both the oil patch and politics, Oscar Wyatt, for punishment but leaving other possible violators of the sanctions alone. Prosecutors, in turn, amassed a daunting paper trail and rewarded a few former Iraqi petrocrats with help in obtaining U.S. green cards—as long as they agreed to testify against sanction breakers like Wyatt.

== Corporate history ==
=== Early years ===
Coastal was founded in 1955. The original company name was Coastal States Gas Producing Company.

=== 1970s: Rapid expansion ===
In the early 1970s events in the Middle East overshadowed the rise of Coastal. The Arab-dominated Organization of Petroleum Exporting Countries (OPEC), by presenting a united front, began to win price increases. In 1971, OPEC cut production and raised prices by 70 percent, and by 1974 prices had quadrupled, leading to the 1970s energy crisis. LoVaca, Coastal's pipeline subsidiary, had signed fixed-price contracts to supply cities in south Texas with natural gas. With energy prices soaring and supplies dwindling, LoVaca could not meet its contractual obligations. At one point it cut off gas supplies to the cities of San Antonio and Austin during the winter. Wyatt then obtained regulatory permission to increase prices beyond the limits specified in the contracts.

LoVaca was the target of lawsuits by outraged customers. Its difficulties caused problems for Coastal for years. Coastal finally settled $1.6 billion in lawsuits by agreeing to spin-off LoVaca. The spin-off, Valero Energy Corporation, formed on December 31, 1979, from LoVaca and other Coastal assets, had annual revenues of about $1 billion. The customers suing Coastal received 55 percent of Valero's stock, with the remaining split among Coastal shareholders, not including Wyatt. At the plaintiffs' insistence, he was excluded from the agreement.

Despite the impact of the energy crisis, Coastal maintained its profitability and continued to expand throughout the 1970s. The expansion was not confined to Texas. In 1973, Coastal acquired Colorado Interstate Gas Company, formerly the Derby Oil Company of Wichita, Kansas, along with its three refineries in a $182 million hostile bid. With the acquisition, Coastal became a national company. In 1973, Wyatt renamed the company Coastal States Gas Corporation.

In the first half of the decade, Coastal also sought to diversify into other energy markets. In 1973 it entered the coal mining field with the acquisition of Southern Utah Fuel Company. Also in 1973, with the acquisition of Union Petroleum Corporation, renamed Belcher New England, Inc., Coastal began the marketing and distribution of petroleum products. By 1975 revenues had reached $1.9 billion. Coastal's expansion continued in 1976 with the purchase of Pacific Refining Company's plant in Hercules, California, which increased its refining capacity to about 300,000 barrels per day. In 1977 Coastal acquired Miami-based Belcher Oil Company, one of the largest marketers of fuel oils in the Southeast.

=== 1980s: Name change and legal issues ===
In 1980, Wyatt changed the company's name to Coastal Corporation. In the same year revenues exceeded $5 billion. In 1980 in Houston, Wyatt and two other oil executives pleaded guilty to criminal violations of federal crude oil pricing regulations. Wyatt and the president of Coral Petroleum were each fined $40,000. Each company was required to refund $9 million to the U.S. Department of the Treasury, and each incurred $1 million in civil penalties. Economic recession and an oversupply of oil and natural gas, as well as conservation by consumers, led to Coastal's first loss, which amounted to $96.4 million for the year 1981. Wyatt trimmed the workforce and cut the budget, and within six months he had restored the company to profitability.

In the mid-1980s the U.S. government sought to foster competition in the natural gas industry through deregulation. The new government policy, together with falling prices, created difficulties for many energy companies. Coastal not only survived deregulation it took full advantage of the competitive atmosphere by launching hostile takeover bids for other struggling energy companies. The mere threat of a takeover by Coastal could send the stock price of a target company soaring. In 1983, for example, Coastal's attempt to secure Texas Gas Resources failed, yet Coastal's initial investment in the company generated a total of $26.4 million in profits. Intervening companies that came to the rescue of Texas Gas Resources were forced to buy up shares held by Coastal at inflated prices. Wyatt's unsuccessful attempt to take over Houston Natural Gas in 1984 yielded a similar return of $42 million through greenmail. In 1985 Wyatt set about acquiring American Natural Resources (ANR), a natural gas pipeline in the Midwest. Despite ANR's initial determination to stay free of Coastal's clutches, Wyatt pushed through an all-cash deal of $2.45 billion, which ANR shareholders could not refuse. The acquisition transformed Coastal into a major power in the U.S. gas business.

In 1987, despite sanctions prohibiting U.S. companies from dealing with Libya because of its terrorist connections, Wyatt negotiated a deal in which Libya supplied oil to Coastal's refinery in Hamburg, Germany. Wyatt's deal was legal because foreign subsidiaries of U.S. companies were exempt from U.S. regulations.

In the late 1980s, Coastal took advantage of improved economic relations between the United States and the People's Republic of China. In 1988 Coastal concluded an agreement with China National Chemicals Import and Export Corporation (Sinochem) for joint ownership of Coastal's Pacific Refining Company. Coastal and Sinochem each held a 50 percent interest in the West Coast refiner. The agreement provided certain advantages for both sides. Sinochem obtained an opportunity to invest in the United States as well as a long-term outlet for crude oil, and Coastal secured a dependable supply of crude oil in a volatile world oil market. This joint venture represented the first investment in U.S. energy assets by China.

A key to the company's successful strategy was the continued high productivity of all Coastal employees, from unskilled workers to those in management. Coal workers employed by Coastal produced twice the industry average, and the expectations for Coastal's management staff were high. Indeed, the constant pressure for results led to a high management turnover, with Coastal's refinery business alone having five different managers between 1980 and 1989.

=== 1990s: Acquisitions and steady growth ===
The U.S. government took action against Coastal's agreement with Libya in 1991 by prohibiting U.S. citizens from working for the venture. This act did not dissuade Wyatt from further deals with countries in the Middle East. Coastal bought large amounts of Iraqi crude in the 1980s, and prior to the commencement of the Persian Gulf War, Wyatt offered to sell Iraqi President Saddam Hussein part of the company's international marketing and refining operations. U.S. sanctions against Iraq following the war prevented Coastal from purchasing Iraqi oil, but Wyatt maintained close relations with Iraq in hopes of gaining access to the oil at some time in the future.

In 1992 Coastal shut down its Derby refinery in Kansas when its refining and marketing division reported an operating loss of $192 million, but the company continued to grow, seeking acquisitions and joint ventures to streamline operations. In the following year, in fact, Coastal adopted an aggressive growth strategy. Through its subsidiary ANR Pipeline Company, Coastal completed construction on the Empire State Pipeline, a 156 mi (251 km) line that ran from Niagara Falls to Syracuse, New York. ANR held a 50 percent interest in the pipeline, and Union Enterprises Ltd. held the remaining half. Also in 1993, the company acquired Soldier Creek Coal Co. and Sage Point Coal Co., both subsidiaries of Sun Co., Inc.

Wyatt gave up his post as CEO in 1995 but continued as chairman. David A. Arledge, the company president, became its CEO as well. In early 1995, through subsidiary Coastal Oil & Gas Corp., Coastal gained an interest in several producing fields, off the coast of Louisiana, from Koch Hydrocarbons, Inc. The company also acquired working interests in two dozen wells in the Utah area from Snyder Oil Corporation and bought the marketing assets of Exxon Corporation's subsidiary Esso Petrolera, S.A., located on the Caribbean island of Aruba.

In 1996, Coastal entered into discussions with Westcoast Energy Inc. to form a joint venture to market natural gas and electricity and to provide energy management services. The venture, which would create one of the largest marketers of natural gas and electricity in North America, was named Engage Energy. To procure funds for additional ventures, Coastal sold its Utah coal mining operations for approximately $610 million in late 1996. The company planned to keep its coal operations in the eastern United States.

When Wyatt stepped down as chairman in 1997, Arledge gained the additional post. In that year Coastal acquired an 11 percent interest in the 1,900 mi (3,100 km) Alliance Pipeline, designed to move natural gas from western Canada to the Chicago region. Construction of the pipeline continued through the late 1990s. In 1999 Coastal announced plans to develop a 700 mi (1,100 km) pipeline running from Mobile, Alabama, to Tampa Bay, Florida. The proposed Gulfstream Natural Gas System pipeline was designed to serve the growing natural gas and energy demand in Florida. It was projected that the pipeline would be completed by 2002.

In the late 1990s, Coastal focused on its natural gas business. With excess reserves of crude oil and low refining margins, the global oil industry was in a state of chaos. The North American natural gas market, on the other hand, was a regional market, largely unaffected by global oil market conditions. In addition, according to Coastal, by 2010 the demand for natural gas was expected to grow considerably, from 22 trillion cubic feet to 30 trillion cubic feet per year. The company, therefore, chose to invest heavily in its natural gas operations, targeting the primary natural gas supply areas, which included the Gulf of Mexico, south Texas, the Rocky Mountains, and Canada. In June 1998 the company acquired additional interest in natural gas assets in Alabama, including a processing plant and a pipeline.

To bolster its exploration and production operations, Coastal upped its exploration and production budget by $100 million in 1998 and by $290 million in 1999. Coastal acquired oil and gas assets in northeastern Utah and western Colorado in late 1998. The company also acquired properties in the Texas Coastal Plain, a region that accounted for 45 percent of Coastal's net gas production in 1998. By February 1999 Coastal had seven oil rigs in operation. In the Gulf of Mexico region, Coastal built five drilling and production platforms in 1998. Coastal also sought international opportunities for its exploration and production operations in the late 1990s. The company announced plans to start exploration in Australia, and in October 1998 Coastal signed a deal with Petrobras, Brazil's national oil company.

Although Coastal concentrated on boosting its natural gas operations, the company continued to implement its growth strategy in other divisions. In Coastal's electric power business, the company increased its interest in a cogeneration plant in Midland, Michigan, from 10.9 to 20.4 percent in 1998. In 1999 Coastal announced plans to build a power plant in Colorado and indicated that it had reached an agreement with the Public Service Company of Colorado regarding the purchase of power. Coastal also participated in numerous international projects. In early 1999 Coastal purchased a 24.5 percent stake in a hydroelectric plant in Panama and also began operations at its Nicaragua plant. The company acquired a 66.7 percent interest in a power plant in Bangladesh and continued work on two projects in Pakistan, which were scheduled to be operational in 1999. Coastal hoped to have its Guatemala coal-fired power plant, which began construction in 1997, operational by early 2000. In September 1999 Coastal announced that, with GENER S.A., a South American electricity company, it had purchased 50 percent of the Itabo Generation Company from the Dominican Republic. Itabo owned six thermal plants near the country's capital.

Coastal's refinery facilities expanded operations in the late 1990s as well. In July 1998 the company signed a five-year deal with PMI Comercio Internacional, S.A. de C.V., a marketing subsidiary of Mexico's national oil company, Petroleos Mexicanos, in which PMI agreed to supply crude for Coastal's refinery in Aruba. Coastal began expanding the Aruba refinery in September. In 1997 Coastal entered into discussions with Venezuela's national oil company, Petróleos de Venezuela S.A. (PDVSA), regarding a venture involving Coastal's Corpus Christi refinery facilities. Coastal's refinery in Eagle Point, New Jersey, was busy in 1998 as well. In June Coastal finalized an agreement concerning the supply of crude with Norway's state oil company, Statoil Group.

In other 1998 developments, Coastal sold or closed nearly 100 retail stores, including 64 Coastal Mart stores in the Midwest, to adhere to the company's decision to dispense with nonessential businesses. The stores continued to operate under the Coastal brand name. Coastal joined Chevron Corporation and Mobil Oil Corp. in a $200 million deal to purchase crude oil from Iraq. The agreement was part of the United Nations' oil-for-food deal, in which the proceeds of the sales would be used to purchase food and medicine for Iraqi citizens who had suffered significantly from economic sanctions in place against Saddam Hussein since 1991. Coastal also expanded its chemical operations with a newly established ammonia plant in Oyster Creek, Texas. In its coal division Coastal progressed with plans to transform the business from a processing and marketing company to one that mined, processed, and marketed its own coal.

=== 2000s: Acquisition, divestment, and litigation ===
Coastal's operating revenues dropped considerably between 1996 and 1998, from $12.17 billion to $7.37 billion, making it a target for acquisition. Although the company rebounded from increased production of natural gas by more than 16 percent in 1998, coupled with rising oil prices that made Coastal's Petroleum business increasingly profitable, the board of directors and founder Oscar Wyatt continued with merger negotiations. This resulted in Coastal being acquired by the smaller El Paso Energy, whose primary business was in natural gas.

El Paso Corporation acquired Coastal in 2001, and El Paso largely divested itself of Coastal's Petroleum business with the Coastal brand being phased out. Its website was shut down immediately upon the buyout. El Paso has gradually sold off the Coastal retail gasoline business, and very few of its stations still exist under the Coastal brand as of 2008, many having been converted to other major brands or generic brands. Sunoco acquired 245 service stations from Coastal on February 9, 2001, for approximately $40 million. Coastal's Eagle Point, New Jersey Refinery was sold to Sunoco while refineries in Texas and Aruba were acquired by Valero Energy. The majority of the Coastal retail gas stations were sold to Phillips 66 which later became Conoco Phillips.

==== Lawsuit and proxy fight against El Paso ====
In 2003, Oscar Wyatt and other shareholders sued the El Paso Corporation for allegedly misrepresenting its intentions for Coastal assets prior to the merger in 2000. After the merger of Coastal and El Paso Corporation, the latter began divesting itself of Coastal assets beginning in 2001. El Paso needed the cash to repay the mounting debt it had acquired from following the same business model as Ken Lay's Enron. El Paso had heavily leveraged itself to fuel sales into new markets for electricity, and concealed mounting debt from its balance sheet by writing off the debt to offshore subsidiary companies. In June 2003 Oscar Wyatt, along with El Paso investor Selim Zilkha, initiated a proxy fight to gain control of the El Paso Corporation and to wrestle control of the remaining assets, which included natural gas pipelines, exploration, and production assets. Since the merging and disclosing of corporate malfeasance by El Paso management, Its stock had fallen 87% from its February 2001 high of $75 a share. El Paso had debts of $25 billion and was being sued by shareholders and investigated by state and federal regulators.

== See also ==
- William Greehey
