= Oscar Wyatt =

American businessman (1924–2025)

- Born: Oscar Sherman Wyatt Jr. July 11, 1924; Beaumont, Texas, U.S.
- Died: October 8, 2025 (aged 101); Houston, Texas, U.S.
- Education: Texas A&M University, 1949 degree in mechanical engineering
- Occupation: Businessman
- Known for: Founder of Coastal Corporation
- Spouse: Lynn Sakowitz (m. 1963)
- Children: 4
- Website: www.oscarswyatt.com/index.htm (archived)

Oscar Sherman Wyatt Jr. (July 11, 1924 – October 8, 2025) was an American businessman and self made millionaire. He was the founder of Coastal Corporation and a decorated bomber pilot in World War II. In 2007 the U.S. federal court in Manhattan tried him for illegally sending payments to Iraq under the Oil-for-Food Program.

== Early history ==
In 1924 Oscar Wyatt was born into poverty in Beaumont, Texas. He was left by an alcoholic father and raised by a single mother in Navasota, Texas.

At age 16 he began earning money by flying planes, working as a crop duster for a nearby farm. A strong student, Wyatt was accepted to attend Texas A&M University but, in the midst of World War II, he left after a year of school in 1942 to enlist in the United States Army Air Forces as a pilot. Serving as a combat aviator in the South Pacific, Wyatt was wounded twice during battle and was decorated by age 21. After the war, he worked as a farmer to pay his way through Texas A&M and earn a degree in Mechanical Engineering. Out of college, he sold drill bits to small oil companies from the trunk of his Ford Coupe, and worked for Kerr-McGee and Reed Roller Bits before becoming a partner in Wymore Oil Company.

In 1955, he took an $800 loan on his car and used it to found Coastal.

== Texas oilman ==
Known as a shrewd businessman, Wyatt was both beloved and hated, litigious and charitable. A personal friend of Iraq's Saddam Hussein and business partner to Libya's Muammar Qaddafi, Wyatt urged President George H. W. Bush not to go to war with Iraq over Kuwait and later negotiated with Saddam to secure the release of western hostages being held in Baghdad. Wyatt entered the refining industry in the early 1960s, and he began to attend Organization of Petroleum Exporting Countries (OPEC) meetings in Vienna, Austria. The U.S. refineries were optimized for high sulfur ("sour") crude oil, so Wyatt began to buy Iraqi oil in 1972. Wyatt retired as the Coastal Corporation's chairman in 1997 yet continued to serve as Executive Committee chairman until Coastal's sale to the El Paso Natural Gas Company in January 2001.

== The Coastal Corporation ==
Wyatt founded Coastal States Gas Producing Company in 1955. Coastal began business in modest circumstances, with 68 miles of pipeline and 78 employees. He produced gas, and collected it from other smaller producers to sell at a better rate to larger pipeline companies.

Expanding through acquisitions and across multiple sectors, Coastal became a diversified energy company. Coastal produced and marketed petroleum, natural gas, electricity, and coal. It also sold gasoline at Coastal-branded gas stations: by 1999, Coastal Refining and Marketing operated 962 gas stations across in 33 states and was supplied by four refineries, including a 150,000 bbl per day refinery in Corpus Christi, Texas, a 180,000 bbl per day refinery in Eagle Point, New Jersey, a 250,000 barrel per day refinery on Aruba, and a 25,000 bbl per day refinery geared for asphalt production in Chickasaw, Alabama. Coastal Corporation also owned and operated a fleet of oil tankers, tugs, and barges. Sales in 1991 totaled $9.549 billion. Coastal Corporation was a major supplier of marine diesel in the Caribbean, natural gas in Colorado, and heating oil in the Northeast. Coastal was a key natural gas producer and distributor along with competitors Enron, Williams, and El Paso Energy, the last of which Coastal later merged with. Coastal produced, gathered, processed, transported, stored, and marketed natural gas throughout the United States and by the 1990s Coastal's 20,000-mile pipeline network, including the Iroquois and Great Lakes pipeline, completed in 1991, and the Empire State Pipeline, completed in 1992, transported five billion cubic feet of natural gas daily. As of 1999, Coastal was a Fortune 500 company with 13,300 employees and annual Revenues of $8.2 billion.

=== Proxy fight ===
In 2003, Wyatt and other shareholders sued the El Paso Corporation for allegedly misrepresenting its intentions for Coastal assets prior to the merger in 2000. After the merger of Coastal and El Paso Corporation, the latter began divesting itself of Coastal assets beginning in 2001. El Paso needed the cash to repay the mounting debt it had acquired from following the same business model as Ken Lay's Enron. El Paso had heavily leveraged itself to fuel sales into new markets for electricity, and concealed mounting debt from its balance sheet by writing off the debt to offshore subsidiary companies. In June 2003 Wyatt, along with El Paso investor Selim Zilkha, initiated a proxy fight to gain control of the El Paso Corporation and to wrestle control of the remaining assets, which included natural gas pipelines, exploration, and production assets. Since the merging and disclosing of corporate malfeasance by El Paso management, its stock had fallen 87% from its February 2001 high of $75 a share. El Paso had debts of $25 billion and was being sued by shareholders and investigated by state and federal regulators.

== Iraq ==
While El Paso Energy was selling Coastal's petroleum marketing and production assets off piece by piece to competitors Valero, Sunoco, and ConocoPhillips, Wyatt was being investigated for illegally doing business with Iraq in violation of sanctions imposed by the United Nations that strictly regulated Iraqi sales of crude oil. In 2007 Wyatt pleaded guilty in a U.S. federal court for illegally sending payments to Iraq under the Oil-for-Food Program. At his sentencing hearing, Wyatt's attorney, Gerald Shargel, pointed to a commission report led by former Federal Reserve Board Chairman Paul Volcker that concluded that about half of the 4,500 companies in the Oil-for-Food Program paid a total of $1.8 billion in kickbacks and illicit surcharges to Saddam's regime. Wyatt's defense also floated the issue of "vindictive prosecution"—that is, the Bush administration singling out its old nemesis in both the oil patch and politics for punishment while leaving other possible violators of the sanctions alone. Prosecutors, in turn, amassed a daunting paper trail and rewarded a few former Iraqi petrocrats with help in obtaining U.S. green cards—as long as they agreed to testify against sanction breakers like Wyatt. In October 2007 Wyatt pleaded guilty to conspiring to, under the Oil-for-Food Program, make illegal payments to Saddam Hussein's Iraq. Wyatt received a one-year prison sentence, and was sentenced to serve in the minimum security camp at the Federal Correctional Complex, Beaumont, in Beaumont, Texas.

== Comeback and later life ==
After stepping down from Coastal, Wyatt continued to consult with other petroleum related interests to help them improve their processes and procedures, and maximize their pipeline and refinery operations, resulting in better returns for common shareholders. Wyatt invested in frozen foods distribution and, in July 2001, created a new company - the NuCoastal Corporation, renamed Coastal Energy - to explore energy opportunities available across the globe, including Malaysia, and sold Coastal Energy for $500 million in 2013. Wyatt turned 100 in 2024, and died in Houston on October 8, 2025, at the age of 101.

== Sources ==
- Coastal Energy
- Texas Monthly 2001
- Forbes
- Texas Monthly 2007
