= Clark Brands =

American oil company

Clark Brands, LLC
- Type: Public
- Industry: Oil & Gas
- Founded: 1932
- Headquarters: Lisle, Illinois, United States
- Website: www.clarkbrands.com

Original Logo used through 1992

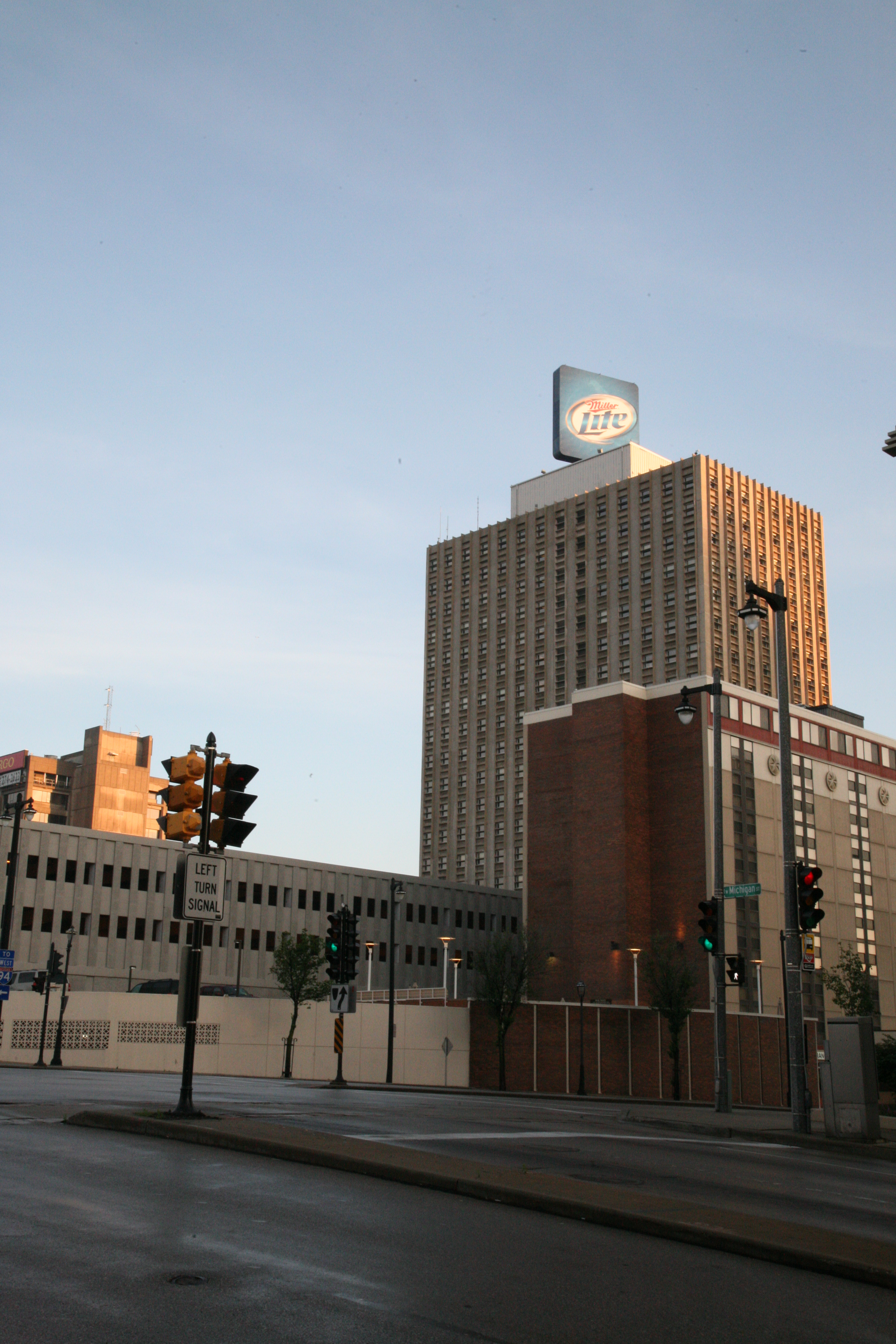
Former Clark Building (with Miller Lite sign), originally the headquarters for the Clark Oil and Refining Company.

Clark Brands is an oil company headquartered in Milwaukee, Wisconsin.

== History ==
Founded by Emory T. Clark in 1932 as a single filling station on the corner of 60th St. and Greenfield Ave. in West Allis, Wisconsin, Clark Super Gas sold only premium gasoline. Unlike most contemporary service stations, Clark stations did not offer mechanical maintenance and tire changing.

In 1943, the company moved into refining oil. By the mid-1950s, the company operated nearly 500 gas stations throughout the Midwest, with locations in California, Florida, Illinois, Indiana, Iowa, Michigan, Minnesota, Missouri, Ohio and Wisconsin.

From 1948 to 1950, Clark Super Gas sponsored the Milwaukee Clarks, a minor league ice hockey team in the International Hockey League.

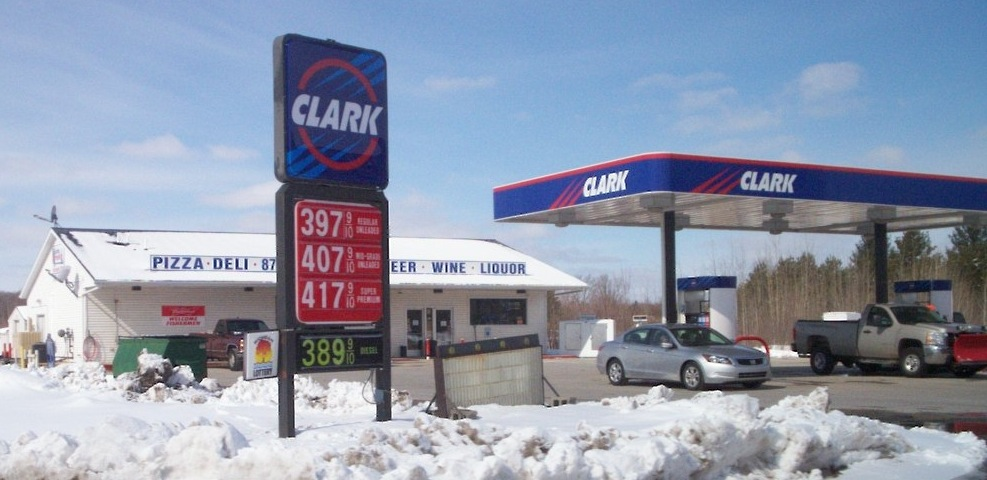
Clark station in Prescott, Michigan, formerly Citgo

At its height in the 1970s, Clark Oil was the largest independent oil refiner and marketer in the Midwest with 1,489 stations and two refineries, one in Blue Island, Illinois and the other in Hartford, Illinois. The average Clark station sold twice the number of gallons as the national average, and its emphasis on premium gasoline gave the company a high profit margin.

Emory Clark sold his interest in the company in 1981 to Apex Oil, a St. Louis, Missouri–based company. In 1985, Apex decided to sell Clark Oil. By 1987, Clark and Apex were bankrupt.

In 1992, a division of Toronto-based Horsham Corp. bought Clark Oil and Refining, which included the two refineries and around 1,000 gas stations. The company's name was changed to Clark Refining and Marketing. Horsham expanded the company, buying a Lima, Ohio refinery from BP, and a Port Arthur, Texas refinery from Chevron. Horsham became TrizecHahn, and then sold 80% of Clark to The Blackstone Group, another investment firm, and another portion to Occidental Petroleum.

In 1999, the company sold its retail unit and rebranded itself as Premcor. In 2001, many Clark stations in southeast Michigan were closed permanently. In 2003, Clark Brands, LLC was formed and purchased the Clark brand from bankrupt Clark Retail, as well as other portions of the Clark business, with a primary goal to license the Clark brand to independent operators. Clark gas stations are now operating throughout 32 states, with over 1000-branded locations, some with convenience stores under the On the Go name.

In 2013 Clark Brands acquired the brand licensing business of Crown Central Petroleum.
