= PBF Energy =

Energy Corporation

PBF Energy Inc.
- Type: Public company
- Traded as: NYSE: PBF (Class A); S&P 400 component; Russell 2000 component
- Industry: Downstream (petroleum industry)
- Founded: 2008
- Headquarters: Parsippany, New Jersey, U.S.
- Key people: Thomas J. Nimbley; (Chairman); Matthew C. Lucey; (President & CEO)
- Revenue: ▼US$29.3 billion (2025)
- Operating income: ▲ −US$54.3 million (2025)
- Net income: ▲ −US$158 million (2025)
- Number of employees: 3,776 (2024)
- Website: pbfenergy.com

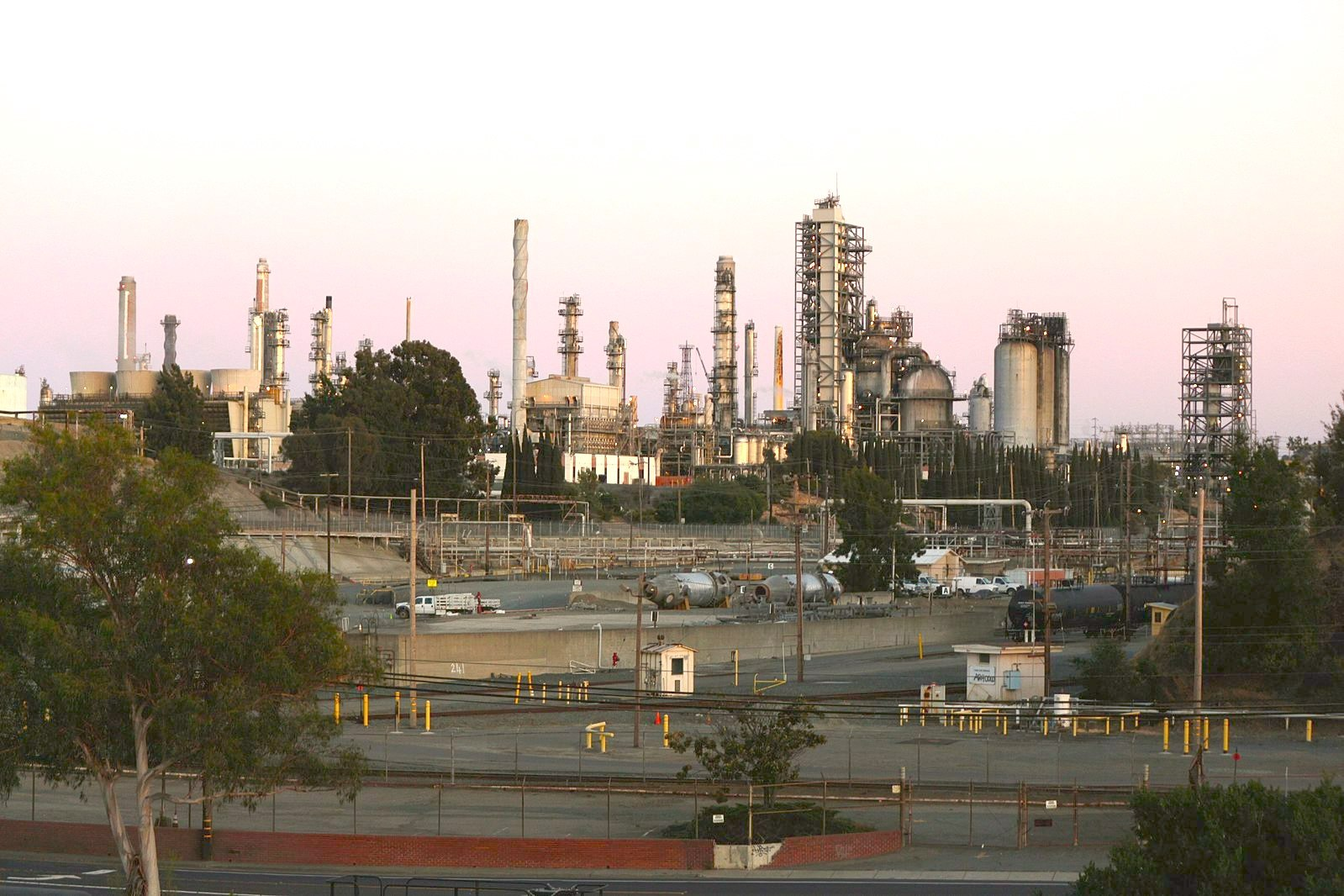
The Martinez Refinery, owned by PBF Energy, located in Martinez, CA

PBF Energy Inc. is a petroleum refining and logistics company that produces and sells transportation fuels, heating oils, lubricants, petrochemical feedstocks, and other petroleum products. The company owns and operated 6 refineries throughout the United States, located in Chalmette, Louisiana; Toledo, Ohio; Paulsboro, New Jersey; the Delaware City Refinery in Delaware City; Torrance, California; Martinez, California. PBF produces a range of products including gasoline, ultra-low-sulfur diesel (ULSD), heating oil, jet fuel, lubricants, petrochemicals and asphalt.

In February 2020, with the acquisition of the Martinez Refinery, PBF Energy currently owns and operates six domestic oil refineries and related assets with a combined processing capacity, known as throughput, of approximately 1,000,000 bpd, and a weighted average Nelson Complexity Index of 13.2.

On November 30, 2022, PBF Energy acquired of the common units representing limited partner interests in PBF Logistics.

== History and acquisitions ==
PBF was formed in 2008 as a joint venture by Petroplus Holdings and the private equity companies Blackstone Group and First Reserve (the PBF in PBF Energy stands for Petroplus, Blackstone, and First Reserve), each committing $667 million in equity. In September 2010, Petroplus announced plans to sell its 32.62 percent stake to its partners for $91 million as PBF acquired the Paulsboro refinery from Valero Energy. PBF then acquired the Toledo refinery from Sunoco in December 2010 for approximately $400 million. PBF went public in December 2012 with a $533 million initial public offering.

In 2015 PBF acquired the 189,000 BPD Chalmette, Louisiana refinery from ExxonMobil and its partner, the state-owned Petroleos de Venezuela, for $322 million, in a deal that included interests in chemical facilities, pipelines and other assets at the site located just ten minutes from downtown New Orleans.

In July 2016, PBF acquired the 155,000 BPD ExxonMobil refinery in Torrance, California for $537.5M. The acquisition included ownership interests in several crude gathering and transportation pipelines, product pipelines, products terminals and crude and products storage facilities, and increased PBF's total throughput capacity to approximately 900,000 barrels per day, making it the fourth largest independent refiner in North America.

PBF's refineries in Paulsboro (NJ) and Delaware City (DE) have been cited by environmentalists for processing crude oil from the Amazon River Basin in South America. In 2015, the Delaware City and Paulsboro refineries were processing more than 3,300 and 2,666 barrels per day of crude originating in the Amazon, respectively. The company had 3,165 employees as of 2017 with annual revenue of $21,787 million.

In June 2019, PBF agreed to purchase Shell's Martinez, California oil refinery. The sale was finalized on February 1, 2020.

== Refineries ==
As of October 2023, PBF owns and operates six oil refineries, with a combined processing capacity (known as throughput) of approximately 1,000,000 bpd and a weighted average Nelson Complexity Index of 13.2.

Refinery Name	Throughput Capacity (bpd)	Crude Processed	Source	Nelson complexity index
Delaware City Refinery	180,000	light sweet through heavy sour	water, rail	13.6
Paulsboro Refinery	155,000	light sweet through heavy sour	water	8.8
Toledo Refinery	180,000	light sweet	pipeline, truck, rail	11.0
Chalmette Refinery	185,000	light sweet through heavy sour	water, pipeline	13.0
Torrance Refinery	166,000	medium and heavy	water, pipeline, truck	13.8
Martinez Refinery	157,000	medium and heavy	water, pipeline	16.1
