= Nustar Fire =

2019 fire in California, United States

- Part of the 2019 California wildfires
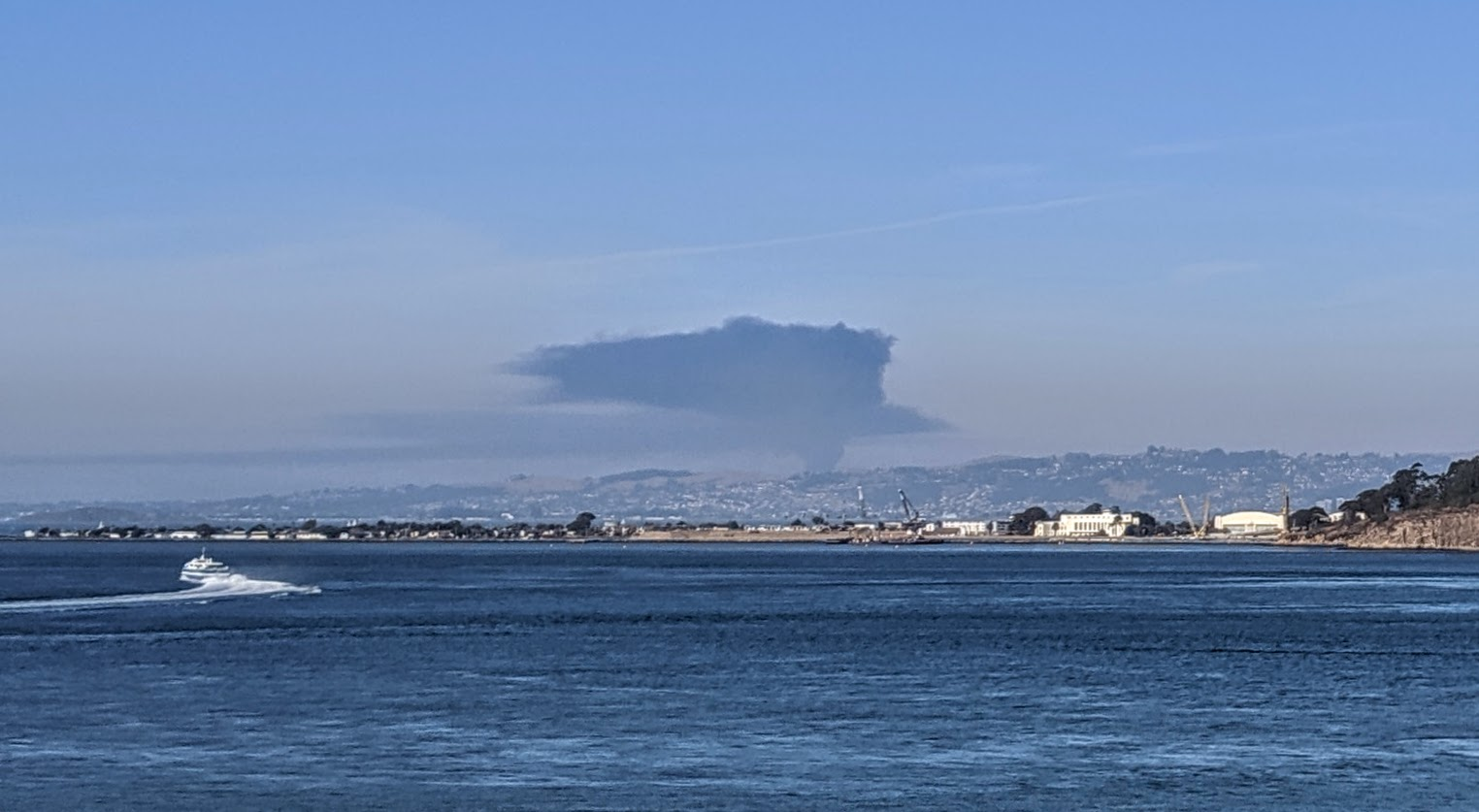
- Nustar Fire smoke plume as seen from San Francisco, looking across Treasure Island toward Crockett
- Date: October 15, 2019 – October 16, 2019
- Location: Contra Costa County, California
- Coordinates: 38.0458°N 122.2451°W

Statistics
- Burned area: 15 acres (6 ha)

Impacts
- Structures destroyed: 2 destroyed

Ignition
- Cause: Unknown

Map
- Location in Northern California

The Nustar Fire was a fuel storage fire and wildfire at the NuStar Energy facility in Crockett, California, which started about 2:00 PM on 15 October 2019. By 9:00 PM the same evening, the fire was contained, though two tanks of ethanol were still burning. About 15 acres burned.

The ATF and other agencies investigated the cause of the fuel tank explosions. There is some speculation that the event might have been related to a nearby earthquake 15 hours earlier.

On 22 October it was reported that the Nustar Fire was provoking opposition to an expansion of the Phillips 66 refinery tank farm adjacent to the NuStar facility, in Rodeo.

As of 25 October 2019 (10 days after the fire), two ships delivering imported ethanol were stuck without a place to unload, since the NuStar terminal was the only terminal in the San Francisco area set up to receive ethanol, and was shut down by the state while they investigated the fire.

On 27 October, another fire, the Sky Fire, threatened Crockett, burning another 150 acres along Cummings Skyway. Most of the town and the NuStar facility were evacuated. The Sky Fire was extinguished on 28 October.

According to the 30-day interim report on the Nustar fire submitted to the Contra Costa Hazardous Materials Programs by Shore Terminals LLC:

The updated material released quantity estimate during the October 15, 2019 fire incident is approximately 6,664 total barrels of ethanol from the impacted tanks and approximately 3,846 barrels of renewable diesel and 43 barrels of jet fuel from the impacted piping.

As previously reported, the cause of the incident is unknown and is under investigation by Contra Costa County Fire Protection District with support from several agencies, including yours. David LeCount has been at the site much of the time participating. Shore Terminals LLC submits this as an interim report and will update this report monthly until the investigation is complete and a final report can be submitted in accordance with the Contra Costa County Hazardous Materials Incident Notification Policy.

A final report from the Contra Costa County Fire Protection District was completed and presented May 21, 2021. It concluded the first tank explosion was probably caused by an electric fault that ignited an ethanol vapor air mixture in the headspace of the tank. Improper grounding was observed as well as a pallet removed from the vapor line PRV after a 2012 incident. The second tank was damaged by debris from the first explosion.
