= William Greehey =

American businessman and philanthropist (born 1936)

William E. Greehey
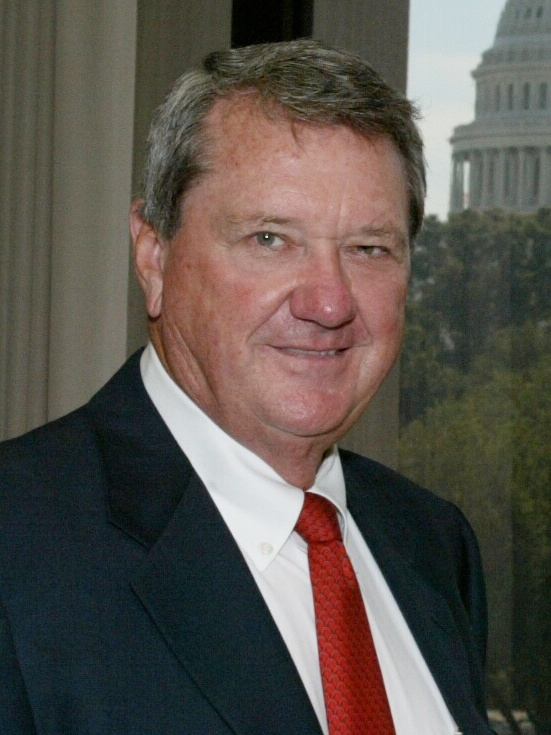
- Bill Greehey in 2003
- Born: William Eugene Greehey; June 9, 1936 (age 90); Fort Dodge, Iowa, US
- Education: St. Mary's University (BA)
- Occupations: Businessman & Philanthropist
- Title: CEO Valero Energy; 1980 to January 1, 2006; Chairman Valero Energy; 1980 to January 17, 2007; Chairman NuStar Energy
- Board member of: Haven For Hope Valero Energy NuStar Energy Valero Alamo Bowl Valero Texas Open
- Children: 5

William Eugene "Bill" Greehey (born June 9, 1936, in Fort Dodge, Iowa) is an American businessman and philanthropist. He is most known for his roles as the founding CEO and Chairman of Valero Energy Corporation and NuStar Energy.

== Early life ==
Bill Greehey was born in Fort Dodge, Iowa, and graduated from Fort Dodge Senior High School in 1954. He then served with the US Air Force for four years and was based at Lackland AFB, in San Antonio, Texas. Following his Air Force career, he used his GI Bill benefits to enroll in St. Mary's University at San Antonio, and later received a Bachelor's degree in Accounting.

== Career ==
After graduation in 1960, he started working as a CPA for Price Waterhouse and later became an auditor for Exxon. In 1963, he joined Coastal States Gas Corporation. By 1968 at the age of 32, he held the post of a senior vice president. In 1973, he was President and CEO of Coastal Corporation's subsidiary LoVaca Gathering Company which on December 31, 1979, became the Valero Energy Corporation. He was the founding CEO and Chairman of the Valero Energy Corporation and Group and held those posts until January 2006 and January 2007, respectively. In 2006, he was the founding Chairman of NuStar Energy L.P. and Group. As a philanthropist, he founded the William Greehey Family Foundation in April 2003.

In March 2020 as the COVID-19 pandemic was spreading, his Greehey Foundation pledged financial support for those in need of relief.

== Personal life ==
Greehey has been married to Louree née Bruce Greehey for over sixty years and they have five children. Along with his five children, he has 14 grandchildren and six great-grandchildren, all of whom he shares with his wife Louree. Bill, and Louree are Republicans and are closely associated with the Nustar PAC. He serves on the Board of Trustees of St. Mary’s University in San Antonio, which named him a Distinguished Alumnus in 1986 and granted him an honorary doctorate of philosophy in 1998. At St. Mary's University, the Bill Greehey Arena and the Greehey School of Business were named in his honor in 2000 and 2005, respectively. The Bill Greehey Refineries in Corpus Christi is named in his honor.

== Awards ==
In 1998, Mr. Greehey was presented with the Outstanding Philanthropist Award from the San Antonio Chapter of the National Society of Fund Raising Executives; and he was inducted into the San Antonio Business Hall of Fame by Junior Achievement.

In 2000, Greehey received the American Academy of Achievement’s Golden Plate Award.

In 2001, Greehey received the distinguished Horatio Alger Award.
