= James Rosemond =

American entertainment industry executive and convicted drug trafficker

Jimmy Henchman
- Born: February 5, 1965 (age 61); Manhattan, New York City, U.S.
- Other name: Jimmy Henchman
- Occupation: Music manager
- Years active: 1986–2015
- Spouse: 2
- Children: 1
- Status: Incarcerated
- Criminal charges: Drug trafficking, obstruction of justice and possessing and using firearms, conspiracy to commit murder
- Penalty: Life imprisonment

James Rosemond (born February 5, 1965), often known as or sometimes Jimmy Henchmen, is an American former music manager and convicted criminal.

== Early life ==
Rosemond was born in 1965, in Harlem, New York and grew up in Flatbush, Brooklyn, New York, in an apartment complex called Vanderveer Gardens. His parents migrated from Haiti in the 1960s. They divorced when he was young, leaving his mother to raise five children alone.

== Entertainment career ==
Rosemond and several friends founded the music conference "How Can I Be Down" in 1992. Rosemond was behind Salt-n-Pepa's 1993 single "Shoop"

Circa 1996, Rosemond founded Henchmen, the company that would later become the rap management company Czar Entertainment. He was the CEO of Czar, when it managed Sean Kingston, Brandy, Gucci Mane, Guerilla Black, Salt-n-Pepa and Akon. The company's flagship artist was rapper The Game. He was a known figure in the hip hop music industry, described in a 2012 The New York Times article as "a prince at the royal court, whose ties to rap music’s biggest stars were known far and wide." Rosemond was The Game's manager during a feud with 50 Cent when The Game recorded the diss track "300 Bars and Runnin." In 2006, Henchman and 50 Cent (Curtis Jackson) settled a lawsuit regarding a DVD that Czar Entertainment released about 50 Cent's namesake, Kelvin "50 Cent" Martin, in which interviews with Jackson were alleged to have been inappropriately used. In the settlement, a charity was created with funds going to support Martin and his children.

In 2002, Rosemond negotiated the Lennox Lewis vs. Mike Tyson boxing match. It was the first time that a boxer demanded that after a million buys on pay-per-view, the boxers would split the purse 50–50 with Showtime Networks/HBO.

In 2003, Rosemond, along with Chris Lighty, joined Russell Simmons in his campaign to end New York's Rockefeller Drug Laws.

Rosemond along with Shakim Compere and Mona Scott, executive produced BET's SOS Saving Ourselves: Help for Haiti, a telethon held at Miami's American Airlines Arena on February 5, 2010, to raise money for the devastated victims of the 2010 Haiti earthquake that killed over 100,000 people.

== Criminal charges and conviction ==
=== Drug trafficking, money laundering and witness tampering convictions ===
In June 2010, Rosemond was arrested on charges of cocaine trafficking, money laundering, and witness tampering. He went on trial in May 2012, represented by Gerald Shargel.

On June 5, 2012, Rosemond was convicted in Federal District Court in Brooklyn of drug trafficking, obstruction of justice, firearms violations, and other financial crimes associated with his position as head of a multi-million-dollar transnational cocaine-selling organization. At trial, it was alleged that Rosemond led the large scale, bi-coastal narcotics-trafficking organization that transported cocaine from Los Angeles, California to the New York metropolitan area. The group, known as the "Rosemond Organization," in turn shipped cash proceeds from the narcotics sales back to Los Angeles using a variety of methods as part of its operation. Millions of dollars in cash and narcotics were sent through FedEx and United Parcel Service, often covered in mustard to avoid discovery by detection dogs. In the indictment, prosecutors noted that Rosemond made over $11 million a year since 2007 through his drug trafficking scheme.

On October 25, 2013, Rosemond was sentenced to life imprisonment. As part of his sentence, Rosemond forfeited approximately $14 million in cash and property. United States Attorney for the Eastern District of New York Loretta E. Lynch said that Rosemond's carefully crafted image as a music mogul was in reality "a cover for the real Jimmy Rosemond - a thug in a suit." Presiding Judge John Gleeson remarked that he would have sentenced Rosemond to life even if it were not legally required as his crimes were "astonishing in their breadth, duration and intensity."

On March 10, 2016, Rosemond filed a habeas corpus appeal with the same federal court seeking a new trial along with a complaint to the U.S. Justice Department Office of Professional Responsibility against former U.S. Attorney Todd Kaminsky citing actions taken with regard to securing testimony from the government's lead witness Henry "Black" Butler. In 2019, the court denied the writ and dismissed his appeal.

=== Murder for hire ===
In June 2012, Rosemond was charged with four crimes in connection with the death of G-Unit affiliate Lowell "Lodi Mack" Fletcher, including murder-for-hire and conspiracy to commit murder. Rosemond is alleged to have arranged the murder as payback for the alleged assault on his son by Lodi Mack and Tony Yayo. The trial began on February 10, 2014 in a New York federal court. More than 35 witnesses testified at the trial. Closing arguments finished on March 4, 2014. The jury deliberations resulted in a hung jury on the four counts for both Rosemond and co-defendant Johnson.

Rosemond came before a jury again in December 2014 and on December 11 the jury found him guilty on all charges for the murder of Lowell "Lodi Mack" Fletcher. On March 23, 2015, Rosemond was sentenced to life in prison plus 20 years by Judge Colleen McMahon. The U.S. Court of Appeals for the 2nd circuit overturned the conviction in 2016. The case was tried for the third time in 2017. Rosemond was again convicted and sentenced to life plus 30 years. Rosemond was assigned BOP#17903-054 and is incarcerated at USP Pollock.

== Personal life ==
Rosemond has a son and two daughters.

== Cultural influence ==
Rosemond is profiled by filmmaker Don Sikorski in the documentary video series Unjust Justice: The Jimmy Rosemond Tapes released in 2016 and podcast Unjust Justice: The Jimmy Rosemond Story released in 2020 and hosted by Michael K. Williams. The series examined Rosemond's life, criminal cases, and portrayal by the media.

Rosemond was mentioned by name (as "Henchman") by Tupac Shakur in his song "Against All Odds" on his album The Don Killuminati: The 7 Day Theory, on which Shakur raps "promise to payback Jimmy Henchman in due time." Tupac believed that Rosemond was involved in setting up the shooting and robbery of Shakur at the Quad Recording Studios in New York in November 1994. In 2012, a man named Dexter Isaac, serving a life sentence for unrelated crimes, claimed that he attacked Shakur that night and that the robbery was indeed orchestrated by Rosemond.

American rapper Rick Ross acknowledges Rosemond as a mentor in his song "Ghostwriter" from the album Black Market: "Remember receiving words of wisdom from Jimmy Henchman I lit a blunt in his honor when he received his sentence."

== Further listening ==
Rosemond, James (March 21, 2022). Unjust Justice: The James Rosemond Story. Apple Podcasts Preview. Interviewed by Michael K. Williams; Don Sikorski.
