= Lynn Wyatt =

American socialite (born 1935)

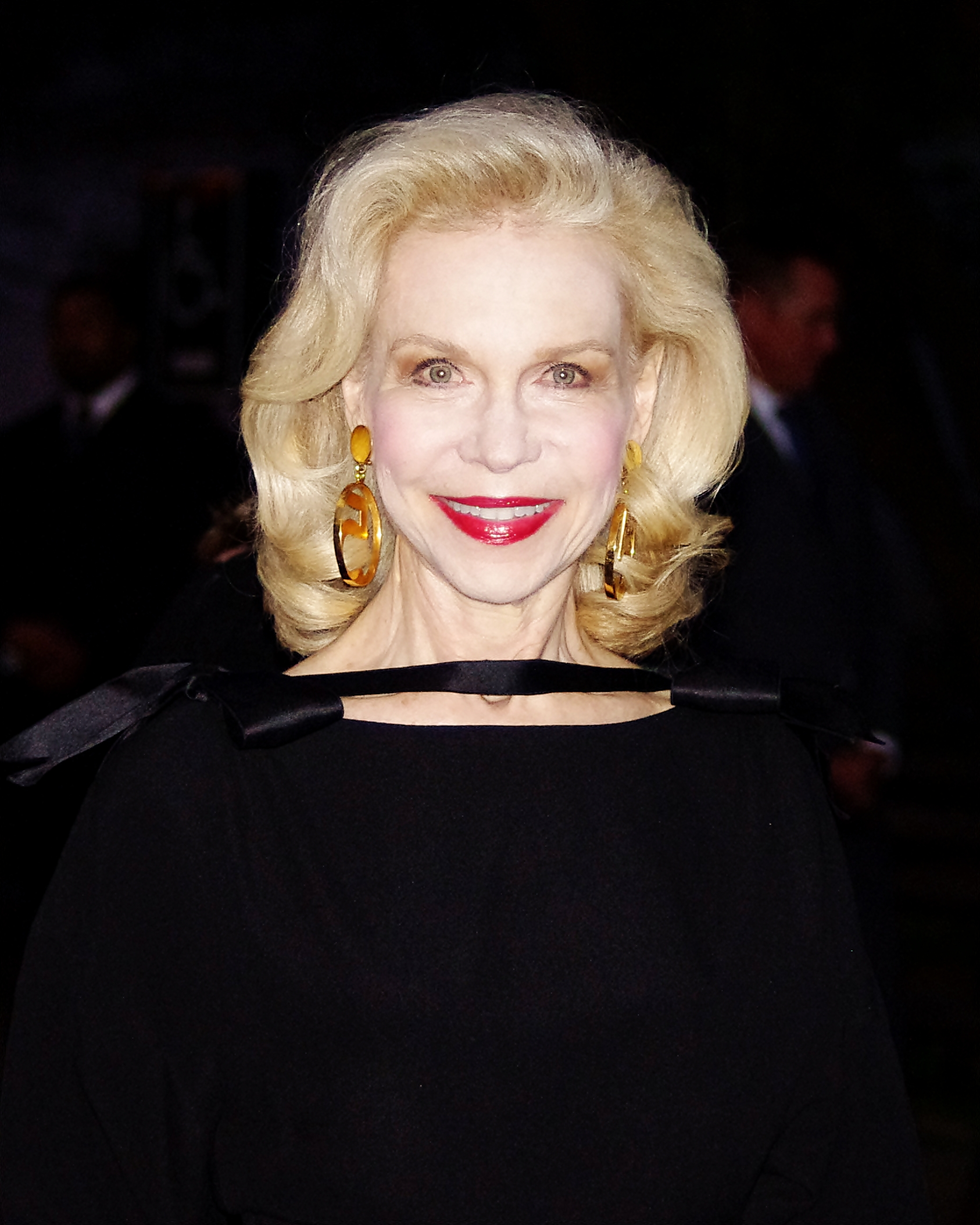
- Wyatt at a Vanity Fair party for the 2012 Tribeca Film Festival
- Born: Lynn Sakowitz; July 16, 1935 (age 91); Houston, Texas, U.S.
- Education: University of Texas at Austin (studies not finished)
- Years active: 1963–present
- Spouse: Oscar Wyatt (m. 1963; died 2025)
- Children: 4

Lynn Wyatt (née Sakowitz; born July 16, 1935) is a Houston socialite, philanthropist, and third-generation Texan. Her grandfather and great-uncle started the Sakowitz Department Store chain. Her husband, Oscar Wyatt, was an energy executive, the founder of Houston's Coastal Corporation—now owned by El Paso Corporation —and CEO of NuCoastal LLC. Lynn and Oscar Wyatt have four sons.

During the height of the oil boom in the 1970s/early 1980s, the family mansion in Houston was known as the "Wyatt Hyatt" becoming a "home away from home" for people including Princess Margaret, Princess Grace of Monaco, Bill Blass, Joan Collins, Mick Jagger, and King Hussein and Queen Noor of Jordan.

== Personal life ==
Wyatt is the daughter of Ann Baum Sakowitz (July 28, 1913 – January 18, 2010, San Antonio) and Bernard Sakowitz (1907–1981), a prominent couple in Houston's Jewish circles. They were married in July 1933. Ann was once in negotiations with Louis B. Meyer for a movie acting contract, but abandoned it on Bernard's objection. They also had a son, Robert T. Sakowitz (born c. 1939), known as the merchant prince of Houston. The Sakowitz family owned the Sakowitz fashion specialty stores. Oscar Wyatt and Robert Sakowitz did not get along.

Lynn Sakowitz has been married twice. Her first husband was Robert Lipman and they had two sons together. Lipman was convicted of killing a woman during a drug overdose and served six years in prison for manslaughter. In 1963, Lynn Sakowitz Lipman married oil magnate Oscar Wyatt. She became his fourth wife, and he adopted both her sons from her previous marriage, giving them his name. The elder of them, Steve Wyatt, would become famous for his friendship with the British royal family, particularly Sarah, Duchess of York. Lynn and Oscar Wyatt raised four sons together, Steven Bradford Wyatt, Douglas Bryan Wyatt (born c. 1957), Oscar Sherman "Trey" Wyatt III, and Bradford Allington Wyatt.

== Sakowitz stores ==
Ukrainian Jewish immigrants Tobias Sakowitz and brother Simon founded Sakowitz Bros. specialty department store in 1902, in Galveston, Texas. The business thrived and expanded in the first half of the twentieth century. Their first Houston store started in 1908. The Sakowitz brothers became leaders in Houston's Jewish community, chairing the building campaign of Congregation Beth Israel, in 1922 and 1923. Both later served terms as president of the congregation.

In the early 1950s, Tobias was still at the helm, and opened a number of major stores, including a 254,000 square foot, Alfred Charles Flynn-designed flagship store at the northeast corner of Main and Dallas Streets in downtown Houston. More than a dozen other stores followed: full-line and junior department stores, as well as luxury boutiques, in Texas (Dallas, Amarillo, Midland), and further afield in the Tulsa, Phoenix and Cincinnati areas.

In 1957, Tobias' son Bernard took over the chain. Eighteen years later, Bernard's son Robert took over, Lynn and Robert nominally ran the business together upon the death of their father in 1981, but Lynn claimed to be a mostly passive partner.

Robert's reign was short-lived. In 1985, the company filed for bankruptcy protection. It took on an Australian construction company, L.J. Hooker as a partner. After the 1987 stock market crash, sales plummeted at the stores, and an Australian interest rate jump pushed Hooker into bankruptcy, too. Sakowitz, Inc. closed in 1990.

In 1991, a family rift between the Wyatts and Sakowitzes over its disposition went to court. Lynn's children claimed Robert had pilfered the company assets, driving it out of business, but Robert countered that Lynn had been part of the business investment approval process. Their mother, Ann, sided with Robert, and was forced to give up a stipend provided by the business due to the lawsuit. The Sakowitzes won the suit, but a judge set it aside. After a federal injunction blocking the retrial, the families settled out of court.

Robert Sakowitz continued as a business magnate, starting consultants Hazak Corp., in 1991, specializing in business strategies and marketing. He is the CEO In 1998, the downtown location was sold, and turned into The Main Garage, a 490-space parking garage.
