= Emory T. Clark =

American businessman

Emory T. Clark (September 17, 1905 – February 27, 1984) was an American businessman.

== Biography ==
Emory Clark was born on September 17, 1905, in Waycross, Georgia. In the 1920s, he moved to Gary, Indiana, and later Chicago, Illinois, with his widowed mother and four brothers to work in construction. During the Great Depression in the United States, however, he was unable to find work.

In 1932, he moved to Milwaukee and opened a filling station in West Allis, Wisconsin, paving the way for the creation of the Clark Oil and Refining Corporation, now known as Clark Brands. He retired in 1974, but resumed management in 1978. By 1979, Clark Oil and Refining Corporation comprised 1,814 stations in ten midwestern states with total sales of over $1 billion. That year, he recruited a successor. He sold his shares in 1981.

In 1983, he appeared on the Forbes 400 list. He founded the Emory T. Clark Family Charitable Foundation in 1982. He lived in Elm Grove, Wisconsin. He had three sons and two daughters.

He died of cancer on February 27, 1984. The Emory T. Clark Hall in the College of Nursing at Marquette University is named for him.
