= Gerald Shargel =

American criminal defense lawyer (1944–2022)

- Born: Gerald Lawrence Shargel; October 5, 1944; New Brunswick, New Jersey, U.S.
- Died: July 16, 2022 (aged 77); New York City, U.S.
- Education: Rutgers University (Class of 1966); Brooklyn Law School (Class of 1969)
- Occupations: Trial attorney (retired 2018), law professor
- Known for: Lead attorney for multiple defendants, including Gambino crime family members John Gotti and Sammy Gravano
- Spouse: Terry Krapes Shargel
- Children: 2

Gerald "Jerry" Lawrence Shargel (October 5, 1944 – July 16, 2022) was an American defense attorney who was based in New York City and generally considered one of the best criminal defense lawyers in the country.

== Early life and education ==
Shargel was born in New Brunswick, New Jersey, to Leo Shargel, a paint-and-wallpaper store proprietor, and Lillian Edenzon Shargel on October 5, 1944. He attended Bound Brook High School and graduated in 1966 from Rutgers University, where his mother worked as one of its math department's secretaries, and in 1969 from Brooklyn Law School, joining the New York bar shortly thereafter.

== Career ==
Shargel was widely regarded as one of the best criminal defense attorneys in New York. A 1998 profile in The New York Times referred to him as "regarded on Centre Street as a brilliant tactician and a very good trial lawyer with a successful white-collar practice". In receiving the Thurgood Marshall Award for Outstanding Criminal Law Practitioner by the New York State Association of Criminal Defense Lawyers in 2006, he was referred to as "one of the most brilliant criminal defense attorneys in America… quite possibly the finest of his generation".

In a 1991 federal case against the Gambino crime family, Shargel was initially slated to represent underboss Sammy Gravano. However, Judge I. Leo Glasser barred Shargel and Bruce Cutler from representing, respectively, Gravano and Gotti, agreeing with prosecutors' assertion that the lawyers were "in-house counsel" to the Gambinos. Prosecutors, including John Gleeson, contended that since Shargel and Cutler may have known about criminal activity, they were "part of the evidence" and liable to be called as witnesses.

Shargel's other high-profile clients included Triad boss Johnny Eng, who was one of New York's biggest heroin traffickers in the late 1980's, Daniel Pelosi, who was charged with and later convicted of the second-degree murder of East Hampton millionaire Ted Ammon, and Robert "Joe" Halderman in the matter of Halderman's extortion of television personality David Letterman. Shargel represented Halderman from October 2009 to March 9, 2010, when Halderman entered a plea-bargained guilty plea.

Shargel was well known for his courtroom style and dramatic presentations, which may have helped some of his clients to be found not guilty. For example, in 2005, Murder Inc. record label owners Irv and Chris Gotti (who are no relation to his aforementioned client John) were acquitted on all charges, possibly partially due to the effect of his courtroom demeanor on the jury—as there were a number of lively exchanges between him and NYPD detective Anthony Castiglia during testimony. In particular, Shargel represented Chris.

In 2012 Shargel defended hip hop mogul James "Jimmy Henchman" Rosemond, CEO of Czar Entertainment, in a federal trial in Brooklyn, New York, presided over by Judge Gleeson. Rosemond was convicted on all charges (including cocaine distribution, conspiracy, money laundering, firearms possession, and witness tampering), and on October 25, 2013, he was sentenced to life imprisonment.

Shargel also taught criminal law classes at his alma mater, Brooklyn Law School, where he held the position of Practitioner-In-Residence, teaching courses on evidence, criminal procedure, and trial advocacy. He was also a frequent writer and commentator on legal issues that arise during high-profile criminal cases, which generate sustained national and regional media focus.

In 2018, he retired from active law practice, citing burnout.

== Personal life ==
Shargel died from complications of Alzheimer's disease at his residence in Manhattan on July 16, 2022, at the age of 77.

Shargel is survived by his two children, David and Johanna, and six grandchildren, Casey, Miles, Tatum, Theo, Eli, and James.

== Notable clients ==
- Amanda Bynes
- Jeffrey Chodorow, restaurateur
- James Coonan
- Gurmeet Singh Dhinsa, who was found guilty
- Marc Dreier, who was sentenced to 20 years in prison
- Johnny "Machinegun Johnny" Eng
- John A. Gotti, John Gotti's son
- John Gotti
- Salvatore "Sammy the Bull" Gravano
- Joe Halderman
- James "Jimmy Henchman" Rosemond
- Christopher "Chris Gotti" Lorenzo, co-founder of Murder Inc. Records who was acquitted of all charges of money laundering and conspiracy to launder money against him
- Daniel Pelosi
- Oscar Wyatt, Texas oilman who pleaded guilty to paying kickbacks to the Hussein administration to gain access to Iraqi oil contracts
- Malcolm Smith, New York State Senator of Queens
