= Montrose Environmental Group =

American multinational environmental company

Montrose Environmental Group, Inc.
- Type: Public
- Traded as: NYSE: MEG (2020–present)
- ISIN: US6151111019
- Founded: 2012; 14 years ago
- Headquarters: Little Rock, Arkansas, U.S.
- Number of locations: 90 offices
- Area served: Worldwide
- Key people: Vijay Manthripragada (President & CEO)
- Revenue: ▲US$624.2 million (2023)
- Net income: ▲US$39.7 million (2023)
- Number of employees: 3,500 (2024)
- Subsidiaries: See list
- Website: montrose-env.com

Montrose Environmental Group, Inc. (commonly shortened to Montrose) is an American multinational corporation that provides wide-ranging environmental services. The company is vertically integrated across the environmental industry and supports public and private sector clientele. Montrose is headquartered in Little Rock, Arkansas and incorporated in the U.S. state of Delaware.

== History ==
Montrose Environmental Group was founded in 2012, received investment from Oaktree Capital Management in 2018, and began trading on the New York Stock Exchange in July 2020.

In 2019, Montrose subsidiary, Enthalpy Analytical, performed PFAS water testing for the town of Maysville in Jones County, North Carolina. The company has performed similar testing for various municipalities and agencies, including Pender County, North Carolina. Enthalpy Analytical was also a contributor to a study titled, "Analysis and differentiation of tobacco-derived and synthetic nicotine products" published in PLOS One.

In 2021, the company moved its corporate headquarters from Irvine, California, to Little Rock, Arkansas. Arkansas Secretary of Commerce Mike Preston welcomed the company and wrote that "Montrose will be a great addition to the Arkansas business community" and Governor Asa Hutchinson wrote "I am confident that Montrose will find the [Arkansas] talent they need to grow and prosper for many years to come."

By 2020, Montrose subsidiary ECT2's water filtration and PFAS removal vessels had been deployed to more than 350 sites around the world and have supported water filtration efforts with various municipalities such as the city of Portsmouth, New Hampshire and the Anson-Madison Sanitary District.

ECT2 has also deployed a patented resin system at the site of Pease Air National Guard Base which has treated tens of millions of gallons of contaminated water.

In June 2022, Montrose was the victim of a "highly sophisticated" ransomware attack that impacted computers and servers within the company's Enthalpy Analytical laboratory network.

In 2023, Montrose representatives were selected to serve on a technical panel to support the development of new, enhanced air monitoring guidance for the State of Colorado Department of Public Health & Environment, Air Pollution Control Division. The company has also been represented at the U.S. Environmental Protection Agency (EPA) National Ambient Air Monitoring Conference.

In the aftermath of the 2023 East Palestine, Ohio, train derailment, railroad company Norfolk Southern hired Montrose subsidiary CTEH to address residents' concerns about health risks, design the testing protocol for the indoor air tests, run a resident hotline regarding fears of odors, fumes or health problems (working closely with the EPA), and publish an Air Sampling and Analysis Plan. The same year, CTEH was contracted by Miami-Dade County to conduct air monitoring after a massive fire at the County Waste-to-Energy Facility.

Montrose has also been contracted by the California Public Utilities Commission to help organizations and companies in the state maintain California Environmental Quality Act (CEQA) compliance. The company has also adopted sustainability goals in alignment with the United Nations Sustainable Development Goals.

As of 2024, Montrose has supported over 13 U.S. federal agency clients, including the Army, Air Force, Navy, Coast Guard, Maritime Administration, EPA, Department of Veterans Affairs, Food and Drug Administration, National Park Service, National Oceanic and Atmospheric Administration, Centers for Disease Control, Bureau of Land Management, National Institutes of Health, and the U.S. Fish and Wildlife Service. In October 2024, Montrose was awarded a five-year, $249 million contract from the U.S. Army Corps of Engineers to provide environmental support to the Mobile District, South Atlantic Division, including addressing air and water quality, PFAS, pollution prevention, and hazardous waste.

== Operations ==
The company has over 3,500 employees and over 90 offices across the U.S., Canada, Europe & Australia. Services provided by the company include comprehensive air measurement and laboratory services, regulatory compliance, PFAS solutions, permitting, engineering, and remediation.

=== Board of directors ===
The current president and CEO of Montrose is Vijay Manthripragada.

As of 2024, the current Montrose board members are:

- Richard Perlman, board chairman, founder of ExamWorks Group, Inc.
- Vijay Manthripragada
- James A. Price, co-founder of ExamWorks Group, Inc.
- Miguel Fernandez de Castro, CFO of ExamWorks Group, Inc.
- Dr. Robin Newmark, former executive director of the U.S. Department of Energy National Renewable Energy Laboratory
- Peter Graham, partner at One Better Ventures LLC, former chairman of Seventh Generation Inc.
- Janet Risi, CEO of Subway Independent Purchasing Cooperative
- Tom Presby, former COO of Deloitte

== Subsidiaries ==
As of 2024, Montrose has over 35 subsidiaries, including:

- Advanced GeoServices Corp.
- Air, Water and Soil Laboratories, Inc.
- AirKinetics, Inc.
- The Center for Toxicology and Environmental Health (CTEH)
- Emerging Compounds Treatment Technologies, Inc. (ECT2)
- Enthalpy Analytical
- Environmental Alliance, Inc.
- Environmental Chemistry, Inc.
- Environmental Intelligence, LLC
- Environmental Standards, Inc.
- Epic Environmental Pty Ltd.
- ES Engineering Services, LLC
- Frontier Analytical Laboratories
- FRS Environmental Remediation, Inc.
- GreenPath Energy Ltd.
- Horizon Water and Environment, LLC
- Huco Consulting, Inc.
- Industrial Automation Group, Inc.
- Leymaster Environmental Consulting, LLC
- Matrix Solutions, Inc.
- Montrose Air Quality Services, LLC
- Montrose Environmental Solutions, LLC
- Montrose Measurements and Analytics, LLC
- MSE Group, LLC
- Nautilus Environmental, Inc.
- Origins Laboratory, LLC
- Paragon Infinity
- Paragon Soil & Environmental Consulting, Inc.
- PARS Environmental, Inc.
- SensibleIoT, LLC
- Spirit Environmental, LLC
- TriAD Environmental Consultants, Inc.
- Two Dot Consulting, LLC
- Vandrensning ApS.
- Vista Analytical Laboratory, Inc.

== Controversies ==
=== CTEH toxicology reports ===
In 2019, a Grist report detailed Montrose subsidiary CTEH's alleged mishandling of toxicology reports, including work performed during a chemical explosion in Houston, Texas, that one toxicologist described as "a sloppy job."

=== CTEH plane crash ===
On February 22, 2023, a Beechcraft Super King Air with five employees of CTEH crashed near a 3M plant, killing all five on board. The employees were en route to investigate an explosion at a metal factory in Bedford, Ohio.

== Awards ==
Montrose has been awarded the Occupational Excellence Achievement Award for several years by the National Safety Council. The company has also been named to the Engineering News-Record "Top Environmental Firms," ranking in the top ten.
