= NuStar Energy =

U.S. energy company

NuStar Energy L.P.
- Industry: Oil and Gasoline, Transportation
- Founded: April 16, 2001
- Founder: Bill Greehey
- Headquarters: San Antonio, Texas; United States
- Key people: Brad Barron (President & CEO); Tom Shoaf (CFO)
- Products: Petrochemical
- Revenue: ▲$1.9 billion USD (2018)
- Owner: Sunoco LP (2024–present)
- Website: www.nustarenergy.com

NuStar Energy L.P. is a subsidiary of Sunoco LP, and formerly was a publicly traded master limited partnership. The company is one of the largest independent liquids terminal and pipeline operators in the nation. NuStar owns 8,700 miles of pipeline and 79 terminal and storage facilities that store and distribute crude oil, refined products and specialty liquids.

The partnership's combined system has approximately 93 million barrels of storage capacity, and NuStar has operations in the United States, Canada, Mexico, the Netherlands, including Sint Eustatius in the Caribbean, and the United Kingdom.

Operations are managed by NuStar GP, LLC. As of December 31, 2015, NuStar GP, LLC had 1,251 domestic employees and certain of their wholly owned subsidiaries had 393 employees performing services for their international operations.

In 2018 Inter Pipeline acquired NuStar Energy L.P.'s European bulk liquid storage business ("NuStar Europe") for cash consideration of US$270 million. The following year, it received the first shipment of long haul Permian Crude at Corpus Christi terminal.

In January 2024, Sunoco LP, a US-based owner of gas stations, announced it was acquiring NuStar for approximately $7.3 billion. This transaction was completed in May.

== Crockett facility fire ==
On 15 October 2019, the Nustar Fire, a 15-acre wildfire, was caused by an explosion of two ethanol storage tanks at NuStar's Crockett, California, fuel depot.

== See also ==
- William Greehey
