= Premcor =

- Industry: Oil Refining
- Defunct: 2005
- Fate: Acquired by Valero
- Headquarters: Greenwich, Connecticut, United States

Premcor (formerly NYSE symbol PCO) was a Fortune 500 oil refinery group based in Greenwich, Connecticut. It operated five refineries, which are located in Port Arthur, Texas; Memphis, Tennessee; Lima, Ohio; Hartford, Illinois; and Delaware City, Delaware with a combined crude oil volume processing capacity of approximately 768,120 barrels per day (122,121 m^{3}/d) (July, 2007).

Premcor was acquired by Valero in 2005. Valero would later sell the Lima facility to Husky Energy in July 2007 and close the Delaware City refinery in November 2009.
