= George Benjamin =

George Benjamin may refer to:

- George Benjamin (Orangeman) (1799–1864), Canadian political figure
- George Benjamin (composer) (born 1960), English composer
- George Benjamin Jr. (1919–1944), American soldier who fought in the Philippines campaigns of 1944–1945, and received a posthumous Medal of Honor

== See also ==
- Georges C. Benjamin (born 1952), American public health official
