= Al Szolack =

American basketball player (born 1950)

Personal information
- Born: 1950 (age 75–76)

Career information
- High school: Woodbury (Woodbury, New Jersey)
- College: Atlantic Cape CC (1968–1970); Rowan (1971–1973)
- NBA draft: 1973: undrafted
- Playing career: 1974–1975
- Position: Shooting guard / small forward

Career history
- 1974–1975: Washington Generals

"Big Al" Szolack (born 1950) is an American retired basketball player best known for his time spent on the Washington Generals, a traveling exhibition team who plays against, and always loses to, the Harlem Globetrotters. He played for just the 1974–75 season, one in which the Generals lost all 245 contests. Szolack became a favorite among the Globetrotters and was selected as the "unwitting" participant in many of their predetermined entertainment plays.

== Early life and college ==
Szolack was raised in Woodbury, New Jersey. He was described as "reed-thin" but was a "sniper" on the basketball court while playing for Woodbury High School, from which he graduated in 1968. His ability earned him all-conference and all-county honors, and Szolack then continued his career at Atlantic Cape Community College for two years. After community college, Szolack attended Glassboro State College (now called Rowan University), a then-NAIA school located in Glassboro, New Jersey. He was an integral player on the team, serving as one of their best substitutes off of the bench for head coach Jack Collins. In both seasons the team qualified for the national tournament. Szolack graduated from Glassboro State in the spring of 1973.

== Professional and later life ==
Right after college, Szolack tried out for the Scranton Apollos in the Eastern Professional Basketball League, but he was the last cut and did not make the roster. He came upon the Washington Generals when he went to see the Globetrotters at the Spectrum in Philadelphia and obtained Red Klotz' phone number. Szolack spent the next year touring the world and playing against (losing to) the Globetrotters. They played seven days a week and sometimes played twice in a day.

After his exhibition basketball career ended, he moved to Fort Lauderdale, Florida and became a bartender. Then, his 54-year-old mother—with whom he was very close—died from a heart attack. He began to self-medicate with drugs and alcohol, and even admitted later to using up to $1,000 worth of cocaine per day for a time. From ages 27 through 34, Szolack's life was in ruins. In an interview, he later admitted, "Drugs turned me into a thief, a liar, a cheat ... One day I found myself sitting in a corner, holding a shotgun. I lived the life of a vampire, peeking out windows for hours at a time. Sometimes I had only enough energy to get from the bed to the sofa. I was sick, very sick. I didn't live ... I existed."

After not knowing where to turn, he made one last attempt for help by visiting his fiancée's mother. She gave him a hug; it was this hug that he claims turned his life around. He eventually dedicated his life to keeping children off of drugs and alcohol. He now goes by the nickname Al "Hugs Not Drugs" Szolack and serves as an abuse awareness director at Hammonton High School in Hammonton, New Jersey. He is also a motivational speaker and runs an annual basketball camp which he calls "Big Al's Basketball Camp." Szolack travels across the United States giving speeches, many times at colleges and universities, and he is on the NCAA-approved speaker roster.

Szolack is married to Carol Szolack; they have two daughters, Karolena and Olivia. As of 2011, they reside in Mullica Hill, New Jersey.
