= Dave Budd =

American basketball player (born 1938)

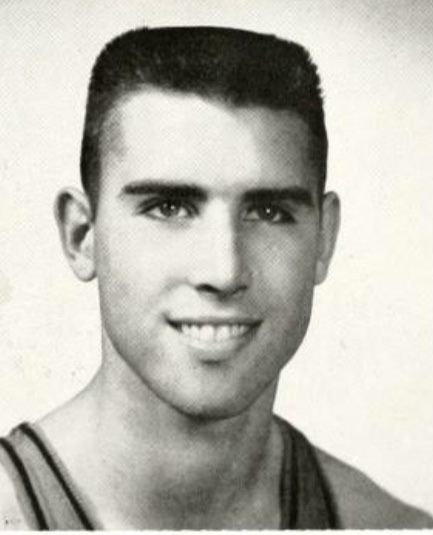
- Budd from the 1960 "Howler"

Personal information
- Born: October 28, 1938 (age 88) Woodbury, New Jersey, U.S.
- Listed height: 6 ft 6 in (1.98 m)
- Listed weight: 205 lb (93 kg)

Career information
- High school: Woodbury (Woodbury, New Jersey)
- College: Wake Forest (1957–1960)
- NBA draft: 1960: 2nd round, 10th overall pick
- Drafted by: New York Knicks
- Playing career: 1960–1966
- Position: Small forward
- Number: 10

Career history
- 1960–1965: New York Knicks
- 1965–1966: Camden Bullets

Career highlights
- 2× Second-team All-ACC (1958, 1960)

Career NBA statistics
- Points: 2,505 (7.1 ppg)
- Rebounds: 1,623 (4.6 rpg)
- Assists: 337 (1.0 apg)
- Stats at NBA.com
- Stats at Basketball Reference

David L. Budd (born October 28, 1938) is a retired American basketball player who played for the New York Knicks in the National Basketball Association. He played college ball at Division I Wake Forest University in Winston-Salem, N.C.

== Early life ==
Budd grew up in Woodbury, N.J. and attended Woodbury Junior-Senior High School. By sophomore year, it was evident that basketball was his true calling. Standing at 6 feet 6 inches (1.98 m) and weighing close to 200 pounds (91 kg), Budd was a very imposing player. He possessed technical skills comparable to a point guard and blossomed into a star. Throughout his high school career, Budd was mentored by Woodbury Junior High School teacher and assistant basketball coach Joe Colone. Colone was a former NBA player for the New York Knicks and could provide excellent coaching and tips to prepare Budd for playing collegiate (and later, professional) basketball. Under Colone's tutelage, he earned two first team All-Colonial Conference selections during his junior and senior years as well as an All-South Jersey selection his senior year. His talent interested many colleges, but Budd ultimately chose to play at Wake Forest University.

== College career ==
After graduation from high school in 1956, Budd attended Wake Forest. Due to NCAA rules (circa 1971 and earlier), college freshmen were not allowed to participate in varsity basketball. When he became an eligible sophomore during the 1957–58 season, he played in 23 games, averaging 15.8 points per game (ppg) on a 47.5 field goal percentage as a forward. He also grabbed 8.5 rebounds per game (rpg) and shot 66.8% from the charity stripe. Assists were not yet tracked in college. His junior year campaign saw him play in 24 games and average 14.6 ppg on 43.2% shooting. Budd snatched 8.6 rebounds per game and had a 66.8 free throw %. As a senior, he played in all 28 games while averaging 10.7 ppg and a career-high 10.0 rpg. Shot 49.7% from the field and 72.7% from the free throw line. Budd played with future NBA broadcaster (and then-sophomore) Billy Packer during his senior season. He was also a tough but not dirty, player and got placed on probation for fighting, following the infamous Wake Forest-UNC brawl at Winston-Salem in 1959. Wake Forest's new all-purpose exercise facility, the Kenneth D. Miller Center (built in 2001), is home to a basketball gym on the third floor that is used as an extra practice court for both the men's and women's basketball teams. It is named the Dave Budd Gymnasium in his honor. For his career, Budd played in 75 contests and held career averages of 13.5 points & 9.1 rebounds per game as well as a 46.6 FG% and 69.2 FT%.

=== Achievements ===
- Second Team All-ACC as a sophomore (1958) and senior (1960).
- Named the team's Most Valuable Player following both his sophomore and junior campaigns.
- Voted team captain for sophomore season.
- As a senior, Budd led the Demon Deacons to the first of two consecutive ACC titles.
- Recorded 682 rebounds
- Scored 1,014 career points in just three seasons

== Professional career ==
After enjoying success at the college level, Budd was drafted after his senior year by the New York Knicks in 1960. He was the 10th overall selection in the second round (at the time there were fewer teams in the league and each round only had eight selections). He was drafted the same year that Oscar Robertson and Jerry West were picked No. 1 and #2, respectively. Though never an All-Star, Budd did enjoy moderate success while playing at the highest level. One of his claims to fame was that he was one of the three centers for the Knicks that attempted to guard Wilt Chamberlain on the night of his record-setting 100-point performance. On that night, Budd was the only opponent who mustered a double-double, scoring 13 points and grabbing 10 rebounds in 27 minutes. Also on that same night, Budd was the only other player in the game to collect a double digit number of rebounds (Chamberlain had 25). Budd is the only person from Woodbury, NJ to ever play in the NBA, and wore No. 10 as his jersey number.

I had played him before and had moderate success for short periods of time. You couldn't play him conventionally because he was so big. The only thing you could attempt to do was either front him, and in that case they'd try to lob it in to him, or beat him down the floor and set up where he wanted to get and force him out a couple of extra steps. The guy weighed 300 or 270, so that wasn't easy, either.

— Budd, on guarding Wilt Chamberlain

=== Achievements ===
- Ranked 6th in the league in field goal percentage (.493) during the 1962–63 season.
- Ranked 9th in the league in true shooting percentage (.540) during the 1962–63 season.

== Career statistics ==
Legend
| GP | Games played | GS | Games started | MPG | Minutes per game |
| FG% | Field goal percentage | 3P% | 3-point field goal percentage | FT% | Free throw percentage |
| RPG | Rebounds per game | APG | Assists per game | SPG | Steals per game |
| BPG | Blocks per game | PPG | Points per game | **Bold** | Career high |

=== NBA ===
==== Regular season ====
| Year | Team | GP | MPG | FG% | FT% | RPG | APG | PPG |
|---|---|---|---|---|---|---|---|---|
| 1960–61 | New York | 61 | 17.6 | .432 | .649 | 4.9 | .7 | 6.5 |
| 1961–62 | New York | **79** | 17.3 | .436 | .597 | 4.4 | **1.1** | 6.5 |
| 1962–63 | New York | 78 | **22.1** | **.493** | **.748** | **5.1** | **1.1** | **9.5** |
| 1963–64 | New York | 73 | 14.1 | .431 | .730 | 3.8 | .8 | 4.7 |
| 1964–65 | New York | 62 | 19.2 | .482 | .712 | 5.0 | 1.0 | 8.3 |
| Career | | 353 | 18.1 | .460 | .682 | 4.6 | 1.0 | 7.1 |
