= Leon Johnson (end) =

American football player

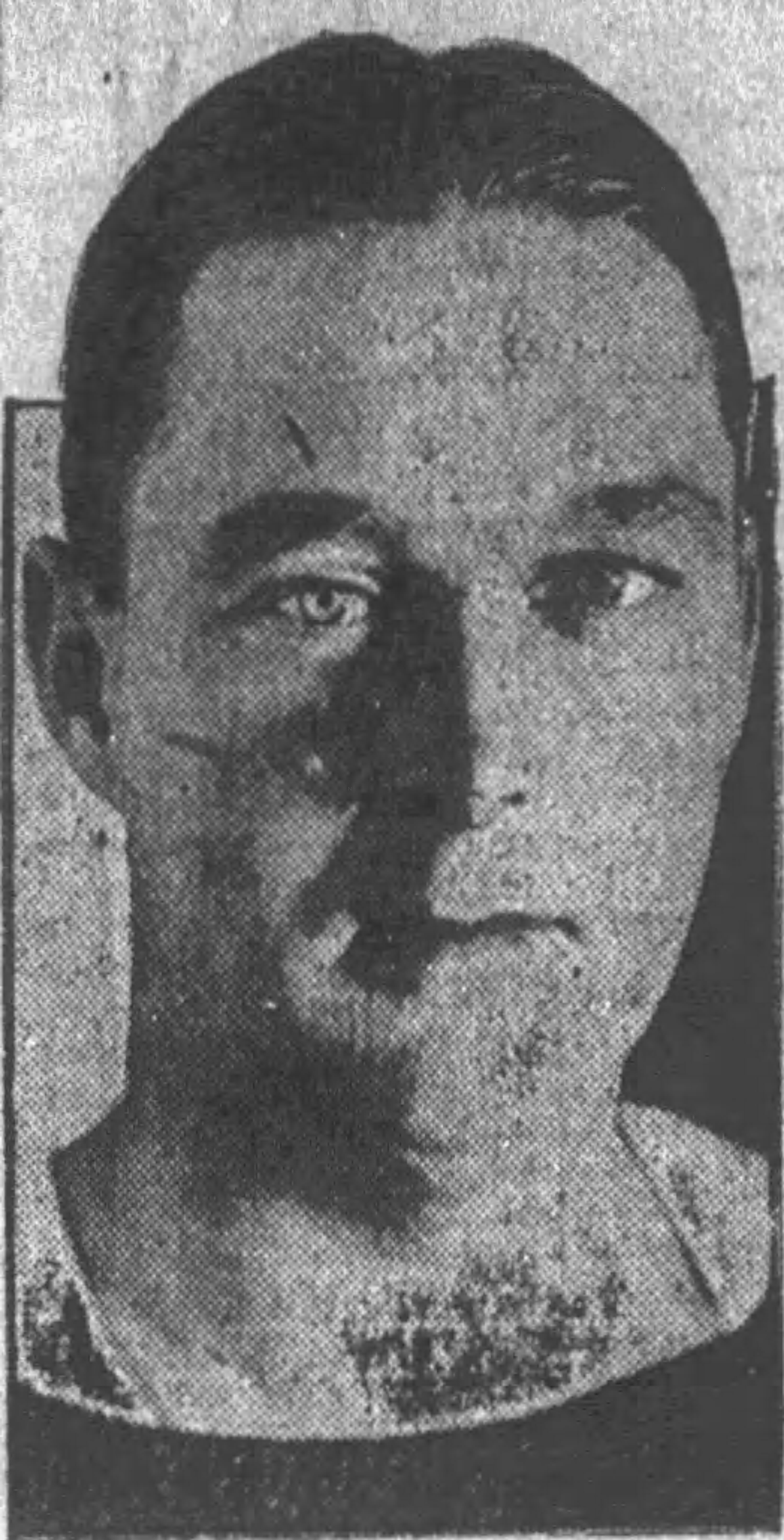
- Leon Johnson, 1928

Profile
- Position: End

Personal information
- Born: 1902
- Died: September, 1978; Florence, New Jersey
- Listed height: 5 ft 11 in (1.80 m)
- Listed weight: 185 lb (84 kg)

Career information
- High school: Woodbury (NJ)
- College: Lafayette

Career history
- Philadelphia Quakers (1926); Atlantic City; Millville Maroons (1928); Orange Tornadoes (1929)

Career statistics
- Games: 5

Leon Bernard Johnson (1902 – September 1978) was an American football player.

Johnson was born in 1902. He attended Woodbury High School in Woodbury, New Jersey. He played for Woodbury's football team from 1919 to 1922 and was team captain in 1921 and 1922. He was named to the New Jersey all-state team as a senior. He also played baseball and basketball at Woodbury and was captain of the basketball team. After graduating from Woodbury, he attended Allentown Prep, where he lettered in all three sports and graduated in 1924.

In 1925, he enrolled at Lafayette College and played for the freshman football team. He was forced to cut short his collegiate career due to "family circumstances". He played professional football for the Philadelphia Quakers team that won the American Football League championship in 1926. He also played for an Atlantic City team. He next played at the end position for the Millville Maroons in 1928. In 1929, he played at the end position for the Orange Tornadoes of the National Football League (NFL). He appeared in five NFL games, one as a starter, for the Tornadoes.
