= Larry Kirschling =

American football player and coach

Biographical details
- Born: Hibbing, Minnesota, U.S.
- Died: February 15, 2003; Woolwich Township, New Jersey, U.S.
- Education: Villanova (1942)

Playing career
- ?: Duquesne

Coaching career (HC unless noted)
- 1941–1942: Saint Francis (PA) (assistant)
- 1944–1947: Paulsboro HS (NJ)
- 1948: Saint Francis (PA)

Lawrence A. Kirschling (died February 15, 2003) was an American football player and coach. He served as the head football coach at Saint Francis University in Loretto, Pennsylvania in 1948.

Kirschlingwas a graduate of Villanova University and played college football at Duquesne University in Pittsburgh.
