= Gateway Regional High School (New Jersey) =

High school in Gloucester County, New Jersey, US

Gateway Regional High School District

Address
- 775 Tanyard Road Woodbury Heights, Gloucester County, New Jersey, 08096; United States
- Coordinates: 39.819012°N 75.139791°W

District information
- Grades: 7-12
- Established: 1964
- Superintendent: Shannon Whalen
- Business administrator: Janice Grassia
- Schools: 1

Students and staff
- Enrollment: 875 (as of 2024–25)
- Faculty: 83.5 FTEs
- Student–teacher ratio: 10.5:1

Other information
- District Factor Group: CD
- Website: www.gatewayhs.com
Ind.	Per pupil	District spending	Rank (*)	7-12 average	%± vs. average
1A	Total Spending	$23,628	40	$18,891	25.1%
1	Budgetary Cost	16,871	33	14,586	15.7%
2	Classroom Instruction	8,986	24	8,339	7.8%
6	Support Services	3,198	42	2,114	51.3%
8	Administrative Cost	1,414	10	1,561	−9.4%
10	Operations & Maintenance	1,986	25	1,798	10.5%
13	Extracurricular Activities	982	31	673	45.9%
16	Median Teacher Salary	67,368	23	65,769
Data from NJDoE 2014 Taxpayers' Guide to Education Spending. *Of 7-12 districts with any number of students. Lowest spending=1; Highest=47

Gateway Regional High School

Information
- Type: Public high school
- NCES School ID: 340582002554
- Principal: Jeffrey Pierro
- Faculty: 83.5 FTEs
- Grades: 7-12
- Enrollment: 862 (as of 2024–25)
- Student to teacher ratio: 10.3:1
- Colors: Royal blue White
- Athletics conference: Colonial Conference (general); West Jersey Football League (football)
- Team name: Gators
- Newspaper: The Chomp

Gateway Regional High School is a regional school district and public high school serving students in seventh through twelfth grades from the boroughs of National Park, Wenonah, Westville and Woodbury Heights, four communities in Gloucester County, in the U.S. state of New Jersey.

As of the 2024–25 school year, the school had an enrollment of 862 students and 83.5 classroom teachers (on an FTE basis), for a student–teacher ratio of 10.3:1. There were 227 students (26.3% of enrollment) eligible for free lunch and 64 (7.4% of students) eligible for reduced-cost lunch.

The district participates in the Interdistrict Public School Choice Program, which allows non-resident students to attend school in the district at no cost to their parents, with tuition covered by the resident district. Available slots are announced annually by grade.

== History ==
The name "Gateway Regional High School District" was chosen by a study committee in April 1962, using the term "gateway" that had been applied to that portion of the county. The committee was established after the Woodbury Public Schools notified the four sending communities of National Park, Wenonah, Westville and Woodbury Heights—which all had existing K-8 school districts—that their students could no longer be accommodated at Woodbury High School for grades 9-12 after the 1963-64 school year. The district's original plan called for creation of a regional junior high school for grades 7-9 while students already enrolled would continue to attend Woodbury High School for grades 10-12. After a June 1962 referendum was rejected in three of the four municipalities, the district was formally established after a second proposal was passed by each of the four communities in December 1962, leading to the establishment of the first board of education.

Voters overwhelmingly approved a May 1963 referendum for $1.6 million (equivalent to $17 million in 2025) to buy the land and construct a facility on a plot covering 38 acres (15 ha) that was designed to accommodate an enrollment of 800 to 1,000 students.

The school opened for the 1964-65 school year.

The district had been classified by the New Jersey Department of Education as being in District Factor Group "CD", the sixth-highest of eight groupings. District Factor Groups organize districts statewide to allow comparison by common socioeconomic characteristics of the local districts. From lowest socioeconomic status to highest, the categories are A, B, CD, DE, FG, GH, I and J.

== Awards, recognition and rankings ==
The school was the 195th-ranked public high school in New Jersey out of 339 schools statewide in New Jersey Monthly magazine's September 2014 cover story on the state's "Top Public High Schools", using a new ranking methodology. The school had been ranked 141st in the state of 328 schools in 2012, after being ranked 197th in 2010 out of 322 schools listed. The magazine ranked the school 151st in 2008 out of 316 schools. The school was ranked 176th in the magazine's September 2006 issue, which surveyed 316 schools across the state. Schooldigger.com ranked the school 181st out of 381 public high schools statewide in its 2011 rankings (a decrease of 29 positions from the 2010 ranking) which were based on the combined percentage of students classified as proficient or above proficient on the mathematics (78.7%) and language arts literacy (93.9%) components of the High School Proficiency Assessment (HSPA).

== Athletics ==
The Gateway Regional High School Gators compete in the Colonial Conference, which is comprised of public high schools in Camden and Gloucester counties, and operates under the supervision of the New Jersey State Interscholastic Athletic Association (NJSIAA). With 405 students in grades 10-12, the school was classified by the NJSIAA for the 2022–24 school years as Group I South for most athletic competition purposes. The football team competes in the Royal Division of the 94-team West Jersey Football League superconference and was classified by the NJSIAA as Group I South for football for 2024–2026, which included schools with 185 to 482 students.

The school participates as the host school / lead agency for joint cooperative cross country running, co-ed swimming and wrestling teams with Woodbury Junior-Senior High School. These co-op programs operate under agreements scheduled to expire at the end of the 2023–24 school year.

The field hockey team was the South II sectional champion in 1971 and won the South Jersey Group I state sectional championship in 2001.

The 1978 softball team ran their record to 18-3 after winning the Group II state championship by a score of 6-2 in the final of the tournament against a Queen of Peace High School that came into the game undefeated.

The 1992 boys' soccer team finished the season with a record of 21-3 after winning the Group II state championship, defeating Harrison High School by a score of 2-0 in the tournament final.

The boys' baseball team won the 2009 South Jersey Group I NJSIAA state sectional Title, advancing to the Group I tournament where they lost to David Brearley High School 6–2 in the semi-final round.

== Administration ==
Core members of the district and school administration are:

- Shannon Whalen, superintendent
- Janice Grassia, business administrator and board secretary
- Jeffrey Pierro, principal

== Board of education ==
The district's board of education, comprised of nine members, sets policy and oversees the fiscal and educational operation of the district through its administration. As a Type II school district, the board's trustees are elected directly by voters to serve three-year terms of office on a staggered basis, with three seats up for election each year held (since 2012) as part of the November general election. The board appoints a superintendent to oversee the district's day-to-day operations and a business administrator to supervise the business functions of the district. Seats on the district's board of education are allocated based on the population of the constituent municipalities, with three seats assigned to Westville (the largest community in the district) and two each to National Park, Wenonah and Woodbury Heights.

== Notable alumni ==
- Helen Campo (born 1962), flute virtuoso
- Grace Helbig (born 1985, class of 2003), comedian, actress and internet personality
- Steve Squyres (born 1957), Chief Scientist at Blue Origin and former principal investigator for the science payload on the Mars Exploration Rover Project
- Tim Squyres (born 1959), Academy Award-nominated film editor of Crouching Tiger, Hidden Dragon, Hulk, and Syriana, among others
- Stephen Starr (born 1957), CEO of Starr Restaurants
