= Zack Valentine =

American football player (born 1957)

No. 54
- Position: Linebacker

Personal information
- Born: May 29, 1957 (age 69); Edenton, North Carolina, U.S.
- Listed height: 6 ft 2 in (1.88 m)
- Listed weight: 220 lb (100 kg)

Career information
- High school: John A. Holmes (Edenton)
- College: East Carolina
- NFL draft: 1979: 2nd round, 56th overall pick

Career history
- Pittsburgh Steelers (1979–1981); Philadelphia Eagles (1982)

Awards and highlights
- Super Bowl champion (XIV)

Career NFL statistics
- Sacks: 1
- Fumble recoveries: 2
- Stats at Pro Football Reference

Zack Valentine (born May 29, 1957) is an American former professional football player who played linebacker in the National Football League (NFL) for four seasons for the Pittsburgh Steelers and Philadelphia Eagles. As a rookie, he won a Super Bowl ring with the Steelers in Super Bowl XIV. Valentine played his prep years at John A. Holmes High School in Edenton, North Carolina.

Valentine was the head football coach of Woodbury High School, in Woodbury, New Jersey, from 2002 until his retirement following the 2012 season. Valentine had a record of 82–37 at Woodbury, recording the second most wins by a head coach, and won three state sectional titles. He lives in Logan Township. Chris Pressley, a former NFL player, played for Valentine from 2000 to 2003.
