= Rebekah Marine =

American model

- Born: January 7, 1987 (age 39)
- Citizenship: United States
- Occupations: Model; Motivational speaker
- Known for: Bionic Model

Rebekah Marine Paster (born January 7, 1987), also known as The Bionic Model, is an American model and motivational speaker. She is a congenital amputee and was born without a right forearm.

== Personal life ==
Marine is from Woodbury, New Jersey and graduated from Woodbury Junior-Senior High School in 2005. She was born with symbrachydactyly, a congenital condition that left her without a right forearm. Marine received an academic scholarship to Rowan University, where she graduated with a Bachelors in Marketing.

Marine married in 2018, wearing a customized gold prosthetic. She was featured in season 17 of TLC's show, Say Yes to the Dress, airing in 2019.

== Career ==
Marine began modeling when she was 22, after completing her college degree. Wearing an I-LIMB hand by TouchBionics, for which she is an ambassador, Marine calls herself "The Bionic Model".

Marine was featured in Nordstom's 2015 Anniversary catalog and has walked in the New York Fashion Week on multiple occasions. In 2015, she walked the runway for Indian fashion designer Archana Kochhar. She has also modeled designs by Antonio Urzi. In 2016, Marine walked in the Runway of Dreams Gala and Fashion Show in New York City, an event meant to raise awareness of the need for adaptive clothing, to showcase new designs from Tommy Hilfiger for people who have disabilities.

Marine is an ambassador for the Lucky-Fin Project, a nonprofit organization that supports those with upper limb differences. In this role, she gives motivational speeches across the United States on the topics of self-love and embracing differences.
