= Russell Carter (basketball) =

American professional basketball player

Personal information
- Born: March 30, 1985 (age 41) Frankfurt, Germany
- Listed height: 6 ft 4 in (1.93 m)
- Listed weight: 200 lb (91 kg)

Career information
- High school: Paulsboro (Paulsboro, New Jersey)
- College: Notre Dame (2003–2007)
- NBA draft: 2007: undrafted
- Playing career: 2007–2017
- Position: Shooting guard

Career history
- 2007–2008: Solsonica Rieti
- 2007–2008: Tulsa 66ers
- 2008: Sioux Falls Skyforce
- 2009–2010: Austin Toros
- 2010: Verviers-Pepinster
- 2011: Powerade Tigers
- 2011: Iowa Energy
- 2012: Panteras de Miranda
- 2012: Frayles de Guasave
- 2012–2013: Orchies
- 2013–2014: Rouen
- 2014–2015: Niigata Albirex BB
- 2016: Toros de Aragua
- 2016–2017: Guaros de Lara

Career highlights
- First-team All-Big East (2007)

Russell Demetrius Carter (born March 30, 1985) is an American former professional basketball player who last played in 2017.

== Personal ==
Born in Frankfurt, Germany to Russell and Tina Carter, Russell moved to Paulsboro, New Jersey in the United States as an infant. He has two younger siblings. Carter's father played football for Pittsburgh during the mid-1970s, and his uncle (George Jamison) played football for Cincinnati. He also has a cousin, Sean Redman, who played football for Penn State.

== Paulsboro High School ==
Russell Carter played basketball for his hometown high school's Red Raiders from 2000 to 2003. Carter was a four-year starter and saw his scoring average increase each year. As one of the best players in South Jersey during his junior and senior seasons, his reputation as a tremendous jumper and deadly shooter spread.

As a senior, Carter averaged 30.0 points, 11.2 rebounds and 3.4 assists while leading his team to Colonial Conference and South Jersey Group I crowns. Paulsboro High School fell to Bloomfield Tech High School in the Group I State Championship by a score of 61–59, however, on a full-court driving lay-up as time expired. Despite having never won a state championship, Russell Carter garnered many achievements and accolades during his high school tenure.

== University of Notre Dame ==
=== Freshman season ===
Carter's collegiate debut came against Mount St. Mary's, where he played for five minutes (Carter's season high in minutes was seven against Central Michigan). In those five minutes, he achieved a three-point field goal attempt, earning the first points of his career.

=== Sophomore season ===
Russell's second year at Notre Dame marked steady improvement in all areas of his game. He more than doubled his contest appearances from freshman year by checking into 24 games, even making his first career start (in the NIT opening round versus Holy Cross).

=== Junior season ===
Carter's junior season was strong, with a scoring average of 11.5 that more than tripled the 3.5 of his sophomore year. He started 28 of the 30 contests he appeared in. During a consecutive three-game streak, Carter scored 20, 21 and 22 points (against Marquette, Providence and DePaul, respectively). His season and then-career high of 24 came against Louisville on an 8-for-11 shooting performance. It was for his performance in the Notre Dame-DePaul game of March 4, 2006 that he received the Wendell Smith Award as MVP.

=== Senior season ===
After being named as a tri-captain with teammates Rob Kurz and Colin Falls, Russell managed to not only up his points per game by 5.6 to lead his team at 17.1, but also led the Fighting Irish into the NCAA tournament, losing to Winthrop in the first round. He scored a career-high 32 points on 10-for-20 shooting against St. John's, but fell just 17 points shy of scoring 1,000 for his career, ending with 983. Carter garnered a First Team All-Big East selection along with teammate Falls as a senior.

He went undrafted in the 2007 NBA draft after failing to impress any scouts during pre-draft camps. Two months later, however, a professional team in Italy signed him.

=== Awards and honors ===
- First Team All Big East (2007)
- Big East All Tournament Team (2007)
- NABC District 10 First Team (2007)
- USBWA All-District V (2007)
- Notre Dame Monogram Club Team MVP (2007)
- Big East Player of the Week (three times):

-Week of December 27, 2006
-Week of January 2, 2007
-Week of January 15, 2007

- Big East Weekly Honor Roll

-Week of March 6, 2006

- Wendell Smith Award (March 4, 2006)
- Notre Dame Most Improved Player Award

== Professional career ==
After going undrafted in the 2007 draft, Carter was signed to AMG Nuova Solsonica Rieti (Italy Serie A1) for the 2007–2008 season, averaging 23min, 8.9ppg, 2.4rpg. Later he signed with Dinamo Sassari (Italy A2), leading them to a 4–1 record (18ppg, 6reb) before departing the team for the NBDL. Carter was drafted by Sioux Falls but immediately traded to the Tulsa 66ers under coach Joey Meyers. posting averages of 10.3ppg and 5.5rpg.

Carter played in the 2008 NBA Summer League (Utah Jazz) but was sidelined with a MCL Injury suffered in one of the games. Rehabbing his summer injury, Carter didn't join a team until late December with BCM Gravelines (France Pro A) for the remainder of the 2008–2009 season. On team filled with talent, Carter posted averages of 20min, 8.6ppg, 3.7rpg as BCM made the playoffs, only to be eliminated by French Pro A powerhouse Le Mans.

In the 2009–10 season Carter signed to the NBDL and was drafted 21st by the Austin Toros under Coach Quin Snyder. Hampered by injuries the entire season Carter posted averages below those of his previous NBDL campaign (6.4ppg, 2.4rpg). Towards the end of the regular season Carter left the team to play overseas in both Venezuela (Bucaneros de La Guaira- 17.4ppg, 8.1rpg) and Colombia (Bucaros de Bucaramanga-27.2ppg, 7.5rpg).

In 2010–11, Carter had a brief stint with Verviers-Pepinster (Belgium 1st Division). After coach Ivica Skelin was fired due to a losing record, Carter opted out of his contract to play in Philippines (PBA) for the Powerade Tigers.
