= Woodbury Country Club =

Coordinates: 39.832°N 75.142°W

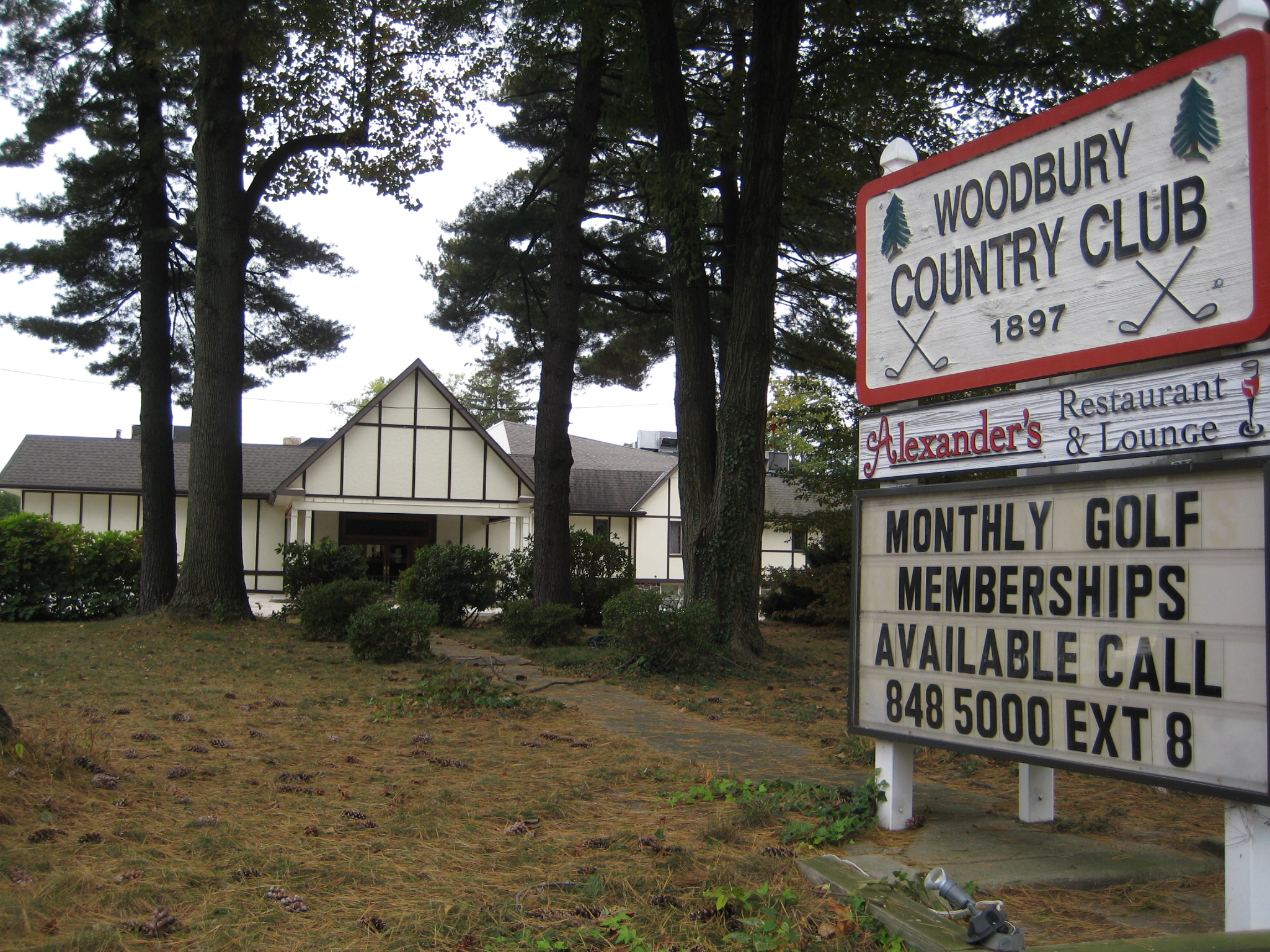
- Interactive map of Woodbury Country Club

Club information
- Location: 467 Cooper St. Woodbury, New Jersey, U.S.
- Established: 1897
- Type: Private
- Operator: John Fitzgerald
- Total holes: 9
- Website: Official website

Forward tees
- Designed by: H. H. Clarke (redesigned by Alexander H. Findlay)
- Par: 35
- Length: 2,960 yards
- Course rating: 36.7

Back tees
- Par: 36
- Length: 3,066 yards
- Course rating: 34.9

The Woodbury Country Club (WCC) was a private golf club in Woodbury, New Jersey. It was incorporated in August 1897 and had been one of the 100 oldest private golf clubs in the country as of August 2009. Among some of the club's original officers was George Gill Green, a patent medicine entrepreneur, who served as the club's vice president. Due to the economy, the golf club was unable to sustain operations, and the club went into foreclosure in 2010.

== Notes ==
^a The golf course is described as being nine holes, but it actually has 13 different greens to shoot to.
