= Anthony Averett =

American football player (born 1994)

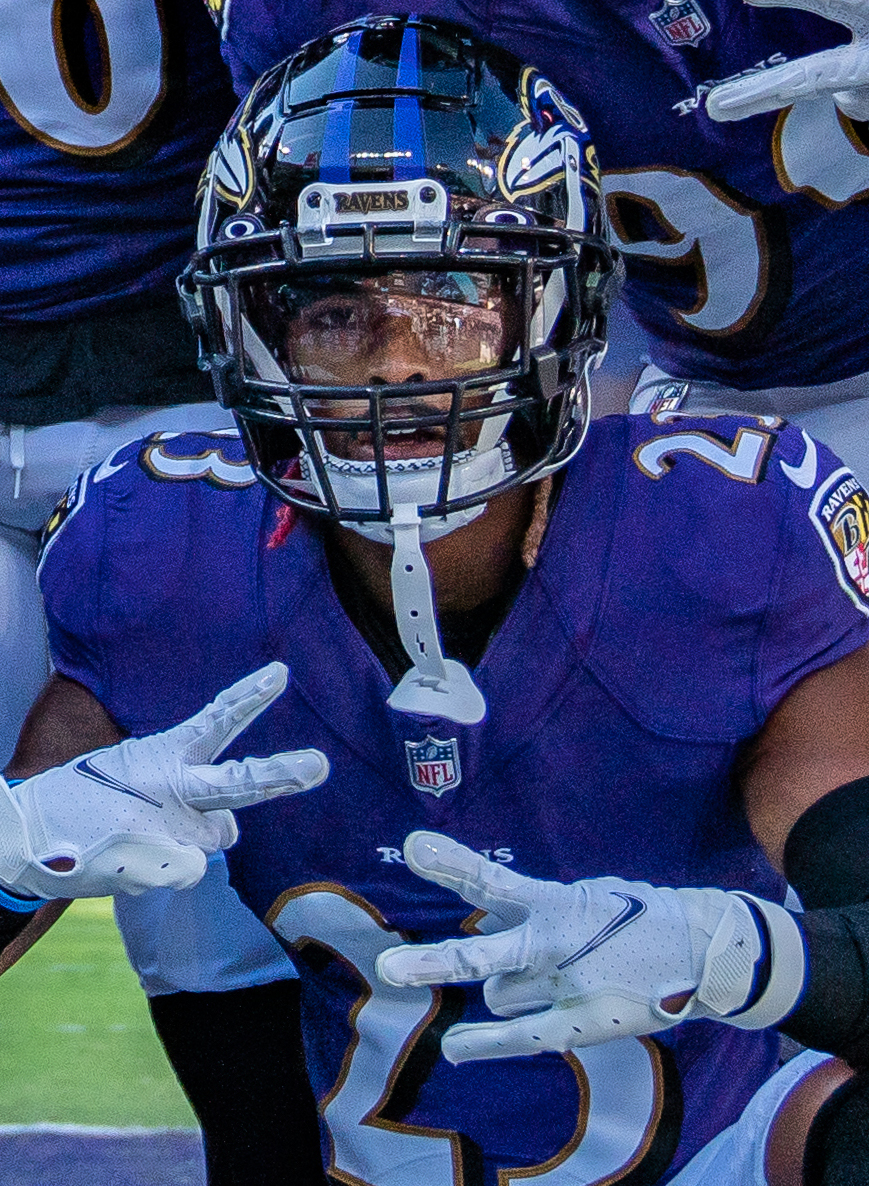
- Averett with the Baltimore Ravens in 2021

No. 28, 34, 23, 29
- Position: Cornerback

Personal information
- Born: November 30, 1994 (age 31); Woodbury, New Jersey, U.S.
- Listed height: 5 ft 11 in (1.80 m)
- Listed weight: 184 lb (83 kg)

Career information
- High school: Woodbury
- College: Alabama (2013–2017)
- NFL draft: 2018: 4th round, 118th overall pick

Career history
- Baltimore Ravens (2018–2021); Las Vegas Raiders (2022); San Francisco 49ers (2023)*; Detroit Lions (2023)*; Pittsburgh Steelers (2024); Houston Texans (2024)*
- * Offseason or practice squad member only

Awards and highlights
- 2× CFP national champion (2015, 2017)

Career NFL statistics as of 2024
- Total tackles: 114
- Pass deflections: 23
- Interceptions: 3
- Stats at Pro Football Reference

Anthony Averett (born November 30, 1994) is an American former professional football cornerback. He played five seasons in the National Football League (NFL) for the Baltimore Ravens and Las Vegas Raiders. He played college football for the Alabama Crimson Tide.

== Early life ==
Averett attended Woodbury Junior-Senior High School in Woodbury, New Jersey. He played football and ran track in high school. At the 2012 Penn Relays, he placed second in the long jump. His senior year, he was one of the best high school long jumpers in the nation, with a jump of 25 feet, two inches, which was the second-longest jump in New Jersey history. He also ran 10.6 seconds in the 100-meters, 6.46 seconds in the 55 meters and high jumped 6 feet, 4 inches. In football, he played defensive back and quarterback. Averett committed to the University of Alabama to play college football.

== College career ==
Averett redshirted his first year at Alabama in 2013 and played in only one game in 2014. In 2015, he played special teams, recording two tackles. Averett became a starter in 2016 and played in all 15 games, finishing with 48 tackles, one interception and also one sack.

== Professional career ==
Pre-draft measurables
Height	Weight	Arm length	Hand span	Wingspan	40-yard dash	10-yard split	20-yard split	20-yard shuttle	Three-cone drill	Vertical jump	Broad jump	Bench press
5 ft 11 1/8 in (1.81 m)	183 lb (83 kg)	30 1/4 in (0.77 m)	8 1/2 in (0.22 m)	5 ft 11 5/8 in (1.82 m)	4.36 s	1.49 s	2.54 s	4.40 s	6.93 s	31.5 in (0.80 m)	10 ft 10 in (3.30 m)	13 reps
All values are from NFL Combine/Pro Day

=== Baltimore Ravens ===
Averett was selected by the Baltimore Ravens in the fourth round, 118th overall, of the 2018 NFL draft.

On October 22, 2020, Averett was placed on injured reserve with a shoulder injury. He was activated on December 8.

On October 3, 2021, Averett intercepted Denver Broncos quarterback Drew Lock in the end zone, and helped the Ravens win 23–7. On December 26, in the team's Week 16 game against the Cincinnati Bengals, Averett suffered a fractured rib after taking a hit from Bengals tight end C. J. Uzomah.

=== Las Vegas Raiders ===
Averett signed with the Las Vegas Raiders on March 17, 2022. He was placed on injured reserve on September 12, after suffering a broken thumb in the team's Week 1 loss to the Los Angeles Chargers. Averett was activated on October 22, but was placed back on injured reserve on November 29 with a toe injury.

=== San Francisco 49ers ===
On August 3, 2023, Averett signed with the San Francisco 49ers. He was placed on injured reserve eight days later. Averett was released by San Francisco on August 17.

=== Detroit Lions ===
On October 10, 2023, the Detroit Lions signed Averett to their practice squad. He was released by the Lions on November 14.

=== Pittsburgh Steelers ===
On May 12, 2024, the Pittsburgh Steelers signed Averett to a one-year contract. He was released on August 20, and later re-signed to the practice squad. Averett was released by the Steelers on October 28.

=== Houston Texans ===
On January 6, 2025, Averett was signed to the Houston Texans' practice squad. He signed a reserve/future contract with Houston on January 21. Averett was released by the Texans on March 17.

On June 2, 2026, Averett joined the Syracuse Orange in recruiting capacity.

== Personal life ==
Averett is the nephew of Pro Bowl left tackle Bryant McKinnie.
