= Jack Pierce (hurdler) =

American hurdler (born 1962)

Personal information
- Full name: Jack Warren Pierce
- Born: September 23, 1962 (age 64) Cherry Hill, New Jersey, U.S.
Medal record
Men's athletics
Representing United States
Olympic Games
Bronze medal – third place	1992 Barcelona	110 m hurdles
World Championships
Silver medal – second place	1991 Tokyo	110 m hurdles
Bronze medal – third place	1993 Stuttgart	110 m hurdles

Jack Warren Pierce (born September 23, 1962, in Cherry Hill, New Jersey) is an American former hurdling athlete

Raised in Woodbury, New Jersey, he graduated Woodbury High School in 1980. He attended the Morgan State University on a track scholarship.

He stands 6 ft 1 in (1.85 m) and during his Olympic competition he weighed 185 pounds (84 kg). At the 1991 World Championships, Pierce placed second behind Greg Foster, and at the 1992 Summer Olympics in Barcelona, Pierce finished third. Jack's personal best time was 12.94 seconds.

He was coached by Norman Tate, a former triple jumper who competed at the 1968 Mexico City Olympics.

Pierce and his family have been residents of Lumberton Township, New Jersey.
