= Chris Pressley =

American football player (born 1986)

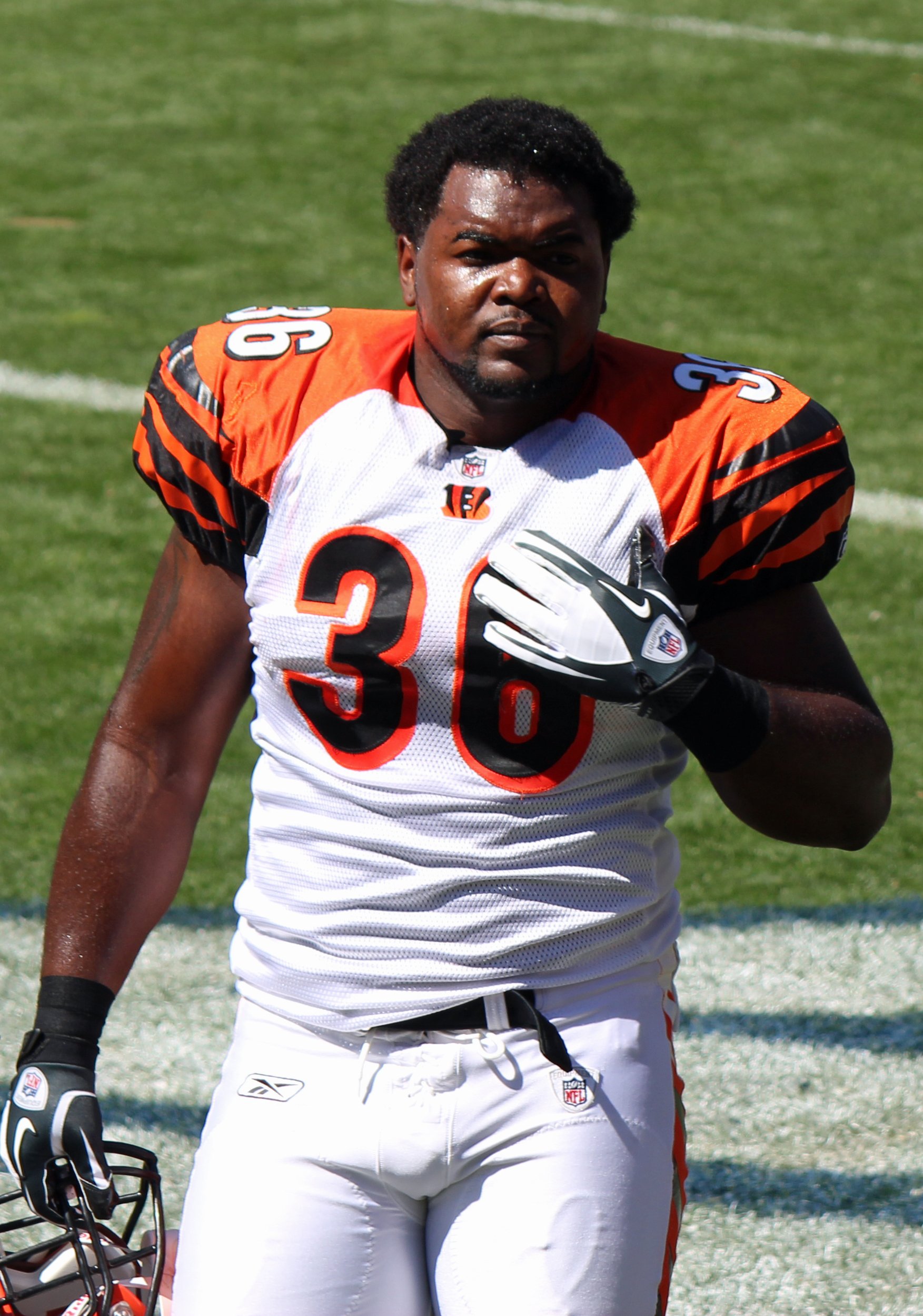
- Pressley with the Cincinnati Bengals in 2011

No. 45, 36
- Position: Fullback

Personal information
- Born: August 8, 1986 (age 40); Woodbury, New Jersey, U.S.
- Listed height: 5 ft 11 in (1.80 m)
- Listed weight: 257 lb (117 kg)

Career information
- High school: Woodbury
- College: Wisconsin
- NFL draft: 2009: undrafted

Career history
- Cincinnati Bengals (2009)*; Tampa Bay Buccaneers (2009–2010); Cincinnati Bengals (2010–2013); Cleveland Browns (2014)*
- * Offseason or practice squad member only

Career NFL statistics
- Receptions: 6
- Receiving yards: 28
- Receiving touchdowns: 1
- Stats at Pro Football Reference

Chris Pressley (born August 8, 1986) is an American former professional football player who was a fullback in the National Football League (NFL). He went undrafted in the 2009 NFL draft after playing college football for five years with the Wisconsin Badgers. Pressley's maximum back squat weight is 770 pounds (349 kg), and he has been videotaped squatting 605 pounds nine times in a row with no assistive equipment.

== Early life ==
Pressley, a 5'11", 260-pound fullback, was born and raised in Woodbury, New Jersey, just outside Philadelphia. He was selected as All-County, All-South Jersey and All-State during his senior year in 2003–04 while playing for Woodbury High School. His high school football coach was former Pittsburgh Steelers linebacker Zack Valentine, who won Super Bowl XIV as a member of the famous "Steel Curtain" defense.

== College career ==
From 2004 to 2009, Pressley played for the Badgers under head coaches Barry Alvarez (2004–05) and Bret Bielema (2005–09). A broken ankle just before the start of the 2005 season sidelined him for the year, so he used his redshirt eligibility and stayed for one extra season. Pressley's collegiate statistics were not outstanding, but his hard work ethic and willingness to sacrifice his body landed him on an NFL roster after going undrafted in 2009.

== Professional career ==
=== Cincinnati Bengals (first stint) ===
In 2009, Pressley was signed as an undrafted free agent by the Cincinnati Bengals. His attempt to make the Bengals' roster was chronicled on the HBO series Hard Knocks: Training Camp with the Cincinnati Bengals. Pressley failed to make the final cut, but was signed to the Bengals' practice squad after he cleared waivers.

=== Tampa Bay Buccaneers ===
On October 28, 2009, Pressley was signed off the Bengals' practice squad to the active roster of the Tampa Bay Buccaneers. On November 22, Pressley made his NFL regular season debut for the Buccaneers in a 38–7 loss to the New Orleans Saints. Pressley's first career carry came two weeks later on December 6 in a game against the Carolina Panthers. After starting the 2010 season with the Buccaneers and playing in three games, he was waived on October 23.

=== Cincinnati Bengals (second stint) ===
Cincinnati then re-signed him, and on December 10 was promoted to their roster after cornerback Rico Murray sustained an ankle injury.

Pressley started 10 games for the Bengals in 2011. In March 2012, he signed a two-year contract extension with the team. On September 30, 2012, Pressley scored his first career touchdown when he caught a 1-yard touchdown pass from Andy Dalton in a 27–10 win over the Jacksonville Jaguars.

Pressley was waived on December 10, 2013.

=== Cleveland Browns ===
Pressley was signed by the Cleveland Browns on April 14, 2014. He was released on May 19, 2014.
