= Nelson Jones =

American football player (born 1964)

Profile
- Position: Defensive back

Personal information
- Born: February 13, 1964 (age 62)
- Listed height: 6 ft 1 in (1.85 m)
- Listed weight: 194 lb (88 kg)

Career information
- High school: Woodbury (Woodbury, New Jersey)
- College: NC State
- NFL draft: 1987: 5th round, 115th overall pick

Career history
- San Diego Chargers (1987–1989)*
- * Offseason or practice squad member only

Nelson Jones (born February 13, 1964) is an American former professional football player for the San Diego Chargers in the late 1980s.

Pre-draft measurables
Height	Weight	Arm length	Hand span	40-yard dash	10-yard split	20-yard split	Bench press
6 ft 0 3/4 in (1.85 m)	194 lb (88 kg)	32 in (0.81 m)	9 1/2 in (0.24 m)	4.64 s	1.59 s	2.65 s	6 reps
All values from NFL Combine

He was selected by the Chargers in the fifth round of the 1987 NFL draft with the 115th overall pick. A native of Woodbury, New Jersey, he played college football at North Carolina State University.
