= Woodbury Junior-Senior High School =

High school in Gloucester County, New Jersey, US

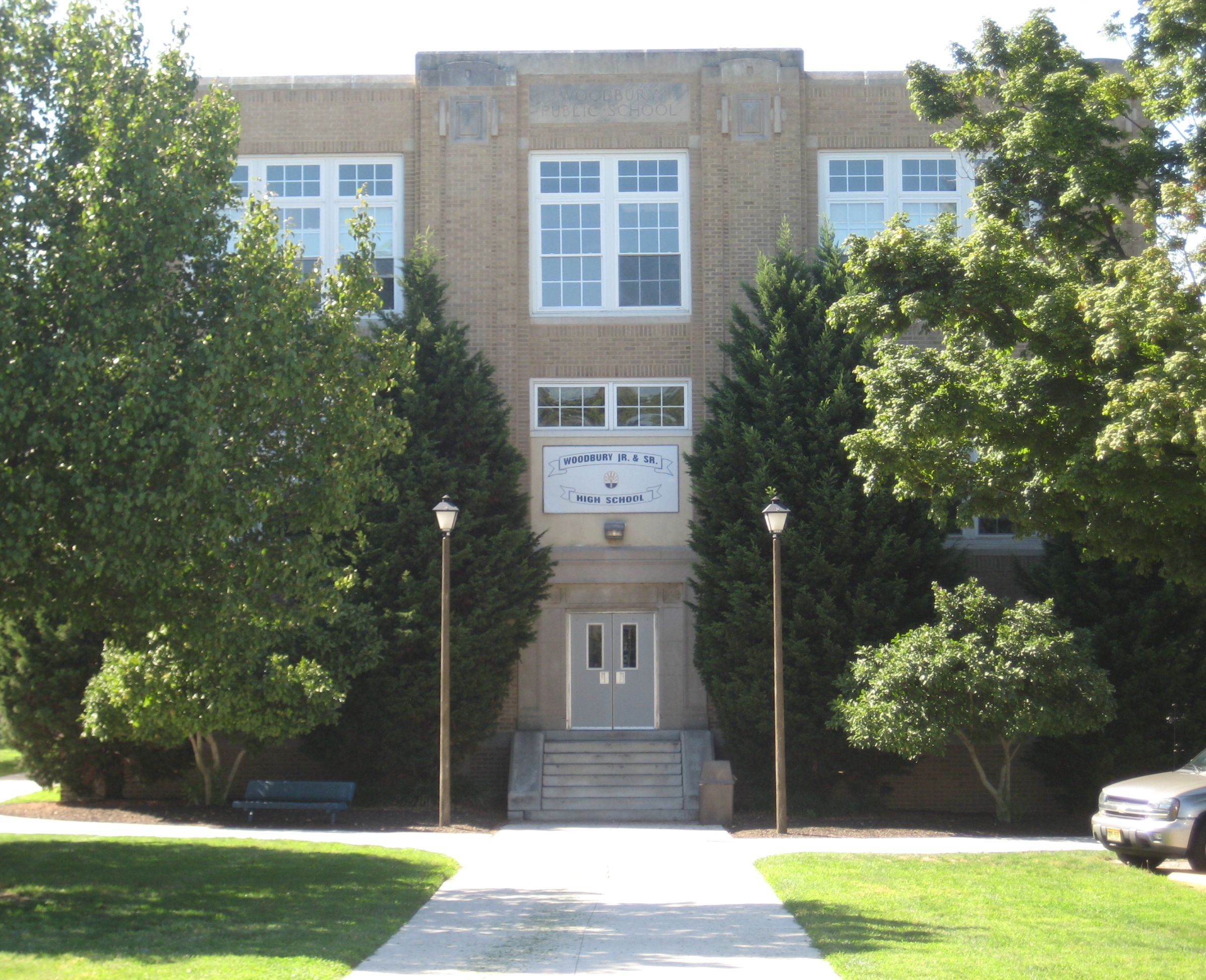
- Woodbury Junior-Senior High School in Woodbury, New Jersey

Location
- 25 North Broad Street; Woodbury, Gloucester County, New Jersey 08096; United States; 39.8399°N 75.1533°W

Information
- School type: Public high school
- Motto: "Excellence Through Tradition and Innovation"
- Founded: 1902
- School district: Woodbury Public Schools
- Superintendent: Andrew T. Bell Sr.
- CEEB code: 311635
- NCES School ID: 341815002688
- Principal: Dwayne S. Dobbins Jr. (grades 9-12); Mylisa Himmons (grades 6-8)
- Faculty: 70.0 FTEs
- Grades: 6–12
- Enrollment: 818 (as of 2024–25)
- Student to teacher ratio: 11.7:1
- Language: English
- Hours in school day: 6.5
- Colors: White and Gold
- Athletics conference: Colonial Conference (general); West Jersey Football League (football)
- Mascot: Bison
- Team name: Thundering Herd
- Rivals: Paulsboro HS; Gateway Regional HS
- Newspaper: White and Gold
- Yearbook: Sundial
- Communities served: Woodbury
- Former names: Woodbury Academy (1791–1864); Woodbury Free School (1864–1908); William Milligan High School (1908–1911)
- Website: hs.woodburysch.com

Woodbury Junior-Senior High School (WHS) is a comprehensive community middle school and public high school that serves students in sixth through twelfth grades from Woodbury, in Gloucester County, in the U.S. state of New Jersey, as part of the Woodbury Public Schools system. The class of 2003 was the school's 100th graduating class, making Woodbury High School one of the oldest secondary schools in South Jersey and the oldest in its athletic conference.

As of the 2024–25 school year, the school had an enrollment of 818 students and 70.0 classroom teachers (on an FTE basis), for a student–teacher ratio of 11.7:1. There were 546 students (66.7% of enrollment) eligible for free lunch and 39 (4.8% of students) eligible for reduced-cost lunch.

== History ==
After the original high school building was destroyed in a devastating fire on December 20, 1910, it was rebuilt in 1911 with then-governor and future president, Woodrow Wilson, laying the cornerstone for the new Woodbury High School. The new school building opened in 1912.

Students from National Park, Wenonah, Westville and Woodbury Heights had attended the school until the Gateway Regional High School opened in September 1964.

== Awards, recognition and rankings ==
In 2004, the school was selected as a NASA Explorer School, one of 50 in the entire country to work hand-in-hand with NASA on improving technology and science education within the school. In 2007, NASA selected Woodbury to experience a 'Weightless Wonder' flight on a C-9 aircraft so that they could test their proposed experiment examining the performance-related effects of reduced gravity on simple robotic designs.

The school was the 187th-ranked public high school in New Jersey out of 339 schools statewide in New Jersey Monthly magazine's September 2014 cover story on the state's "Top Public High Schools", using a new ranking methodology. The school had been ranked 192nd in the state of 328 schools in 2012, after being ranked 199th in 2010 out of 322 schools listed. The magazine ranked the school 203rd in 2008 out of 316 schools. The school was ranked 111th in the magazine's September 2006 issue. In 2006, Woodbury was the #1 ranked high school in Gloucester County by New Jersey Monthly and Philadelphia Magazine.

== Athletics ==
Woodbury High School Thundering Herd compete as the oldest member school in the Colonial Conference, which is comprised of small schools in Camden and Gloucester counties whose enrollments generally do not exceed between 850 students for grades 9–12, and operates under the supervision of the New Jersey State Interscholastic Athletic Association (NJSIAA). With 325 students in grades 10-12, the school was classified by the NJSIAA for the 2019–20 school year as Group I for most athletic competition purposes, which included schools with an enrollment of 75 to 476 students in that grade range. The football team competes in the Diamond Division of the 94-team West Jersey Football League superconference and was classified by the NJSIAA as Group I South for football for 2024–2026, which included schools with 185 to 482 students.

The school participates in joint cooperative cross country running (expiring in June 2028), co-ed swimming (June 2028) and wrestling teams (June 2029) with Gateway Regional High School as the host school / lead agency.

The boys' track team won the Group III spring / outdoor track state championship in 1943 and 1948, and won the Group I title in 1969, 1972-1978, 2010 and 2011. The program's 11 group titles are tied for fourth-most in the state; the program's streak of seven consecutive titles from 1972 to 1978 is tied for the second-longest streak in the state.

The boys' track team won the indoor relay championship in Group I in 1976-1979 and 1983; the program's five state group titles are tied for tenth-most in the state and the four consecutive titles from 1976 to 1979 is tied for the fifth-longest streak. The girls team won the Group III title in 1982 and 1986

The girls' team won the NJSIAA spring / outdoor track Group I state championship in 1976, 1977, 1979 and 2007.

The softball team won the Group I state championship in 1983 (defeating Wood-Ridge High School in the tournament final) and 1996 (vs. Cedar Grove High School). The 1996 Group I state final was ended in five innings due to the mercy rule, with a 16–1 win against Cedar Grove giving the team a 23–1 record for the season.

The boys' tennis team won the 2005 South, Group I state sectional championship with a 3–2 win over Schalick High School. In 2007, the girls' track & field team won the NJSIAA Group I state championship, and the boys' track & field team came in second in the state, losing by a single point to Metuchen.

The football team won the NJSIAA South Jersey Group I state sectional championship in 1988-1991, 1998 and 2009. In 1988, the team finished its first undefeated season capped off by a 32–6 win against Paulsboro High School in the South Jersey Group I sectional championship game, finishing the season at 11–0. The 1989 team won the South Jersey Group I title with a 27–20 win against Paulsboro in the championship game to run their season record to 11–0 for the second consecutive year, becoming the second South Jersey team to accomplish this feat. The annual Thanksgiving Day rivalry football game is against Gateway High School. In addition to its longstanding regular-season rivalry that dates back to 1915, Woodbury has defeated Paulsboro in the South Jersey Group I final in 1988, 1989 and 2009 (by a score of 16-0). Paulsboro has an overall record of 59–43–3 in matchups between the two teams, which was ranked 20th by NJ.com on its 2017 list "Ranking the 31 fiercest rivalries in N.J. HS football".

The boys' basketball team won the Group I state championship in 2018, defeating Cresskill High School by a score of 60–58 in the tournament final.

=== Sports offered ===
Boys – soccer, football, cross country, basketball, indoor track, swimming, track & field, baseball, wrestling
Girls – soccer, cross country, field hockey, cheerleading, basketball, indoor track, swimming, track & field, softball

=== 1952–53: Year of Champions ===
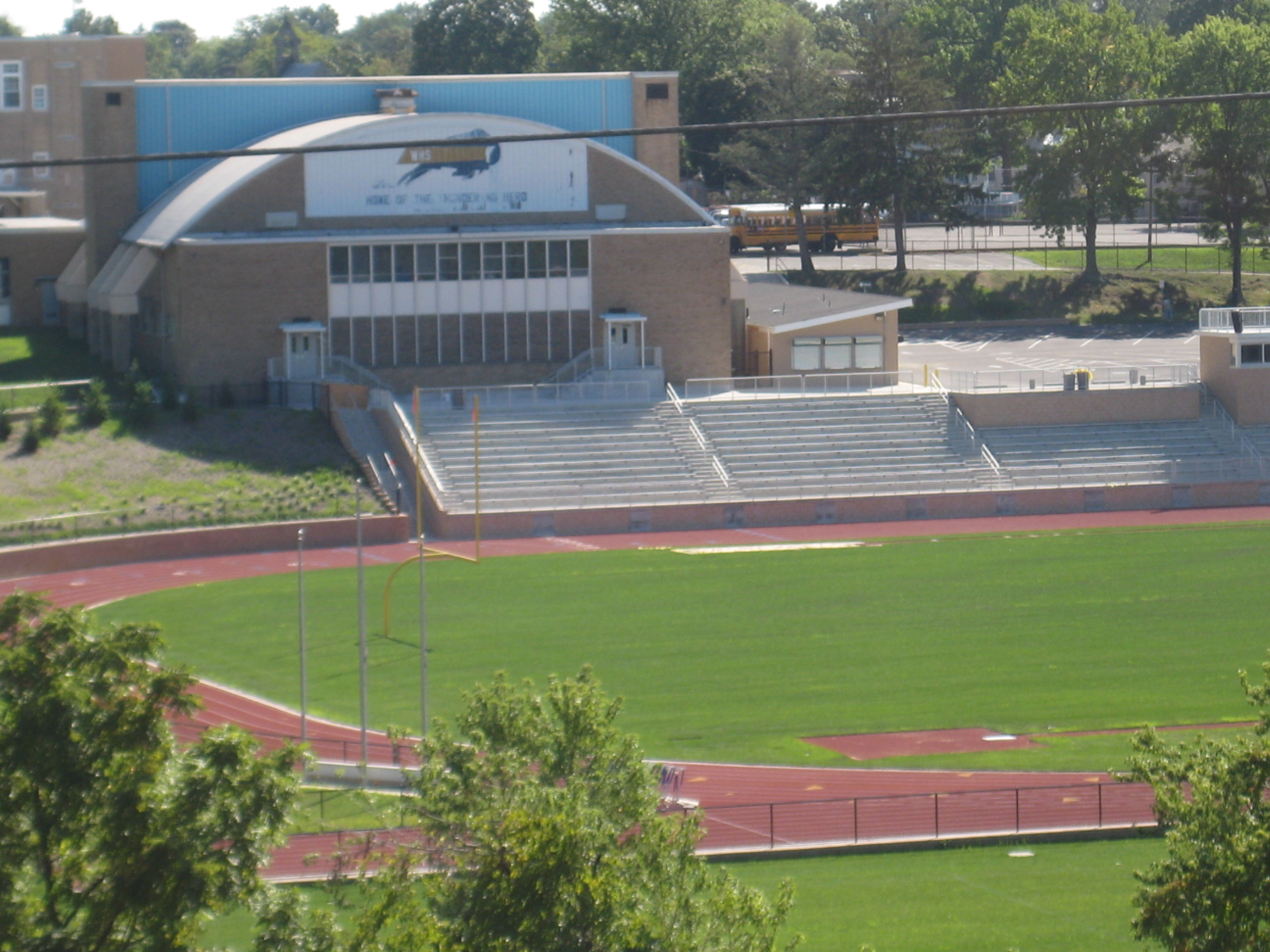
Woodbury High School football stadium

Led by future NFL quarterback Milt Plum, Woodbury High School had one of the most historic school years for a sports program in United States history in 1952–53. Every single athletic team, boys or girls, either tied for or won outright titles. All sports teams combined produced an overall record of 75–13–1 (.842 win percentage) with 10 championships. At the time, Woodbury was classified as a Group III regional high school and was much bigger than its small Group I classification today. The championships won during 1952–53 are:

- Colonial Conference titles

- Baseball (14–2–1)
- Football (8–0)
- Boys' basketball (16–6)
- Track (5–2)

- South Jersey Group III titles

- Cross Country (7–0)
- Football

- West Jersey League championships

- Field Hockey (7–3)
- Girls' tennis (8–0)
- Girls' basketball (10–0)

- State championships

- Track – Group III Medley Relay

=== Academic excellence off the field ===
The boys' soccer team has earned the National Soccer Coaches Association of America's High School Boys Team Academic Award for seven consecutive seasons (2003–04 through 2010–11). To qualify for the award, the team must have a minimum grade point average of 3.25 for the entire academic year. The team GPA is determined by adding every player's GPA, then dividing by the number of players. Woodbury is one of only two boys' soccer teams in all of New Jersey to be recognized in each of the past seven years (Sparta High School is the other). For the 2006–07 award, Woodbury was one of only 61 schools in the nation to receive this honor for both its boys' and girls' teams.

=== Snapping 'the streak' ===
Woodbury High School is responsible for halting the longest winning streak in New Jersey football history. Longtime rival Paulsboro High School had recorded 63 consecutive wins over the span of six years (1992–1998), but on September 26, 1998, Paulsboro lost to Woodbury, 14–13. The 63 wins still holds as the record to this day.

=== First-ever NJSIAA public school football state champion ===
In 2022, the NJSIAA re-organized the playoff system used to determine football state champions. There had never been a statewide tournament to determine an overall state champion; prior to 2022, all sectional champions were declared de facto state champions, since teams from different areas of the state never played one another. Woodbury High School won the 2022 South Jersey Group I sectional championship over Salem High School, then defeated Mountain Lakes High School 31–7 in the NJSIAA Group I state title game. Woodbury took home the first golden trophy ever awarded to a public football program in New Jersey prep history.

== Administration ==
The school's acting co-principals are Dwayne S. Dobbins Jr. for grades 9-12 and Mylisa Himmons for grades 6-8.

== Popular culture ==
=== Super Bowl connection ===
When former Thundering Herd head football coach Jim Boyd stepped down after the 2000 season, then-assistant coach Zack Valentine was promoted to become the newest head coach. Valentine is a Super Bowl-winning linebacker who played for the National Football League's Pittsburgh Steelers from 1979 to 1981 as a member of the "Steel Curtain" defense. He began his career in the Woodbury school system in 1995 as a substitute teacher, and then in 1998 became a full-time physical education teacher. Valentine also played for the Philadelphia Eagles briefly before an injury prematurely ended his career.

=== 1987 Philadelphia Eagles training camp ===
The high school's football stadium was used by the NFL's Philadelphia Eagles in 1987 as the home of their training camp. The school district had given permission to the Eagles to utilize their field. All-time NFL greats Seth Joyner and Reggie White were among those on the 1987 roster who practiced at Woodbury High School.

=== Filming location ===
In October 2000, an independent mockumentary movie, Bottomfeeder_schools, filmed scenes in front of the high school's main entrance for a presidential candidate's speech. Local residents and students were used as the rallying crowd who supported the candidate.

== Notable people ==
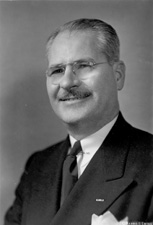
Robert Hendrickson (Class of 1918)

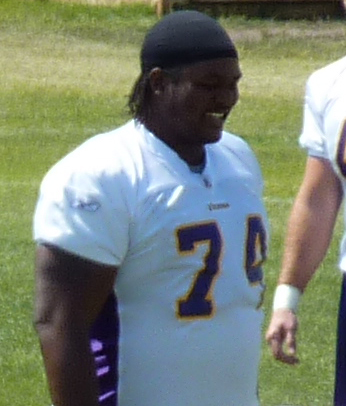
Bryant McKinnie (Class of 1996)

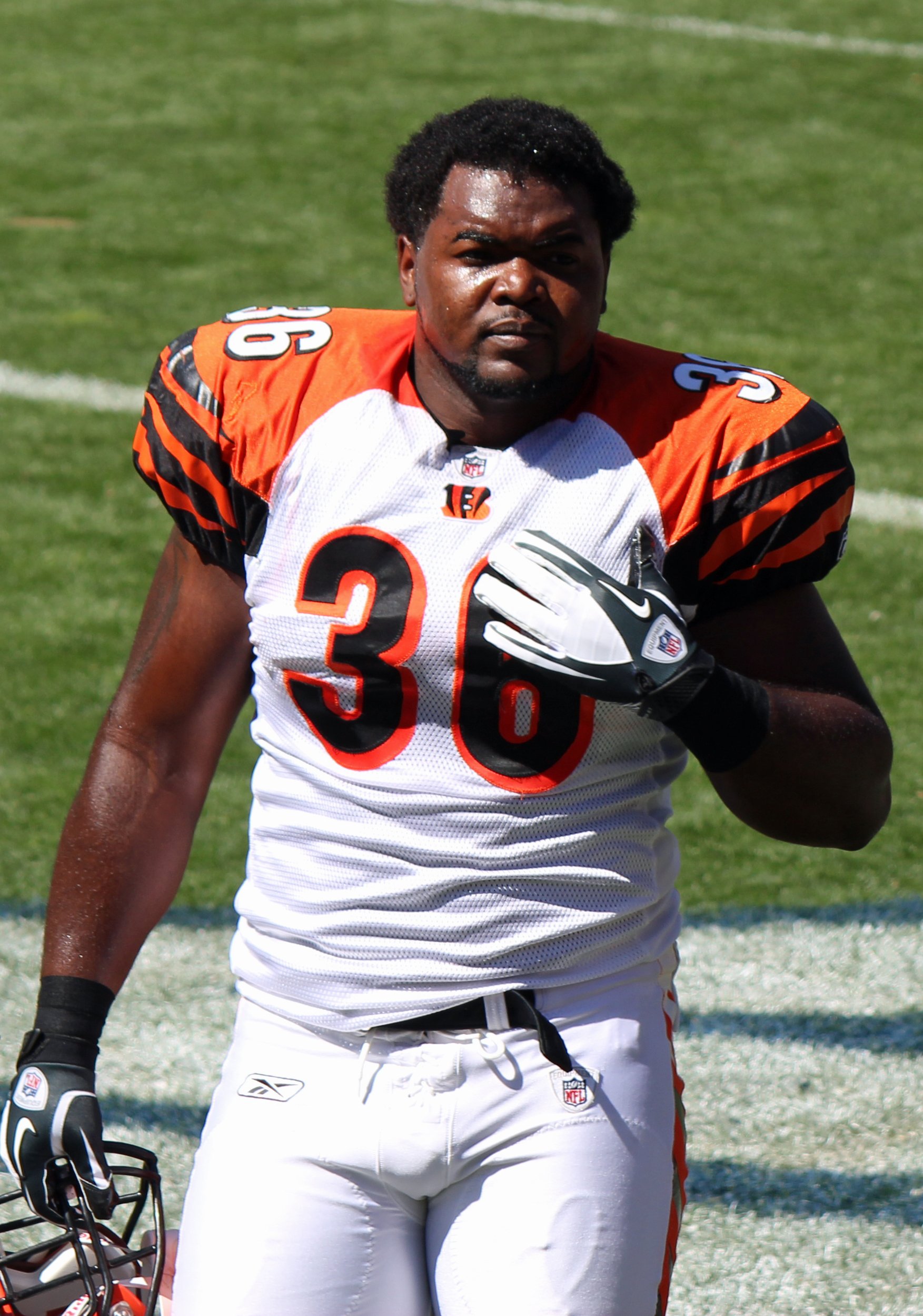
Chris Pressley (Class of 2004)

=== Alumni ===
- Anthony Averett (born 1994; class of 2013), cornerback for the Alabama Crimson Tide football team and the Baltimore Ravens. He is a two-time college football national champion
- George Benjamin Jr. (1919–1944; class of 1937), a United States Army soldier and a posthumous recipient of the U.S. military's highest decoration, the Medal of Honor, for his actions during the Philippines campaign of World War II
- Carroll William "Boardwalk" Brown (1889–1977), Major League Baseball pitcher for the Philadelphia Athletics and New York Yankees
- Roscoe Lee Browne (1922–2007, class of 1939), actor and director, known for his rich voice and dignified bearing
- Ted Browne (c. 1914–2002; class of 1936), college football coach and athletics administrator
- Dave Budd (born 1938; class of 1956), power forward for the New York Knicks who also shared responsibility in guarding Wilt Chamberlain during his 100-point NBA game
- Stephen Decatur (1779–1820), a naval officer notable for his heroism in the First Barbary War and the Second Barbary War and in the War of 1812.
- Aaron Estrada (born 2001; transferred out after junior year), standout college basketball player who is a two-time Colonial Athletic Association Player of the Year (2022, 2023)
- Oscar Fraley (1914–1994; class of 1934), co-author, with Eliot Ness, of The Untouchables which sold 1.5 million copies
- Harold W. Hannold (1911–1995), politician who served in the New Jersey Senate from 1945 to 1959, serving as Senate President in 1952
- Robert C. Hendrickson (1898–1964; class of 1918), a United States Senator from 1949 to 1955
- Leon Johnson (1902 –?), American football player who played for the Orange Tornadoes
- Nelson Jones (born 1964; class of 1982), football player for the San Diego Chargers
- James Lawrence (1781–1813), an American naval officer of "Don't give up the ship!" fame.
- Rebekah Marine (born 1987; class of 2005), model and motivational speaker who is a congenital amputee and was born without a right forearm
- Mike McBath (born 1946; class of 1964), defensive end for the Buffalo Bills from 1968 to 1973, part-owner Orlando Predators
- Bryant McKinnie (born 1979; class of 1996), an offensive lineman in the National Football League for the Baltimore Ravens
- Jack Pierce (born 1962; class of 1980), Olympic bronze medalist in the 110 meter high hurdles at the 1992 Olympic Games
- Milt Plum (born 1935; class of 1953), quarterback and two-time Pro Bowler for the Cleveland Browns
- Chris Pressley (born 1986; class of 2004), fullback for the Cincinnati Bengals
- Browning Ross (1924–1998; class of 1943), a two-time Olympian in long-distance running (1948, 1952)
- Helen Sommers (1932–2017), politician who served in the Washington House of Representatives from 1972 to 2009, where she represented Washington's 36th legislative district
- Al Szolack (born c. 1950, class of 1968), a member of the Washington Generals traveling basketball team, opponents of the Harlem Globetrotters, during the 1974–75 season
- Raymond Zane (1939–2024), politician who represented the 3rd Legislative District in the New Jersey Senate from 1974 to 2002

=== Notable faculty ===
- Joe Colone (1926–2009), former NBA player for the New York Knicks
- Zack Valentine (born 1957), former NFL player and Super Bowl-winner for the Pittsburgh Steelers who had a record of 82–37 at Woodbury, recording the second most wins by a head coach, and won three state sectional titles.

== School programs ==
Extracurricular activities (other than sports) that are offered at Woodbury Junior-Senior High School include, but are not limited to, the Alternative Power Program, Junior & Senior High School Yearbooks, National Honor Society, Theater Club, Video Tape/A.V. Club, White & Gold newsletter, Choir, Orchestra Band, Marching Band, Jazz Band, Key Club, Interact Club, Bowling Club, Ladybug Club, Math and Science Leagues, Academic Bowl, French Club, Outdoor Club, peer mentoring program, Boys/Girls State, Governor's School, Gay and Lesbian Alliance, and a Student Council.

== Notes ==
- ^a The modern day Woodbury High School was established in 1902 and is usually recognized as that year. However, the precursor schools that evolved into WHS were actually established in 1791.
- ^b Blue is not an official color; only white and gold are the official colors of Woodbury High School. The color blue is often partnered with gold for the school's athletic teams' uniforms, thus it is often confused to be blue and gold instead of white and gold.
- ^c Due to small enrollment and the inability to field full teams themselves, the cross country, swimming, and wrestling teams have combined with Gateway Regional High School to form a Woodbury/Gateway athletic partnership.
- ^d To put the championships into perspective, in the early 1950s there were far fewer sports to participate in at the high school level, and Title IX would not occur for 20 more years.
- ^e The field hockey team was tied with two other schools as three-way co-champions.
- ^f Decatur and Lawrence attended the Woodbury Academy, which was built in the 18th century and is the precursor to the present day school.
