= Boardwalk Brown =

American baseball player (1889-1977)

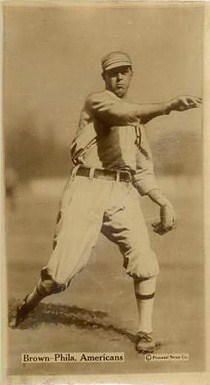
- Pitcher
- Born: February 20, 1889; Woodbury, New Jersey, U.S.
- Died: February 8, 1977 (aged 87); Burlington, New Jersey, U.S.
- Batted: Right Threw: Right

MLB debut
- September 27, 1911, for the Philadelphia Athletics

Last MLB appearance
- October 7, 1915, for the New York Yankees

MLB statistics
- Win–loss record: 38–40
- Earned run average: 3.47
- Strikeouts: 251
- Stats at Baseball Reference

Teams
- Philadelphia Athletics (1911–1914); New York Yankees (1914–1915)

Career highlights and awards
- World Series champion (1913)

Carroll William "Boardwalk" Brown (February 20, 1889 – February 8, 1977) was an American Major League Baseball pitcher. He was born on February 20, 1889, in Woodbury, New Jersey, and attended Woodbury Junior-Senior High School. He batted and threw right-handed, and was 178 pounds. Boardwalk played three seasons with the Philadelphia Athletics in 1911–1913. In 1914 he played for both the A's and the New York Yankees and again in 1915 with the Yankees. In his career, Brown had a 38–40 record in 133 games with an ERA of 3.47 and 251 strikeouts.

After baseball, Brown served as a builder and contractor living in Pleasantville, New Jersey. Brown died on February 8, 1977 at a Masonic Home in Burlington, New Jersey. He was buried at the Laurel Memorial Park in Pomona, New Jersey.
