= George Benjamin (Orangeman) =

Canadian political figure

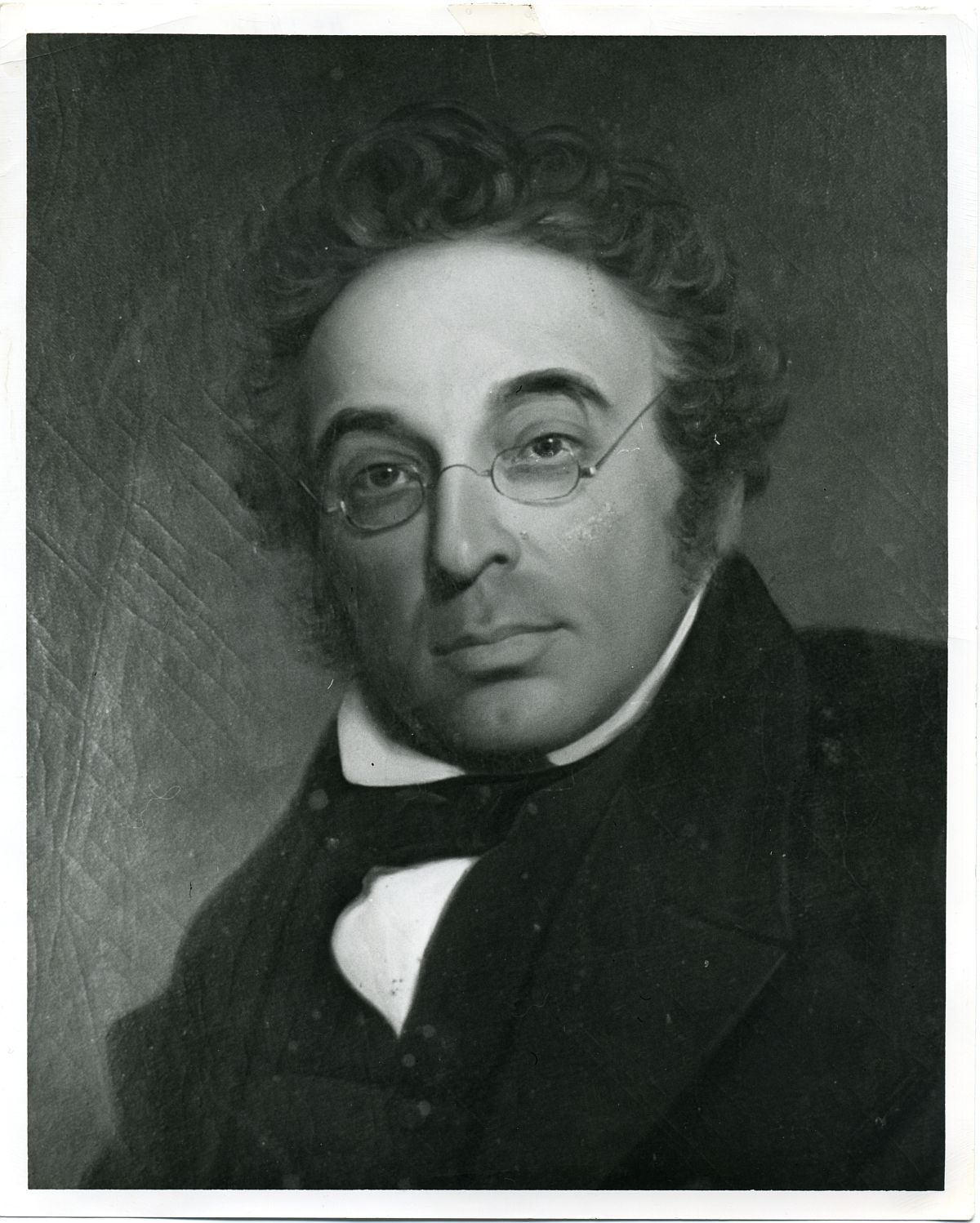
- 1857 portrait of George Benjamin

Member of the Legislative Assembly of the Province of Canada
- In office 1856–1864
- Constituency: North Hastings

Personal details
- Born: 15 April 1799 Sussex, England
- Died: 7 September 1864 (aged 65) Belleville, Ontario, Canada
- Party: Tory
- Occupation: Journalist, politician
- Known for: First Jewish person elected to a Canadian parliament

George Benjamin (15 April 1799 – 7 September 1864), born Moses Cohen, was an Orangeman and political figure in Upper Canada.

== Background and early career ==
Born in Sussex, England to a Jewish family, he worked for a time as a journalist before emigrating to the United States. In 1834, he arrived in Belleville, Upper Canada, where he established a Tory newspaper, named The Belleville Intelligencer.

== Orange Order activities ==
He became a Captain in the local militia and a member of the Orange Order in later years. He helped finance the building of a plank road between Belleville and Camden. He served as warden for Hastings County from 1847 to 1862.

Though he was Jewish, in 1836 he became grand master in British North America for the Orange Order, replacing Ogle Robert Gowan. At this time, the Orange Order had a strong voice in Upper Canada. Gowan's attempt to regain control of the Order in 1853 led to a split in the organization which was only healed in 1856 when both he and Benjamin withdrew from the leadership.

Benjamin had many political enemies and was the subject of a harsh caricature in Susanna Moodie's 1843 short story "Richard Redpath".

== Elected to Parliament ==
In an 1856 by-election, he was elected to represent North Hastings in the Legislative Assembly, becoming the first Jew elected to a Canadian parliament. He was re-elected in 1857.

== Death ==
Benjamin died in Belleville in 1864 after a prolonged illness.
