= George Benjamin Jr. =

United States Army Medal of Honor recipient (1919–1944)

- Born: April 24, 1919; Philadelphia, Pennsylvania
- Died: December 22, 1944 (aged 25); Leyte, Philippines
- Burial place: Manila American Cemetery and Memorial, Manila, Philippine Islands
- Military career
- Allegiance: United States of America
- Branch: United States Army
- Service years: 1943 - 1944
- Rank: Private First Class
- Units: 306th Infantry Regiment, 77th Infantry Division
- Conflicts: World War II: Philippines campaign; Battle of Leyte (DOW)
- Awards: Medal of Honor; Purple Heart

George Benjamin Jr. (April 24, 1919 – December 22, 1944) was a United States Army soldier and a posthumous recipient of the U.S. military's highest decoration, the Medal of Honor, for his actions during the Philippines campaign of World War II.

== Biography ==
Benjamin was born in Philadelphia, and later moved to New Jersey. After graduating from Woodbury High School in Woodbury, New Jersey, he joined the Army from nearby Carneys Point in August 1943.

By December 21, 1944, Benjamin was serving in the Philippines as a private first class with Company A of the 306th Infantry Regiment, 77th Infantry Division. On that day, he was severely wounded while leading an assault against a strongly defended Japanese position on the island of Leyte. After being evacuated to an aid station, he conveyed valuable information regarding the disposition of the Japanese emplacement to his superiors. He died of his wounds the next day. For these actions, he was posthumously awarded the Medal of Honor six months later, on June 28, 1945. He is one of only two Medal of Honor recipients from Gloucester County, New Jersey.

Aged 25 at his death, Benjamin was buried at the Manila American Cemetery and Memorial in the Philippines.

On July 4, 1995, to celebrate the 50th anniversary of the end of World War II, a memorial was erected in Woodbury, New Jersey, Benjamin's home town. It was also during this date that the George Benjamin Jr. Memorial 5K was inaugurated.

== Medal of Honor citation ==
Benjamin, George
Rank and organization: Private First Class, U.S. Army, Company A, 306th Infantry, 77th Infantry Division
Place and date: Leyte, Philippine Islands, December 21, 1944
Entered service at: Carneys Point, New Jersey
Born: Philadelphia, PA
Citation:

He was a radio operator, advancing in the rear of his company as it engaged a well-defended Japanese strong point holding up the progress of the entire battalion. When a rifle platoon supporting a light tank hesitated in its advance, he voluntarily and with utter disregard for personal safety left his comparatively secure position and ran across bullet-whipped terrain to the tank, waving and shouting to the men of the platoon to follow. Carrying his bulky radio and armed only with a pistol, he fearlessly penetrated intense machinegun and rifle fire to the enemy position, where he killed 1 of the enemy in a foxhole and moved on to annihilate the crew of a light machinegun. Heedless of the terrific fire now concentrated on him, he continued to spearhead the assault, killing 2 more of the enemy and exhorting the other men to advance, until he fell mortally wounded. After being evacuated to an aid station, his first thought was still of the American advance. Overcoming great pain he called for the battalion operations officer to report the location of enemy weapons and valuable tactical information he had secured in his heroic charge. The unwavering courage, the unswerving devotion to the task at hand, the aggressive leadership of Pfc. Benjamin were a source of great and lasting inspiration to his comrades and were to a great extent responsible for the success of the battalion's mission.

== See also ==
- List of Medal of Honor recipients for World War II
