= Colonial Conference (New Jersey) =

New Jersey high school sports league

The Colonial Conference is an athletic conference consisting of public high schools located in Camden County and Gloucester County, New Jersey, United States. The Colonial Conference operates under the aegis of the New Jersey State Interscholastic Athletic Association. It was first established in 1945, and today it is composed of two divisions: Patriot and Liberty.

== History ==
For the 2020-21 school year, Overbrook High School returned to the Tri-County Conference, after being a member of the Colonial Conference from 2008 to 2020. Gloucester City Junior-Senior High School left the Tri-County Conference and took the spot left vacant by Overbrook.

== Participating schools ==
High school locations of Colonial Conference members

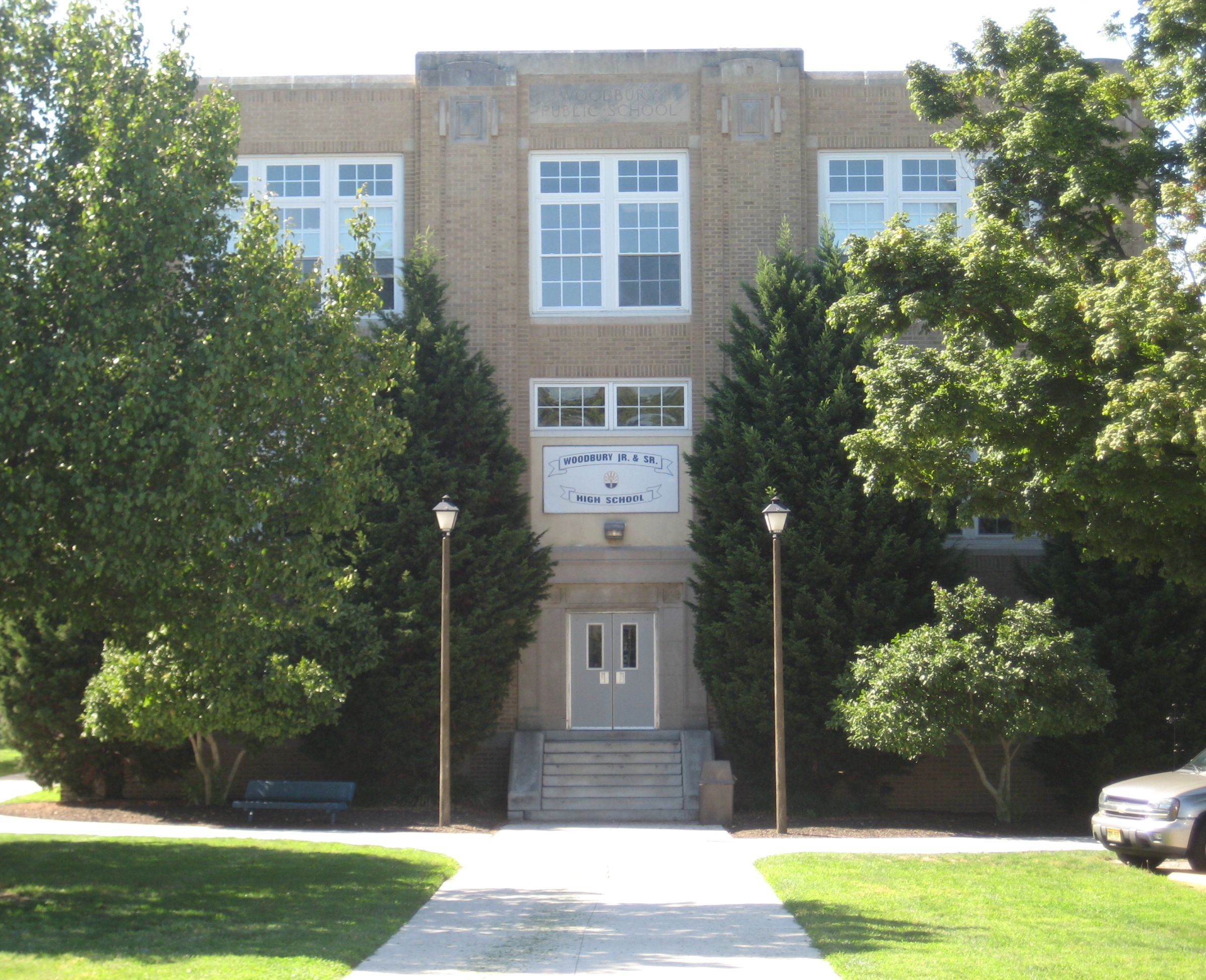
Woodbury High School has the smallest student body population in the conference

School	Location	School District	Team Name	Classification
Liberty Division
Collingswood High School	Collingswood	Collingswood Public Schools	Panthers	Group II
Gloucester City High School	Gloucester City	Gloucester City Public Schools	Lions	Group II
Haddon Heights High School	Haddon Heights	Haddon Heights School District	Garnets	Group II
Haddonfield Memorial High School	Haddonfield	Haddonfield Public Schools	Bulldawgs	Group II
Sterling High School	Somerdale		Silver Knights	Group II
West Deptford High School	West Deptford Township	West Deptford Public Schools	Eagles	Group II
Patriot Division
Audubon High School	Audubon	Audubon School District	Green Wave	Group II
Gateway Regional High School	Woodbury Heights		Gators	Group I
Haddon Township High School	Haddon Township	Haddon Township School District	Hawks	Group I
Lindenwold High School	Lindenwold	Lindenwold Public Schools	Lions	Group I
Paulsboro High School	Paulsboro	Paulsboro Public Schools	Red Raiders	Group I
Woodbury Junior-Senior High School	Woodbury	Woodbury Public Schools	Thundering Herd	Group I
