= Paulsboro High School =

High school in Gloucester County, New Jersey, US

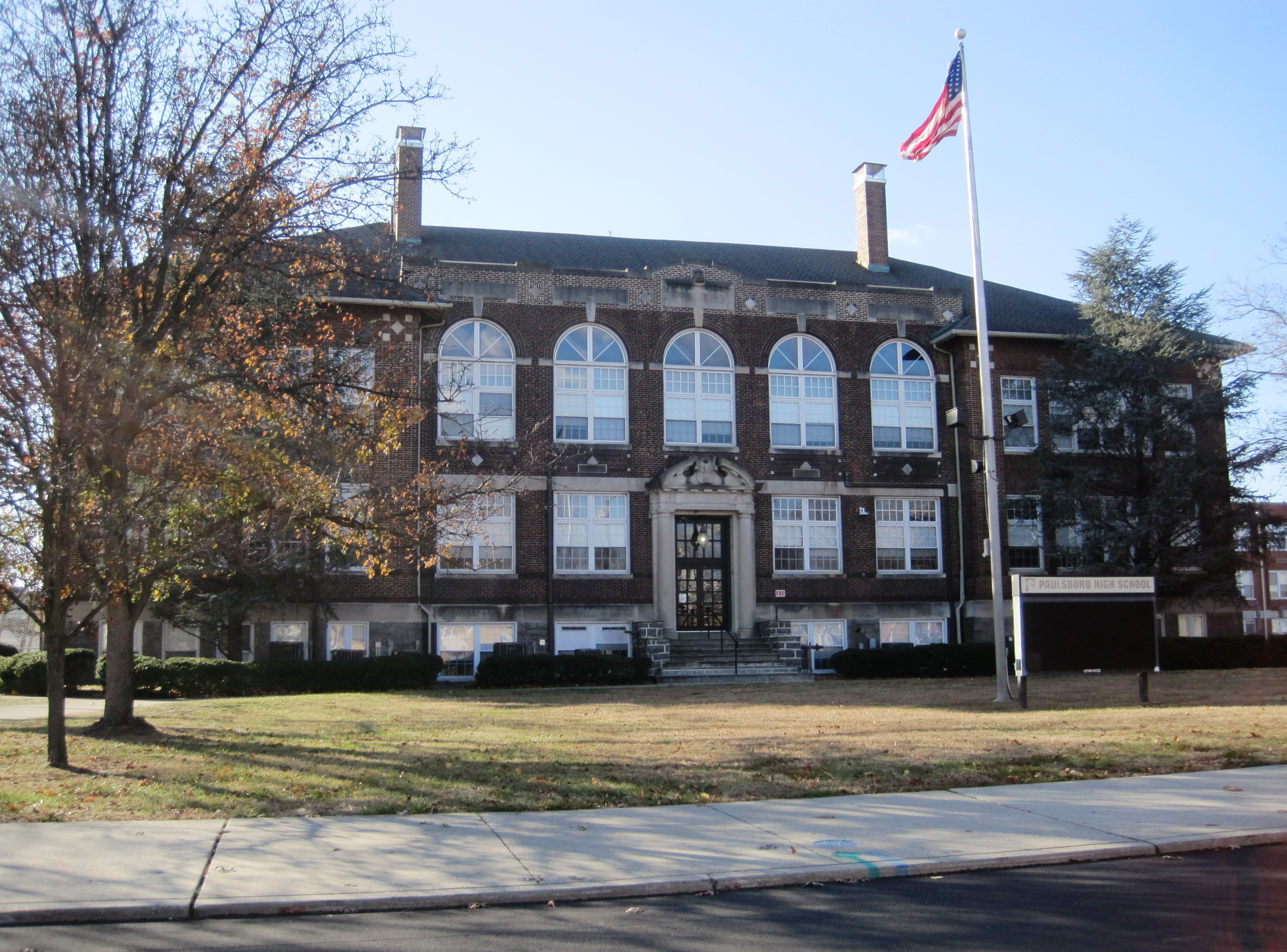
- Front of the school

Location
- 670 North Delaware Street; Paulsboro, Gloucester County, New Jersey 08066; United States
- 39.837032°N 75.243921°W

Information
- Type: Public high school
- Established: 1907
- NCES School ID: 341272002608
- Principal: Matthew Browne
- Faculty: 31.6 FTEs
- Enrollment: 425 (as of 2023–24)
- Student to teacher ratio: 13.5:1
- Colors: Red and white
- Athletics conference: Colonial Conference (general); West Jersey Football League (football)
- Team name: Red Raiders
- Rivals: Woodbury High School; West Deptford High School
- Website: phs.paulsboro.k12.nj.us

Paulsboro High School is a comprehensive community six-year public high school that serves students in seventh through twelfth grade from Paulsboro, in Gloucester County, in the U.S. state of New Jersey. It is the sole secondary school of the Paulsboro Public Schools.

As of the 2023–24 school year, the school had an enrollment of 425 students and 31.6 classroom teachers (on an FTE basis), for a student–teacher ratio of 13.5:1. There were 181 students (42.6% of enrollment) eligible for free lunch and 18 (4.2% of students) eligible for reduced-cost lunch.

Students in grades 9-12 from Greenwich Township attend Paulsboro High School as part of a sending/receiving relationship with the Greenwich Township School District.

== History ==
The district's first high school program began in 1907. Paulsboro High School was dedicated in May 1917 and constructed at a cost of $60,000 (equivalent to $1,500,000 in 2025).

== Awards, recognition and rankings ==
The school was the 309th-ranked public high school in New Jersey out of 339 schools statewide in New Jersey Monthly magazine's September 2014 cover story on the state's "Top Public High Schools", using a new ranking methodology. The school had been ranked 278th in the state of 328 schools in 2012, after being ranked 265th in 2010 out of 322 schools listed. The magazine ranked the school 277th in 2008 out of 316 schools. The school was ranked 264th in the magazine's September 2006 issue, which surveyed 316 schools across the state.

== Athletics ==
The Paulsboro High School Red Raiders compete as a member school in the Colonial Conference, which is comprised of small schools in Camden and Gloucester counties whose enrollments generally do not exceed between 750 and 800 students for grades 9–12, and operates under the supervision of the New Jersey State Interscholastic Athletic Association (NJSIAA). With 286 students in grades 10–12, the school was classified by the NJSIAA for the 2022–24 school years as Group I South for most athletic competition purposes. The football team competes in the Diamond Division of the 94-team West Jersey Football League superconference and was classified by the NJSIAA as Group I South for football for 2024–2026, which included schools with 185 to 482 students.

The football team won the South Jersey Group I state sectional championship in 1979, 1980, 1982, 1984, 1986, 1992–1997, 2000–2002, 2005, 2006, 2014, 2016 and 2017. The 1980 team won the South Jersey Group I state sectional title with a 16–6 victory against Glassboro High School to finish the season at 9–2. The 1984 team used a touchdown pass in the last minute of play to win the South Jersey Group I championship game by a score of 34–26 to finish the season with a record of 9-1-1. The 1984 team beat Glassboro 40–8 in front of 4,000 spectators to win the South Jersey Group I state title. The 1986 team finished the season with a 10–1 record after winning the South Jersey Group I state sectional title with a 10–0 win against Haddonfield Memorial High School in the championship game, avenging the team's only loss in the regular season. With their quarterback setting state records for career points and touchdowns scored. the 1995 team won the program's fourth consecutive South Jersey Group I title with a 50–0 win against Gloucester City High School in the playoff finals to run their record to 11–0. In 2000, the team finished the season 11–0, defeating previously unbeaten Glassboro High School by a score of 21–15 in the finals to win the South Jersey Group I title. The 2001 team finished the season 12-0 after winning the South Jersey Group I state sectional title with a 55–6 win against Gloucester City in the tournament final. In 2016, the team won the 18th sectional title in program history, defeating Salem High School by a score of 29–26 in the South Jersey Group I state sectional tournament final. The 2017 team won the program's 19th overall championship, its third title in four seasons and finished the year with a 10–2 record, defeating Penns Grove High School by a score of 34–24 in the playoff final of the South Jersey Group I state sectional tournament. NJ.com listed the rivalry between Paulsboro and Woodbury High School at number 20 in their 2017 list "Ranking the 31 fiercest rivalries in N.J. HS football", with Paulsboro leading the series between the two teams with a 56-43-3 record. Head coach Glenn Howard entered the 2020 season with 15 sectional championships and an overall career record of 300–68 in his 34 years leading the team, ranked fourth in wins among all active football coaches. Longtime assistant coach Kevin Harvey was named to replace Glenn Howard after his retirement in 2022.

The boys' basketball team won the Group I state championship in 1996 (defeating Science Park High School in the final game of the tournament) and 2015 (vs. University High School). The 1996 team won the Group I state title with a 53–51 win against Science Park of Newark in the championship game played at the Rutgers Athletic Center.

The boys track team won the Group I spring / outdoor track state championship in 1998.

The girls' outdoor track and field team won the Group I state championship in 2004 and 2019.

The boys tennis team won the Group I state championship in 2019, defeating runner-up Malcolm X Shabazz High School in the final match of the tournament.

=== Wrestling dynasty ===
The wrestling team won the South Jersey Group I state sectional championship every year from 1980 to 2007 and from 2009 to 2014, and won the Group I state championship from 1983 to 2007, 2009-2011 and 2016–2020; the 44 sectional titles, 34 group championships and the 25 consecutive group titles are the most of any school in the state through the conclusion of the 2024 season. As of the 2019 season, head coach Paul Morina won his 700th match, becoming the second coach in state history to reach that milestone. Morina reached his 606th victory as coach with a win against Haddonfield Memorial High School in January 2015, breaking the South Jersey record; From the time he became coach until he set the win record, Morina had won 28 sectional titles and went on to win 25 group championships.

==== 1,000 wins ====
On February 2, 2011, Paulsboro became just the third high school in history to accumulate 1,000 wins. It joined Granite City High School (Granite City, Illinois) and Vacaville High School (Vacaville, California) in the 1,000-win club.

==== 37-year conference unbeaten streak ====
Paulsboro High School's wrestling team had a streak of 307 consecutive victories against Colonial Conference opponents. The streak started in 1971 when Haddon Township High School had handed them their last conference loss. It would be nearly four decades until Collingswood High School was responsible for halting the streak on January 16, 2008, with a 28–22 decision over the Red Raiders. Paulsboro had won 25 consecutive state championships in Group I until 2008 when they lost early in the state tournament. According to the National Federation of State High School Associations, that streak was the longest in the entire nation at the time, and only three other teams have won more state championships overall than Paulsboro.

=== 'The Streak' ===
Paulsboro High School owns the New Jersey state record for consecutive football victories with 63 running from 1992 and until September 26, 1998, when they lost to longtime rival Woodbury High School by a score of 14–13. The 63 consecutive wins is still the state record, surpassing the next closest streak in South Jersey by 20 games, and besting the previous state record holder by nine.

== Controversy ==
Principal Lucia Pollino was suspended after an incident in which three students were allegedly strip searched while on a senior trip to Walt Disney World in April 2007. A lawsuit was filed by an attorney representing one of the students asking for $250,000 in damages related to the incident. Superintendent of Schools Frank Scambia said that Pollino would be reassigned to become director of assessments, a position for which she would be compensated with the same salary she had received as principal. The district reached a settlement with Pollino after she sued the district, charging that she had been the victim of gender discrimination and that she had never approved the strip search.

== Popular culture ==
A special premiere of the 2004 Kevin Smith film Jersey Girl was held at the school, which had been the location of several scenes in the film. A street leading out of the school was named Kevin Smith Way.

== Administration ==
The school's principal is Matthew Browne. His core administration team includes two assistant principals and the athletic director.

== Notable alumni ==
- Willie Lee "Flipper" Anderson Jr. (born 1965, class of 1983), former professional wide receiver who set the NFL record of most receiving yards in a game, with 336 yards
- John J. Burzichelli (born 1954, class of 1972), politician, mayor of Paulsboro and member of the New Jersey General Assembly
- Russell Carter (born 1985, class of 2003), a First Team All-Big East basketball player at Notre Dame in 2006–2007
- Julién Davenport (born 1995), former NFL offensive tackle who played for the Miami Dolphins
- Joseph H. Enos (1910–1973, class of 1928), politician who represented the 3rd legislative district in the New Jersey General Assembly from 1968 to 1971
- Gerald Hodges (born 1991, class of 2009), former NFL linebacker
- Isaac Redman (born 1984, class of 2003), running back who played in the NFL for the Pittsburgh Steelers
- Kevin Ross (born 1962, class of 1980), former NFL defensive back who played for the Kansas City Chiefs for eleven seasons
- Larry Sharpe (born 1951), retired professional wrestler, manager and trainer
- Alex Silvestro (born 1988, class of 2007), defensive end who played in the NFL for the New England Patriots and Baltimore Ravens
- Edwin H. Simmons (born 1921, class of 1938), highly decorated United States Marine Corps officer
- Bhayshul Tuten (born 2002, class of 2021), American football running back for the Jacksonville Jaguars
- Chazz Witherspoon (born 1981, class of 1999), professional boxer
