= Woodbury Public Schools =

School district in Gloucester County, New Jersey, US

Address
- 25 North Broad Street Woodbury, Gloucester County, New Jersey, 08096; United States
- Coordinates: 39.83861°N 75.153028°W

District information
- Grades: Pre-K to 12
- Superintendent: Andrew Bell
- Business administrator: Nancy McCabe
- Schools: 4

Students and staff
- Enrollment: 1,707 (as of 2022–23)
- Faculty: 140.5 FTEs
- Student–teacher ratio: 12.2:1

Other information
- District Factor Group: B
- Website: www.woodburysch.com
Ind.	Per pupil	District spending	Rank (*)	K-12 average	%± vs. average
1A	Total Spending	$19,438	33	$18,891	2.9%
1	Budgetary Cost	14,366	30	14,783	−2.8%
2	Classroom Instruction	8,530	29	8,763	−2.7%
6	Support Services	2,437	36	2,392	1.9%
8	Administrative Cost	1,532	16	1,485	3.2%
10	Operations & Maintenance	1,399	11	1,783	−21.5%
13	Extracurricular Activities	429	23	268	60.1%
16	Median Teacher Salary	62,773	30	64,043
Data from NJDoE 2014 Taxpayers' Guide to Education Spending. *Of K-12 districts with up to 1,800 students. Lowest spending=1; Highest=49

The Woodbury Public Schools (WPS) is a comprehensive community public school district that serves students in pre-kindergarten through twelfth grade from Woodbury, in Gloucester County, in the U.S. state of New Jersey.

As of the 2022–23 school year, the district, comprised of four schools, had an enrollment of 1,707 students and 140.5 classroom teachers (on an FTE basis), for a student–teacher ratio of 12.2:1.

The district is classified by the New Jersey Department of Education as being in District Factor Group "B", the second-lowest of eight groupings. District Factor Groups organize districts statewide to allow comparison by common socioeconomic characteristics of the local districts. From lowest socioeconomic status to highest, the categories are A, B, CD, DE, FG, GH, I and J.

== Awards and recognition ==
Woodbury Public Schools logo

- Evergreen Avenue Elementary School was recognized by Governor Jim McGreevey in 2003 as one of 25 schools selected statewide for the First Annual Governor's School of Excellence award.
- Evergreen Avenue Elementary School was recognized in the 2001–02 school year as a Star School, by the New Jersey Department of Education, the highest state honor a New Jersey school can receive.
- In 1998–99, the Woodbury Public Schools was recognized with the Best Practices Award by the New Jersey Department of Education for its Hollywood Kids Special Education program for students in Pre-K through 5th grade.
- Woodbury Junior-Senior High School was recognized as a NASA Explorer School in 2004, one of only 50 selected in the nation to work exclusively with NASA on improving technology and science education in the school.
- The Woodbury High School received the Gaston Caperton College Board Award, celebrating the "extraordinary commitment of educators and communities to their students' futures." This award is given to three schools in the nation on an annual basis.
- The Woodbury Junior-Senior High School is an AVID National Demonstration school, one of approximately 125 schools out of over 4,000 AVID schools nationally.

== Schools ==
Schools in the district (with 2022–23 enrollment data from the National Center for Education Statistics) are:

Elementary schools

- Evergreen Avenue Elementary School with 323 students in grades PreK-5
  - Jason Vivadelli, principal
- Walnut Street Elementary School with 129 students in grades PreK-5
  - Jeffrey W. Adams, principal
- West End Memorial Elementary School with 394 students in grades K-5
  - Joseph DeLecce, principal

Middle / high school

- Woodbury Junior-Senior High School with 829 students in grades 6-12
  - Dwayne Dobbins and Mylisa Himmons, co-principals

== Administration ==
Core members of the district's administration are:

- Andrew T. Bell Sr., superintendent
- Nancy L. McCabe, business administrator and board secretary

== Board of education ==
The district's board of education, comprised of nine members, sets policy and oversees the fiscal and educational operation of the district through its administration. As a Type II school district, the board's trustees are elected directly by voters to serve three-year terms of office on a staggered basis, with three seats up for election each year held (since 2012) as part of the November general election. The board appoints a superintendent to oversee the district's day-to-day operations and a business administrator to supervise the business functions of the district.
