= Woodbury, New Jersey =

City in Gloucester County, New Jersey, US

- City
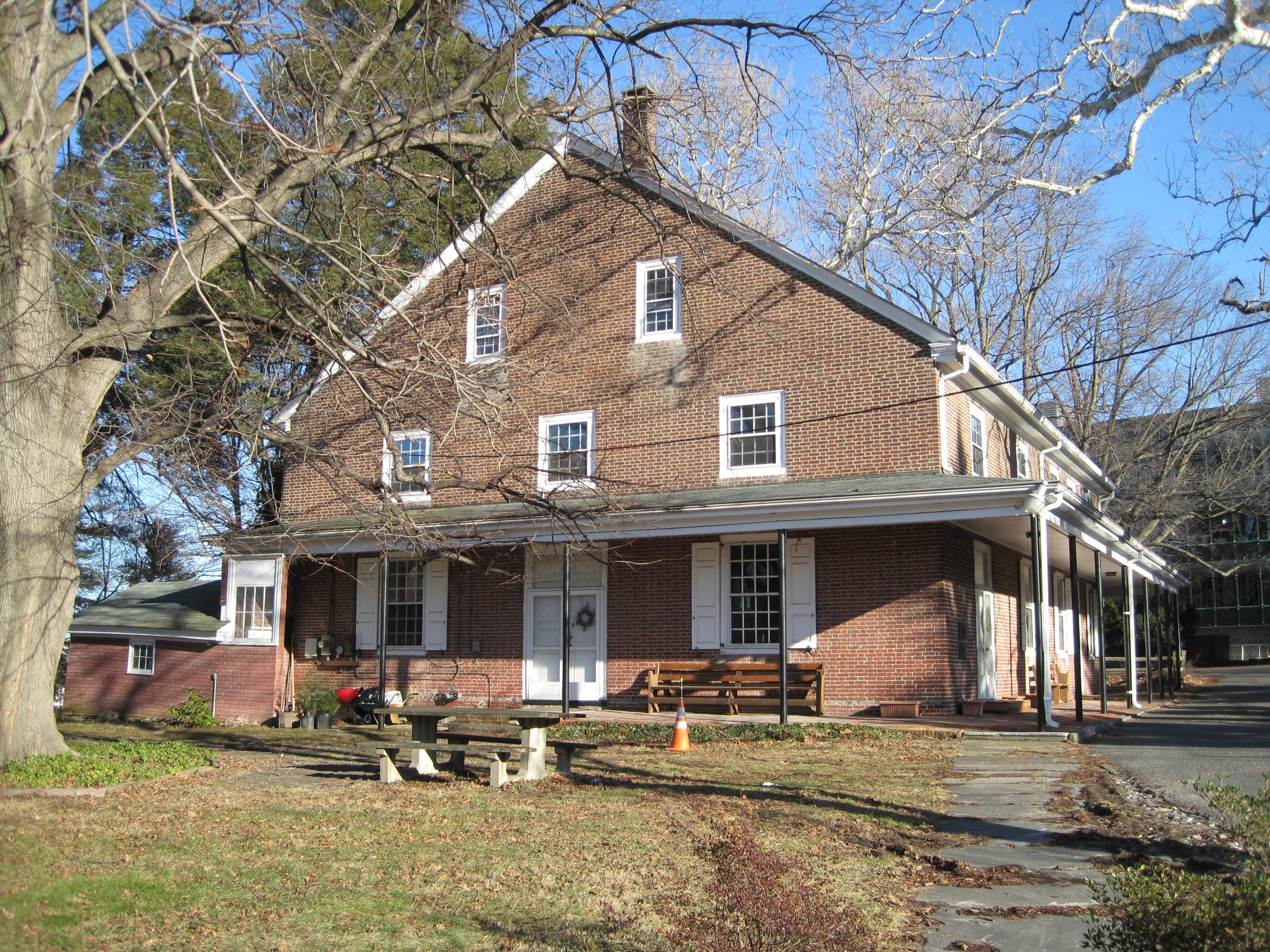
- Woodbury Friends' Meetinghouse, January 2010

- logo
- Motto: "The city you can grow with!"
- Map of Woodbury highlighted within Gloucester County Inset: Location of Gloucester County in New Jersey.

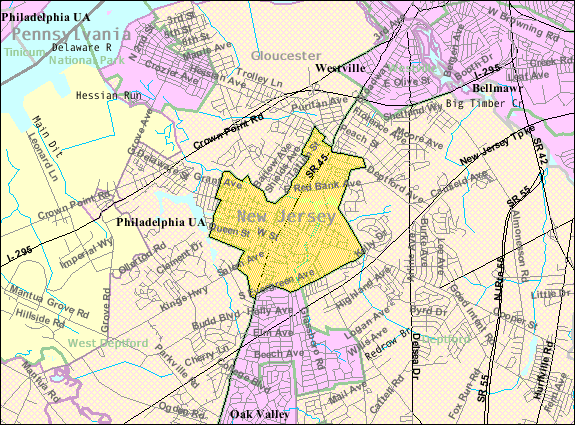
- Census Bureau map of Woodbury, New Jersey Interactive map of Woodbury, New Jersey

- Location in Gloucester County Location in New Jersey Location in the United States
- Coordinates: 39.837906°N 75.15153°W
- Country: United States
- State: New Jersey
- County: Gloucester
- Founded: 1683
- Incorporated: March 27, 1854

Government
  - Type: City
  - Body: City Council
  - Mayor: Kyle Miller (D, term ends December 31, 2028)
  - Administrator: John Leech
  - Municipal clerk: Cassidy L. Swanson

Area
  - Total: 2.10 sq mi (5.45 km^{2})
  - Land: 2.02 sq mi (5.23 km^{2})
  - Water: 0.085 sq mi (0.22 km^{2}) 3.95%
  - Rank: 402nd of 565 in state 18th of 24 in county
- Elevation: 52 ft (16 m)

Population (2020)
  - Total: 9,963
  - Estimate (2023): 10,063
  - Rank: 247th of 565 in state 11th of 24 in county
  - Density: 4,932.2/sq mi (1,904.3/km^{2})
  - Rank: 114th of 565 in state 1st of 24 in county
- Time zone: UTC−05:00 (Eastern (EST))
  - Summer (DST): UTC−04:00 (Eastern (EDT))
- ZIP Codes: 08096–08097
- Area code: 856
- FIPS code: 3401582120
- GNIS feature ID: 0885447
- Website: woodbury.nj.us

Woodbury is a city in and the county seat of Gloucester County in the U.S. state of New Jersey. The city, along with the rest of Gloucester County, is part of South Jersey and of the Philadelphia metropolitan area. As of the 2020 United States census, the city's population was 9,963, a decrease of 211 (−2.1%) from the 2010 census count of 10,174, which in turn reflected a decline of 133 (−1.3%) from the 10,307 in the 2000 census.

Woodbury was originally formed as a borough on March 27, 1854, within Deptford Township based on the results of a March 22, 1854, referendum. On January 2, 1871, Woodbury was reincorporated as a city based on the results of a referendum held that day.

Inspira Health Network is based in Woodbury. The now-defunct Woodbury Country Club operated in Woodbury from 1897 to 2010, closing due to declining membership and mounting debt that led to its 2013 bankruptcy filing.

The city had the 14th-highest property tax rate in New Jersey with an equalized rate of 4.582% as of 2020 compared to 3.212% in the county as a whole and a statewide average of 2.279%.

== History ==
As recounted by historian William McMahon, the Native Americans called the place where the city of Woodbury is now located "Piscozackasing", or "place of the black burrs".

Woodbury was founded in 1683 by Henry Wood, a Quaker from North West England who left Great Britain due to religious persecution. Wood was incarcerated in Lancaster for practicing as a Quaker and left his home in Tottington near Bury, Lancashire in a boat to set up a community in the new world where he and his family could practice his religion freely. His surname and hometown inspired naming the city that he founded Woodbury.

In 2000, Bury, England, and Woodbury were twinned as part of millennium celebrations in both countries. The twinning ceremony was the culmination of a week where more than 300 school children and college students, local dignitaries, and local residents from Bury took part in sporting and cultural events held in and around Woodbury. During the week, there was a symbolic meeting and reconciliation of the Vicar of Henry Wood's former church in Tottington and the Quaker meeting house in Woodbury and an ecumenical service attended by many of the residents and visitors.

=== Paleontological discovery ===
In 1787, a fossil bone recovered in Woodbury from local Cretaceous strata was discussed by the American Philosophical Society in Philadelphia. The remains were only retrospectively identified as dinosaurian, as dinosaurs would not be scientifically recognized as a distinct group of reptiles until August 1841.

=== Recycling ===
Woodbury was the first city in the United States to mandate recycling. This effort was led by then-councilman and later mayor Donald P. Sanderson in the 1970s, and an ordinance was finally passed in December 1980. The idea of towing a recycling trailer behind a trash collection vehicle to enable the collection of trash and recyclable material at the same time emerged. Sanderson was asked to speak in municipalities throughout the country and other towns and cities soon followed suit.

=== Historic district ===
There are numerous contributing properties to the Broad Street Historic District encompassing Broad Street (located between Woodbury Creek and Courtland Street) Highland Mills, and Delaware Street (located between Broad and Wood streets) including the Gloucester County Courthouse, which was placed on the New Jersey Register of Historic Places (#1429) in 1988.

== Geography ==
According to the U.S. Census Bureau, the city had a total area of 2.10 square miles (5.45 km^{2}), including 2.02 square miles (5.23 km^{2}) of land and 0.08 square miles (0.22 km^{2}) of water (3.95%).

The city borders Deptford Township, West Deptford Township, and Woodbury Heights.

=== Climate ===
Woodbury has a humid subtropical climate (Köppen climate classification Cfa) typical of southern New Jersey with warm summers and cold winters.

Climate data for Woodbury
Month	Jan	Feb	Mar	Apr	May	Jun	Jul	Aug	Sep	Oct	Nov	Dec	Year
Mean daily maximum °F (°C)	41 (5)	45 (7)	54 (12)	65 (18)	74 (23)	82 (28)	87 (31)	85 (29)	78 (26)	67 (19)	57 (14)	46 (8)	65 (18)
Mean daily minimum °F (°C)	24 (−4)	26 (−3)	33 (1)	42 (6)	52 (11)	61 (16)	67 (19)	65 (18)	58 (14)	46 (8)	38 (3)	29 (−2)	45 (7)
Average precipitation inches (mm)	3.71 (94)	2.76 (70)	4.08 (104)	3.95 (100)	4.38 (111)	3.81 (97)	4.52 (115)	4.37 (111)	4.11 (104)	3.26 (83)	3.51 (89)	3.49 (89)	45.95 (1,167)

== Demographics ==
Historical population
Census	Pop.	Note	%±
1860	1,534		—
1870	1,965		28.1%
1880	2,298		16.9%
1890	3,911		70.2%
1900	4,087		4.5%
1910	4,642		13.6%
1920	5,801		25.0%
1930	8,172		40.9%
1940	8,306		1.6%
1950	10,931		31.6%
1960	12,453		13.9%
1970	12,408		−0.4%
1980	10,353		−16.6%
1990	10,904		5.3%
2000	10,307		−5.5%
2010	10,174		−1.3%
2020	9,963		−2.1%
2023 (est.)	10,063		1.0%
Population sources: 1870–2000 1860–1920; 1860–1870 1870 1880–1890; 1890–1910 1910–1930; 1940–2000 2000; 2010 2020

=== 2020 census ===
As of the 2020 census, Woodbury had a population of 9,963. The median age was 38.4 years. 23.4% of residents were under the age of 18 and 17.0% of residents were 65 years of age or older. For every 100 females there were 88.6 males, and for every 100 females age 18 and over there were 84.0 males age 18 and over.

100.0% of residents lived in urban areas, while 0.0% lived in rural areas.

There were 4,068 households in Woodbury, of which 29.4% had children under the age of 18 living in them. Of all households, 34.8% were married-couple households, 19.4% were households with a male householder and no spouse or partner present, and 37.7% were households with a female householder and no spouse or partner present. About 34.2% of all households were made up of individuals and 16.5% had someone living alone who was 65 years of age or older.

There were 4,532 housing units, of which 10.2% were vacant. The homeowner vacancy rate was 3.1% and the rental vacancy rate was 10.4%.

Racial composition as of the 2020 census
Race	Number	Percent
White	5,446	54.7%
Black or African American	2,562	25.7%
American Indian and Alaska Native	50	0.5%
Asian	164	1.6%
Native Hawaiian and Other Pacific Islander	8	0.1%
Some other race	799	8.0%
Two or more races	934	9.4%
Hispanic or Latino (of any race)	1,578	15.8%

=== 2010 census ===
The 2010 United States census counted 10,174 people, 4,088 households, and 2,420 families in the city. The population density was 5,064.0 inhabitants per square mile (1,955.2/km^{2}). There were 4,456 housing units at an average density of 2,217.9 per square mile (856.3/km^{2}). The racial makeup was 66.01% (6,716) White, 24.91% (2,534) Black or African American, 0.23% (23) Native American, 1.28% (130) Asian, 0.28% (28) Pacific Islander, 3.19% (325) from other races, and 4.11% (418) from two or more races. Hispanic or Latino of any race were 10.66% (1,085) of the population.

Of the 4,088 households, 27.9% had children under the age of 18; 36.6% were married couples living together; 17.4% had a female householder with no husband present and 40.8% were non-families. Of all households, 35.3% were made up of individuals and 16.0% had someone living alone who was 65 years of age or older. The average household size was 2.38 and the average family size was 3.10.

23.5% of the population were under the age of 18, 8.7% from 18 to 24, 28.0% from 25 to 44, 25.9% from 45 to 64, and 14.0% who were 65 years of age or older. The median age was 37.0 years. For every 100 females, the population had 93.1 males. For every 100 females ages 18 and older there were 90.3 males.

The Census Bureau's 2006–2010 American Community Survey showed that (in 2010 inflation-adjusted dollars) median household income was $58,629 (with a margin of error of +/− $4,598) and the median family income was $74,276 (+/− $7,880). Males had a median income of $57,019 (+/− $3,425) versus $37,363 (+/− $6,910) for females. The per capita income for the borough was $28,845 (+/− $2,571). About 7.8% of families and 11.4% of the population were below the poverty line, including 15.7% of those under age 18 and 15.0% of those age 65 or over.

=== 2000 census ===
As of the 2000 United States census, there were 10,307 people, 4,051 households, and 2,588 families residing in the city. The population density was 4,961.4 inhabitants per square mile (1,915.6/km^{2}). There were 4,310 housing units at an average density of 2,074.7 per square mile (801.0/km^{2}). The racial makeup of the city was 72.45% White, 22.83% African American, 0.22% Native American, 0.99% Asian, 0.14% Pacific Islander, 1.28% from other races, and 2.10% from two or more races. Hispanic or Latino of any race were 3.94% of the population.

There were 4,051 households, out of which 32.3% had children under the age of 18 living with them, 41.4% were married couples living together, 18.5% had a female householder with no husband present, and 36.1% were non-families. 31.7% of all households were made up of individuals, and 15.4% had someone living alone who was 65 years of age or older. The average household size was 2.43 and the average family size was 3.08.

In the city, the population was spread out, with 24.8% under the age of 18, 8.5% from 18 to 24, 29.8% from 25 to 44, 20.4% from 45 to 64, and 16.5% who were 65 years of age or older. The median age was 37 years. For every 100 females, there were 87.7 males. For every 100 females age 18 and over, there were 82.7 males.

The median income for a household in the city was $41,827 per annum and the median income for a family was $53,630. Males had a median income of $40,429 versus $30,570 for females. The per capita income for the city was $21,592. About 11.2% of families and 13.5% of the population were below the poverty line, including 17.7% of those under age 18 and 15.4% of those age 65 or over.

== Government ==
=== Local government ===
Woodbury is governed under the City form of New Jersey municipal government, which is used in 15 municipalities (of the 564) statewide. The governing body is comprised of the mayor and the city council. A mayor is elected at-large directly by the voters for a two-year term of office. The city council has nine members, three from each of three wards, elected to serve three-year terms on a staggered basis, with one seat from each ward coming up for election each year as part of the November general election in a three-year cycle.

As of 2025, the mayor of Woodbury is Democrat Kyle Miller, whose term ends December 31, 2026. Members of the Woodbury City Council are Council President William H. Fleming Jr. (D, 2027; Ward 2), Sam Ferraino (D, 2026; Ward 3), Danielle Carter (D, 2025; Ward 1), Norlyn Garlic (D, 2025; Ward 2), Frances Harwell (D, 2026; Ward 2), Robert Johnson (D, 2025; Ward 3 - elected to serve an unexpired term), Ryan Lange (D, 2027; Ward 3), Reed Merinuk (D, 2022; Ward 3), Donna Miller (D, 2026; Ward 1) and Jo Miller (D, 2027; Ward 1).

In April 2017, the city council selected Karlene O'Connor from a list of three candidates nominated by the Democratic municipal committee to fill the Second Ward seat expiring in December 2019 that had been held by David Trovato until he resigned from office earlier in the month.

At the January 2017 reorganization meeting, the city council chose Kenneth McIlvaine from three candidates nominated by the Democratic municipal committee to fill the Third Ward seat expiring in December 2017 that was vacated by Jessica Floyd when she took office as mayor.

The Democratic sweep in November 2012 of the three council seats and mayor gave the party a 6–3 majority on the 2013 council.

=== Federal, state and county representation ===
Woodbury is located in the 1st Congressional District and is part of New Jersey's 5th state legislative district.

For the 119th United States Congress, New Jersey's 1st congressional district is represented by Donald Norcross (D, Camden). New Jersey is represented in the United States Senate by Democrats Cory Booker (Newark, term ends 2027) and Andy Kim (Moorestown, term ends 2031).

For the 2026–2027 session, the 5th legislative district of the New Jersey Legislature is represented in the State Senate by Nilsa Cruz-Perez (D, Barrington) and in the General Assembly by Bill Moen (D, Camden) and William Spearman (D, Camden).

Gloucester County is governed by a board of county commissioners, whose seven members are elected at-large to three-year terms of office on a staggered basis in partisan elections, with either two or three seats coming up for election each year. At a reorganization meeting held each January, the Board selects a Director and a Deputy Director from among its members. As of 2025, Gloucester County's Commissioners are:

Director Frank J. DiMarco (D, Deptford Township, 2025), Matt Weng (D, Pitman, 2026), Joann Gattinelli (D, Washington Township, 2026), Nicholas DeSilvio (R, Franklin Township, 2027), Denice DiCarlo (D, West Deptford Township, 2025) Deputy Director Jim Jefferson (D, Woodbury, 2026) and Christopher Konawel Jr. (R, Glassboro, 2027).

Gloucester County's constitutional officers are: Clerk James N. Hogan (D, Franklin Township; 2027), Sheriff Carmel Morina (D, Greenwich Township; 2027) and Surrogate Giuseppe "Joe" Chila (D, Woolwich Township; 2028).

=== Politics ===
United States presidential election results for Woodbury 2024 2020 2016 2012 2008 2004
Year	Republican		Democratic		Third party(ies)	
Year	No.	%	No.	%	No.	%
2024	1,411	31.65%	2,965	66.51%	82	1.84%
2020	1,502	30.97%	3,264	67.30%	84	1.73%
2016	1,358	31.86%	2,712	63.62%	193	4.53%
2012	1,356	30.87%	2,972	67.65%	65	1.48%
2008	1,487	31.23%	3,216	67.55%	58	1.22%
2004	1,742	38.54%	2,735	60.51%	43	0.95%

As of March 2011, there were a total of 6,368 registered voters in Woodbury, of which 2,255 (35.4%) were registered as Democrats, 1,162 (18.2%) were registered as Republicans and 2,948 (46.3%) were registered as Unaffiliated. There were 3 voters registered as Libertarians or Greens.

Gubernatorial election results for Woodbury
Year	Republican		Democratic		Third party(ies)	
Year	No.	%	No.	%	No.	%
2025	1,026	29.47%	2,408	69.18%	47	1.35%
2021	972	37.63%	1,575	60.98%	36	1.39%
2017	809	33.24%	1,553	63.80%	72	2.96%
2013	1,499	58.62%	1,007	39.38%	51	1.99%
2009	995	37.17%	1,416	52.90%	266	9.94%
2005	1,086	41.29%	1,423	54.11%	121	4.60%

In the 2012 presidential election, Democrat Barack Obama received 67.7% of the vote (2,972 cast), ahead of Republican Mitt Romney with 30.9% (1,356 votes), and other candidates with 1.5% (65 votes), among the 4,430 ballots cast by the city's 6,623 registered voters (37 ballots were spoiled), for a turnout of 66.9%. In the 2008 presidential election, Democrat Barack Obama received 66.9% of the vote (3,216 cast), ahead of Republican John McCain with 30.9% (1,487 votes) and other candidates with 1.2% (58 votes), among the 4,806 ballots cast by the city's 6,829 registered voters, for a turnout of 70.4%. In the 2004 presidential election, Democrat John Kerry received 60.1% of the vote (2,735 ballots cast), outpolling Republican George W. Bush with 38.3% (1,742 votes) and other candidates with 0.7% (43 votes), among the 4,547 ballots cast by the city's 6,521 registered voters, for a turnout percentage of 69.7.

In the 2013 gubernatorial election, Republican Chris Christie received 58.6% of the vote (1,499 cast), ahead of Democrat Barbara Buono with 39.4% (1,007 votes), and other candidates with 2.0% (51 votes), among the 2,608 ballots cast by the city's 6,370 registered voters (51 ballots were spoiled), for a turnout of 40.9%. In the 2009 gubernatorial election, Democrat Jon Corzine received 51.8% of the vote (1,416 ballots cast), ahead of Republican Chris Christie with 36.4% (995 votes), Independent Chris Daggett with 8.5% (232 votes) and other candidates with 1.2% (34 votes), among the 2,732 ballots cast by the city's 6,649 registered voters, yielding a 41.1% turnout.

United States Senate election results for Woodbury1
Year	Republican		Democratic		Third party(ies)	
Year	No.	%	No.	%	No.	%
2024	1,347	31.10%	2,897	66.89%	87	2.01%
2018	1,205	35.49%	2,001	58.94%	189	5.57%
2012	1,258	29.71%	2,879	68.00%	97	2.29%
2006	1,205	41.58%	1,617	55.80%	76	2.62%

United States Senate election results for Woodbury2
Year	Republican		Democratic		Third party(ies)	
Year	No.	%	No.	%	No.	%
2020	1,468	30.72%	3,189	66.74%	121	2.53%
2014	897	35.55%	1,577	62.50%	49	1.94%
2013	538	36.75%	907	61.95%	19	1.30%
2008	1,472	32.98%	2,876	64.44%	115	2.58%

== Education ==
Woodbury Public Schools serve students in pre-kindergarten through twelfth grade. As of the 2022–23 school year, the district, comprised of four schools, had an enrollment of 1,707 students and 140.5 classroom teachers (on an FTE basis), for a student–teacher ratio of 12.2:1. Schools in the district (with 2022–23 enrollment data from the National Center for Education Statistics) are Evergreen Avenue Elementary School with 323 students in grades PreK-5, Walnut Street Elementary School with 129 students in grades PreK-5, West End Memorial Elementary School with 394 students in grades K-5 and Woodbury Junior-Senior High School with 829 students in grades 6-12.

Students from across Gloucester County are eligible to apply to attend Gloucester County Institute of Technology, a four-year high school in Deptford Township that provides technical and vocational education. As a public school, students do not pay tuition to attend the school.

Holy Angels Catholic School is a Catholic school serving students in PreK–8, operated by the Roman Catholic Diocese of Camden and located in the building built originally as St. Patrick's School in 1944. It was established in 2017 by the Bishop of Camden as the successor to Holy Trinity Regional School, which was created as part of the 2007 merger of the parish catholic schools of St. Patrick's, St. Matthew's of National Park and Most Holy Redeemer of Westville Grove.

== Transportation ==
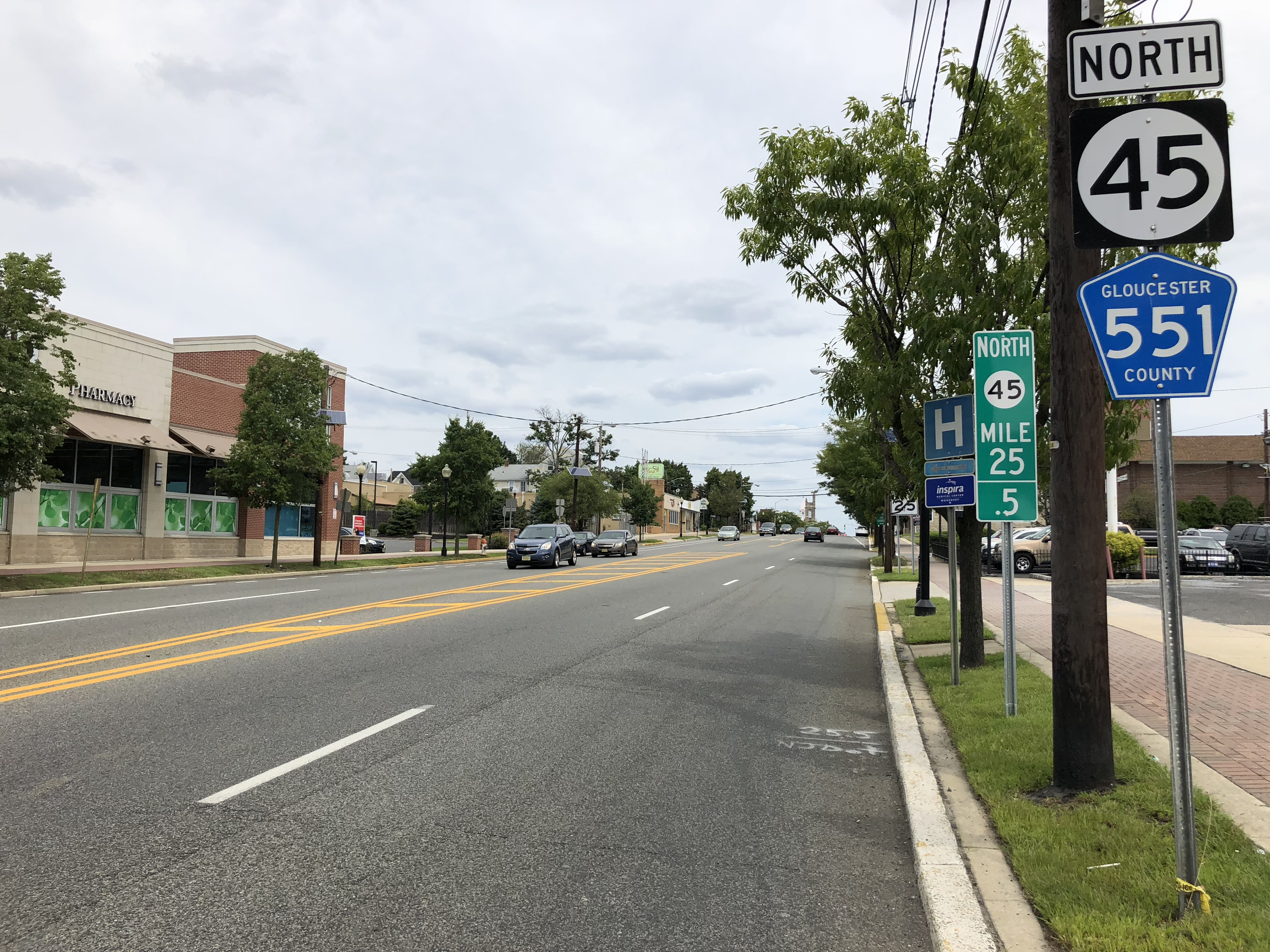
Route 45 and County Route 551 in Woodbury

=== Roads and highways ===
As of May 2010, the city had a total of 36.26 mi (58.35 km) of roadways, of which 29.15 mi (46.91 km) were maintained by the municipality, 5.04 mi (8.11 km) by Gloucester County and 2.07 mi (3.33 km) by the New Jersey Department of Transportation.

Several roadways pass through the city. Route 45, also known as Mantua Avenue and Broad Street at various points, enters the city at its southernmost point from West Deptford Township and proceeds for 1.8 mi (2.9 km) before heading along the Deptford Township/West Deptford Township border at the north end of the city. County Route 551 (Salem Avenue) enters from West Deptford Township in the southwest and proceeds for 0.5 mi (0.80 km) before beginning a concurrency with Route 45.

=== Public transportation ===
NJ Transit bus service between the city and Philadelphia is available on the 401 (from Salem), 402 (from Pennsville Township), 410 (from Bridgeton), and 412 (from Sewell) routes, and local service is offered on the 455 (Cherry Hill to Paulsboro) and 463 (between Woodbury and the Avandale Park/Ride in Winslow Township) routes.

Beginning in the 1860s and ending in 1971, passenger train service was provided by the Camden and Woodbury Railroad, West Jersey Railroad, West Jersey & Seashore Railroad, and the Pennsylvania-Reading Seashore Lines. Woodbury station was built in 1883 and renovated in 2000.

Two stops, at Red Bank Avenue and Woodbury station, on the proposed Glassboro–Camden Line, an 18 mi (28.97 km) diesel multiple unit (DMU) light rail system, are planned. Originally projected for completion in 2019, the line has since been delayed until at least 2025.

== Notable people ==
People who were born in, residents of, or otherwise closely associated with Woodbury include:

- Clifford Addams (1876–1942), painter and etcher
- Ken Albers (1924–2007), singer with the Four Freshmen
- Don Amendolia (born 1944), actor
- Anthony Averett (born 1994), professional football player, Las Vegas Raiders
- John Boyd Avis (1875–1944), U.S. federal judge
- Eli Ayers (1778–1822), physician who was the first colonial agent of the American Colonization Society in what would later become Liberia
- George Benjamin Jr. (1919–1944), U.S. Army soldier and a posthumous recipient of the U.S. military's highest decoration, the Medal of Honor, for his actions during the Philippines campaign of World War II
- J. S. G. Boggs (1955–2017), artist best known for his hand-drawn depictions of banknotes
- Carroll William "Boardwalk" Brown (1889–1977), a Major League Baseball pitcher for the Philadelphia Athletics
- Roscoe Lee Browne (1922–2007), character actor and athlete
- Dave Budd (born 1938), former NBA player for the New York Knicks who was one of the three centers for the Knicks assigned to guard Wilt Chamberlain in the game in which he scored 100 points
- King Kong Bundy (1957–2019), WWE wrestler
- Dave Calloway (born 1968), former head coach of the Monmouth Hawks men's basketball team
- Kyle Cassidy (born 1966), professional photographer
- Joe Colone (1926–2009), professional basketball player who played in the NBA for the New York Knicks
- John Cooper (1729–1785), member of the Provincial Congress of New Jersey in 1775 and 1776 who served on the committee that drafted New Jersey's first constitution
- Mike Cox (born 1985), former professional football player, Atlanta Falcons and Kansas City Chiefs
- Daniel Dalton (born 1949), politician who served as New Jersey Senate Majority Leader and as Secretary of State of New Jersey
- Franklin Davenport (1755–1832), Benjamin Franklin's nephew and a Federalist Party U.S. Senator
- Donald J. Farish (1942–2018), college administrator who served as president of Rowan University
- Joe Fields (born 1953), former professional football player who played in the NFL for the New York Giants and New York Jets
- Oscar Fraley (1914–1994), co-author, with Eliot Ness, of The Untouchables which sold 1.5 million copies
- Samuel Gibbs French (1818–1910), Confederate Major General whose summer home in Woodbury was stormed after residents found out about his service for the South
- Craig Goess (born 1981), former NASCAR and ARCA Menards Series race car driver
- George Gill Green (1842–1925), patent medicine entrepreneur and American Civil War colonel
- Michael Guest (born 1970), U.S. representative for Mississippi
- Grace Helbig (born 1985), comedian, actress, author and creator who has hosted the web series It's Grace
- Robert C. Hendrickson (1898–1964), United States Senator from New Jersey
- Donald F. Holmes (1910–1980), inventor
- Nelson Jones (born 1964), professional football player for the San Diego Chargers
- John Joseph Kitchen (1911–1973), U.S. federal judge
- George Knapp (born 1952), investigative journalist
- Tom Kovach (born 1969), attorney and former politician who served in the Delaware House of Representatives
- George F. Kugler Jr. (1925–2004), lawyer who served as New Jersey Attorney General
- David Laganella (born 1974), composer
- Jonathan V. Last (born 1974), The Weekly Standard columnist
- James Lawrence (1781–1813), who coined the phrase "Don't give up the ship" during the War of 1812
- Mike McBath (born 1946), former defensive end for the Buffalo Bills and part-owner of the Orlando Predators
- Bryant McKinnie (born 1979), former professional football player for the Baltimore Ravens
- Dan Meyer (born 1981), former professional baseball player who played for the Atlanta Braves, Florida Marlins, and Oakland Athletics
- Dave Miller (born 1966), former bullpen coach for the Cleveland Indians of Major League Baseball
- Tyler Miller (born 1993), soccer player
- J. Hampton Moore (1864–1950), Congressman who served as Mayor of Philadelphia (1920–1924; 1932–1936)
- Tim O'Shea (born 1962), men's basketball head coach of the Bryant Bulldogs
- Paul Owens (1924–2003), manager of the 1983 National League pennant-winning Philadelphia Phillies
- Francis F. Patterson Jr. (1867–1935), represented New Jersey's 1st congressional district in the United States House of Representatives from 1920 to 1927
- Jack Pierce (born 1962), Olympic bronze medalist in the 100-meter high hurdles at the 1992 Olympic Games
- Chris Pressley (born 1986), former fullback who played for the Cincinnati Bengals
- John Chandler Rafferty (1816–1880), politician
- Dorcas Reilly (1926–2018), chef, homemaker and inventor, best known for popularizing the green bean casserole
- Ronny J (born 1992), record producer, rapper, and singer
- H. Browning Ross (1924–1998), Olympian in long-distance running (1948) and gold medal winner in the 1,500-meter at the 1951 Pan American Games
- Patti Smith (born 1946), singer-songwriter
- Heather Spytek (born 1977), June 2001 Playboy Magazine Playmate of the Month
- H. Donald Stewart (born 1939), politician who served in the New Jersey General Assembly from 1972 to 1982
- Dennis Joseph Sullivan (born 1945), Roman Catholic Diocese of Camden bishop
- Al Szolack (born 1950), former member of the Washington Generals traveling basketball team
- D. K. Ulrich (born 1944), former NASCAR driver and owner
- David Ogden Watkins (1862–1938), acting governor of New Jersey who was mayor of Woodbury from 1886 to 1890
- Ann Cooper Whitall (1716–1797), a Quaker woman known for her actions at the Battle of Red Bank
- John M. Whitall (1800–1877), sea captain, businessman, and philanthropist
- John L. White (1930–2001), politician who served in both the New Jersey General Assembly and the New Jersey Senate
- Raymond Zane (1939–2024), politician who served in the New Jersey Senate, where he represented the 3rd Legislative District
