= Haddonfield Memorial High School =

High school in Camden County, New Jersey, US

Location
- 401 Kings Highway East; Haddonfield, Camden County, New Jersey 08033; United States; 39.901079°N 75.02637°W

Information
- Type: Public high school
- Established: 1927
- NCES School ID: 340639001554
- Principal: Tammy McHale
- Faculty: 81.2 FTEs
- Enrollment: 827 (as of 2024–25)
- Student to teacher ratio: 10.2:1
- Colors: Black; Dark Red
- Athletics conference: Colonial Conference (general); West Jersey Football League (football)
- Team name: Bulldawgs
- Rival: West Deptford High School
- Yearbook: The Shield
- Website: high.haddonfieldschools.org

Haddonfield Memorial High School is a four-year comprehensive community public high school that serves students in ninth through twelfth grade from Haddonfield, in Camden County, in the U.S. state of New Jersey, operating as the lone secondary school of the Haddonfield Public Schools.

As of the 2024–25 school year, the school had an enrollment of 827 students and 81.2 classroom teachers (on an FTE basis), for a student–teacher ratio of 10.2:1. There were 17 students (2.1% of enrollment) eligible for free lunch and 4 (0.5% of students) eligible for reduced-cost lunch.

== History ==
Completed at a cost of $500,000 (equivalent to $9.3 million in 2025), ceremonies were held in October 1927 to dedicate the building "to the memory of Haddonfield residents killed in the World War." Four residents died in the war.

In May 1954, with enrollment exceeding the school's target of 1,000, the Haddonfield district notified the Delaware Township School District (since renamed as the Cherry Hill Public Schools) that its students would no longer be taken after June 1956, having already told the Gloucester Township Public Schools a year earlier that its students would no longer be accepted after June 1955. While there were 420 Haddonfield students, there were a total of 760 students as part of sending/receiving relationships, including about 270 from Gloucester Township, 200 from Delaware Township (now Cherry Hill), 90 from Haddon Township, 90 from Voorhees Township, 75 from Evesham Township, 20 from Gibbsboro and smaller numbers from Lawnside and Woodlynne.

Students from Gibbsboro and Voorhees Township, New Jersey had attended the district's high school as part of sending agreements with the Gibbsboro School District and the Voorhees Township Public Schools until Eastern Regional High School opened in September 1965.

In 1992, Gwen Florio of the Philadelphia Inquirer described Haddonfield Memorial HS as "pretty, petite, and rich — the "trophy school" of South Jersey districts." In 1992 Merchantville School District considered severing its send-receive relationship with Pennsauken School District, in which Merchantville sent students to Pennsauken High School, so Merchantville could send them to Haddonfield Memorial High instead. John Ellis, the New Jersey State Commissioner of Education, blocked Merchantville leaving the partnership on the grounds that it would cause more white students to leave Pennsauken High.

== Awards, recognition and rankings ==
- During the 2004–05 school year, Haddonfield Memorial High School was awarded the Blue Ribbon School Award of Excellence by the United States Department of Education, the highest award an American school can receive.
- The school was the 6th-ranked public high school in New Jersey out of 305 schools statewide in New Jersey Monthly magazine's September 2018 cover story on the state's "Top Public High Schools", using a new ranking methodology. The school had been ranked 33rd in the state of 328 schools in 2012, after being ranked 11th in 2010 out of 322 schools listed. The magazine ranked the school 14th in 2008 out of 316 schools. The school was ranked 17th in the magazine's September 2006 issue, which included 316 schools across the state.
- Schooldigger.com ranked the school 23rd out of 381 public high schools statewide in its 2011 rankings (an increase of 13 positions from the 2010 ranking) which were based on the combined percentage of students classified as proficient or above proficient on the mathematics (95.7%) and language arts literacy (98.9%) components of the High School Proficiency Assessment (HSPA).
- In the 2011 "Ranking America's High Schools" issue by The Washington Post, the school was ranked 30th in New Jersey and 1,061st nationwide. In Newsweek's May 22, 2007, issue, ranking the country's top high schools, Haddonfield Memorial High School was listed in 910th place, the 26th-highest ranked school in New Jersey.
- The school was ranked 236th in the nation and 21st in New Jersey on the list of "America's Best High Schools 2012" prepared by The Daily Beast / Newsweek, with rankings based primarily on graduation rate, matriculation rate for college and number of Advanced Placement / International Baccalaureate courses taken per student, with lesser factors based on average scores on the SAT / ACT, average AP/IB scores and the number of AP/IB courses available to students.
- In its 2013 report on "America's Best High Schools", The Daily Beast ranked the school 186th in the nation among participating public high schools and 13th overall (seventh of non-magnet schools) in New Jersey.
- Haddonfield Memorial High School's 1989 Shield was selected as a Silver Crown Yearbook High School award winner in 1990 from the Columbia Scholastic Press Association.

== Athletics ==
The Haddonfield Memorial High School Bulldawgs compete as a member of the Colonial Conference, which is comprised of public high schools located in Camden and Gloucester counties, and operates under the supervision of the New Jersey State Interscholastic Athletic Association (NJSIAA). With 672 students in grades 10–12, the school was classified by the NJSIAA for the 2022–24 school years as Group II South for most athletic competition purposes. The football team competes in the Constitution Division of the 94-team West Jersey Football League superconference and was classified by the NJSIAA as Group II South for football for 2024–2026, which included schools with 514 to 685 students.

=== ShopRite Cup ===
The school was recognized as the Group II winner of the New Jersey State Interscholastic Athletic Association ShopRite Cup in 2005–06. The award recognized the school for achieving co-championship in girls soccer, 1st in boys soccer, a tie for 3rd in girls tennis, 1st in girls cross country, 3rd in boys cross country, a tie for 3rd in girls basketball, 1st in boys basketball, 2nd in girls swimming, 2nd in boys swimming, 3rd in girls indoor relay championships, 1st in boys golf, a tie for 3rd in boys tennis and 3rd in girls outdoor track.

The school repeated as the Group II winner of the ShopRite Cup in 2006–07, based on achieving 2nd place in girls soccer, 2nd in boys soccer, tied for 3rd in girls tennis, 1st in girls cross country, 1st in boys cross country, 2nd in field hockey, tied for 3rd in football, 1st in girls swimming, 2nd in boys swimming, 2nd in boys basketball, 2nd in girls indoor track and field relays, 3rd in girls indoor track and field, tied for 3rd in boys tennis and 1st in girls golf.

The school repeated as the Group II winner of the ShopRite Cup in 2007–08. The award recognized the school for achieving 1st place in girls' cross-country, 1st place in boys' cross-country, 1st place in girls' soccer, tied for 3rd in girls' tennis, 2nd girls swimming, 2nd in girls' winter track relays, 4th in boys' winter track relays, first in girls' winter track individuals, 3rd in boys winter track individuals, tied for 3rd in boys tennis, 2nd in girls golf, 2nd in girls spring track, 4th in boys spring track, plus 3 points for having no disqualifications for the winter season.

The school repeated as the Group II winner of the ShopRite Cup in 2008–09. The award recognized the school for achieving first in girls' cross-country, first in boys' cross-country, first in girls' tennis, tied for 3rd in field hockey, tied for 3rd in girls' soccer, tied for 3rd in football, first in girls' swimming, second in boys' swimming, second in girls' winter relays, second in boys winter track relays, second girls' winter track, second boys winter track, first in boys' golf, tied for 3rd in boys' tennis, first in boys' outdoor track, plus 9 points for having no disqualifications for the fall, winter, and spring seasons.

The school repeated as the Group II winner of the ShopRite Cup in 2009–10. The award recognized the school for achieving first-place finishes in boys cross-country, girls' tennis, girls' soccer, boys' swimming, boys' indoor relays, boys' indoor track and field and boys' outdoor track and field, second-place finishes in girls' cross-country, football, girls' swimming, boys' tennis and girls outdoor track and field, a tie for third in girls' basketball, a fourth place in girls' indoor track & field plus 9 points for having no disqualifications for the fall, winter, and spring seasons.

The school repeated as the Group II winner of the ShopRite Cup in 2010–11. The award recognized the school for achieving first-place finishes in girls' tennis, boys' cross-country, football, boys' indoor group track & field and boys outdoor track & field, second-place finishes in boys' indoor track & field relays and boys' golf, third place in outdoor track & field, field hockey (tie), boys' swimming (tie) and girls lacrosse (tie), a fourth place in girls' cross-country plus 9 points for having no disqualifications for the fall, winter, and spring seasons.

The school was the winner of the 2014–15 ShopRite Cup for Group II, finishing with 130 points, the most of any public high school.

For 2015–16, the school was again the Group II champion, behind first-place finishes in 1st in girls winter track relays and both boys and girls winter track, second-place finishes in 2nd in boys cross country, field hockey, boys winter track relays and both boys and girls swimming, third-place finishes in girls tennis, girls cross country, football and boys tennis, along with bonus points for having no disqualifications in the fall and winter seasons.

The school was the winner of the Group II winner of the Shop Rite Cup in 2016–17, 2017–18 and 2019–20.

=== Other accomplishments ===
The baseball team won the Group II state championship in 1971 (vs. runner-up East Paterson High School, which has since been renamed as Elmwood Park Memorial High School), 1972 (vs. Glen Rock High School), 1989 (vs. Wallington High School) and 1991 (vs. Butler High School). The 1971 team won the inaugural Group II state title with a 2–0 win in the championship game against East Paterson (since renamed as Elmwood Park). The 1972 team finished the season with a record of 22–3 after defeating Glen Rock by a score of 3–0 in the Group II championship game. In the 1989 playoff finals, the team beat Wallington by a score of 7–1 to win the Group I title and end the season at 17–5.

The boys' basketball team won the Group I state title in 1973 (vs. Orange High School) and 1989 (vs. Newark Tech High School), won the Group II state title in 2004 and 2005 (vs. Summit High School both years), 2006 (vs. Newark Central High School), 2018 (vs. Rumson-Fair Haven Regional High School) and 2019 (vs. West Side High School). In 2006, the team became the first from South Jersey to win three consecutive group titles (since Wildwood High School from 1940 to 1942) with an 82–57 win in the Group II championship game against Newark Central behind 21 points by Brian Zoubek. The team won the 2018 Group II title with a 43–39 win against Rumson-Fair Haven in the championship game played at RWJBarnabas Health Arena.

The field hockey team won the South Jersey Group II state sectional championship in 1975–1980, 2006, 2008, 2010 and 2011, and won the South Jersey Group I sectional title in 1985–1987, 1989–1991, 1997 and 1998; the team was Group II state champion in 1976 (defeating runner-up Pequannock Township High School), 1977 (vs. Montville Township High School) and 1978 (as co-champion with Butler High School), and won the Group I title in 1985 (vs. Chatham Borough High School), 1986 (vs. Chatham Township High School), 1987 (vs. Chatham Township), 1989 (co-champion with Belvidere High School) and 1991 (vs. Belvidere), 2016 (vs. Madison High School) and 2017 (vs. Madison). The program's nine state titles are tied for seventh-most in the state. The 1976 team defeated Pequannock in the championship game at Mercer County Park by a score of 2–0 to win the Group II state title and finish the season at 15–4–2. The 1977 team finished the season with a 15–1–3 record after winning the Group II title with a 1–0 victory against Montville in the tournament finals. A 1–1 tie in the 1978 playoff finals against Butler gave the team the Group II championship for the third year in a row, to finish the season at 17–0–4. The 1989 team finished the season with a 17–1–5 record after a scoreless tie with Belvidere after regulation and overtime in the Group I playoff finals.

The girls swim team won the Division B state championship in 1977, won the Public B title in 2002, 2003, 2007 and 2009, and won in Public C in 2019 through 2025 (with no championships in 2021, due to COVID); the program's 11 state titles are the fourth-most in the state. The girls swim team took the Public South B state sectional championship in 2003, topping Mainland Regional High School 87–83 in the tournament final. The 2007 team won the South – B state sectional championship with a 108–62 against Ocean Township High School. The team won six consecutive Division C state championships between 2019 and 2025, the longest streak of any school in the state.

The boys swimming team won the Public B title in 2000, 2001, 2004 and 2010, and won the Public C title in 2015. They have won 5 consecutive Public C championships between 2020 and 2025; the program's 10 state titles are the tenth-most in the state. The team won the 2007 South B state sectional championship with a 116–54 win against Shawnee High School. The swimming team won the Public B championships in 2010 with an 89–81 win against Mountain Lakes High School in the finals, having lost to Mountain Lakes in the championships in the four previous years. The team won their fifth consecutive Public C title in 2025.

The boys cross country team has been led by Coach Nick Baker since 1982, and through the 2022 season he has compiled a 365-16 record, including 241 victories in a row, the last loss being in 1997. They have won a New Jersey state record 40 South Jersey sectional championships, including the last 19 in a row, also through the 2022 season. The boys' team won the Group II state championship in 1978, 1980, 2000, 2002, 2006–2010, 2013, 2014, 2017–2019 and 2021-25 (no state championships were held in 2020), and won the Group I title in 1985, 1987, 1989 and 1990. The program's 23 state titles are tied for second among all schools in the state. The school's cross country team was ranked 4th in The Harrier's Nike / Foot Locker Super 25 National Rankings in 2001. In each of the three years from 2007 to 2009, Jonathan Vitez won the individual Group II cross-country running championship, making him the seventh runner in state history to earn three individual state titles.

The girls tennis team won the Group II state title in 1979 (defeating West Orange High School in the final match of the tournament), 1980 (vs. West Orange), 2004 (vs. Governor Livingston High School), 2008 (vs. Pascack Hills High School), 2009 (vs. Pascack Hills), 2010 (vs. Governor Livingston), 2011 (vs. Holmdel High School), 2012 (vs. Pascack Hills) and 2013 (vs. Holmdel), and won the Group I title in 1982 (vs. Metuchen High School), 1983 (opponent not specified), 1987 (vs. Verona High School), 1988 (vs. Bernards High School), 1989 (vs. Mountain Lakes High School), 1990 (vs. Mountain Lakes), 1991 (vs. Rumson-Fair Haven Regional High School) and 1992 (vs. Mountain Lakes). The program's 20 state title are ranked second in the state and the streaks of seven (in 1987–1993) and six (2008–2013) consecutive titles are tied for second- and fourth-longest in the state. The team won the inaugural Tournament of Champions in 1980 (defeating runner-up Millburn High School in the finals), in 2009 (vs. Westfield High School) and 2012 (vs. Millburn). The 1987 team won the Group I title, defeating Highland Park High School in the semifinals by 5–0 and Verona by 4–1 in the finals. In 2007, the girls' tennis team won the South Jersey, Group II state sectional championship with a 4–1 win over Haddon Township High School in the tournament final.

The boys tennis team won the Group I state championship in 1983 (defeating runner-up Mountain Lakes High School in the final match of the tournament), 1984 (vs. Mountain Lakes), 1985 (vs. Highland Park High School), 1986 (vs. Mountain Lakes), 1987 (vs. Highland Park), 1991 (vs. Cresskill High School), 1992 (vs. Mountain Lakes), 1994 (vs. Rumson-Fair Haven Regional High School) and 2015 (vs. Mountain Lakes); and the Group II title in 2011 (vs. Bernards High School) and 2014 (vs. Holmdel High School). The program's 11 championships are ranked ninth in New Jersey. The boys' tennis team won the 2007 South, Group II state sectional championship with a 4–1 win over Sterling High School.

The boys soccer team won the Group I state title in 1984 (as co-champion with New Providence High School), 1990 (co-champion with David Brearley High School), 1992 (vs. Pompton Lakes High School), 1993 (vs. Waldwick High School), 1997 (vs. Whippany Park High School) and 1998 (vs. Cresskill High School), and won the Group II title in 2005 (vs. Whippany Park High School). The 1990 team fell behind early, but ended the Group I finals as co-champion after a 1–1 tie with Brearley to finish the season with a record of 18–1–3.

The boys track team won the Group I indoor state championship in 1987, 2000–2003, 2010, 2011, 2015 and 2016, and won the Group II title in 2017 and 2019; the program's 11 state titles are ranked fifth in the state. The girls track team won the Group I title in 2000–2002, 2008, 2013, 2014 and 2016 (as co-champion), and won in Group II in 2020; the nine titles won by the girls team is the third-most statewide.

The boys track team won the Group I spring / outdoor track state championship in 1987, and won the Group II title in 2009–2011 and 2015.

The boys track team won the indoor relay Group I state championship in 1989, 1996, 2001, 2002, 2010 and 2014; the seven titles won by the boys team are tied for fourth-most statewide. The girls' team won the indoor relay Group I state championship in 2000, 2001, 2003, 2014 and 2016, and the Group II title in 2017 and 2020; the seven titles won by the girls program is ranked fourth in the state

The girls cross country team won the Group I state championship in 1990, 1993 and 1998, and won the Group II title in 1994, 2005–2008, 2016. The program's eight state titles are tied for sixth-most in New Jersey.

The girls basketball team won the Group I state championship in 1993 and 1994 (vs. North Warren Regional High School both years) and 1998 and 1999 (vs. Bloomfield Tech High School both years) and the Group II state championship in 1997 (defeating West Morris Mendham High School in the tournament final) and 2004 (vs. Chatham High School). The program's six state titles are tied for eighth-most in the state. The 1993 team ran their record to 26–3 after winning the Group I title with 51–46 victory against North Warren in the championship game played at Monmouth College The 1994 team repeated as Group I champion defeating North Warren by a score of 69–46 in the tournament finals. The team won the 1999 Group I state title with a 61–45 win against Bloomfield Tech in the finals of the playoffs and advanced to the Tournament of Champions as the fifth seed, falling to fourth-seed Ewing High School 59–55 in overtime in the first round and finishing the season with a 24–6 record, after Ewing scored a basket with less than a second left in regulation to tie the game.

The girls soccer team won the Group I state title in 1997 (as co-champion with Morris Catholic High School), 2005 (as co-champion with Pascack Valley High School), 2007 (vs. Pascack Hills High School) and 2009 (vs. Mahwah High School). In 2007, the girls soccer team won the South, Group II state sectional championship with a 3–2 win over Woodstown High School in the tournament final. The team moved on to win the Group II state championship with a 1–0 win over Pascack Hills in the championship game played at The College of New Jersey to finish the season with a record of 24–1.

The girls spring / outdoor track team won the Group I state championship in 1998 and 1999, and won the Group II title in 2001, 2004, 2012, 2014, 2015 and 2021; the program's eight group titles are tied for fourth-most in the state.

The football team won the South Jersey Group II state sectional title in 2010, 2013, 2014, 2017 and 2018. In 2017, the sixth-seeded football team finished the season with a 9–3 record and won the South Jersey Group II state sectional championship with a 21–17 win against top-seeded West Deptford High School in the tournament final. The 2018 team finished the season with a 13–0 record, winning the South Jersey Group II state sectional championship with a 23–12 win against Camden High School and defeating Hillside High School by a score of 17–7 in the Group II South / Central Bowl Game. The school's football rivalry with West Deptford High School, which dates back to 1981, was listed at 4th on NJ.com's 2017 list "Ranking the 31 fiercest rivalries in N.J. HS football" and was described as the best rivalry in South Jersey, citing the frequent playoff meetups between the two teams. Haddonfield leads the rivalry with a 27–16–1 overall record as of 2017.

The girls lacrosse team won the Group II state championship in 2018 (defeating Sparta High School in the tournament final) and 2019 (vs. Madison High School), and won the Group I championship in 2021 (vs. Glen Ridge High School) and 2022 (vs. Mountain Lakes High School); the program's four state group titles are tied for seventh in the state.

== Marching band ==
The HMHS Marching Colonials were formed in 1938. In celebration of their 70th anniversary, Haddonfield also hosted a Tournament of Bands Home Show and Competition inviting bands from the area to perform competitively, where Marching Colonials received high marks. In 2008, 2009, and 2010, the band won the Chapter 1A Championship. In 2007 and 2010, the band won the Chapter 1 Sportsmanship Award. as of the fall of 2011, the band has moved up to Group 2A. Their 2011 show is entitled "Reflections", with movements "Reflections of Form", "Reflections of Sound", and "Reflections of Light".

== Exchange schemes ==
- Kasukabe High School, in Kasukabe, Saitama, Japan, made an exchange visit in the summer of 2007.
- Sendai Ikuei Gakuen, in Sendai, Miyagi, Japan, welcomed Haddonfield students in the summers of 2018 and 2023. Additionally, they made visits in 2019 and 2024, with a 5 year pause due to COVID-19.
- Aldegrever Gymnasium, in Soest, Germany, makes exchange visits.
- Leibnizschule Wiesbaden, in Wiesbaden, Germany

== Administration ==
The school's principal is Tammy McHale. Her core administration team includes the assistant principal.

== Building layout ==
The high school consists of three buildings connected by bridges on the upper floors. "A" and "B" buildings have two floors, and "C" building has three.

"A," the original school built in 1926, is rectangular and has an inner courtyard framed by three classical arches. Language, mathematics and other academic subjects are taught here. "A" also contains the auditorium and the smaller of the school's two gyms. "B," the smallest section, includes the cafeteria, the wrestling room, and the larger of the school's two gyms. "C" was added in the 1970s and contains the science department. The music department, including band and choir rooms, is on the lower floor. "C" also contains academic classrooms, a home economics room, and the library.

== Notable alumni ==
- John Adler (1959–2011), politician who served as a U.S. representative for New Jersey's 3rd congressional district from 2009 until his death
- Chris Barrett (born 1982, class of 2001), filmmaker
- Henry Charlton Beck (1902–1965), author, journalist, historian, ordained Episcopal minister and folklorist
- Aimee Belgard (born 1974), lawyer and politician who serves as a judge in New Jersey Superior Court
- Andy Breckman (born 1955), co-writer of the television show Monk
- Joanna Cassidy (born 1945), actress
- Vedra Chandler (born 1980), singer and dancer
- Erin Donohue (born 1983), middle distance runner who competed in the 2008 Summer Olympics in Beijing
- Quaesita Cromwell Drake (1889–1967, class of 1906), chemist who was a professor and chair of the chemistry department at the University of Delaware for 38 years
- John A. Dramesi (1933–2017), United States Air Force Colonel who was held as a prisoner of war from 1967 to 1973 during the Vietnam War, in both Hoa Lo Prison, known as "The Hanoi Hilton", and Cu Loc Prison, "The Zoo"
- Alfred E. Driscoll (1902–1975), Governor of New Jersey
- Kevin Eastman (born 1955), former NBA basketball player, who was Vice President for Basketball Operations of the Los Angeles Clippers
- Rawly Eastwick (born 1950), former Major League Baseball pitcher
- Jena Friedman, comedian, writer and host of the comedic true-crime series Indefensible
- Michael Garvey (born 1988), former rugby league footballer for the Philadelphia Fight in the USA Rugby League, who played for the United States men's national rugby league team at the 2013 World Cup
- Christian Giudice (born 1974, class of 1992), author and journalist whose published works include biographies of boxers Roberto Duran, Alexis Arguello, Wilfredo Gómez and Hector Camacho
- Marielle Hall (born 1992, class of 2010) long-distance runner who competed in the Women's 10,000 meters final at the 2016 Summer Olympics in Rio de Janeiro
- Debra Hill (1950–2005, class of 1968), film producer and screenwriter best known for making the movie, Halloween.
- Ed Keegan (1939–2014), former MLB pitcher who played for the Philadelphia Phillies and Kansas City Athletics
- David Laganella (born 1974, class of 1992), avant-garde classical composer and author
- Joey Loperfido (born 1999, class of 2017), MLB infielder / outfielder for the Houston Astros
- Matt Maloney (born 1971), played in the NBA from 1996 to 2002
- Bob McElwee (born 1935), on-field football official for 41 years with 27 of those years in the National Football League, from 1976 to 2003
- Scott Patterson (born 1958), actor whose most notable role was Luke Danes on the ABC family show Gilmore Girls
- Ryan Roberts (born 1980), former American football defensive end who played for the Notre Dame Fighting Irish football team
- Peter Schwartz (born 1946, class of 1964), futurist, innovator, author and co-founder of the Global Business Network
- Rod Searle (1920–2014, class of 1939), farmer, insurance agent and politician who served for 24 years in the Minnesota House of Representatives
- Jennifer Sey (born 1969), author, business executive and retired artistic gymnast who was the 1986 U.S. Women's All-Around National Champion
- Tom Sims (1950–2012), athlete, inventor and entrepreneur who was World Snowboarding Champion (1983), World Champion Skateboarder (1975) and founder of SIMS Snowboards and SIMS Skateboards
- I. F. Stone (1907–1989), investigative journalist, who graduated 49th of 52 in his class
- Brian Zoubek (born 1988, class of 2006), Duke Blue Devils men's basketball player and 2010 NCAA Men's Division I Basketball Tournament champion
