= Colonial Manor, New Jersey =

Populated place in Gloucester County, New Jersey, US

- Unincorporated community
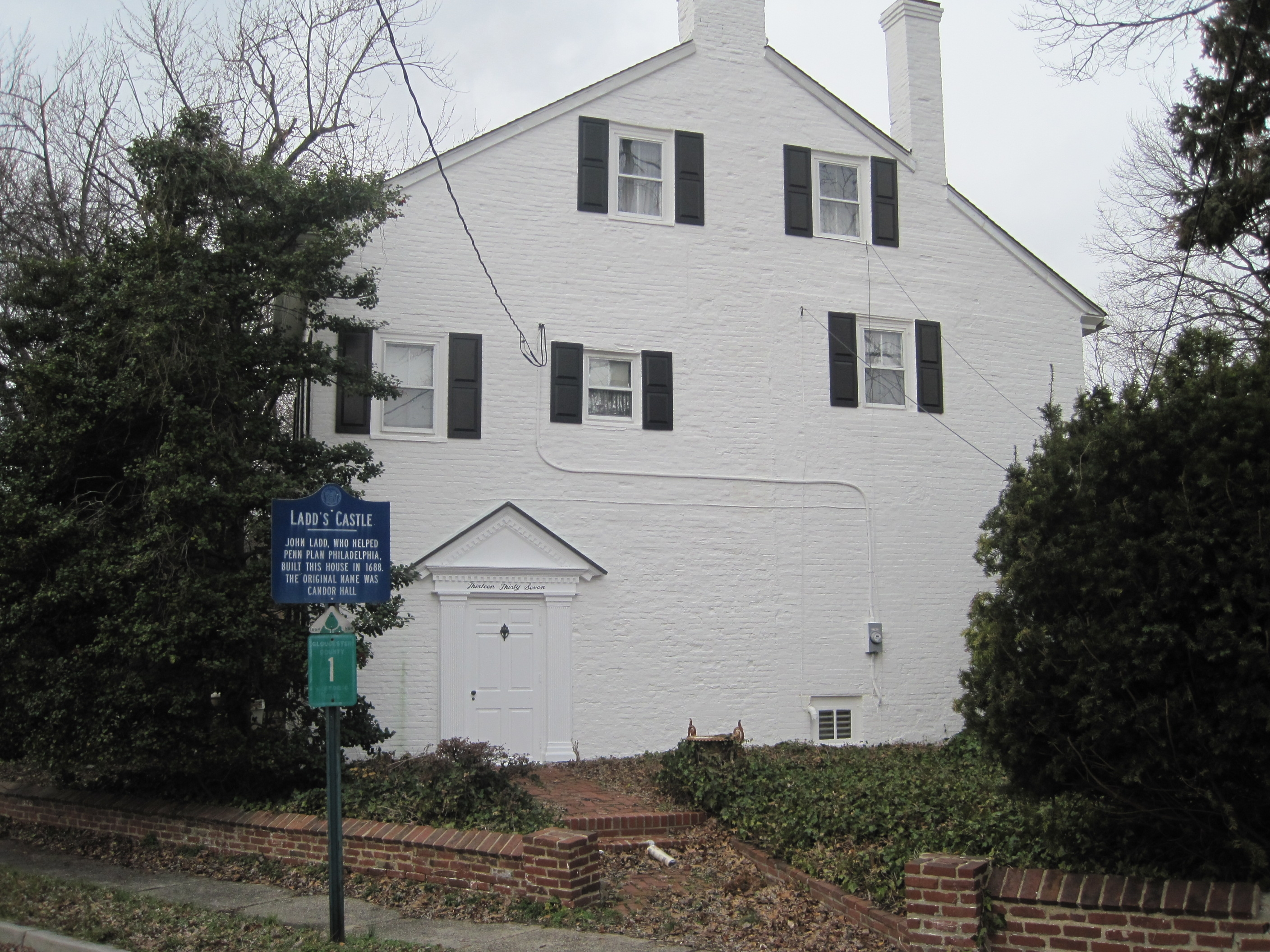
- Ladd's Castle, listed on the NRHP

- Location within Gloucester County, New Jersey Location within New Jersey Location within the United States
- Coordinates: 39°51′18″N 75°9′5″W
- Country: United States
- State: New Jersey
- County: Gloucester
- Township: West Deptford
- Elevation: 377 ft (115 m)
- Time zone: UTC−05:00 (Eastern (EST))
  - Summer (DST): UTC−04:00 (EDT)
- GNIS feature ID: 875572

Colonial Manor is an unincorporated community located within West Deptford Township in Gloucester County, in the U.S. state of New Jersey.

== History ==
Ladd's Castle, also known as Candor Hall, is a historic building located in the Colonial Manor section that is Gloucester County's oldest brick home. Added to the National Register of Historic Places in 1972, it was constructed c. 1688 by John Ladd, a surveyor who is said to have helped William Penn develop a master design for the street grid for Philadelphia.

The Colonial Manor Volunteer Fire Department was established in 1922.
