= Quaesita Cromwell Drake =

American chemist

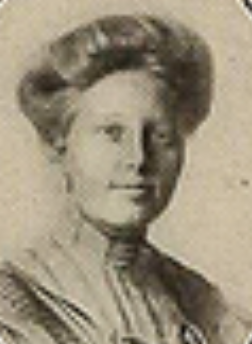
- Quaesita Cromwell Drake, from the 1910 yearbook of Vassar College
- Born: August 29, 1889; Camden, New Jersey, United States
- Died: August 7, 1967 (aged 77); Wilmington, Delaware, United States
- Occupations: Chemist, college professor

Quaesita Cromwell Drake (August 29, 1889 – August 7, 1967) was an American chemist. She was a professor and chair of the chemistry department at the University of Delaware for 38 years, from 1917 until her retirement in 1955. She was elected president of the Delaware chapter of the American Association of University Women in 1924.

== Early life and education ==
Drake was born in Camden, New Jersey and raised in Haddonfield, New Jersey, the daughter of Herbert Armitage Drake and Sacia Hersey Nye Drake. Her father was a lawyer. A graduate of the 1906 class of Haddonfield Memorial High School, she graduated from Vassar College in 1910, and earned a master's degree there in 1911. She completed doctoral studies in organic chemistry at the University of Chicago, with a dissertation advised by Julius Stieglitz, titled "An Investigation of the Possibility of Re-arranging an Acyl-β-alkyl-hodroxylamine" (1922). She was a member of Phi Beta Kappa.

== Career ==
Drake was a member of the faculty at the University of Delaware beginning in 1917 at the Women's College of the university. She was promoted to full professor status in 1920, served as acting dean of the women's college in 1927, and was the college's first chemistry department chair. She was the most senior faculty member with 38 years of teaching when she retired from the university in 1955.

Drake was a charter member and president of the Delaware state chapter of the American Chemical Society, and associate editor of the chapter's publication, the Del-Chem Bulletin. She also served on the national council of the American Chemical Society. She was vice-president of the University of Delaware chapter of Phi Kappa Phi honor society, and president of the Pennsylvania-Delaware section of the American Association of University Women (AAUW).

== Personal life ==
Drake died in 1967, in Wilmington, Delaware, at the age of 77. The Quaesita Drake Scholarship Fund was endowed in her memory. In 1973, Quaesita Drake Hall, a chemistry teaching laboratory, was dedicated to the campus of the University of Delaware. Her papers are in the University of Delaware Archives.
