= Climate of Florida =

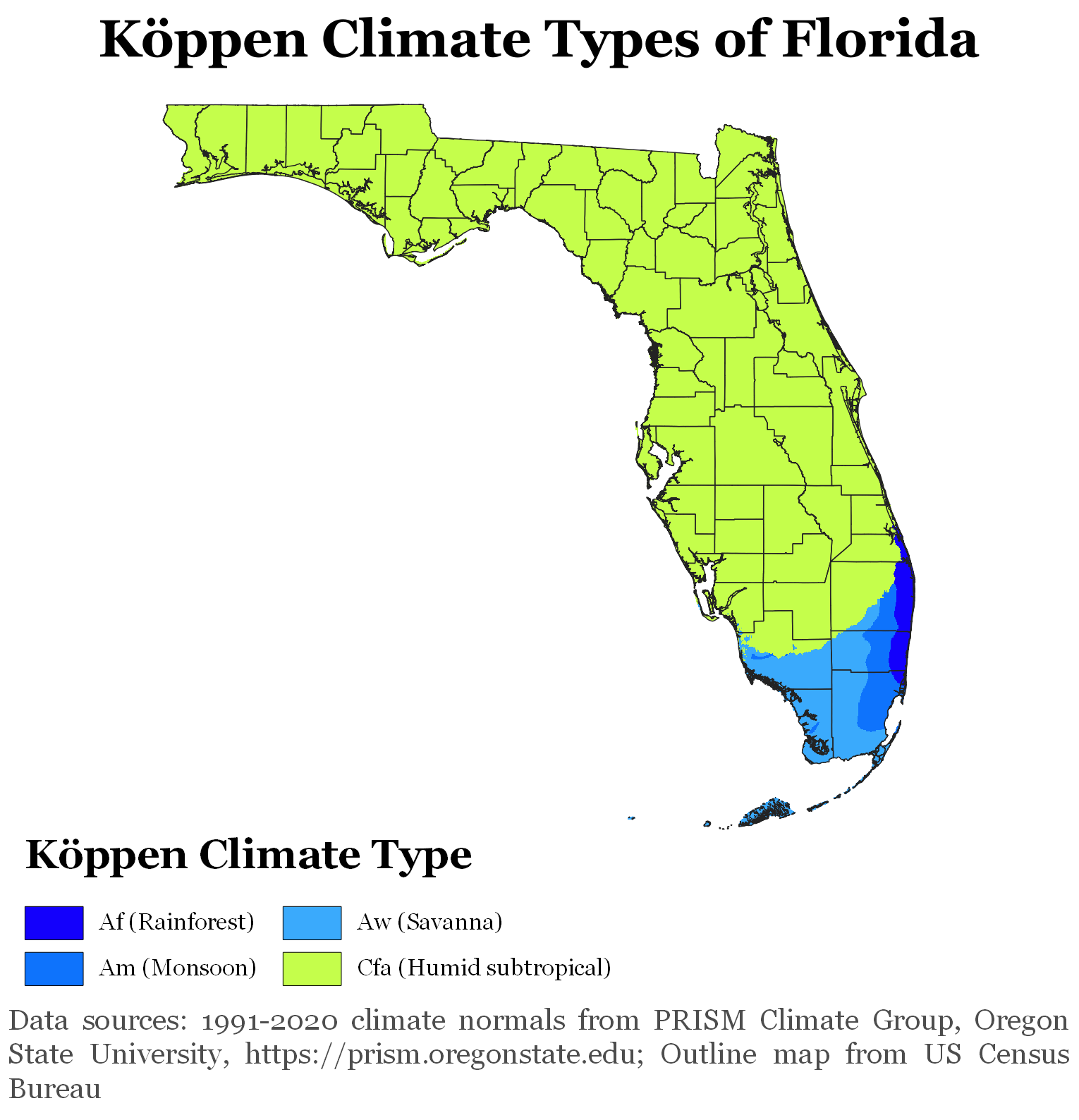
Köppen climate types of Florida, using 1991-2020 climate normals.

The climate of the north and central parts of the U.S. state of Florida is humid subtropical. South Florida has a tropical climate. Over the past decade, Florida's average June temperature has risen to about 81.5 °F (27.5 °C), compared to just 79.9 °F (26.6 °C) for the same month over the long-term period since 1895; additionally, June temperatures have risen by approximately 2 °F compared to 50 years ago. A 2024 peer-reviewed study found that locations in the Florida Peninsula and Keys have experienced increases of more than 1.5 extreme autumn heat-stress days per decade since the 1950s, with the largest trends observed in coastal urban areas. There is also a defined rainy season from May through October when air-mass thundershowers that build in the heat of the day drop heavy but brief summer rainfall. The dew point in West Central and Southwest Florida can range from 30°F or below in the winter to 80°F or above in the summer.

In October, the dry season sets in across much of Florida (starting early in the month in northern Florida and near the end of the month in deep southern Florida) and lasts until late April most years. Fronts from mid-latitude storms north of Florida occasionally pass through northern and central parts of the state which bring light and brief winter rainfall. Mid and late winter can become severely dry in Florida. In some years the dry season becomes quite severe and water restrictions are imposed to conserve water. Predicting these changes is essential for farming, construction, and tourism.

FAWN, the Florida Automated Weather Network, provides accurate weather predictions. This system is useful for determining current weather and predicting how Florida's climate will change. While most areas of Florida do not experience any type of frozen precipitation, northern Florida can see fleeting snow or sleet a few times each decade.

The USDA Hardiness Zones for the state range from Zone 8B (15–20 °F (−9 – −7 °C)) in the extreme northwestern panhandle, to Zone 12A (50–55 °F (10–13 °C)) in the lower Florida Keys.

The Gulf Stream running through the Florida Straits and then north along the eastern Florida coast keeps temperatures moderate a few miles inland from around Stuart on the east coast to Fort Myers on the west coast of the state year-round, with few extremes in temperature. The tropical ocean current also provides warm sea surface temperatures, giving Florida beaches the warmest ocean surf waters on the United States mainland. Florida's geography also makes it vulnerable to the effects of climate change, both in the intensification of extreme weather such as intensified hurricanes as well as coastal flooding and other effects of sea level rise.

== Pressure ==
The low pressure measured from an extratropical cyclone was 28.84 inches/976.7 hPa during the Storm of the Century. From a tropical cyclone, the lowest pressure measured was 26.35 inches/892 hPa in the Florida Keys during the Labor Day Hurricane of 1935. The highest known pressure measured statewide was 30.74 inches/1041.1 hPa in Tallahassee on February 5, 1996, and January 4, 1979.

== Wind ==
Over the winter prevailing winds are out of the north across the panhandle south to near Orlando, but are variable in the rest of the state. The summer season sees generally east and southeast winds across the peninsula. During the summer months, the average wind pattern implies a surface ridge axis which normally lies across central Florida, with easterly winds from Tampa southward and southwest winds across northern Florida. The peak wind gust during the 1930 through 1997 period was 185 kilometres per hour (115 miles per hour) at Miami International Airport during Hurricane Andrew.

=== African dust outbreaks ===
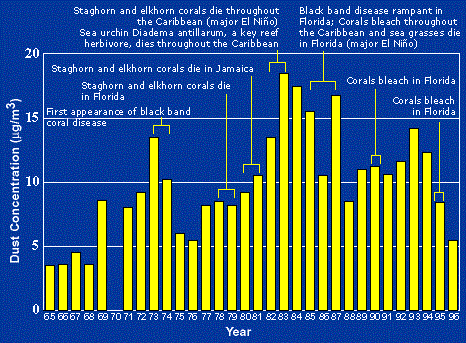

In July, the trade winds south of the northward-moving subtropical ridge expand northwestward into Florida. On occasion, dust from the Sahara moving around the southern periphery of the ridge moves into the state, suppressing rainfall and changing the sky from a blue to a white appearance and leading to an increase in red sunsets. Its presence negatively impacts air quality across the Southeastern United States during the summer, by adding to the count of airborne particulates. This is in sharp contrast to the normally clean air over Florida and the southeastern USA, which on average is the cleanest air in the USA. Over 50% of the African dust that reaches the United States affects Florida. Since 1970, dust outbreaks have worsened due to periods of drought in Africa. There is a large variability in the dust transport to the Caribbean and Florida from year to year. Dust events are possibly linked to a decline in the health of coral reefs across the Caribbean and Florida, primarily since the 1970s.

== Seasonal climate patterns ==
=== Winter ===
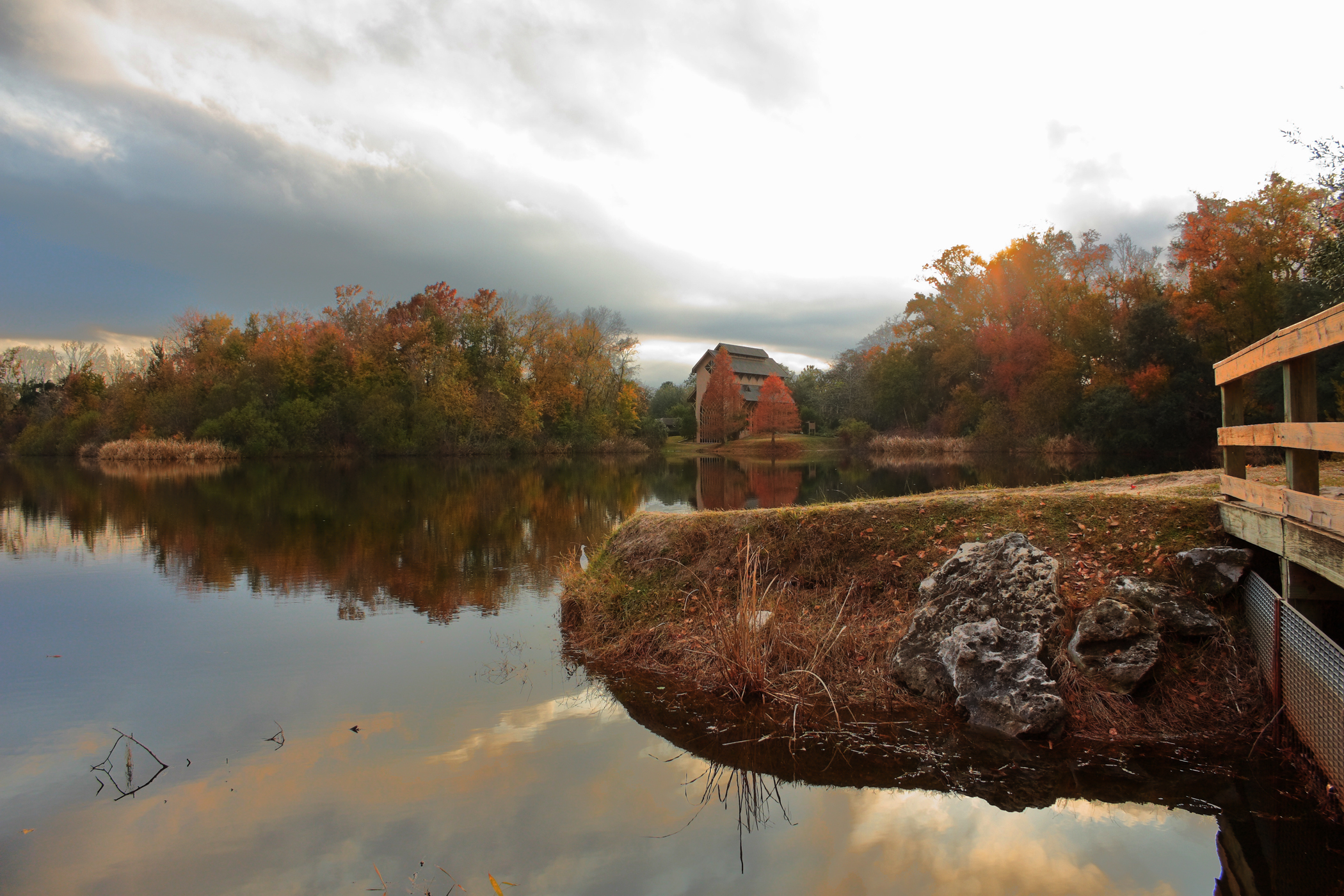
Fall foliage in North Central Florida.

On average, Florida has the mildest winters in the continental United States. Average lows range from 65 °F (18 °C) in Key West to nearly 41 °F (5 °C) in Tallahassee, while daytime highs range from 17 °C (62 °F) in Tallahassee to 25 °C (77 °F) in Miami. Predominant tropical easterly winds across central and southern Florida keep temperatures warm during the winter. Occasional strong cold fronts move southward down the peninsula with freezing or near-freezing temperatures on a few nights into inland areas of central Florida every few years. A few times each decade, Miami might see a winter nightfall below 7 °C (45 °F). El Niño winters are cooler due to increased cloud cover but have fewer freezes.

Although rare in south Florida, sub-freezing temperatures can happen and have large impacts. A field experiment in Key Largo Florida found that these cold climates reduced fruit removal by the Key Largo woodrat, slowing down the seed dispersal process most likely caused by these weather conditions.

Five hardiness zones exist. USDA Zone 12A, the warmest zone found within the state, with average extreme annual lows between 10 °C (50 °F) to 13 °C (55 °F), is found in the Dry Tortugas area. USDA Zone 11B, with average annual lows between 7 °C (45 °F) and 10 °C (50 °F), is found between Key West and Marathon. USDA Zone 11A, with average annual lows between 4 °C (40 °F) and 7 °C (45 °F), is found in the remaining Florida Keys, Miami Beach, Homestead, and parts of downtown Miami. USDA Zone 10B, with average annual lows between 2 °C (35 °F) and 4 °C (40 °F), is found in coastal South Florida and much of the Everglades. USDA Zone 10A, with annual average lows between −1 °C (30 °F) and 2 °C (35 °F), is found in the rest of South Florida, and in certain coastal regions as far north as St. Petersburg on the western coast of the state, and roughly Vero Beach on the eastern coast of the state. USDA Zone 9B, with average annual lows between −4 °C (25 °F) and −1 °C (30 °F), is found in interior Central Florida, continuing north towards Fernandina Beach. USDA Zone 9A, with average annual lows between −7 °C (20 °F) and −4 °C (25 °F), is found along an area stretching from Ocala to Pensacola. USDA Zone 8B, the coolest zone found within the state, with average annual lows between −9 °C (15 °F) and −7 °C (20 °F), is located in extreme northwestern Florida along the northern portions of Escambia, Santa Rosa, Okaloosa, Walton, and Holmes counties.

Florida has experienced 12 major freezes. This includes four "impact" freezes, sufficiently severe to kill entire groves of citrus trees, resulting in a noticeable economic impact on citrus growers and prompting them to shift groves further southward. These impact freezes are indicated by asterisks in the following: Great Freeze of 1894-1895*, February 13–14, 1899, February 2–6, 1917, December 12–13, 1934, January 1940, December 12–13, 1957, December 12–13, 1962*, January 18–20, 1977, January 12–14, 1981, December 24–25, 1983*, January 20–22, 1985, and December 22–26, 1989*.

Despite being the mildest on average, the winter climate was a crucial contributing factor of the Challenger disaster on January 28, 1986, in which overnight temperatures at Titusville, adjacent to the Kennedy Space Center, had dropped as low as 24 °F (−4 °C) and were still below freezing at 28.0 °F (−2.2 °C) to 28.9 °F (−1.7 °C) on launch day. The severe cold had caused the O-Rings on the right-side SRB to crack, as they had only a redline tolerance of 4 °C (39 °F)

=== Summer ===
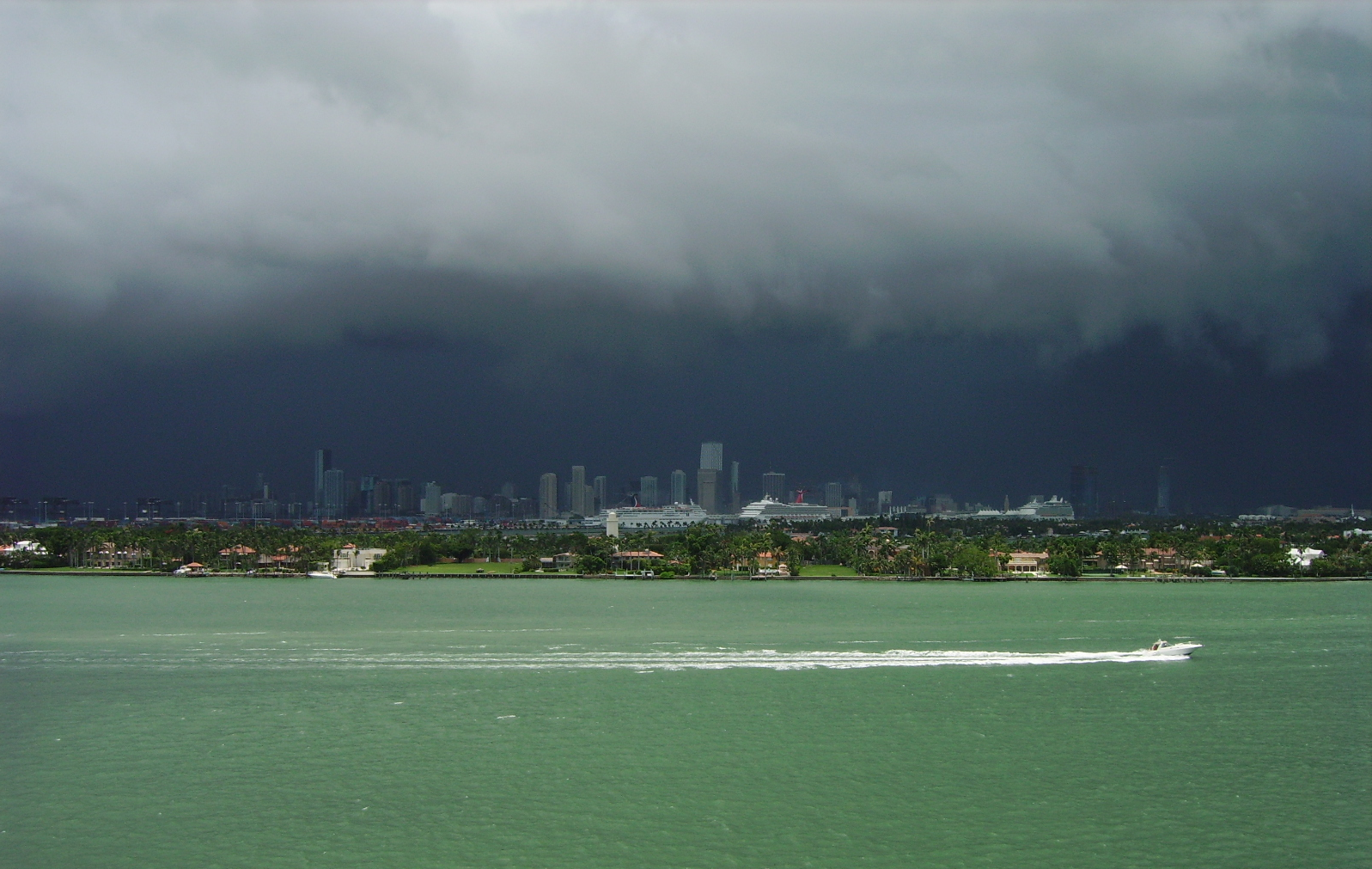
Typical summer afternoon shower from the Everglades travelling eastward over Downtown Miami.

During the summer, average high temperatures range from near 95 °F (35 °C) in northern Florida to near 90 °F (32 °C) in the Keys. Maximum temperatures during the summer average in the higher 90s Fahrenheit statewide. Heat indexes can easily reach 39–43 °C (103–110 °F). Relief from the heat during the summer comes in the form of afternoon and evening thunderstorm activity, late morning and afternoon sea breezes off the relatively cooler ocean, and during the passage of a tropical cyclone. The record high temperature for the state is 109 °F (43 °C) at Monticello in 1931. It is estimated that in 2026, the heat index could rise to about 131 degrees Fahrenheit, according to local agriculture workers, which could lead to unexpected outcomes, such as health complications.

== Fog ==
Like the rest of the Southeastern United States, Florida has a winter maximum in dense fog. Unlike the rest of the region, the maximum in Florida accounts for roughly half of the annual occurrences. Its summer minimum is less than the remainder of the Southeast. The annual number of heavy fog days (with visibility of .25 miles (0.40 km) or less) has ranged from 50 in Tallahassee to 1 in Key West, the least foggy region in the state. The two most common types of fog in Florida are advection and radiational. Fog can be hazardous to early morning commuters. On January 9, 2008, when fog on Interstate 4 combined with smoke from a nearby fire, visibility was reduced to nearly zero. As a result, five individuals died in a 70-car pileup.

== Precipitation ==
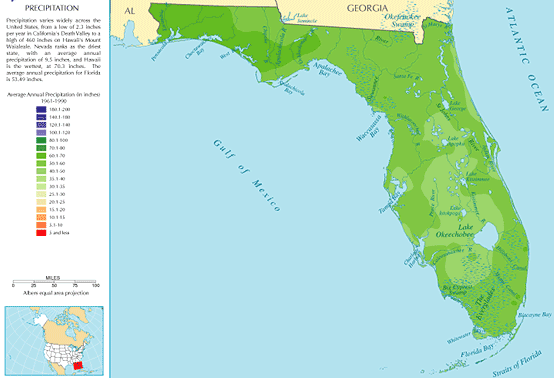
Average rainfall for Florida

=== Averages ===
Statewide, the highest rainfall amounts occur during the summer months. In northern Florida, there is a weak winter secondary maximum while statewide the driest months of the year are during the spring. During El Niño, Florida sees greater rainfall between November and March. Due to the lack of the secondary maximum across the peninsula, a distinct dry season is seen in the averages from winter through spring. This dry season provokes brush fires annually as temperatures rise in late spring, before they fade in early June as the rainy season gets underway.

=== Extremes ===
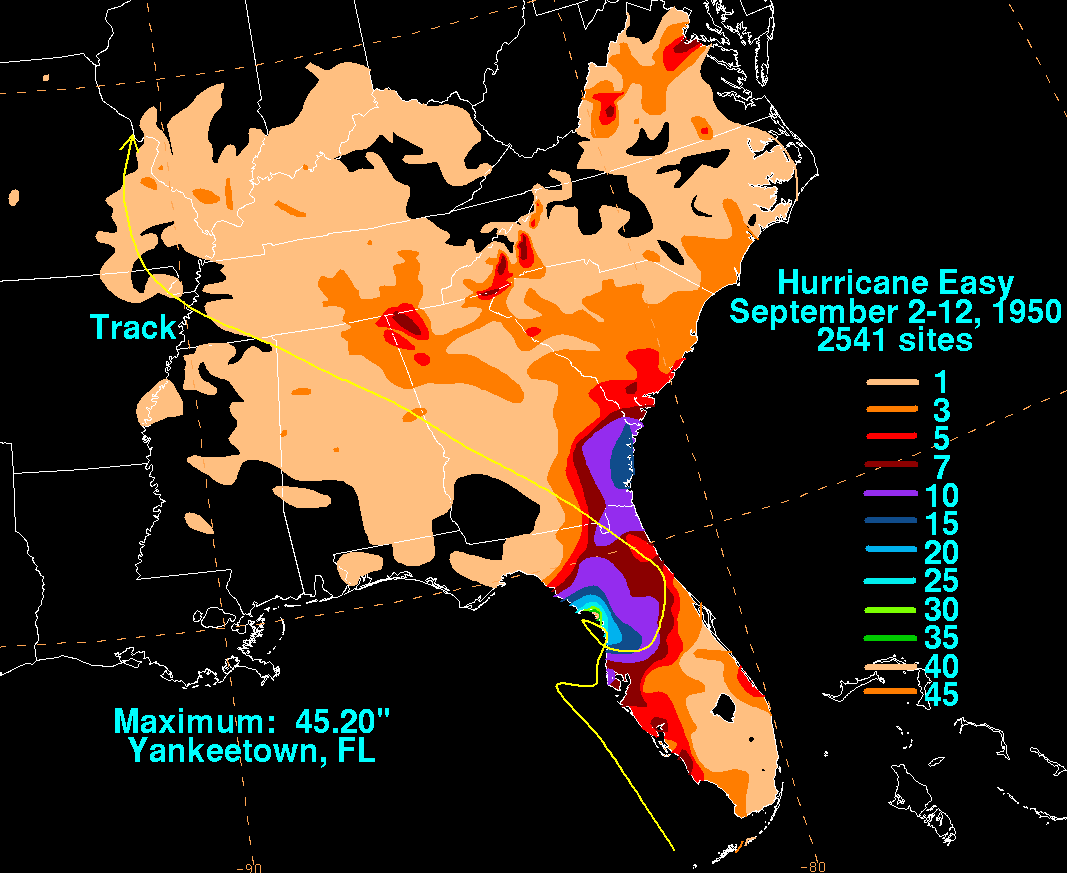
Hurricane Easy's Rainfall across the Southeastern United States

The heaviest rainfall to occur in 24 hours was measured in Yankeetown during Hurricane Easy, 45.20 inches (1,148 mm). This is also the highest known point storm total maximum related to any tropical cyclone which has impacted Florida, and by itself would be the highest known rainfall total for any month from any location within Florida. This rainfall amount remained the national 24-hour rainfall record until Tropical Storm Claudette (1979). Heavy rainfall events have fallen due to stalled fronts near the state as well, and occur during the March through May and October through November timeframe.

The wettest month recorded at a Florida climate station was during May 1891 when Gainesville, Florida received 30.90 inches (785 mm). The wettest year on record for a Florida climate station was during 1879 when 127.24 inches (3,232 mm) fell at Pensacola, Florida. The driest year for a climate station statewide was during 1974 when only 19.99 inches (508 mm) fell at Key West.

One of the worst years for wildfires was in 1998, at the end of an El Niño cycle. 480 wildfires consumed 500,000 acres (2,000 km^{2}; 200,000 ha) statewide. In 2010, the National Weather Service issued more fire alerts in Florida than anywhere else in the nation.

A statewide drought began in November 2005, one month after Hurricane Wilma's passage through the state, and persisted until 2009. The previous significant drought occurred in 2000, which was the state's driest year on record.

In July 2023, ocean temperatures in Florida reached up to 101.1 °F (38.4 °C) at a NOAA (National Oceanic and Atmospheric Administration) monitored station in Manatee Bay, Florida, one of the highest sea surface temperatures ever measured in the region.

=== Snowfall ===
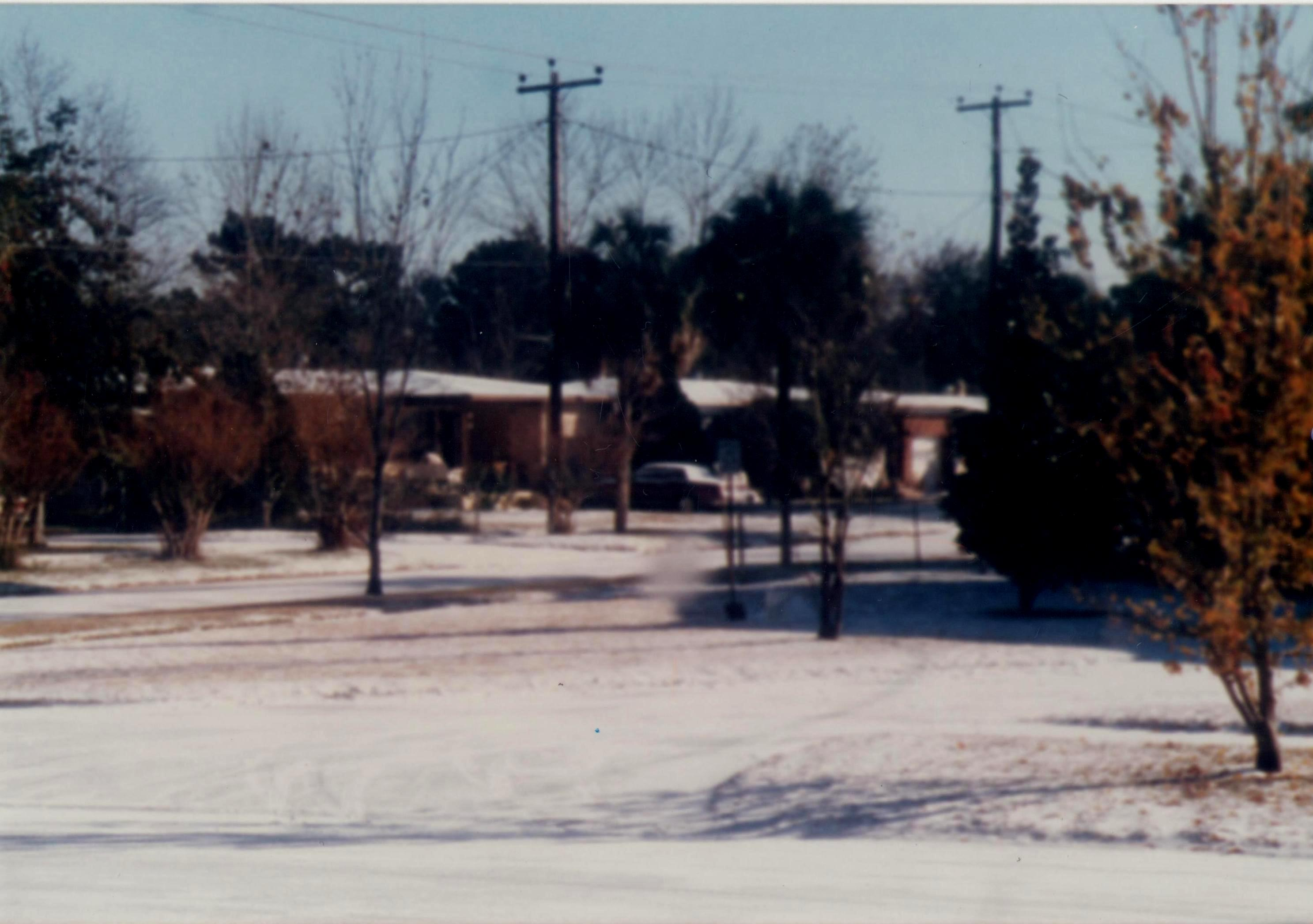
Snow in Jacksonville on December 23, 1989

Snowfall is rare in Florida. The earliest recorded occurrence of snow or sleet occurred in 1774 in the far northern portion of the state. The latest occurrence of snow or sleet fell on January 21–22, 2025, as a major winter storm affected much of the Gulf Coast of the United States. Cities such as Pensacola saw record-breaking snow accumulations.

The state record for snowfall is 9.8 inches (25 cm), set in Milton, Florida during the 2025 Gulf Coast blizzard. The earliest in the season that frozen precipitation has fallen was during the Late November 2006 Nor'easter on November 21 across central Florida. The latest in the season that snow or sleet has fallen was on April 8, 2007. Snow flurries have been reported in the air (not on the ground) as far south as Homestead, during a January 19, 1977, event.

== Ecosystems responses to climate ==
Florida's ecosystem undergoes significant transformations in response to a changing climate, including the expansion of mangrove forests along its extensive coastlines. As sea levels rise, mangroves migrate northward and start to replace salt marshes. Sea level rising is one of the most certain consequences of climate change. Caused factors such as ocean warming and ice sheets melting. Mangroves are extremely beneficial by stabilizing shorelines and reducing flood damage, ultimately saving billions in coastal protection costs. Mangroves reduced flood depths by up to 1.5 meters (4.9 ft) and avoided up to 50% of property losses in certain coastal areas during storm surge events. The expansion and protective role of mangroves explains how Florida's ecosystems are actively responding to climate change.

In addition to mangrove expansion, Florida also experiences shifts in vegetation zones due to climate change. As winters become milder, tropical species move northward, a process known as tropicalization. Parts of the southernmost United States will 'tropicalize" as climate changes, with cold-sensitive plants and animals moving northward due to fewer, weaker winter freezes.

== Ecosystem protection and natural defenses ==
Additional research shows that mangrove forests reduce flood depths and property losses by absorbing storm-surge energy, though their effectiveness varies across coastlines. These discoveries highlight the value of mangrove conservation and restoration as a cost-effective natural defense against climate-driven flooding in Florida.

== Effects on biodiversity ==
Changes in Florida's climate, including precipitation patterns and rising temperatures, have a severe effect on biodiversity. These changes can pose risks to habitats, threatening the abundance of plant and animal species.

== Impact on tourism ==
Tourism, one of Florida's most economically vital sectors, faces growing challenges from climate change. Increasing temperatures, stronger hurricanes, and worsening coastal erosion are already altering visitor patterns and threatening coastal infrastructure. Studies of Florida's coastal destinations highlight that adaptation measures such as resilient building design and improved beach management will be essential to sustain the state's tourism economy in a warming climate.

== Health effects of Florida's climate ==
Not only does Florida's climate affect biodiversity, but it can also negatively affect humans. Florida's changing climate contributes to a number of health concerns, particularly increased diseases and heat-related illnesses. Rising temperatures have been linked to an increase in mosquito-borne diseases such as dengue and West Nile virus. Health authorities anticipate that with warmer temperatures, increased humidity, and changing precipitation, diseases such as dengue may grow more prevalent.

Additionally, Florida's climate has also increased the risk of heat-related illnesses. After analyzing data, daily heat exposure, measured by both temperature and heat index, has the strongest relationship with heat-related illness statewide. As both measures of exposure increased, rates of heat-related illness increased significantly.

== Health consequences of extreme heat ==
Florida's health agencies have also documented a long-term rise in heat-related hospitalizations and fatalities during the summer months. Urban regions, particularly in South and Central Florida, experience more common and severe heat waves due to the urban heat island effect, while rural areas often lack enough cooling resources and medical infrastructure. Public health officials warn that this imbalance highlights increasing vulnerabilities between urban and rural populations as Florida's summers continue to warm.

== Vector-borne disease and climate ==
Warmer average temperatures and longer rainy seasons have lengthened mosquito breeding cycles, leading to rising dengue fever and other mosquito-borne diseases in South Florida. Health officials note that dengue has become part of a "new normal" driven by sustained humidity and changing rainfall patterns that favor mosquito proliferation.

== Thunderstorms ==
Florida reports more thunderstorms than any other US state. Some places report in excess of 90 thunderstorm days per year, making Florida one of the most thundery regions outside of the tropics. Florida receives the highest density of lightning strikes within the United States. Several deaths per year are blamed on lightning, making lightning one of the deadliest weather-related phenomenon in the state. However, since 1992, the number of lightning deaths has been slowly dropping despite a rising population, suggesting that lightning awareness programs are effective. The most likely targets of lightning strikes are construction workers and others who work outside, though 12 percent of the cases occurred indoors to people using electronic devices. Severe thunderstorms can sometimes produce hail, very strong straight line winds and tornadoes. Very heavy rainfall from thunderstorms can result in flash flooding. Thunderstorms occur most often during the summer but can occur at any time of the year. During the rainy season, storms often focus around the inland moving seabreezes as cooler air from the coast uplifts warmer air inland causing localized instability. These seabreezes from the Gulf and Atlantic often collide over the peninsula sometimes producing severe weather with small hail and winds.

== Tornadoes ==
Florida has the most tornadoes per square mile than any other state. However, these tornadoes tend to be much weaker and short-lived than in other states like the Midwest or Deep South. Strong tornadoes do occasionally form in Florida, usually in conjunction with a cold frontal passage in the winter or spring. A total of 42 people died in February 1998 from the deadliest such tornado outbreak in Central Florida, which occurred during the nighttime hours. Tornado outbreaks may also happen when tropical cyclones are passing near or over the state. The most recent of these was from Hurricane Milton which caused many severe EF3 tornadoes and lead to 6 fatalities. While tornadoes in the Midwest are more severe, a higher rate of deaths are experienced in Florida, and Brevard County, specifically, due to higher population density and quantity of manufactured homes. Waterspouts are very common over coastal waters with the Keys experiencing more than anywhere else in the world. These may sometimes make landfall as shortlived landspout tornadoes.

== Tropical cyclones ==
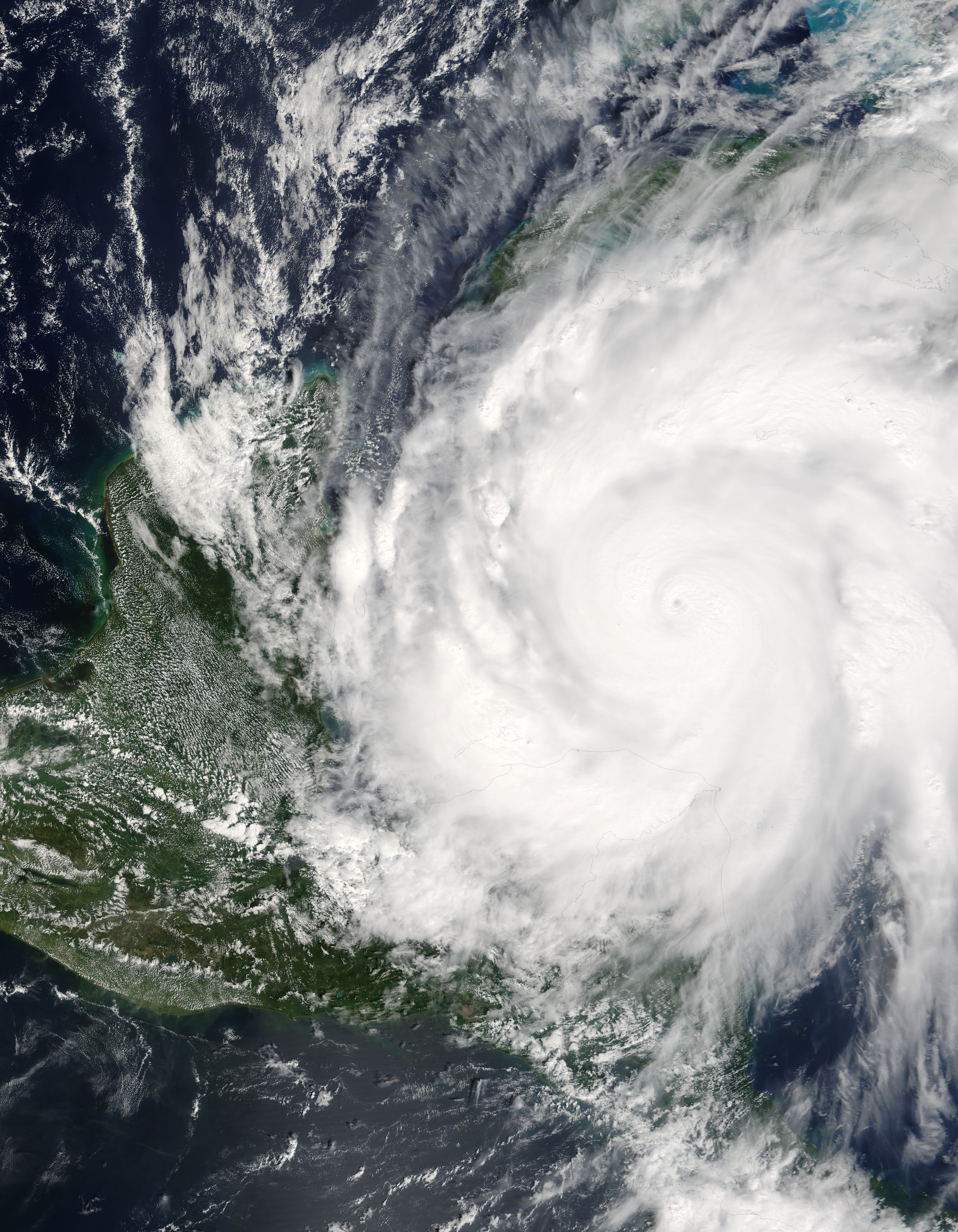
Hurricane Wilma (2005)

The earliest in the year a tropical cyclone has struck the sunshine state was the Groundhog Day Tropical Storm in 1952. The latest in the year hurricane struck near Tampa on December 1, 1925. The strongest hurricane to strike Florida was the Labor Day Hurricane of 1935. The cost of climate disasters has grown in the last 50 years, according to NOAA. In more recent history, Hurricane Ian (2022) was the deadliest hurricane to hit Florida since 1935. In September 2024, Hurricane Helene came ashore near Perry as a Category 4 storm with winds of about 140 mph (225 km/h), the most powerful hurricane on record to make landfall in Florida’s Big Bend region. Hurricane Easy in 1950 produced the wettest known point total from any tropical cyclone. The record number of hurricane strikes on the state in one season is four in 2004. Hurricanes typically spawn tornadoes within their northeast quadrant.

Tropical cyclones have affected Florida in every month of the year but January and March. Nearly one-third of the cyclones affected the state in September, and nearly three-fourths of the storms affected the state between August and October, which coincides with the peak of the hurricane season. Portions of the coastline have the lowest return period, or the frequency at which a certain intensity or category of hurricane can be expected within 86 miles (138 km) of a given location, in the country. Monroe County was struck by 26 hurricanes since 1926, which is the greatest total for any county in the United States. The costs of these storms have increased over the years. Florida has been affected by many devastating hurricanes in its history. This has caused over $450 billion in damage. Recent studies highlight how complex climate events—such as concurrent hurricanes, floods, and storm surges—intensify social and financial losses across South Florida. These overlapping hazards have increased destruction to homes, infrastructure, and utilities, compounding recovery costs that far exceed those from single events.

== Effect of climate cycles ==
El Niño has the following effects on Florida climate: above average rainfall in the spring. This is followed by wildfire threat when rain dries up. Northern Florida is more susceptible to severe weather; below normal temperatures, increased number of low pressure systems in the Gulf of Mexico during the winter, and "almost always" reduces the frequency of storms and hurricanes.

La Niña has the following effects: often dry conditions prevail in late fall, winter and early spring, increased risk of wildfires in spring and summer months, the temperatures average slightly above normal, and the chance of hurricane activity increases substantially.

Long term forecasts are made based on these effects. However, they are easily overridden, in winter, by the Arctic oscillation and North Atlantic oscillations, which can only be predicted about two weeks in advance. These can drop the temperature noticeably from seasonal norms.

== Climates of selected Florida cities ==
The climate regime for much of the state is humid subtropical (Köppen Cfa), though the Miami Metropolitan Area, southwest Florida from Fort Myers southward, and all of the Florida Keys, qualify as tropical. Florida counties with tropical climates include Miami-Dade, Broward, Palm Beach, Lee, Collier, and Monroe counties. A narrow eastern part of the state including Orlando and Jacksonville receives between 2,400 and 2,800 hours of sunshine annually. The rest of the state, including Miami, receives between 2,800 and 3,200 hours annually.

Pensacola, Florida

Climate chart (precipitation, max. and min. temperature)
J	F	M	A	M	J	J	A	S	O	N	D
5.3 61 43	4.7 64 45	6.4 70 52	3.9 76 58	4.4 83 66	6.4 89 72	8 91 75	6.9 90 74	5.8 87 70	4.1 79 60	4.5 70 51	4 63 45
- █ Average max. and min. temperatures in °F
- █ Precipitation totals in inches
- Source: NOAA
Metric conversion
J	F	M	A	M	J	J	A	S	O	N	D
136 16 6	119 18 7	163 21 11	99 25 14	112 29 19	162 32 22	204 33 24	174 32 23	146 31 21	105 26 15	113 21 11	101 17 7
- █ Average max. and min. temperatures in °C
- █ Precipitation totals in mm

Tallahassee, Florida

Climate chart (precipitation, max. and min. temperature)
J	F	M	A	M	J	J	A	S	O	N	D
4.4 64 40	4.9 67 42	5.7 73 47	3.7 80 53	4.3 87 62	7.1 91 69	8.3 92 72	7.3 91 72	5.4 88 69	3.2 81 57	3.3 72 47	4.2 66 41
- █ Average max. and min. temperatures in °F
- █ Precipitation totals in inches
- Source: Florida Climate Center
Metric conversion
J	F	M	A	M	J	J	A	S	O	N	D
111 18 4	123 19 5	145 23 9	95 27 12	108 30 17	181 33 21	210 33 22	186 33 22	138 31 20	81 27 14	85 22 8	106 19 5
- █ Average max. and min. temperatures in °C
- █ Precipitation totals in mm

Jacksonville, Florida

Climate chart (precipitation, max. and min. temperature)
J	F	M	A	M	J	J	A	S	O	N	D
3 65 43	3.4 68 45	3.7 74 50	2.8 80 56	3.4 86 64	6 90 70	6.6 92 73	7.2 91 73	7.8 87 70	3.9 80 61	1.9 73 51	2.6 67 44
- █ Average max. and min. temperatures in °F
- █ Precipitation totals in inches
- Source: Florida Climate Center
Metric conversion
J	F	M	A	M	J	J	A	S	O	N	D
77 18 6	87 20 7	94 23 10	72 27 13	86 30 18	152 32 21	167 33 23	184 33 23	199 31 21	100 27 16	48 23 10	66 19 7
- █ Average max. and min. temperatures in °C
- █ Precipitation totals in mm

Orlando, Florida

Climate chart (precipitation, max. and min. temperature)
J	F	M	A	M	J	J	A	S	O	N	D
2.4 71 49	2.4 74 52	3.8 78 56	2.6 83 60	3.5 88 66	7.6 91 72	7.3 92 74	7.1 92 74	6.1 90 73	3.3 85 66	2.2 78 59	2.6 73 52
- █ Average max. and min. temperatures in °F
- █ Precipitation totals in inches
- Source: NOAA
Metric conversion
J	F	M	A	M	J	J	A	S	O	N	D
60 22 10	60 23 11	96 26 13	65 28 16	88 31 19	193 33 22	185 33 23	181 33 23	154 32 23	84 29 19	55 26 15	66 23 11
- █ Average max. and min. temperatures in °C
- █ Precipitation totals in mm

Daytona Beach, Florida

Climate chart (precipitation, max. and min. temperature)
J	F	M	A	M	J	J	A	S	O	N	D
2.7 68 47	2.8 71 50	4.2 75 54	2.2 79 59	3.1 85 65	5.8 88 71	5.8 90 73	6.4 90 73	7 87 72	4.2 82 66	2.7 76 58	2.6 71 51
- █ Average max. and min. temperatures in °F
- █ Precipitation totals in inches
- Source: Florida Climate Center
Metric conversion
J	F	M	A	M	J	J	A	S	O	N	D
70 20 9	71 22 10	108 24 12	55 26 15	80 29 19	148 31 22	148 32 23	163 32 23	177 31 22	107 28 19	68 24 14	67 21 10
- █ Average max. and min. temperatures in °C
- █ Precipitation totals in mm

Tampa, Florida

Climate chart (precipitation, max. and min. temperature)
J	F	M	A	M	J	J	A	S	O	N	D
2.3 70 52	2.7 72 54	2.8 76 59	1.8 81 62	2.9 86 69	5.5 89 74	6.5 90 75	7.6 90 75	6.5 89 74	2.3 84 68	1.6 78 61	2.3 72 55
- █ Average max. and min. temperatures in °F
- █ Precipitation totals in inches
- Source: Florida Climate Center
Metric conversion
J	F	M	A	M	J	J	A	S	O	N	D
58 21 11	68 22 12	72 25 15	46 27 17	72 30 21	140 32 23	165 32 24	193 32 24	166 32 24	58 29 20	41 26 16	58 22 13
- █ Average max. and min. temperatures in °C
- █ Precipitation totals in mm

Miami, Florida

Climate chart (precipitation, max. and min. temperature)
J	F	M	A	M	J	J	A	S	O	N	D
1.8 76 60	2.1 77 61	2.5 80 64	3.2 83 68	5.9 86 72	9.3 88 75	6.2 90 77	8 90 77	9.1 88 76	7 85 72	2.9 81 68	2 77 62
- █ Average max. and min. temperatures in °F
- █ Precipitation totals in inches
- Source: Florida Climate Center
Metric conversion
J	F	M	A	M	J	J	A	S	O	N	D
46 24 15	54 25 16	63 27 18	81 28 20	150 30 22	237 31 24	158 32 25	202 32 25	231 31 24	177 30 22	74 27 20	50 25 17
- █ Average max. and min. temperatures in °C
- █ Precipitation totals in mm

Key West, Florida

Climate chart (precipitation, max. and min. temperature)
J	F	M	A	M	J	J	A	S	O	N	D
2 75 65	1.6 76 66	1.7 79 69	1.8 82 72	3.1 85 76	4.6 88 78	3.7 89 80	5.3 90 79	6.6 88 78	5 85 76	2.5 80 71	2 76 67
- █ Average max. and min. temperatures in °F
- █ Precipitation totals in inches
- Source: Florida Climate Center
Metric conversion
J	F	M	A	M	J	J	A	S	O	N	D
50 24 18	41 24 19	42 26 20	46 28 22	78 30 24	117 31 26	94 32 26	135 32 26	166 31 26	128 29 24	63 27 22	52 25 19
- █ Average max. and min. temperatures in °C
- █ Precipitation totals in mm

== See also ==
- Climate change in Florida
