= Ladd's Castle =

Historic house in New Jersey, United States

- U.S. National Register of Historic Places
- New Jersey Register of Historic Places
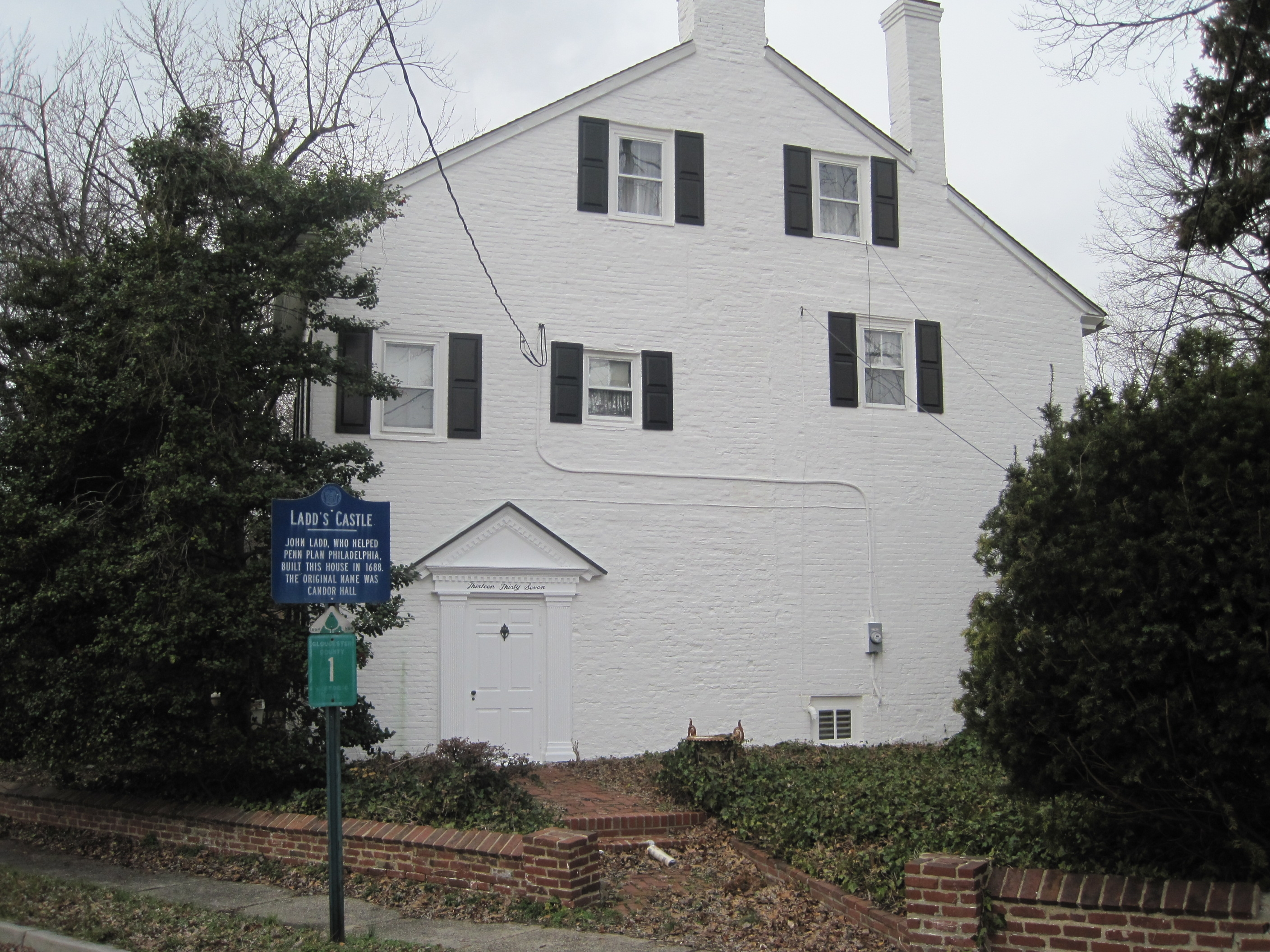
- Candor Hall

- Location within Gloucester County, New Jersey Location within New Jersey Location within the United States
- Location: 1337 Lafayette Avenue, West Deptford Township, New Jersey, U.S.
- Coordinates: 39°51′24.2″N 75°8′36.4″W
- Built: c. 1688
- NRHP reference No.: 72000794
- NJRHP No.: 1425

Significant dates
- Added to NRHP: October 31, 1972
- Designated NJRHP: March 15, 1972

Ladd's Castle, also known as Candor Hall, is a historic house located at 1337 Lafayette Avenue in the Colonial Manor section of West Deptford Township in Gloucester County, New Jersey. It was added to the National Register of Historic Places on October 31, 1972, for its significance in architecture and urban planning.

== History and description ==
The house was constructed c. 1688, by John Ladd, a surveyor who purportedly helped William Penn in planning the organization of Philadelphia. The two-story patterned brick house features Flemish bond with glazed headers. According the nomination form, it is the oldest brick house in the county. The house was renovated 1947–1948.

== See also ==
- National Register of Historic Places listings in Gloucester County, New Jersey
- List of the oldest buildings in New Jersey
