= West Deptford High School =

School district in Gloucester County, New Jersey, US

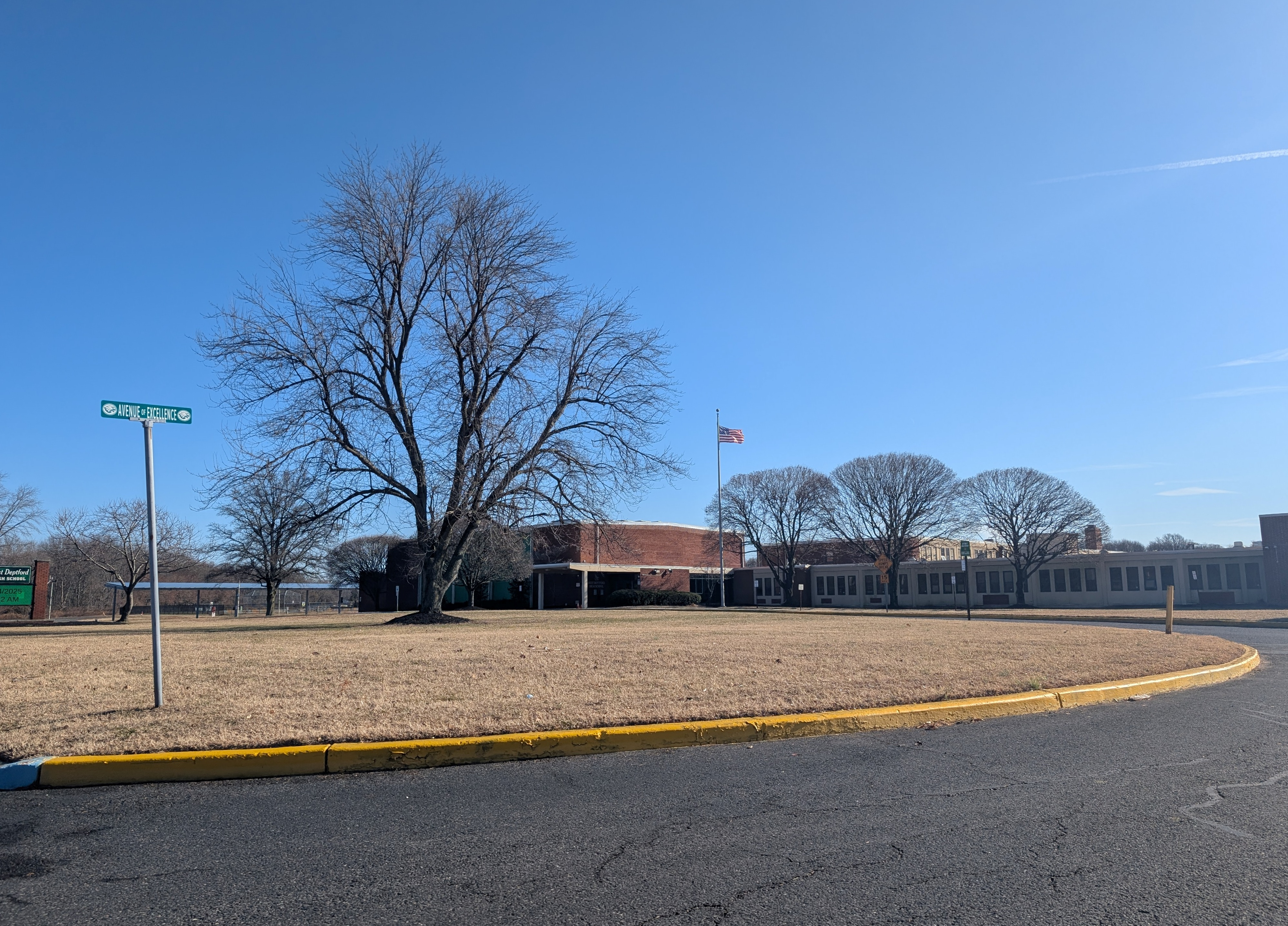
- West Deptford High School, December 2025

Location
- 1600 Old Crown Point Road; West Deptford Township, Gloucester County, New Jersey 08093; United States; 39.856401°N 75.16177°W

Information
- Type: Public high school
- Motto: "Building Excellence and Success Through Teamwork"
- Established: 1960
- School district: West Deptford Public Schools
- NCES School ID: 341743002662
- Principal: Jason Morrell
- Faculty: 71.4 FTEs
- Grades: 9-12
- Enrollment: 754 (as of 2023–24)
- Student to teacher ratio: 10.6:1
- Colors: Green white and black
- Athletics conference: Colonial Conference (general); West Jersey Football League (football)
- Team name: Eagles
- Rival: Haddonfield Memorial High School
- Newspaper: The Talon
- Yearbook: Aquila
- Website: hs.wdeptford.k12.nj.us

West Deptford High School is a comprehensive community public high school that serves students in ninth through twelfth grades from West Deptford Township, in Gloucester County, in the U.S. state of New Jersey. It is the sole secondary school of the West Deptford Public Schools.

As of the 2023–24 school year, the school had an enrollment of 754 students and 71.4 classroom teachers (on an FTE basis), for a student–teacher ratio of 10.6:1. There were 187 students (24.8% of enrollment) eligible for free lunch and 39 (5.2% of students) eligible for reduced-cost lunch.

== History ==
In August 1958, the district approved a proposal for the construction of a junior/senior high school on a site covering 50 acres (20 ha) that would cost a projected $2.5 million (equivalent to $27.9 million in 2025). The school opened for ninth-grade students in 1960 and had its first graduating class four years later. Formal dedication ceremonies for the school, which could handle a maximum enrollment of nearly 1,450 students, were held in December 1960.

== Awards, recognition and honors ==
The school was the 152nd-ranked public high school in New Jersey out of 339 schools statewide in New Jersey Monthly magazine's September 2014 cover story on the state's "Top Public High Schools", using a new ranking methodology. The school had been ranked 219th in the state of 328 schools in 2012, after being ranked 182nd in 2010 out of 322 schools listed. The magazine ranked the school 185th in 2008 out of 316 schools. The school was ranked 170th in the magazine's September 2006 issue, which surveyed 316 schools across the state.

== Athletics ==
West Deptford High School Eagles compete as a member school in the Colonial Conference, which is comprised of small schools whose enrollments generally do not exceed 800 students for grades 9-12, and operates under the supervision of the New Jersey State Interscholastic Athletic Association. With 603 students in grades 10-12, the school was classified by the NJSIAA for the 2022–24 school years as Group II South for most athletic competition purposes. The football team competes in the Constitution Division of the 94-team West Jersey Football League superconference and was classified by the NJSIAA as Group II South for football for 2024–2026, which included schools with 514 to 685 students. The school competes in Varsity Tier II of the South Jersey High School Ice Hockey League, a high school ice hockey league with 20 teams participating at the varsity level from South Jersey.

The boys' soccer team was Group II co-champion with Madison High School in 1982 and won the Group III title vs. Scotch Plains High School in 1985. The 1982 team was declared as Group II co-champion after a 1–1 tie in the finals with Madison. In 1999, the soccer team earned the South, Group III sectional title with a 2–0 win against Moorestown High School. In 2012, the soccer team won the South Jersey Group II sectional title with a 4–1 win in penalty kicks after a 2–2 tie in the tournament final against Cinnaminson High School.

The girls swimming team won the Division B state championship in 1984.

The field hockey team won the South Jersey Group II state sectional title in 1994, 1996, 2003, 2009, 2013–2019 and won the South Group I title in 2022 and 2023; the team won the Group II state championship in 1996 (defeating Warren Hills Regional High School in the tournament final) and won the Group I state title in 2022 and 2023 (vs. Shore Regional High School both years). The team won the South Jersey, Group II state sectional in 2003 with a 3–2 win over Camden Catholic High School in the final game, avenging a 2–1 loss the previous year against the same team.

The boys' wrestling team won the South Jersey Group II state sectional title in 1996, 2000, 2010, 2019 and 2020; the team won the Group II state championship in 2000. The team won the 2000 Group III state championship, edging North Hunterdon High School 25–24 in the semifinal match and defeating Sparta High School 34–28 in the finals. The boys' wrestling team took the South Jersey, Group III sectional title in 2000 with a 37–23 win in the tournament final against Oakcrest High School. In the 2009-10 wrestling season, the Eagles won a South Jersey Group II Title. Then beat 10th-ranked David Brearley High School in the state semi-finals before losing to second-ranked Long Branch High School in the finals and finished ranked 12th in the state.

The 1996 softball team finished the season with a 24–6 record after winning the Group II state championship. The team won the semifinals against Carteret High School in 14 innings and went on to win the championship with a 6-5 extra-inning victory against Arthur L. Johnson High School in the tournament final after falling behind in the ninth, tying the game and then going on to win in the bottom of the tenth inning.

The football team won the South Jersey Group II state title in 2002–2004, 2007, 2011, 2012 and 2016. The football team won the South, Group II state sectional championship in 2002 edging Buena Regional High School 21–20 in the tournament final. The team repeated in 2003 with a 17–12 win against Overbrook High School in the tournament final. The team won for a third consecutive year in 2004 with a 42–20 victory over Point Pleasant Boro High School. The Eagles went on to win the Group II state championship a fourth time in 2007 with a 31–17 victory over Point Pleasant Boro High School. The team won the 2016 South Jersey Group II state sectional championship, finishing the season with a 12–0 record as they defeated Cedar Creek High School by a final score of 19–13 in the tournament final. The school's football rivalry with Haddonfield Memorial High School, which dates back to 1981, was listed at 4th on NJ.com's 2017 list "Ranking the 31 fiercest rivalries in N.J. HS football" and was described as the best rivalry in South Jersey, citing the frequent playoff meetups between the two teams. Haddonfield leads the rivalry with a 27–16–1 overall record as of 2017.

The boys track team won the Group II spring / outdoor track state championship in 2014.

The baseball team won the Group II state championship in 2016, defeating Parsippany High School by a score of 2–1 in the tournament final.

== Marching band ==
The school's marching band currently competes in the Tournament of Bands Chapter One circuit in size Group 2 (26-50 musicians) The band's current director is Thomas Kershaw Jr.

TOB Competitive History (2002–2022)
Year	Theme	Group	ACC Rank	ACC Score	Chapter Rank	Chapter Score
2022	DRAWN IN	2	2	96.20	1	94.70
2021	KALEIDOSCOPE	2	1	96.20	1	95.70
2019	ELYSIUM	2	1	98.70	1	96.25
2018	DISTORTED	2	2	97.50	1	96.75
2017	El Corazón	2	1	97.40	1	97.30
2016	The New World	2	1	97.90	1	95.65
2015	To The Heavens	2	1	98.65	1	96.30
2014	ICE-SOLATION	3	1	96.75	1	96.45
2013	Parisian Portraits	2	1	96.90	2	94.05
2012	Expressions of Elegance	2	1	97.65	2	94.00
2011	From Twilight 'til The Dawn	3	1	96.55	1	94.45
2010	Dynasty: Reflections Of China	3	1	96.95	1	95.25
2009	American Voices	3	4	94.20	1	91.55
2008	Seascapes	3	3	94.65	1	92.95
2007	On The Edge	3	3	96.25	1	94.10
2006	Nocturnal Images	3	2	96.80	1	94.35
2005	Time	3	5	94.65	2	94.55
2004	Masters of Melody	2	6	93.30	2	92.05
2003	Scenes From The Russian Ice Palace	2	18	87.00	4	90.15
2002	Spanish Fire	1	19	83.95	4	86.75

In 2017 WDMB broke the record for the most consecutive ACC wins, previously held by the Middle Township Marching Band with 7 consecutive wins from 1997 to 2003. However WDMB's consecutive winning streak was broken in 2018 by the Huntingtown Marching Band, who won first place by 0.25 points.

WDMB was ToB Chapter 1 Champion in group 2B in 1978

== Administration ==
The school's principal is Jason Morrell, whose core administrative team includes three assistant principals.

== Notable alumni ==
- MJ Iraldi (born 2001, class of 2020), professional basketbal player who was NCAA Division II men's basketball player of the year in 2025
- Steve Rammel (born 1968, class of 1986), retired U.S. soccer forward who played two seasons in Major League Soccer
- Anthony Scirrotto (born 1986, class of 2005), former football player in the National Football League
