= West Deptford Public Schools =

School district in Gloucester County, New Jersey, US

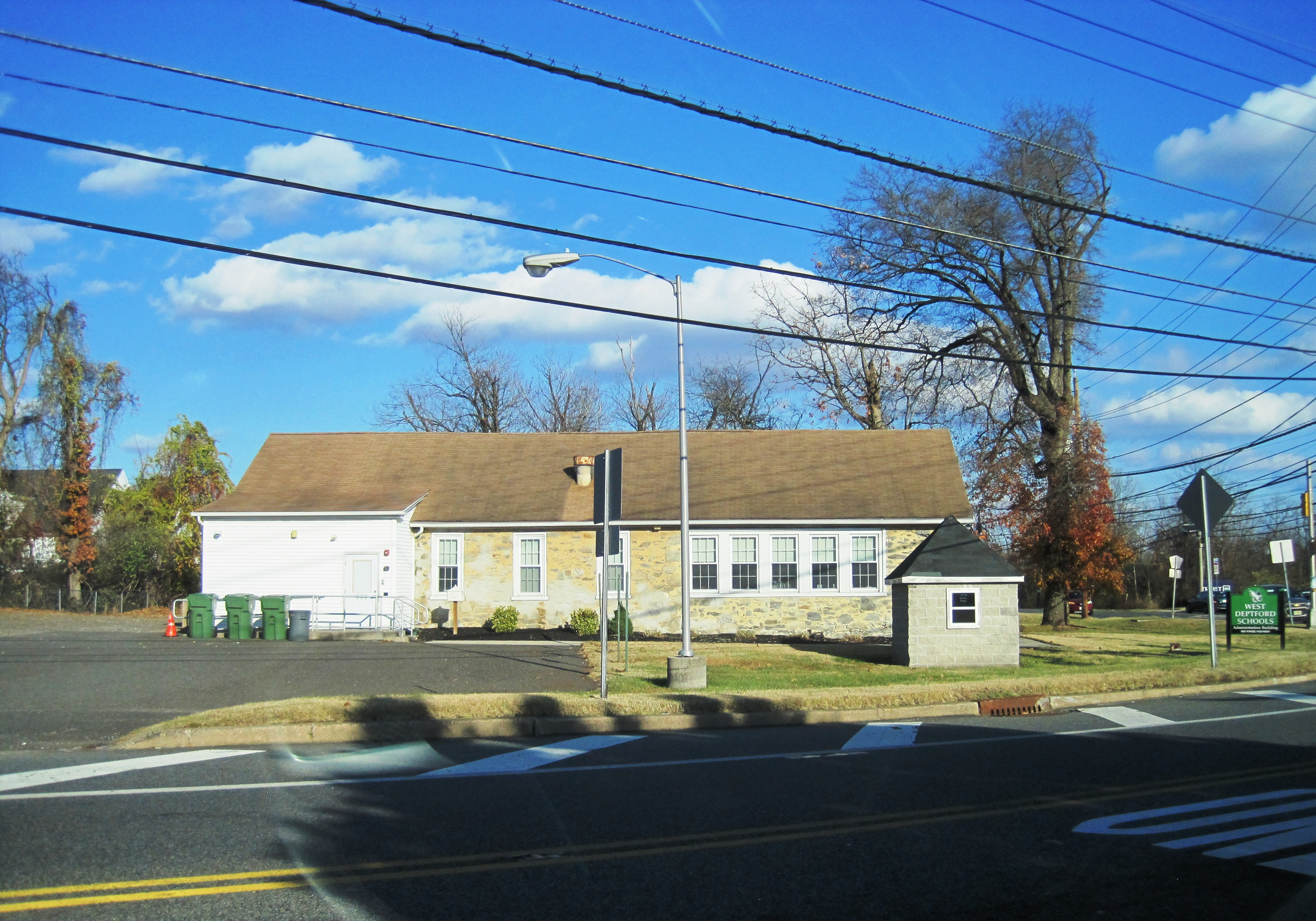
- District administrative building

Address
- 999 Kings Highway West Deptford Township, Gloucester County, New Jersey, 08066; United States
- Coordinates: 39.81727°N 75.19295°W

District information
- Grades: PreK-12
- Superintendent: Brian C. Gismondi
- Business administrator: Steven Jakubowski
- Schools: 5

Students and staff
- Enrollment: 2,947 (as of 2021–22)
- Faculty: 238.5 FTEs
- Student–teacher ratio: 12.4:1

Other information
- District Factor Group: DE
- Website: wdschools.org
Ind.	Per pupil	District spending	Rank (*)	K-12 average	%± vs. average
1A	Total Spending	$15,695	9	$18,891	−16.9%
1	Budgetary Cost	12,527	14	14,783	−15.3%
2	Classroom Instruction	6,872	7	8,763	−21.6%
6	Support Services	2,069	35	2,392	−13.5%
8	Administrative Cost	1,385	18	1,485	−6.7%
10	Operations & Maintenance	1,758	48	1,783	−1.4%
13	Extracurricular Activities	405	41	268	51.1%
16	Median Teacher Salary	68,745	53	64,043
Data from NJDoE 2014 Taxpayers' Guide to Education Spending. *Of K-12 districts with 1,800-3,500 students. Lowest spending=1; Highest=68

The West Deptford Public Schools is a comprehensive community public school district that serve students in pre-kindergarten through twelfth grade from West Deptford Township, in Gloucester County, in the U.S. state of New Jersey.

As of the 2021–22 school year, the district, comprising five schools, had an enrollment of 2,947 students and 238.5 classroom teachers (on an FTE basis), for a student–teacher ratio of 12.4:1.

The district is classified by the New Jersey Department of Education as being in District Factor Group "DE", the fifth-highest of eight groupings. District Factor Groups organize districts statewide to allow comparison by common socioeconomic characteristics of the local districts. From lowest socioeconomic status to highest, the categories are A, B, CD, DE, FG, GH, I and J.

== Schools ==
Schools in the district (with 2021–22 enrollment data from the National Center for Education Statistics) are:

Elementary schools

- Oakview Elementary School with 423 students in grades PreK-1
  - Laura Sandy, principal
- Red Bank Elementary School with 308 students in grade K and 2
  - Jill Scheetz, principal
- Green-Fields Elementary School with 483 students in grades 3-4
  - Karry Corbitt, principal

Middle school

- West Deptford Middle School with 869 students in grades 5-8
  - Jason Morrell, principal

High school

- West Deptford High School with 821 students in grades 9-12
  - Jason Morrell, principal

== Administration ==
Core members of the district's administration are:

- Brian C. Gismondi, Superintendent
- Steven Jakubowski, business administrator and board secretary

== Board of education ==
The district's board of education, comprised of nine members, sets policy and oversees the fiscal and educational operation of the district through its administration. As a Type II school district, the board's trustees are elected directly by voters to serve three-year terms of office on a staggered basis, with three seats up for election each year held (since 2012) as part of the November general election. The board appoints a superintendent to oversee the district's day-to-day operations and a business administrator to supervise the business functions of the district.
