= David Laganella =

American composer based in Philadelphia (born 1974)

David Laganella (born 1974) is an American composer based in the city of Philadelphia, Pennsylvania in the United States.

== Formative years and family ==
Raised in Haddonfield, New Jersey, Laganella graduated from Haddonfield Memorial High School in 1992, studied Guitar and Jazz at Berklee College of Music then pursued music composition degrees from New York University and the University of Pennsylvania, where he received his PhD in music composition at the age of 27. He has resided in Woodbury, New Jersey with his wife and their son.

== Career ==
His music has received awards from The American Society of Composers, Authors and Publishers (ASCAP), The Pennsylvania Council on the Arts, The American Composers Orchestra, The Meet the Composer Fund and The American Composers Forum. He currently holds the position of Professor of Music and Department Chair at Wesley College, Delaware.

Laganella is the author of the book, The Composer's Guide to the Electric Guitar (Mel Bay) which is a guide for composers who want to use the instrument in their music.
