= West Deptford Township, New Jersey =

Township in Gloucester County, New Jersey, US

- Township
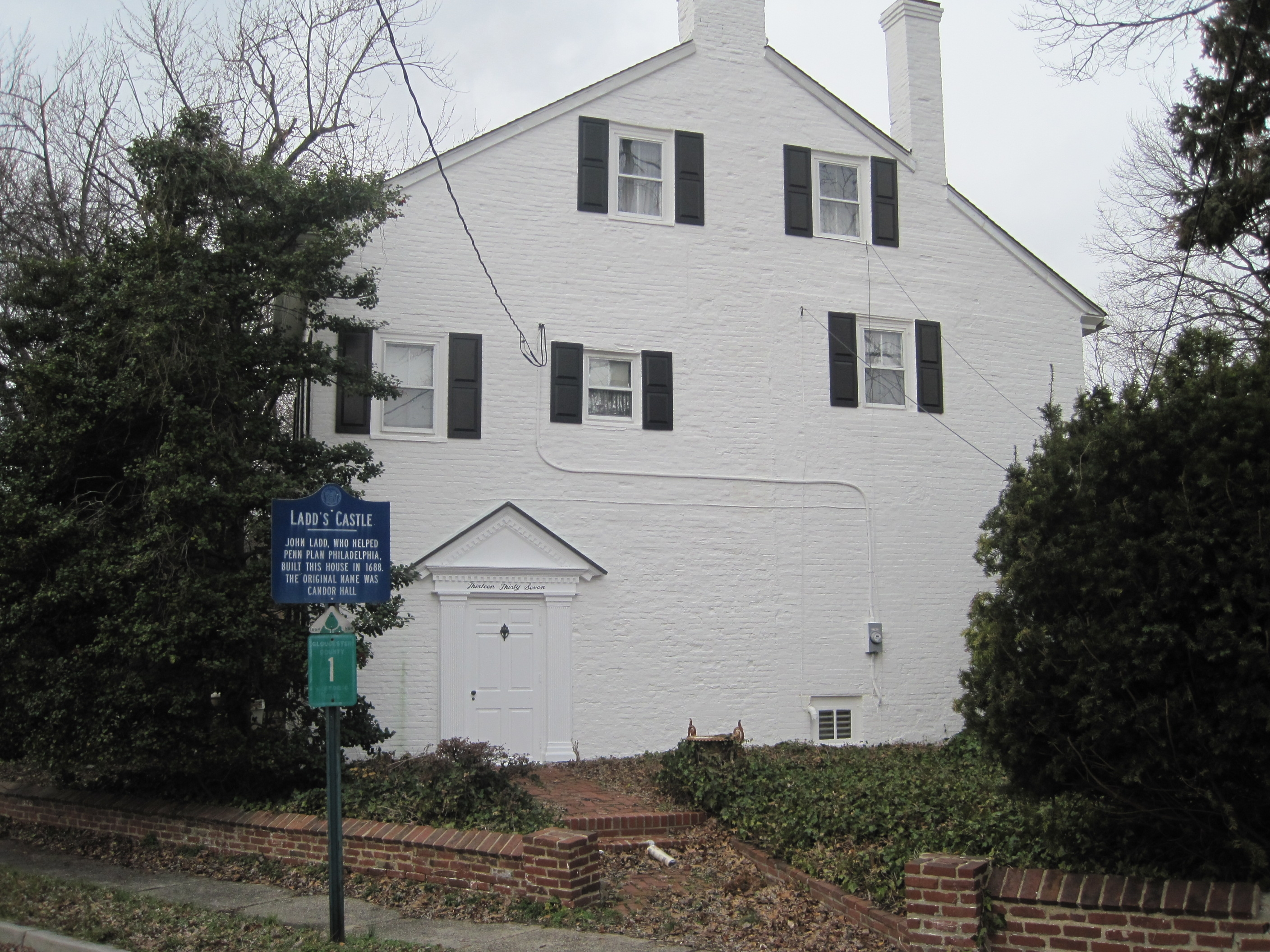
- Ladd's Castle in West Deptford Township, January 2009

- Seal

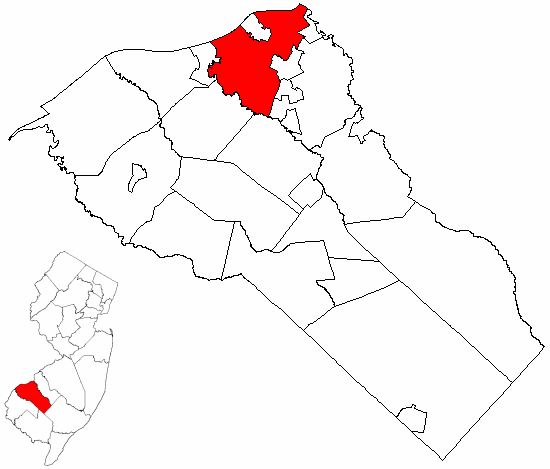
- Location of West Deptford Township in Gloucester County highlighted in red (right). Inset map: Location of Gloucester County in New Jersey highlighted in red (left).

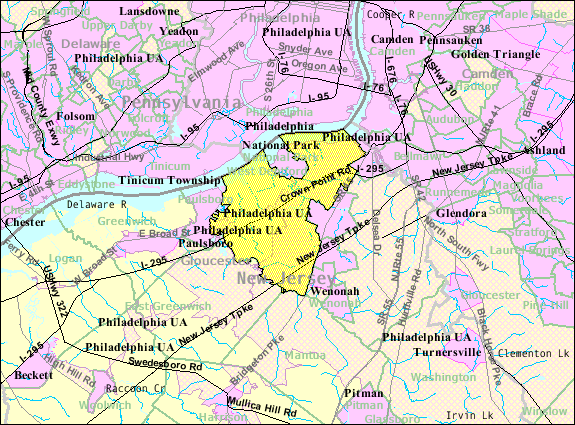
- Census Bureau map of West Deptford Township, New Jersey

- Location in Gloucester County Location in New Jersey Location in the United States
- Coordinates: 39.841967°N 75.185089°W
- Country: United States
- State: New Jersey
- County: Gloucester
- Incorporated: March 1, 1871

Government
  - Type: Township
  - Body: Township Committee
  - Mayor: James P. Mehaffey (D, term ends December 31, 2026)
  - Administrator: Tyler Rost
  - Municipal clerk: Lee Ann DeHart

Area
  - Total: 17.81 sq mi (46.12 km^{2})
  - Land: 15.36 sq mi (39.77 km^{2})
  - Water: 2.45 sq mi (6.35 km^{2}) 13.77%
  - Rank: 161st of 565 in state 8th of 24 in county
- Elevation: 7 ft (2.1 m)

Population (2020)
  - Total: 22,197
  - Estimate (2023): 22,472
  - Rank: 125th of 565 in state 5th of 24 in county
  - Density: 1,445.4/sq mi (558.1/km^{2})
  - Rank: 341st of 565 in state 12th of 24 in county
- Time zone: UTC−05:00 (Eastern (EST))
  - Summer (DST): UTC−04:00 (Eastern (EDT))
- ZIP Code: 08051, 08063, 08066, 08086, 08093, 08096
- Area code: 856
- FIPS code: 3401578800
- GNIS feature ID: 0882148
- Website: www.westdeptford.com

West Deptford Township (pronounced West DEP-ford) is a township in Gloucester County, in the U.S. state of New Jersey. As of the 2020 United States census, the township's population was 22,197, an increase of 520 (+2.4%) from the 2010 census count of 21,677, which in turn reflected an increase of 2,309 (+11.9%) from the 19,368 counted in the 2000 census.

West Deptford Township was formed as a township by an act of the New Jersey Legislature on March 1, 1871, from portions of Deptford Township. Portions of the township were taken to form the boroughs of National Park (April 15, 1902) and Westville (April 7, 1914). Woodbury annexed portions of the township in May 1907.

West Deptford Township was named for the Deptford area of London, located on the River Thames. The township is part of the South Jersey region of the state.

== History ==
Ladd's Castle, also known as Candor Hall, is a historic building located in the Colonial Manor section that is Gloucester County's oldest brick home. Added to the National Register of Historic Places in 1972, it was constructed c. 1688 by John Ladd, a surveyor who helped William Penn lay out a master design for the city of Philadelphia.

== Geography ==
According to the U.S. Census Bureau, the township had a total area of 17.81 square miles (46.12 km^{2}), including 15.36 square miles (39.77 km^{2}) of land and 2.45 square miles (6.35 km^{2}) of water (13.77%).

Unincorporated communities, localities and place names located partially or completely within the township include Colonial Manor, Eagle Point, Greenfields Village, Hoffman Wharf, League Island, Leonards, North Woodbury, Ogens, Paradise, Parkville, Pierces Corner, Red Bank, Tatens, Thorofare, Verga, Washington Park, and West End.

West Deptford Township borders the municipalities of Deptford Township, East Greenwich Township, Mantua Township, National Park, Paulsboro, Westville, Woodbury, and Woodbury Heights in Gloucester County; and Philadelphia and Tinicum Township in Pennsylvania, both located on the western side of the Delaware River.

== Demographics ==
Historical population
Census	Pop.	Note	%±
1880	1,399		—
1890	1,588		13.5%
1900	1,951		22.9%
1910	2,057	*	5.4%
1920	1,781	*	−13.4%
1930	3,956		122.1%
1940	4,336		9.6%
1950	5,446		25.6%
1960	11,152		104.8%
1970	13,928		24.9%
1980	18,002		29.3%
1990	19,380		7.7%
2000	19,368		−0.1%
2010	21,677		11.9%
2020	22,197		2.4%
2023 (est.)	22,472		1.2%
Population sources: 1880–2000; 1880–1920 1880–1890; 1890–1910 1910–1930; 1940–2000 2000; 2010 2020 * = Lost territory on previous decade.

=== 2010 census ===
The 2010 United States census counted 21,677 people, 8,829 households, and 5,757 families in the township. The population density was 1,406.6 inhabitants per square mile (543.1/km^{2}). There were 9,441 housing units at an average density of 612.6 per square mile (236.5/km^{2}). The racial makeup was 88.96% (19,283) White, 6.52% (1,414) Black or African American, 0.12% (25) Native American, 1.91% (415) Asian, 0.01% (3) Pacific Islander, 0.86% (187) from other races, and 1.61% (350) from two or more races. Hispanic or Latino of any race were 3.37% (731) of the population.

Of the 8,829 households, 27.9% had children under the age of 18; 48.5% were married couples living together; 11.8% had a female householder with no husband present and 34.8% were non-families. Of all households, 28.5% were made up of individuals and 10.3% had someone living alone who was 65 years of age or older. The average household size was 2.44 and the average family size was 3.03.

21.6% of the population were under the age of 18, 7.8% from 18 to 24, 26.5% from 25 to 44, 29.7% from 45 to 64, and 14.4% who were 65 years of age or older. The median age was 40.7 years. For every 100 females, the population had 94.0 males. For every 100 females ages 18 and older there were 90.2 males.

The Census Bureau's 2006–2010 American Community Survey showed that (in 2010 inflation-adjusted dollars) median household income was $69,316 (with a margin of error of +/− $3,689) and the median family income was $84,900 (+/− $5,549). Males had a median income of $61,346 (+/− $4,244) versus $47,155 (+/− $4,421) for females. The per capita income for the borough was $33,874 (+/− $1,513). About 4.0% of families and 5.5% of the population were below the poverty line, including 7.6% of those under age 18 and 7.0% of those age 65 or over.

=== 2000 census ===
As of the 2000 U.S. census, there were 19,368 people, 7,719 households, and 5,125 families residing in the township. The population density was 1,218.4 people per square mile (470.3/km^{2}). There were 7,999 housing units at an average density of 503.2 per square mile (194.3/km^{2}). The racial makeup of the township was 92.29% White, 5.08% Black, 0.23% Native American, 1.13% Asian, 0.02% Pacific Islander, 0.42% from other races, and 0.82% from two or more races. Hispanic or Latino of any race were 1.76% of the population.

There were 7,719 households, out of which 30.6% had children under the age of 18 living with them, 51.7% were married couples living together, 10.6% had a female householder with no husband present, and 33.6% were non-families. 27.4% of all households were made up of individuals, and 8.6% had someone living alone who was 65 years of age or older. The average household size was 2.49 and the average family size was 3.07.

In the township, the population was spread out, with 23.5% under the age of 18, 8.2% from 18 to 24, 31.8% from 25 to 44, 24.2% from 45 to 64, and 12.2% who were 65 years of age or older. The median age was 38 years. For every 100 females, there were 93.4 males. For every 100 females age 18 and over, there were 90.1 males.

The median income for a household in the township was $50,583, and the median income for a family was $64,477. Males had a median income of $42,711 versus $30,621 for females. The per capita income for the township was $24,219. About 3.0% of families and 5.3% of the population were below the poverty line, including 4.5% of those under age 18 and 7.5% of those age 65 or over.

== Government ==
=== Local government ===
West Deptford Township is governed under the Township form of New Jersey municipal government, one of 141 municipalities (of the 564) statewide that use this form, the second-most commonly used form of government in the state. The Township Committee is comprised of five members, who are elected directly by the voters at-large in partisan elections to serve three-year terms of office on a staggered basis, with either one or two seats coming up for election each year as part of the November general election in a three-year cycle. At an annual reorganization meeting, the Township Committee selects one of its members to serve as Mayor and another as Deputy Mayor. The Township Committee is the legislative branch of the Township government, developing and adopting ordinances that become the laws of the township.

As of 2025, members of the West Deptford Township Committee are Mayor James P. Mehaffey (D, term on committee ends December 31, 2026; term as mayor ends 2025), Deputy Mayor Adam Reid (D, term on committee ends 2026; term as deputy mayor ends 2025), Megan Kerr (D, 2025), Ashley Morrell (D, 2027) and Jim Robinson (D, 2025).

The pick-up of two seats by Republicans in the 2011 election gave the party control of the Township Committee for the first time since the 1980s.

Republicans Jeff Hansen and Gerald P. Maher won three-year seats in the November 2013 election, giving Republicans a 4–1 edge on the 2014 committee.

In the 2014 election, Democratic challengers James Mehaffey and Adam Reid defeated incumbent Republicans Raymond Chintall and John Keuler Jr., giving the Democrats a 3–2 majority, with the three Democrats choosing as mayor Denice DiCarlo, who had been the lone Democrat in the previous council.

=== Federal, state, and county representation ===
West Deptford Township is located in the 1st Congressional District and is part of New Jersey's 3rd state legislative district.

For the 119th United States Congress, New Jersey's 1st congressional district is represented by Donald Norcross (D, Camden). New Jersey is represented in the United States Senate by Democrats Cory Booker (Newark, term ends 2027) and Andy Kim (Moorestown, term ends 2031).

For the 2026–2027 session, the 3rd legislative district of the New Jersey Legislature is represented in the State Senate by John Burzichelli (D, Paulsboro) and in the General Assembly by David Bailey (D, Woodstown) and Heather Simmons (D, Glassboro).

Gloucester County is governed by a board of county commissioners, whose seven members are elected at-large to three-year terms of office on a staggered basis in partisan elections, with either two or three seats coming up for election each year. At a reorganization meeting held each January, the Board selects a Director and a Deputy Director from among its members. As of 2025, Gloucester County's Commissioners are:

Director Frank J. DiMarco (D, Deptford Township, 2025), Matt Weng (D, Pitman, 2026), Joann Gattinelli (D, Washington Township, 2026), Nicholas DeSilvio (R, Franklin Township, 2027), Denice DiCarlo (D, West Deptford Township, 2025) Deputy Director Jim Jefferson (D, Woodbury, 2026) and Christopher Konawel Jr. (R, Glassboro, 2027).

Gloucester County's constitutional officers are: Clerk James N. Hogan (D, Franklin Township; 2027), Sheriff Carmel Morina (D, Greenwich Township; 2027) and Surrogate Giuseppe "Joe" Chila (D, Woolwich Township; 2028).

=== Politics ===
United States presidential election results for West Deptford Township 2024 2020 2016 2012 2008 2004
Year	Republican		Democratic		Third party(ies)	
Year	No.	%	No.	%	No.	%
2024	5,871	48.45%	6,067	50.07%	179	1.48%
2020	6,035	46.04%	6,885	52.53%	188	1.43%
2016	4,988	46.34%	5,365	49.84%	411	3.82%
2012	4,463	41.66%	6,119	57.11%	132	1.23%
2008	4,468	40.70%	6,351	57.86%	158	1.44%
2004	4,375	43.70%	5,566	55.59%	71	0.71%

As of March 2011, there were a total of 14,703 registered voters in West Deptford, of which 5,661 (38.5%) were registered as Democrats, 2,312 (15.7%) were registered as Republicans and 6,724 (45.7%) were registered as Unaffiliated. There were 6 voters registered as Libertarians or Greens.

In the 2012 presidential election, Democrat Barack Obama received 57.1% of the vote (6,119 cast), ahead of Republican Mitt Romney with 41.7% (4,463 votes), and other candidates with 1.2% (132 votes), among the 10,804 ballots cast by the township's 15,400 registered voters (90 ballots were spoiled), for a turnout of 70.2%. In the 2008 presidential election, Democrat Barack Obama received 57.1% of the vote (6,351 cast), ahead of Republican John McCain with 40.2% (4,468 votes) and other candidates with 1.4% (158 votes), among the 11,119 ballots cast by the township's 15,030 registered voters, for a turnout of 74.0%. In the 2004 presidential election, Democrat John Kerry received 55.3% of the vote (5,566 ballots cast), outpolling Republican George W. Bush with 43.5% (4,375 votes) and other candidates with 0.5% (71 votes), among the 10,065 ballots cast by the township's 13,400 registered voters, for a turnout percentage of 75.1.

Gubernatorial election results for West Deptford Township
Year	Republican		Democratic		Third party(ies)	
Year	No.	%	No.	%	No.	%
2025	4,206	43.93%	5,300	55.35%	69	0.72%
2021	3,768	49.95%	3,698	49.02%	78	1.03%
2017	2,400	38.38%	3,673	58.74%	180	2.88%
2013	4,593	66.32%	2,236	32.29%	96	1.39%
2009	3,077	44.23%	3,212	46.17%	668	9.60%
2005	2,623	40.43%	3,627	55.91%	237	3.65%

In the 2013 gubernatorial election, Republican Chris Christie received 66.3% of the vote (4,593 cast), ahead of Democrat Barbara Buono with 32.3% (2,236 votes), and other candidates with 1.4% (96 votes), among the 7,118 ballots cast by the township's 15,194 registered voters (193 ballots were spoiled), for a turnout of 46.8%. In the 2009 gubernatorial election, Democrat Jon Corzine received 45.4% of the vote (3,212 ballots cast), ahead of Republican Chris Christie with 43.5% (3,077 votes), Independent Chris Daggett with 8.9% (629 votes) and other candidates with 0.6% (39 votes), among the 7,072 ballots cast by the township's 14,879 registered voters, yielding a 47.5% turnout.

United States Senate election results for West Deptford Township1
Year	Republican		Democratic		Third party(ies)	
Year	No.	%	No.	%	No.	%
2024	5,370	45.63%	6,261	53.20%	137	1.16%
2018	3,037	40.89%	4,047	54.48%	344	4.63%
2012	4,001	38.59%	6,122	59.04%	246	2.37%
2006	2,827	41.68%	3,797	55.99%	158	2.33%

United States Senate election results for West Deptford Township2
Year	Republican		Democratic		Third party(ies)	
Year	No.	%	No.	%	No.	%
2020	5,800	44.86%	6,876	53.18%	254	1.96%
2014	2,633	42.25%	3,485	55.92%	114	1.83%
2013	1,623	47.43%	1,762	51.49%	37	1.08%
2008	4,105	39.38%	6,118	58.69%	201	1.93%

== Education ==
The West Deptford Public Schools serve students in pre-kindergarten through twelfth grade. As of the 2021–22 school year, the district, comprised of five schools, had an enrollment of 2,947 students and 238.5 classroom teachers (on an FTE basis), for a student–teacher ratio of 12.4:1. Schools in the district (with 2021–22 enrollment data from the National Center for Education Statistics) are Oakview Elementary School with 423 students in grades PreK-1, Red Bank Elementary School with 308 students in grade K and 2, Green-Fields Elementary School with 483 students in grades 3-4, West Deptford Middle School with 869 students in grades 5-8 and West Deptford High School with 821 students in grades 9-12.

Students from across the county are eligible to apply to attend Gloucester County Institute of Technology, a four-year high school in Deptford Township that provides technical and vocational education. As a public school, students do not pay tuition to attend the school.

The Roman Catholic Diocese of Camden operated St. Matthews School, which had campuses in Verga and National Park. In 2007 it was consolidated into Holy Trinity Regional School in Deptford Township. In 2017 the school moved to the former St. Patrick's Building in Woodbury due to the superior condition of that building, according to the archdiocese. It opened as Holy Angels Catholic School which still operates. Guardian Angels Regional School is a K-8 school that operates under the auspices of the Diocese of Camden and accepts students from West Deptford Township. Its PreK-3 campus is in Gibbstown while its 4-8 campus is in Paulsboro.

== Transportation ==
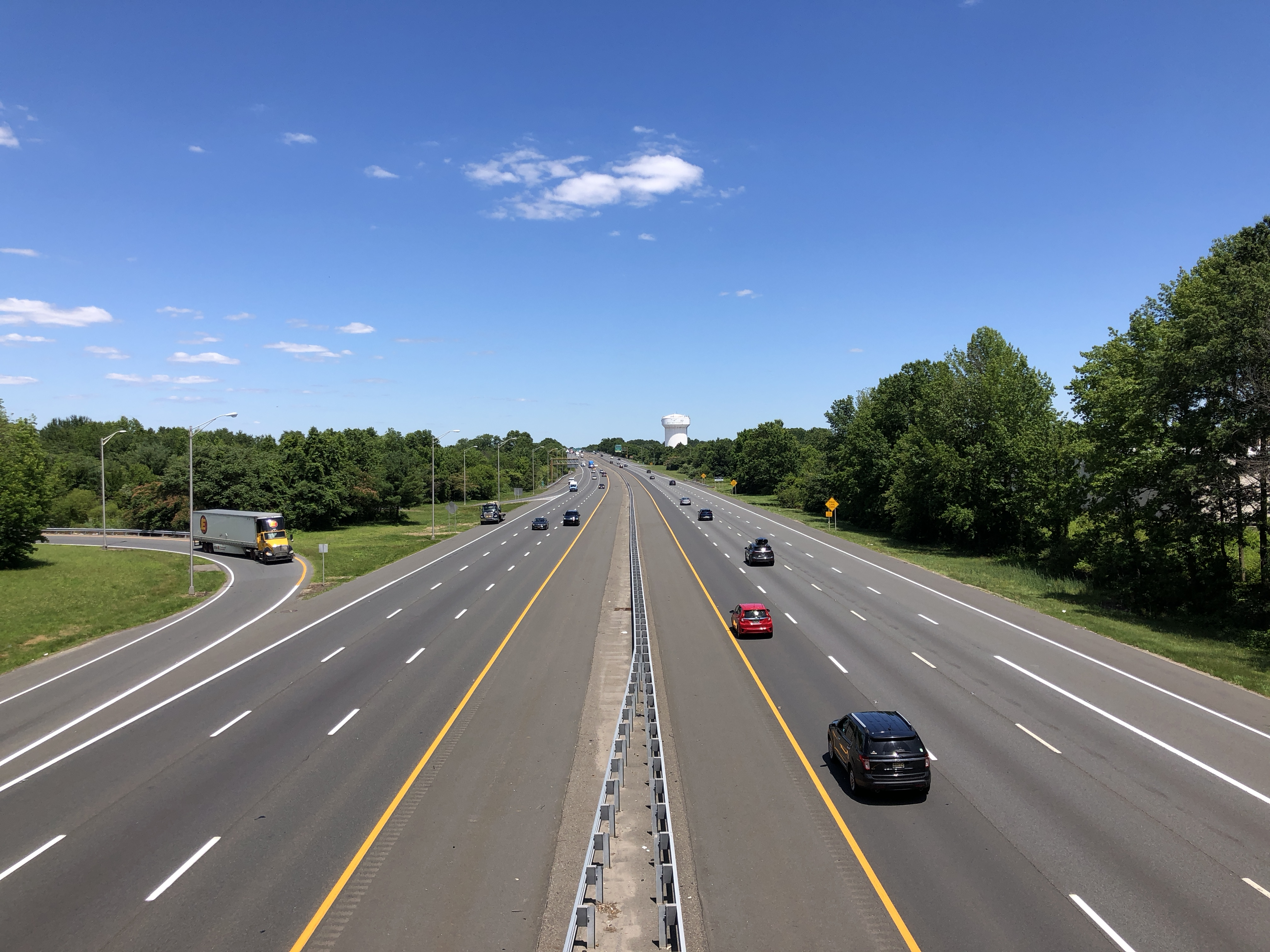
Interstate 295 northbound and U.S. Route 130 in West Deptford Township

=== Roads and highways ===
As of May 2010, the township had a total of 98.00 miles (157.72 km) of roadways, of which 64.28 miles (103.45 km) were maintained by the municipality, 20.79 miles (33.46 km) by Gloucester County and 11.07 miles (17.82 km) by the New Jersey Department of Transportation and 1.86 miles (2.99 km) by the New Jersey Turnpike Authority.

There are several major roadways in and around West Deptford Township. These include Interstate 295, which enters the township's southwest from Paulsboro and continues for 5.5 miles (8.9 km) towards the northeast to Deptford Township and includes exits 19, 20, 21, 22 and 23. U.S. Route 130 follows a concurrency with Interstate 295, splitting off near interchange 23 towards the township's northeast as Crown Point Road and continuing into Westville. Route 44 (Crown Point Road) enters from Paulsboro, closely paralleling Interstate 295 for 4.0 miles (6.4 km) to its northern terminus in the township. Route 45 (Mantua Avenue) enters from Mantua Township in the extreme southeast corner of the township and runs along the eastern border with Deptford Township and then Woodbury Heights, enters Woodbury and then reenters West Deptford Township as its border with Deptford Township before continuing to the north towards its terminus in Westville.

County Route 551, also known as Kings Highway, enters on the south from East Greenwich Township and continues for 2.4 miles (3.9 km) heading northeast into Woodbury. The New Jersey Turnpike passes through the township's southeastern corner, heading northeast from East Greenwich Township to Woodbury Heights, but the nearest exits are Interchanges 3 and 2.

=== Public transportation ===
NJ Transit bus service between the township and Philadelphia is available on the 401 (Salem to Philadelphia), 402 (Pennsville Township to Philadelphia), 410 (Bridgeton to Philadelphia) and 412 (Glassboro to Philadelphia) routes, with local service offered on the 455 route between Cherry Hill Township and Paulsboro.

== Port of Paulsboro ==
The Port of Paulsboro is located on the Delaware River and Mantua Creek in Paulsboro and West Deptford. Traditionally one of the nation's busiest for marine transfer operations of petroleum products, the port is being redeveloped as an adaptable omniport able to handle a diversity of bulk, break bulk cargo and shipping containers. Studies completed in 2012. concluded that the port is well suited to become a center for the manufacture, assembly, and transport of wind turbines and platforms the development of Atlantic Wind Connection

== Community ==
West Deptford is host of the annual Senior Little League Baseball Eastern Regional Tournament. The winner of this tournament advances to the Senior League World Series held annually in Bangor, Maine since 2002.

== Notable people ==
People who were born in, residents of, or otherwise closely associated with West Deptford Township include:

- Dan Baker (born 1946), sports announcer for the Philadelphia Eagles and Philadelphia Phillies
- Dennis Coralluzzo (1953–2001), professional wrestling promoter for NWA New Jersey and former president and board member of the National Wrestling Alliance
- Martin A. Herman (born 1939), politician who represented the 3rd Legislative District in the New Jersey General Assembly from 1974 to 1986, and was a judge in New Jersey Superior Court in Gloucester County
- Jeremy Maclin (born 1988), former professional football player, Baltimore Ravens, Kansas City Chiefs, and Philadelphia Eagles
- Anthony Scirrotto (born 1986), former professional football player who played in the NFL for the Carolina Panthers, New York Giants, and Philadelphia Eagles
- Stephen Sweeney (born 1959), former New Jersey Senate president
- Elaine Van Blunk (born 1964), long-distance runner who finished third at the 1994 Chicago Marathon
- Dajuan Wagner, (born 1983), former National Basketball Association player

Preceded by Westville	Bordering communities of Philadelphia; With: National Park	Succeeded by Tinicum Township, Pennsylvania; Delaware County
