= Woodbury Friends' Meetinghouse =

Historic meetinghouse in New Jersey, United States

- U.S. National Register of Historic Places
- New Jersey Register of Historic Places
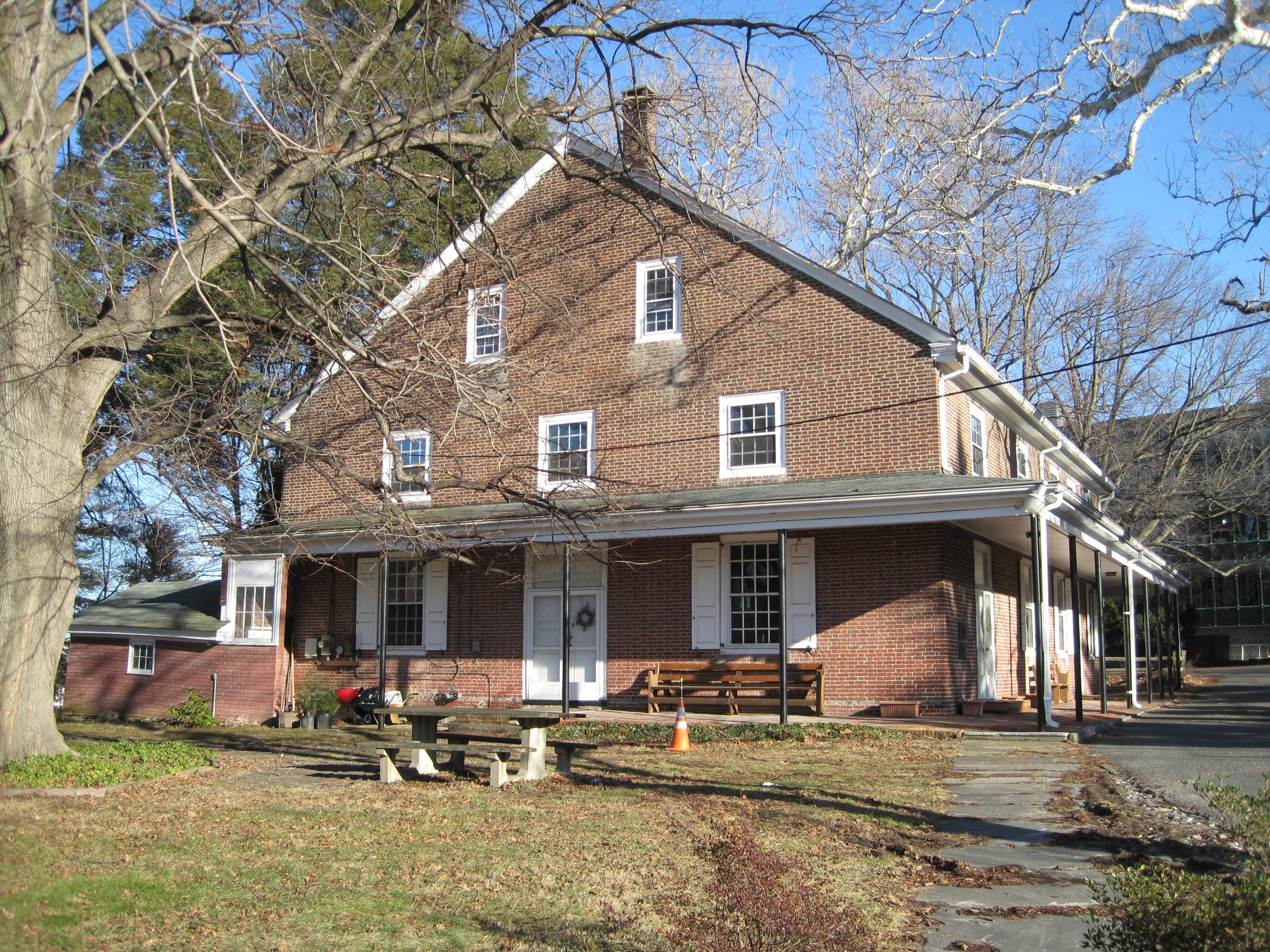

- Location within Gloucester County, New Jersey Location within New Jersey Location within the United States
- Location: 120 North Broad Street, Woodbury, New Jersey
- Coordinates: 39°50′26″N 75°9′4″W
- Area: 2.5 acres (1.0 ha)
- Built: 1715
- NRHP reference No.: 73001100
- NJRHP No.: 1439

Significant dates
- Added to NRHP: February 6, 1973
- Designated NJRHP: May 1, 1972

The Woodbury Friends' Meetinghouse is located at 120 North Broad Street in the city of Woodbury in Gloucester County, New Jersey, United States. The Friends meeting house was built in 1715 and was documented by the Historic American Buildings Survey (HABS) in 1936. It was added to the National Register of Historic Places on February 6, 1973, for its significance in architecture and religion.

== History and description ==
The western side of the meetinghouse was built in 1715 and the eastern side in 1785. The two-story building is constructed using red brick, with Flemish bond and glazed brick on the western side. It was used by the Quakers in the Woodbury area, including the Whitall family. During the American Revolutionary War, it was used as a barracks by the British Army and as a hospital after the Battle of Red Bank in 1777.

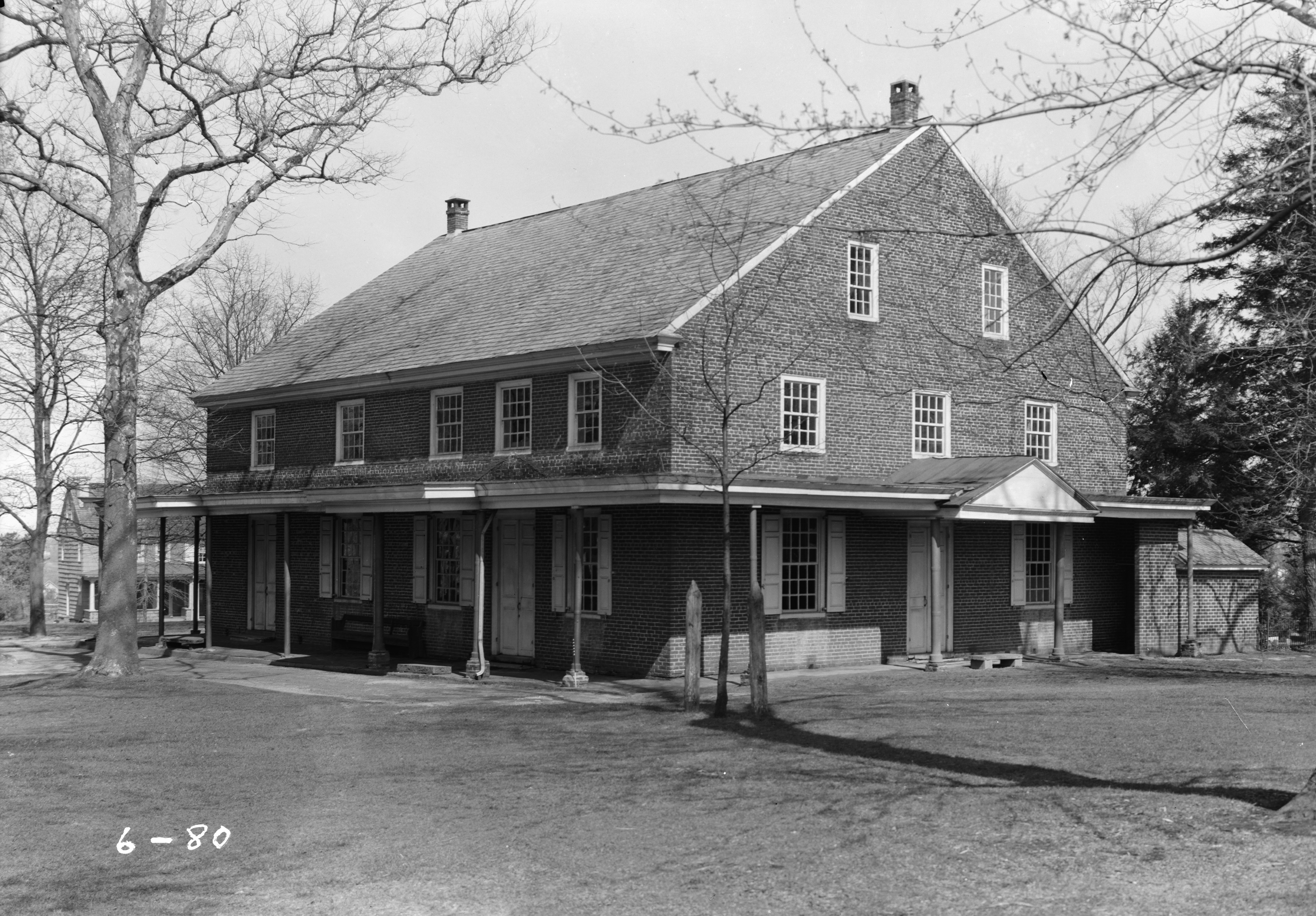
HABS photo from 1936

== See also ==
- National Register of Historic Places listings in Gloucester County, New Jersey
- List of the oldest buildings in New Jersey
- James Whitall Jr. House
- James and Ann Whitall House
