= Whitall =

Whitall is a given name and a surname. Notable people with the name include:

- Ann Cooper Whitall (1716–1797), prominent Quaker woman in the colonial U.S.
- James Whitall (writer) (1888–1954), American author and translator
- John M. Whitall (1800–1877), prominent US sea captain, businessman and philanthropist in New Jersey and Pennsylvania
- Whitall Perry (1920–2005), American author
- Hannah Whitall Smith (1832–1911), lay speaker and author in the Holiness movement in the United States

== See also ==
- Whitall Tatum Company or Whitall Tatum (1806–1938), one of the first glass factories in the United States
- James and Ann Whitall House, located along the Delaware River in National Park, Gloucester County, New Jersey
- James Whitall Jr. House, located at 100 Grove Avenue in the borough of National Park, Gloucester County, New Jersey
- Whitehall (disambiguation)
