= National Register of Historic Places listings in Gloucester County, New Jersey =

Location of Gloucester County in New Jersey

List of the National Register of Historic Places listings in Gloucester County, New Jersey

Contents: Counties and communities in New Jersey
Atlantic – Bergen (Closter, Franklin Lakes, Ridgewood, Saddle River, Wyckoff) – Burlington – Camden – Cape May – Cumberland – Essex – Gloucester – Hudson – Hunterdon – Mercer – Middlesex – Monmouth – Morris – Ocean – Passaic – Salem – Somerset – Sussex – Union – Warren

This is intended to be a complete list of properties and districts listed on the National Register of Historic Places in Gloucester County, New Jersey. Latitude and longitude coordinates of the sites listed on this page may be displayed in an online map.

This National Park Service list is complete through NPS recent listings posted April 24, 2026.

| | Name on the Register | Image | Date listed | Location | City or town | Description |
|---|---|---|---|---|---|---|
| 1 | Barnsboro Hotel | Barnsboro Hotel | January 25, 1973 (#73001095) | Jct. of Pitman and Sewell Rds. 39°45′42″N 75°09′37″W | Mantua Township | |
| 2 | Butler Farm | Butler Farm | December 1, 1978 (#78001763) | E of Swedesboro; 39°44′09″N 75°16′17″W | Swedesboro | |
| 3 | Carpenter Street School | Carpenter Street School | August 21, 1997 (#97000934) | 53–55 Carpenter St. 39°49′54″N 75°09′16″W | Woodbury | |
| 4 | Jesse Chew House | Jesse Chew House | October 18, 1972 (#72000797) | 611 Mantua Blvd. 39°46′25″N 75°08′58″W | Sewell | |
| 5 | Benjamin Clark House | Benjamin Clark House | January 25, 1973 (#73001099) | Glassboro Road; 39°47′07″N 75°08′15″W | Wenonah | |
| 6 | Downer Methodist Episcopal Church | Downer Methodist Episcopal Church | October 14, 2010 (#10000835) | 2226 Fries Mill Rd. 39°41′34″N 75°03′08″W | Monroe Township | |
| 7 | Free Library and Reading Room–Williamstown Memorial Library | Free Library and Reading Room–Williamstown Memorial Library | October 1, 1987 (#87001761) | 405 S. Main St. 39°40′57″N 74°59′27″W | Williamstown | |
| 8 | G. G. Green's Block | G. G. Green's Block | July 25, 2001 (#01000769) | 108 S. Broad St. 39°50′11″N 75°09′16″W | Woodbury | |
| 9 | Hall Street School | Hall Street School | September 27, 2006 (#06000879) | 30 Hall St. 39°41′03″N 74°59′31″W | Monroe Township | |
| 10 | Hunter–Lawrence–Jessup House | Hunter–Lawrence–Jessup House | October 18, 1972 (#72000798) | 58 N. Broad St. 39°50′22″N 75°09′07″W | Woodbury | |
| 11 | Ladd's Castle | Ladd's Castle | October 31, 1972 (#72000794) | 1337 Lafayette Avenue, Colonial Manor; 39°51′24″N 75°08′36″W | West Deptford Township | oldest brick house in Gloucester County |
| 12 | Memorial Presbyterian Church | Memorial Presbyterian Church | August 7, 2013 (#13000585) | 202 E. Mantua Avenue; 39°47′28″N 75°08′48″W | Wenonah | |
| 13 | Moravian Church | Moravian Church | April 3, 1973 (#73001097) | Swedesboro–Sharptown Rd. 39°42′05″N 75°19′58″W | Woolwich Township | |
| 14 | George Jr. and Sarah Morgan House | George Jr. and Sarah Morgan House | April 8, 2019 (#100003593) | 208 Egg Harbor Road; 39°46′38″N 75°05′39″W | Washington Township | Olde Stone House Historic Village |
| 15 | Mount Pleasant School | Mount Pleasant School | July 14, 2023 (#100009116) | 836 Lambs Road, Richwood; 39°43′17″N 75°09′40″W | Harrison Township | Known as the Richwood Academy |
| 16 | Mount Zion African Methodist Episcopal Church and Mount Zion Cemetery | Mount Zion African Methodist Episcopal Church and Mount Zion Cemetery | July 25, 2001 (#01000768) | 172 Garwin Rd. 39°45′54″N 75°17′50″W | Woolwich Township | |
| 17 | Mullica Hill Historic District | Mullica Hill Historic District | April 25, 1991 (#91000483) | Roughly, Main St. from Mullica Hill–Bridgeport Rd. to jct. of Commissioner's Rd. and Bridgeton Pike, Mullica Hill; 39°44′10″N 75°13′31″W | Harrison Township | |
| 18 | C. A. Nothnagle Log House | C. A. Nothnagle Log House | April 23, 1976 (#76001153) | Swedesboro–Paulsboro Rd. 39°49′05″N 75°15′59″W | Gibbstown | |
| 19 | Bodo Otto House | Bodo Otto House | December 12, 1976 (#76001154) | SR 551 and Quaker Rd. 39°47′18″N 75°14′25″W | Mickleton | |
| 20 | Pitman Grove | Pitman Grove | August 19, 1977 (#77000870) | Bounded by Holly, East, Laurel, and West Aves. (both sides); 39°43′50″N 75°07′58″W | Pitman | |
| 21 | Red Bank Battlefield | Red Bank Battlefield | October 31, 1972 (#72000796) | East bank of Delaware River and west end of Hessian Avenue; 39°52′13″N 75°11′25″W | National Park | Battle of Red Bank battlefield |
| 22 | Richardson Avenue School | Richardson Avenue School | June 18, 1998 (#98000703) | Richardson Ave. 39°44′51″N 75°18′49″W | Swedesboro | |
| 23 | Richwood Methodist Church | Richwood Methodist Church | January 19, 1979 (#79001490) | Elmer Road, Richwood; 39°43′18″N 75°10′01″W | Harrison Township | |
| 25 | John C. Rulon House | John C. Rulon House | November 22, 2000 (#00001404) | 1428 Kings Highway; 39°44′52″N 75°18′36″W | Swedesboro | |
| 26 | Salisbury Farm | Salisbury Farm | March 7, 1979 (#79001489) | Address Restricted | Bridgeport | |
| 27 | St. Peter's Episcopal Church | St. Peter's Episcopal Church | August 10, 1977 (#77000869) | King's Hwy. 39°47′58″N 75°13′28″W | Clarksboro | |
| 28 | St. Thomas Episcopal Church | St. Thomas Episcopal Church | March 3, 1975 (#75001137) | SE corner Main and Focer Sts. 39°42′28″N 75°06′37″W | Glassboro | |
| 29 | Gov. Charles C. Stratton House | Gov. Charles C. Stratton House | January 29, 1973 (#73001101) | 538 Kings Highway; 39°45′07″N 75°18′10″W | Woolwich Township | Also known as Stratton Mansion |
| 30 | Thompson House | Thompson House | July 13, 1988 (#88000996) | 103 Penn St. 39°50′00″N 75°09′34″W | Woodbury | Burned down on January 14, 2012 |
| 31 | Tinicum Island Rear Range Light Station | Tinicum Island Rear Range Light Station | September 15, 2005 (#05001053) | 250 feet south of intersection of Beacon Avenue and Second Street, Billingsport; 39°50′51″N 75°14′23″W | Paulsboro | |
| 32 | Trinity Church | Trinity Church | January 29, 1973 (#73001098) | NW corner of Church St. and King's Hwy. 39°45′00″N 75°18′26″W | Swedesboro | |
| 33 | Upper Greenwich Friends Meetinghouse | Upper Greenwich Friends Meetinghouse | February 28, 1997 (#97000062) | 413 Kings Highway, Mickleton; 39°47′27″N 75°14′16″W | East Greenwich Township | |
| 34 | West Jersey Rail Road Glassboro Depot | West Jersey Rail Road Glassboro Depot | April 14, 2020 (#100005179) | 354 Oakwood Ave. 39°42′17″N 75°07′16″W | Glassboro | |
| 35 | James Whitall Jr. House | James Whitall Jr. House | February 6, 1973 (#73001096) | 100 Grove Avenue; 39°51′52″N 75°10′49″W | National Park | |
| 36 | Whitney Mansion | Whitney Mansion | December 5, 1972 (#72000795) | Whitney Avenue; 39°42′22″N 75°07′06″W | Glassboro | known as Hollybush Mansion |
| 37 | Woodbury Friends' Meetinghouse | Woodbury Friends' Meetinghouse | February 6, 1973 (#73001100) | 120 North Broad Street; 39°50′26″N 75°09′04″W | Woodbury | |

== See also ==
- National Register of Historic Places listings in New Jersey
- List of National Historic Landmarks in New Jersey
