= Richwoods =

Richwoods may refer to:

Places

- Richwoods, Illinois, an unincorporated community
- Richwoods, Missouri, an unincorporated community
- Richwoods Township (disambiguation), several places

Other

- Richwoods High School (in Peoria, Illinois)

See also

- Richwood (disambiguation)
