= Carpenter Street =

Carpenter Street may refer to:

== Places ==
- Carpenter Street School, Woodbury, Gloucester County, New Jersey
- Carpenter Street, Evansville, Indiana, site of Willard Carpenter House
- Carpenter Street, Philadelphia, site of Sparks Shot Tower
- Carpenter Street, Rehoboth, site of Carpenter House (Rehoboth, Massachusetts)
- Carpenter Street, Singapore, site of SAFRA National Service Association
- Carpenter Street, Chicago, named after Philo Carpenter

== Film and TV ==
- Carpenter Street (Star Trek: Enterprise), referring to Carpenter Street, Detroit
