= Richwood =

Richwood may refer to:

== Places ==
=== United States ===
- Richwood, Georgia
- Richwood Township, Jersey County, Illinois
- Richwood, Kentucky
- Richwood, Louisiana
- Richwood Township, Minnesota
- Richwood, New Jersey
- Richwood, Ohio
- Richwood, Texas
- Richwood, West Virginia
- Richwood, Wisconsin, a town
- Richwood, Dodge County, Wisconsin, an unincorporated community

=== Elsewhere ===
- Richwood, Cape Town, South Africa

== See also ==
- Richwoods (disambiguation)
