= John C. Rulon House =

Historic house in New Jersey, United States

- U.S. National Register of Historic Places
- New Jersey Register of Historic Places
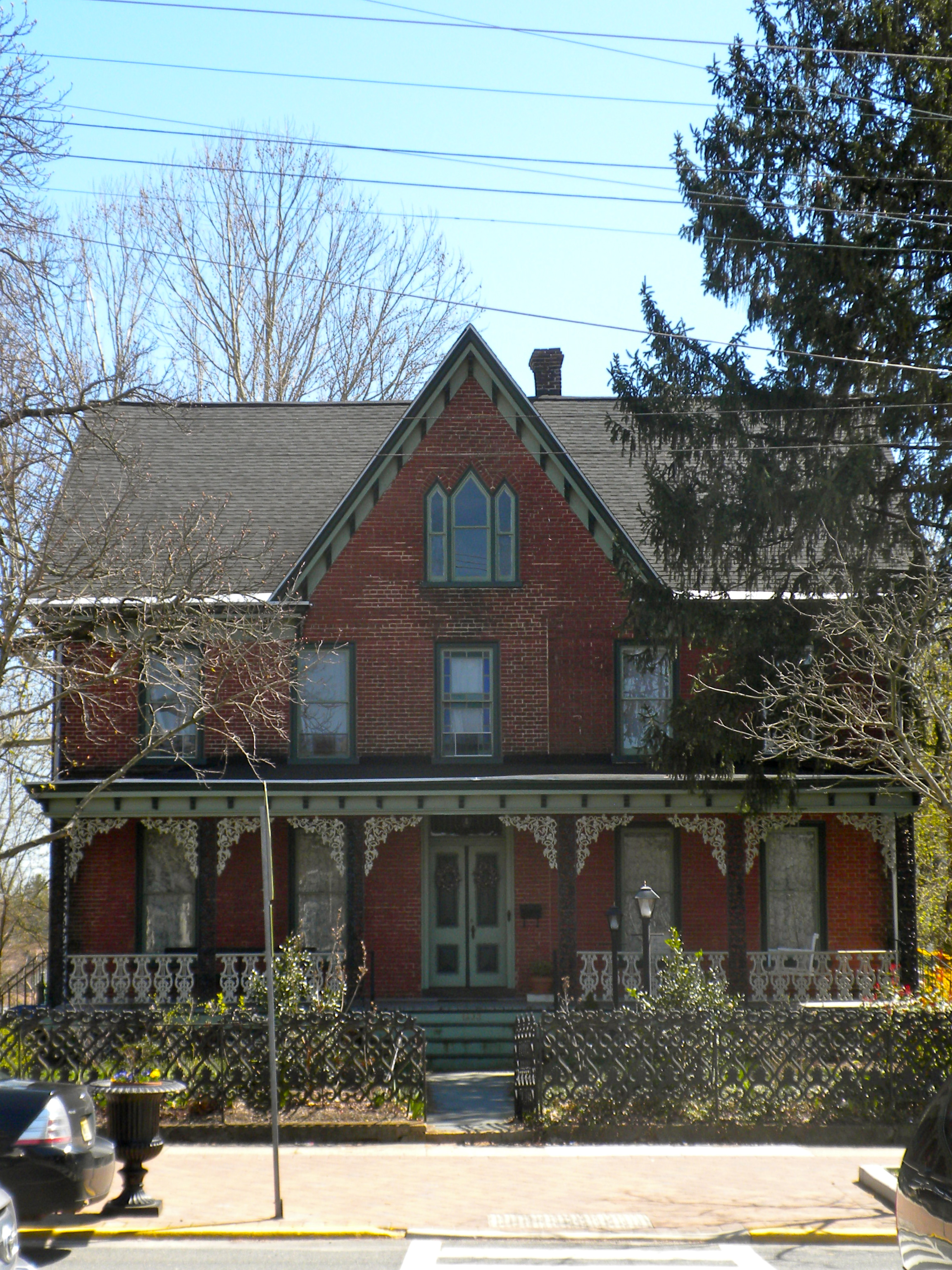

- Location within Gloucester County, New Jersey Location within New Jersey Location within the United States
- Location: 1428 Kings Highway, Swedesboro, New Jersey
- Coordinates: 39°44′50″N 75°18′37″W
- Area: 0.5 acres (0.20 ha)
- Built: 1881
- Architectural style: Gothic Revival
- NRHP reference No.: 00001404
- NJRHP No.: 3703

Significant dates
- Added to NRHP: November 22, 2000
- Designated NJRHP: December 12, 2000

John C. Rulon House is located in Swedesboro, Gloucester County, New Jersey, United States. The building was built in 1881 and was added to the National Register of Historic Places on November 22, 2000.

== See also ==
- National Register of Historic Places listings in Gloucester County, New Jersey
