= Thompson House (Woodbury, New Jersey) =

Historic house in New Jersey, United States

- U.S. National Register of Historic Places
- New Jersey Register of Historic Places
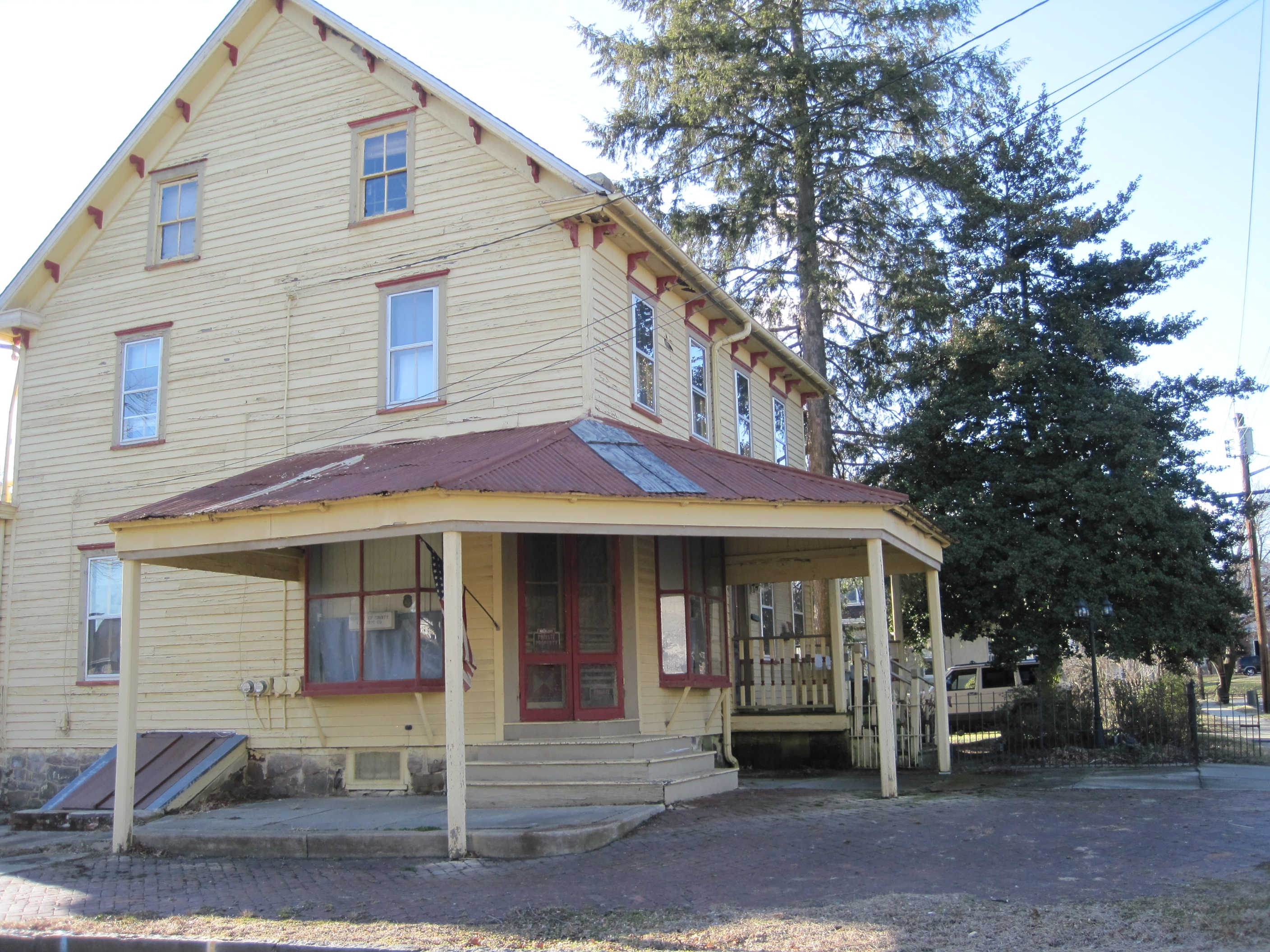

- Location within Gloucester County, New Jersey Location within New Jersey Location within the United States
- Location: 103 Penn Street, Woodbury, New Jersey
- Coordinates: 39°50′0″N 75°9′35″W
- Area: less than one acre
- Built: before 1885
- Architectural style: Late Victorian
- MPS: Woodbury MRA
- NRHP reference No.: 88000996
- NJRHP No.: 1436

Significant dates
- Added to NRHP: July 13, 1988
- Designated NJRHP: February 19, 1988

Thompson House was located on the corner of Glover and Penn Streets in Woodbury, Gloucester County, New Jersey, United States. The house was bought by John W. Thompson, glassblower, in 1885, and used as a specialty grocery store from that time until 1956. It was added to the National Register of Historic Places on July 13, 1988. It burned down on January 14, 2012.

== See also ==
- National Register of Historic Places listings in Gloucester County, New Jersey
