= Memorial Presbyterian Church (Wenonah, New Jersey) =

- U.S. National Register of Historic Places
- New Jersey Register of Historic Places
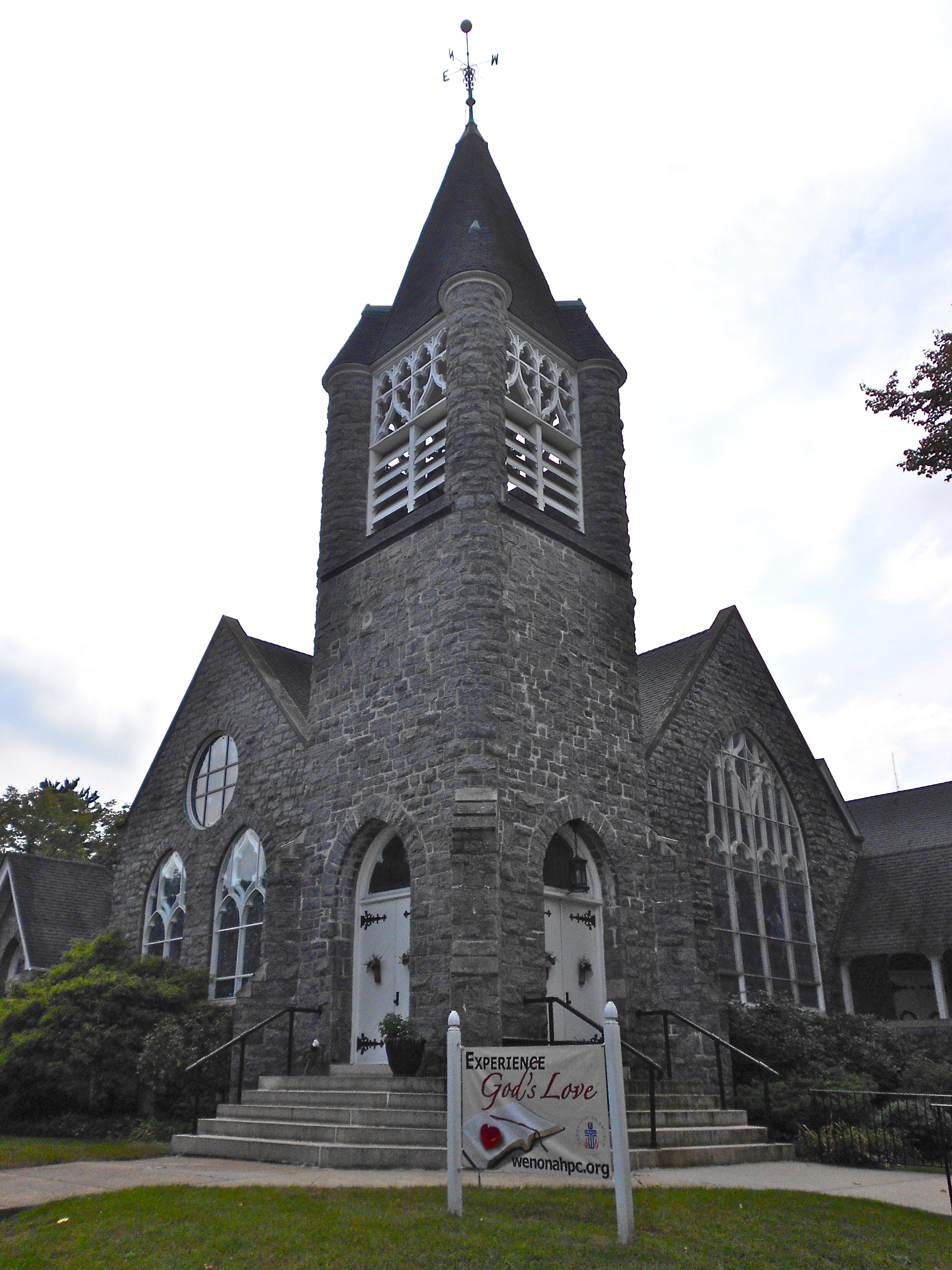

- Location within Gloucester County, New Jersey Location within New Jersey Location within the United States
- Location: 202 E. Mantua Avenue; Wenonah, New Jersey
- Coordinates: 39°44′28″N 75°8′48″W
- Built: 1904
- Architect: Isaac Newton Pursell
- Architectural style: Late Gothic Revival
- NRHP reference No.: 13000585
- NJRHP No.: 4923

Significant dates
- Added to NRHP: August 7, 2013
- Designated NJRHP: June 3, 2013

The Memorial Presbyterian Church is located at 202 E. Mantua Avenue in the borough of Wenonah in Gloucester County, New Jersey. The church was designed by architect Isaac Newton Pursell in Late Gothic Revival style and built in 1904. It was added to the National Register of Historic Places on August 7, 2013, for its significance in architecture.

== History and description ==
On January 28, 1903, the board of trustees approved a plan to build a new church, funded by Thomas W. Synnott and named the Memorial Presbyterian Church of Wenonah. Synnott was the president of the Whitney Glass Works in Glassboro. Local architect Isaac Newton Pursell designed it with Late Gothic Revival style and features a three-story bell tower. It was built using Port Deposit granite with Indiana limestone. The church was dedicated in April 1904.

== See also ==
- National Register of Historic Places listings in Gloucester County, New Jersey
