= Upper Greenwich Friends Meetinghouse =

Historic meetinghouse in New Jersey, United States

- U.S. National Register of Historic Places
- New Jersey Register of Historic Places
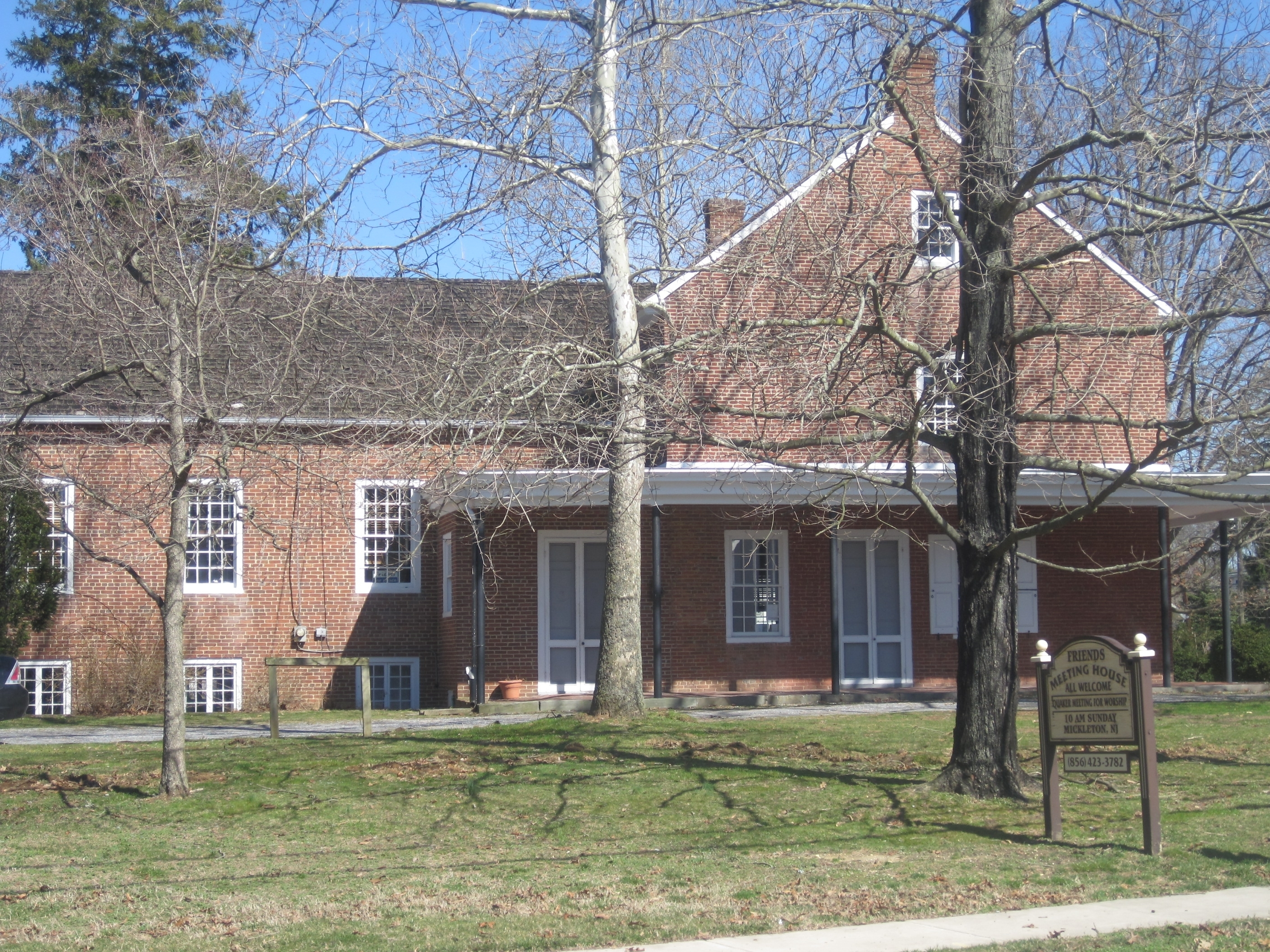

- Location within Gloucester County, New Jersey Location within New Jersey Location within the United States
- Location: 413 Kings Highway, East Greenwich Township, Mickleton, New Jersey
- Coordinates: 39°47′35″N 75°14′21″W
- Area: 3.5 acres (1.4 ha)
- Built: 1799
- Architect: Vincent Kling
- Architectural style: Federal
- NRHP reference No.: 97000062
- NJRHP No.: 3162

Significant dates
- Added to NRHP: February 28, 1997
- Designated NJRHP: December 30, 1996

The Upper Greenwich Friends Meetinghouse, also known as the Mickleton Friends Meetinghouse, is located at 413 Kings Highway in the Mickleton section of the township of East Greenwich in Gloucester County, New Jersey, United States. The Friends meeting house was built in 1799 and added to the National Register of Historic Places on February 28, 1997, for its significance in architecture. The listing includes the adjacent church graveyard.

== History and description ==
The meetinghouse is a two-story building constructed using red brick and featuring Federal architecture. On August 15, 1799, Samuel Mickle sold 1.5 acres (0.61 ha) to the Quakers for one dollar. The meetinghouse was completed later that year. An annex was built in 1919. The meetinghouse was renovated in Colonial Revival style by architect Vincent Kling in 1942.

== See also ==
- National Register of Historic Places listings in Gloucester County, New Jersey
