= Hunter–Lawrence–Jessup House =

Historic house in New Jersey, United States

- Gloucester County Historical Society Museum
- U.S. National Register of Historic Places
- New Jersey Register of Historic Places
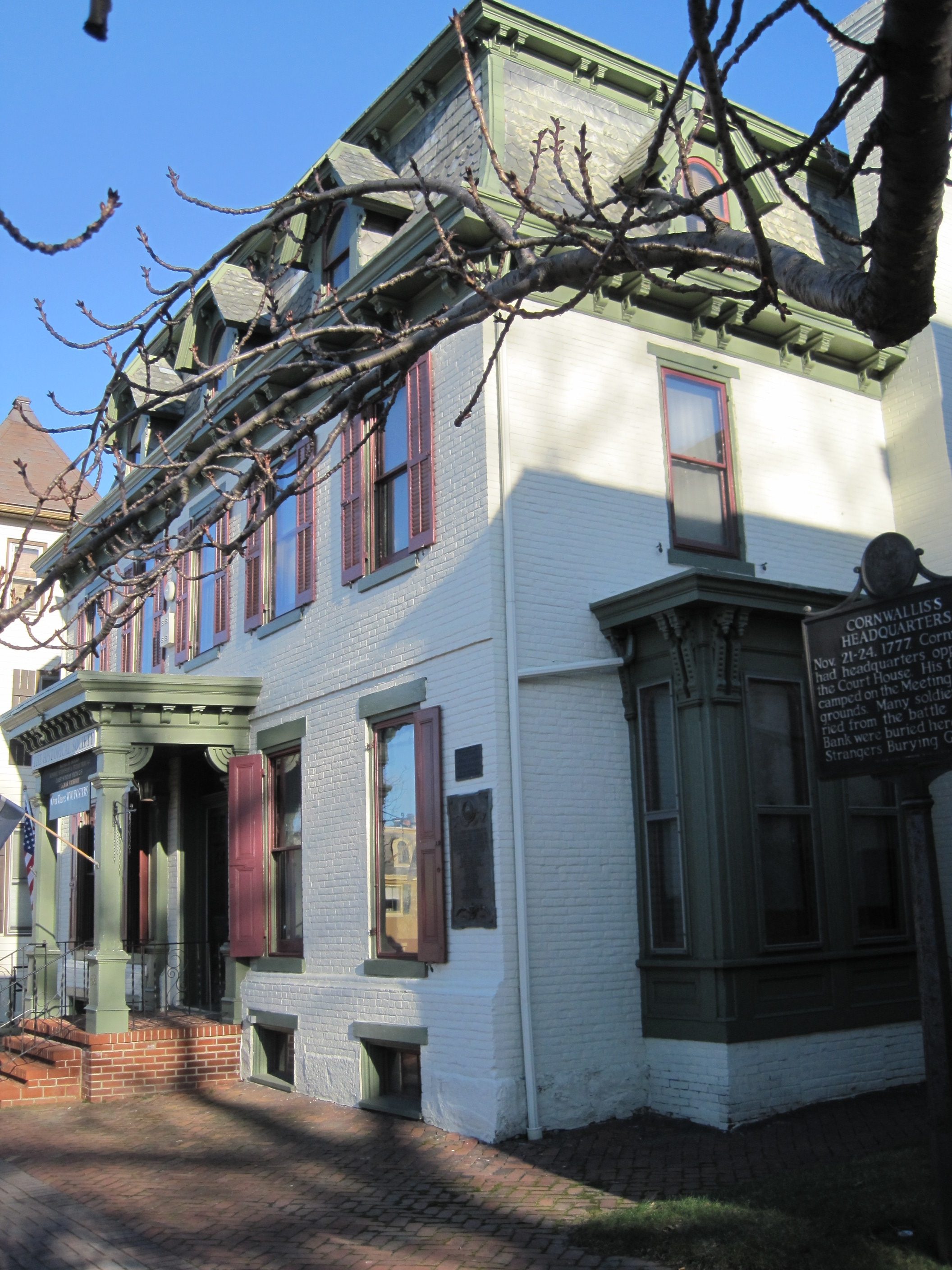
- Hunter–Lawrence–Jessup House, January 2009

- Location within Gloucester County, New Jersey Location within New Jersey Location within the United States
- Location: 58 North Broad Street, Woodbury, New Jersey, U.S.
- Coordinates: 39°50′21″N 75°9′8″W
- Built: c. 1765
- Architectural style: Second Empire
- NRHP reference No.: 72000798
- NJRHP No.: 1434

Significant dates
- Added to NRHP: October 18, 1972
- Designated NJRHP: March 15, 1972

The Hunter–Lawrence–Jessup House is a historic Second Empire style house located at 58 North Broad Street in the city of Woodbury in Gloucester County, New Jersey, United States. The house was built c. 1765 and was added to the National Register of Historic Places on October 18, 1972, for its significance in education, military history, and politics. The house is now known as the Gloucester County Historical Society Museum and is operated by the Gloucester County Historical Society as a museum of local history.

== History and description ==
The house is a two and one-half story brick building constructed c. 1765 by Judge John Sparks. In 1792, it was bought by Reverend Andrew Hunter and later in 1798, by John Lawrence. His brother, James Lawrence, also lived here. He is known for his last words: "Don't give up the ship!", as commander of the USS Chesapeake during the War of 1812. After several other owners, John S. Jessup became the owner in 1871. He renovated the house in 1888 in the Second Empire style featuring a mansard roof. After his death in 1924, it was purchased by the Gloucester County Historical Society.

== See also ==
- National Register of Historic Places listings in Gloucester County, New Jersey
- List of museums in New Jersey
