= Richwood Methodist Church =

Historic church in New Jersey, United States

- U.S. National Register of Historic Places
- New Jersey Register of Historic Places
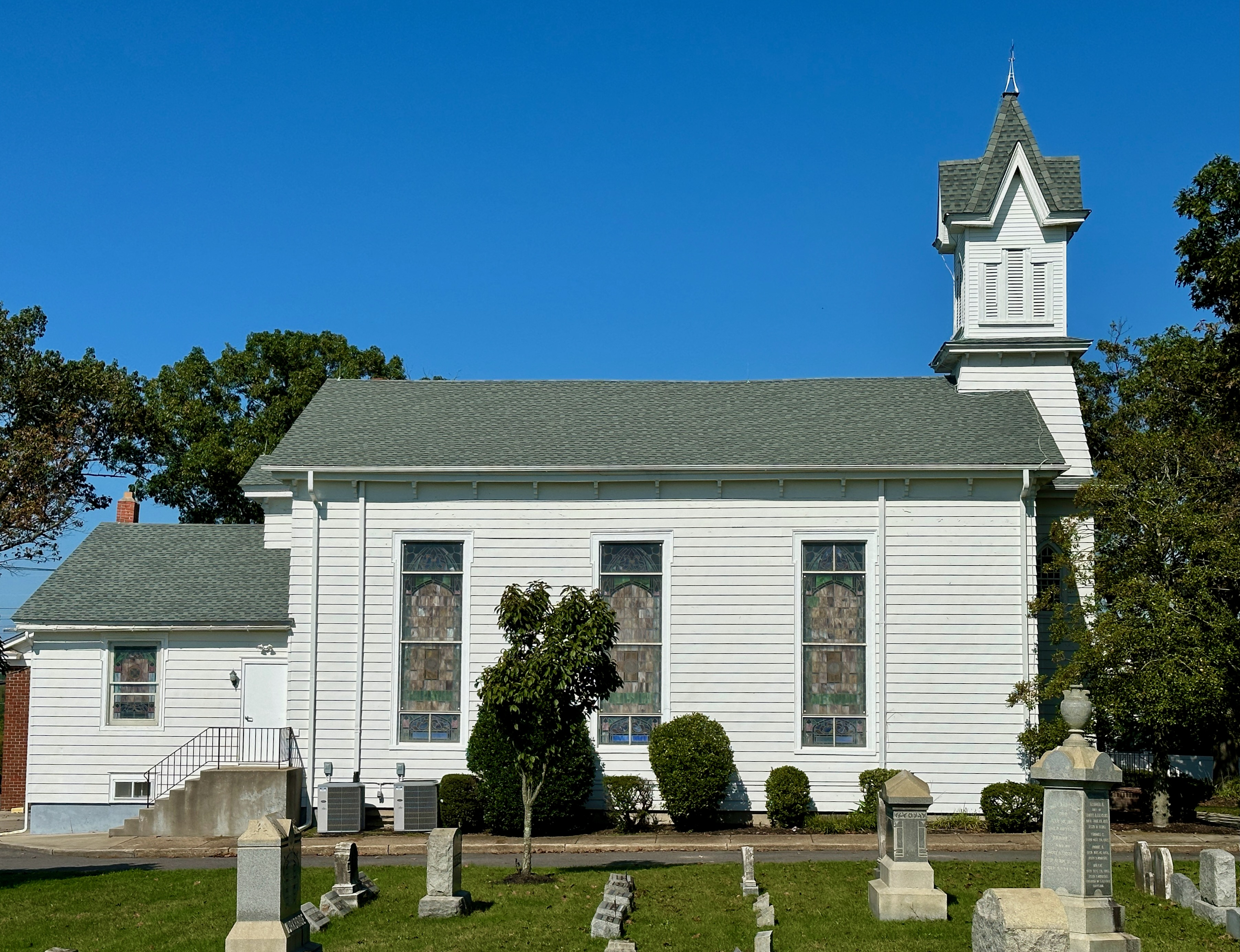
- Richwood Methodist Church and Cemetery

- Location within Gloucester County, New Jersey Location within New Jersey Location within the United States
- Location: 104 Richwood Road, Richwood, New Jersey
- Coordinates: 39°43′18″N 75°10′1″W
- Area: 5 acres (2.0 ha)
- Built: c. 1860
- Architectural style: Late Victorian
- NRHP reference No.: 79001490
- NJRHP No.: 1390
- Added to NRHP: January 19, 1979

The Richwood Methodist Church is located at 104 Richwood Road in the Richwood section of the township of Harrison in Gloucester County, New Jersey, United States. The historic church was built around 1860 and added to the National Register of Historic Places on January 19, 1979, for its significance in architecture. The listing includes the adjacent church cemetery.

== History and description ==
The church was organized on May 22, 1860. The land for the church building was purchased on August 2. It was built later in the year or early in 1861. The Late Victorian style church also has Greek and Gothic features. The church has also been known as Mount Pleasant and Five Points. Stained glass windows were installed in 1925.

== See also ==
- National Register of Historic Places listings in Gloucester County, New Jersey
