= G. G. Green's Block =

- G.G. Green's Block
- U.S. National Register of Historic Places
- New Jersey Register of Historic Places
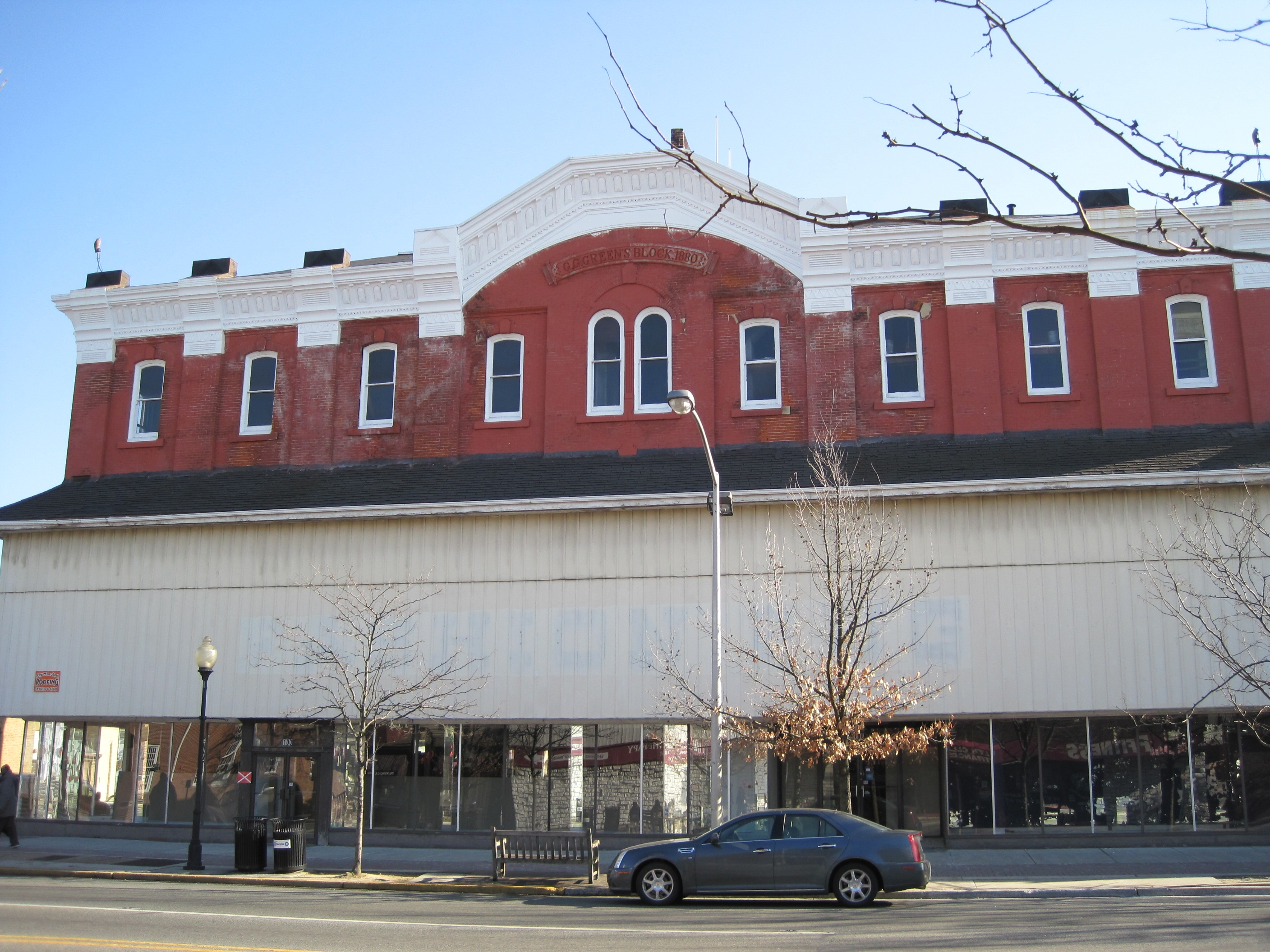

- Location within Gloucester County, New Jersey Location within New Jersey Location within the United States
- Location: 108 South Broad Street, Woodbury, New Jersey
- Coordinates: 39°50′11″N 75°9′16″W
- Area: 0.4 acres (0.16 ha)
- Built: 1880
- Architect: John C. Rogers and later Hoffman-Henon Co.
- Architectural style: Romanesque
- NRHP reference No.: 01000769
- NJRHP No.: 3793

Significant dates
- Added to NRHP: July 25, 2001
- Designated NJRHP: June 11, 2001

G.G. Green's Block is located in Woodbury, Gloucester County, New Jersey, United States. The building was built in 1880 and was added to the National Register of Historic Places on July 25, 2001.

== Earthquake damage ==
Following the 2011 Virginia earthquake the vacant building and attached structures, which were also vacant, were ruled structurally unsafe. The sidewalk in front of the building as well as the adjoining streets were fenced off by the City of Woodbury. Due to several liens placed on the building and against the owner, the decision on what to do with the building fell to the City. Estimates to demolish the building ranged as high as $950,000. Woodbury City reached out to developers to take control of the property. A deal was struck with the RPM Development Group to repair the building, turn the ground floor into retail space, and construct age restricted apartments on the upper floors.

== See also ==
- National Register of Historic Places listings in Gloucester County, New Jersey
