= Richwood Academy =

- Mount Pleasant School
- U.S. National Register of Historic Places
- New Jersey Register of Historic Places
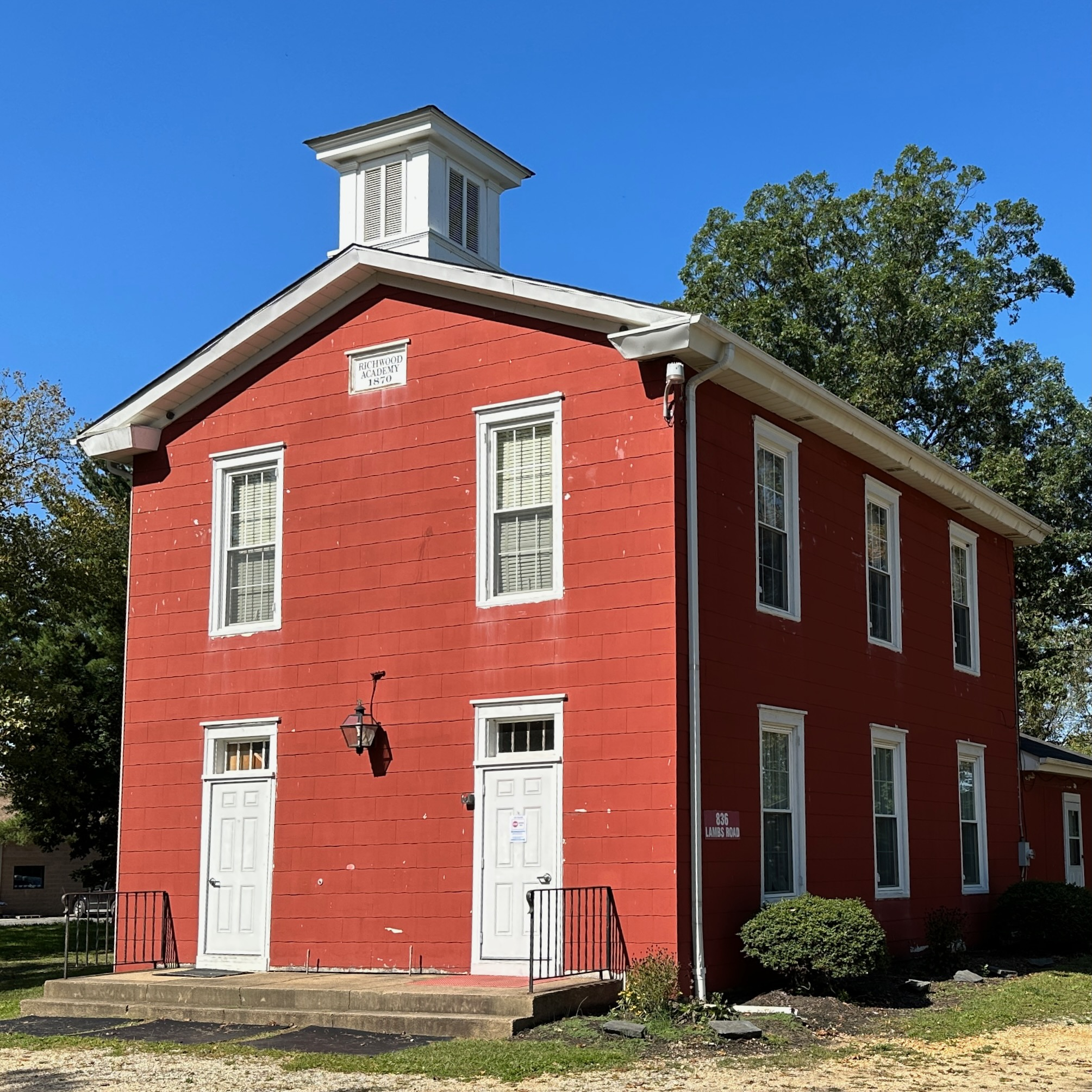
- Richwood Academy, formerly the Mount Pleasant School

- Location within Gloucester County, New Jersey Location within New Jersey Location within the United States
- Location: 836 Lambs Road, Richwood, New Jersey
- Coordinates: 39°43′18″N 75°09′41″W
- Built: 1870
- Built by: Thomas S. Sharp and James Fletcher
- NRHP reference No.: 100009116
- NJRHP No.: 3164

Significant dates
- Added to NRHP: July 14, 2023
- Designated NJRHP: March 21, 2023

The Richwood Academy, historically known as the Mount Pleasant School, is located at 836 Lambs Road in the Richwood section of the township of Harrison in Gloucester County, New Jersey, United States. Built in 1870, the historic schoolhouse was added to the National Register of Historic Places on July 14, 2023, for its significance in architecture and education. The building, also known as the Richwood Academy Cultural Center, is used by the Harrison Township Historical Society for lectures and performances.

== History and description ==
The two-story, two-room schoolhouse was built in 1870 by Thomas S. Sharp and James Fletcher. It is the second one located at this site. The first was a one-room schoolhouse built in 1855. The community has been known by various names, Mount Pleasant by 1850, Five Points in 1869, and Richwood in 1889. It was named by "Fancy Joe" Jackson after a relative, Garwood Richwood Marshall. The building was used as a schoolhouse until 1950, when the township elementary school opened. In 1951, the Richwood Academy Association was formed and they purchased the building.

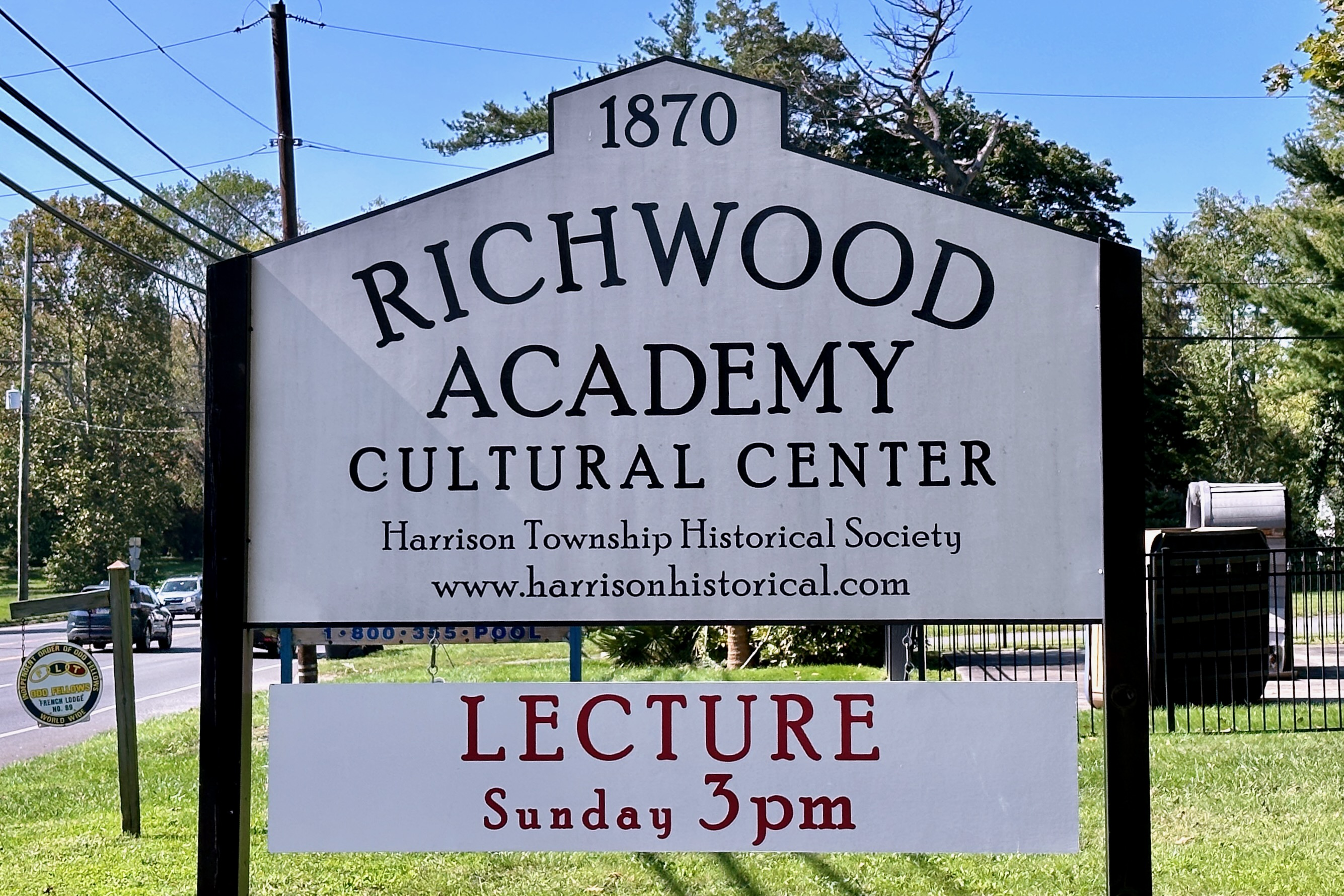
Richwood Academy Cultural Center sign

== See also ==
- National Register of Historic Places listings in Gloucester County, New Jersey
