= Richardson Avenue School =

- U.S. National Register of Historic Places
- New Jersey Register of Historic Places
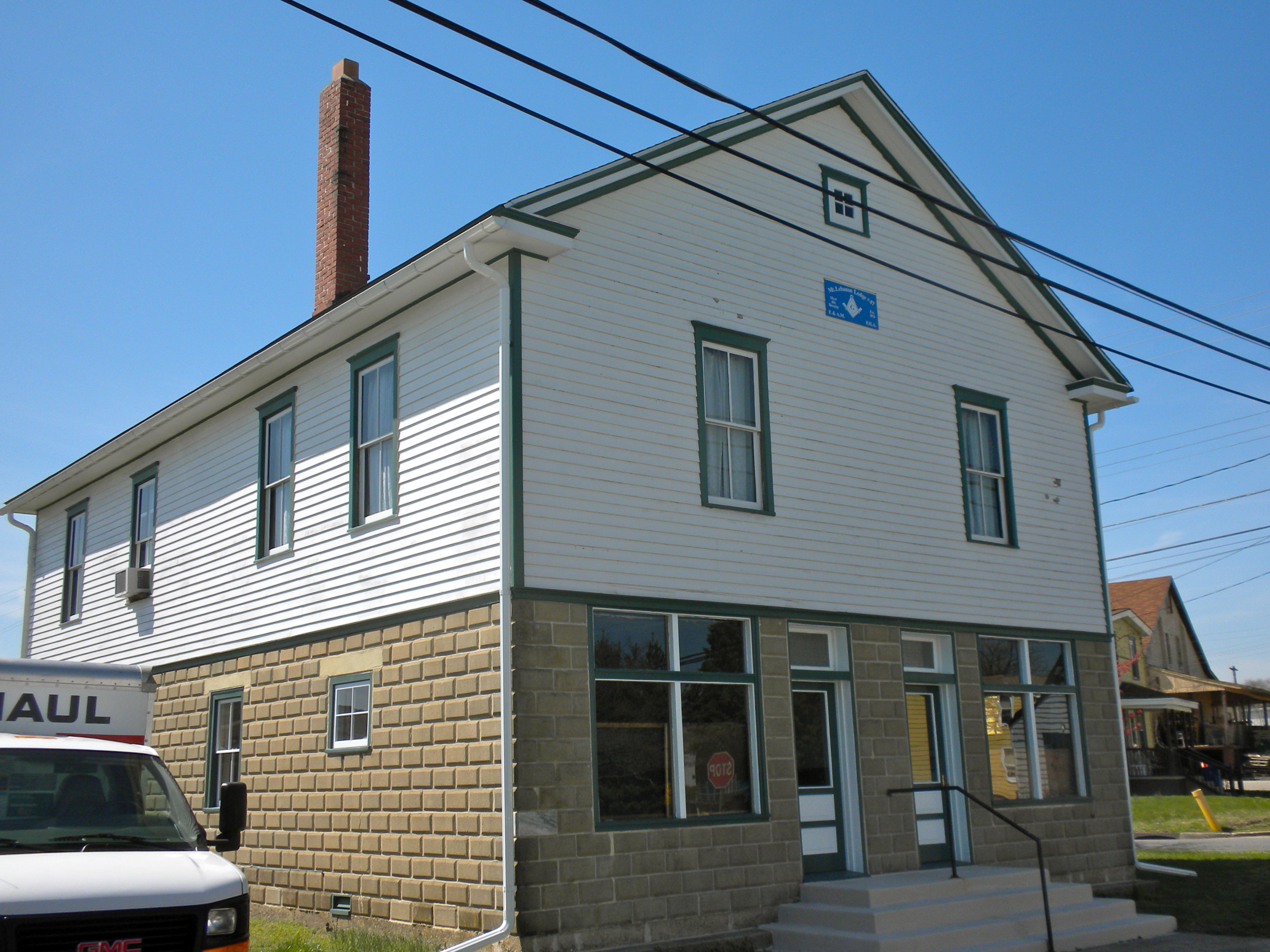

- Location within Gloucester County, New Jersey Location within New Jersey Location within the United States
- Location: Richardson Avenue, Swedesboro, New Jersey
- Coordinates: 39°44′51″N 75°18′49″W
- Area: 0.1 acres (0.040 ha)
- Built: 1931
- Architect: Davis, Charles
- Architectural style: Late 19th And 20th Century Revivals
- NRHP reference No.: 98000703
- NJRHP No.: 3221

Significant dates
- Added to NRHP: June 18, 1998
- Designated NJRHP: April 24, 1998

Richardson Avenue School is located in Swedesboro, Gloucester County, New Jersey, United States. The school was built in 1931 and was added to the National Register of Historic Places on June 18, 1998.

== See also ==
- National Register of Historic Places listings in Gloucester County, New Jersey
