= Salisbury Farm (Bridgeport, New Jersey) =

- U.S. National Register of Historic Places
- New Jersey Register of Historic Places
- Nearest city: Bridgeport, New Jersey
- Area: 5 acres (2.0 ha)
- NRHP reference No.: 79001489
- NJRHP No.: 1397

Significant dates
- Added to NRHP: March 7, 1979
- Designated NJRHP: April 12, 1976

Salisbury Farm, also known as the Salisbury Site, is a 5-acre (2.0 ha) prehistoric and historic archaeological site located in the Bridgeport section of Logan Township in Gloucester County, New Jersey, United States. Located in the vicinity of Raccoon Creek and the Delaware River, it was the site of both Native American habitation and of early colonial settlement in the mid-17th century. The site, first investigated under the auspices of the Works Progress Administration in 1937, was added to the National Register of Historic Places on March 7, 1979. In 1939, the State Archaeologist Dorothy Cross may have found two possible earthfast buildings from the 1670s to 1680s occupation of the Salisbury site.

== See also ==
- National Register of Historic Places listings in Gloucester County, New Jersey
