= James Whitall Jr. House =

Historic house in New Jersey, United States

- U.S. National Register of Historic Places
- New Jersey Register of Historic Places
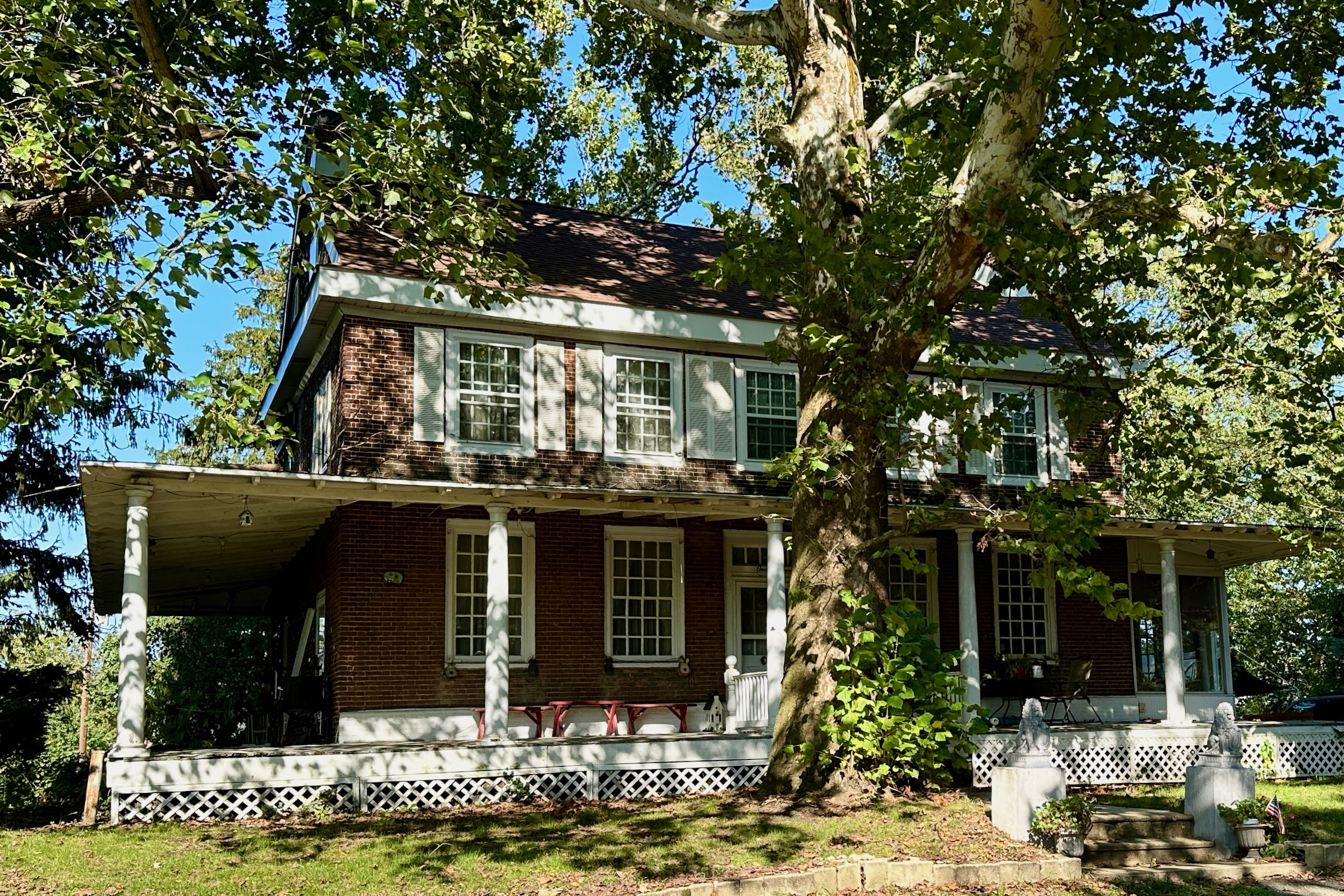
- James Whitall Jr. House in 2023

- Location within Gloucester County, New Jersey Location within New Jersey Location within the United States
- Location: 100 Grove Avenue, National Park, New Jersey
- Coordinates: 39°51′52″N 75°10′47″W
- Area: 2 acres (0.81 ha)
- Built: 1766
- Built by: James Whitall Jr.
- NRHP reference No.: 73001096
- NJRHP No.: 1409

Significant dates
- Added to NRHP: February 6, 1973
- Designated NJRHP: May 1, 1972

The James Whitall Jr. House is located at 100 Grove Avenue in the borough of National Park, Gloucester County, New Jersey. The house was built in 1766 and documented by the Historic American Buildings Survey (HABS) in 1937. It was added to the National Register of Historic Places on February 6, 1973, for its significance in architecture.

== History and description ==
The house is a two story brick building with Flemish bond and a gable roof. It was built by James Whitall Jr. in 1766, noted by glazed header bricks in the southeast gable. His father built the nearby James and Ann Whitall House located in the Red Bank Battlefield Park in 1748.

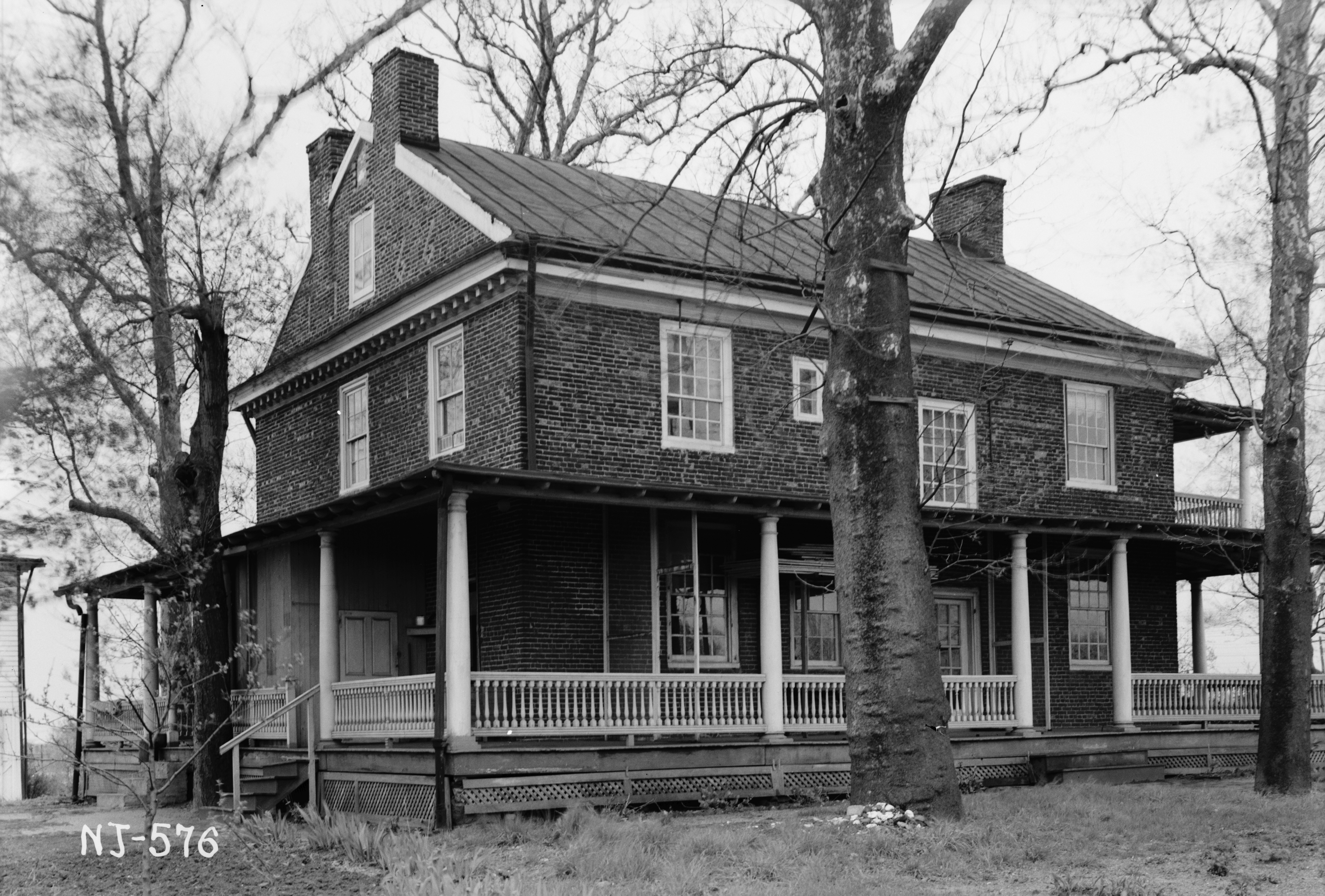
HABS photo from 1937

== See also ==
- National Register of Historic Places listings in Gloucester County, New Jersey
- List of the oldest buildings in New Jersey
