= Free Library and Reading Room–Williamstown Memorial Library =

- U.S. National Register of Historic Places
- New Jersey Register of Historic Places
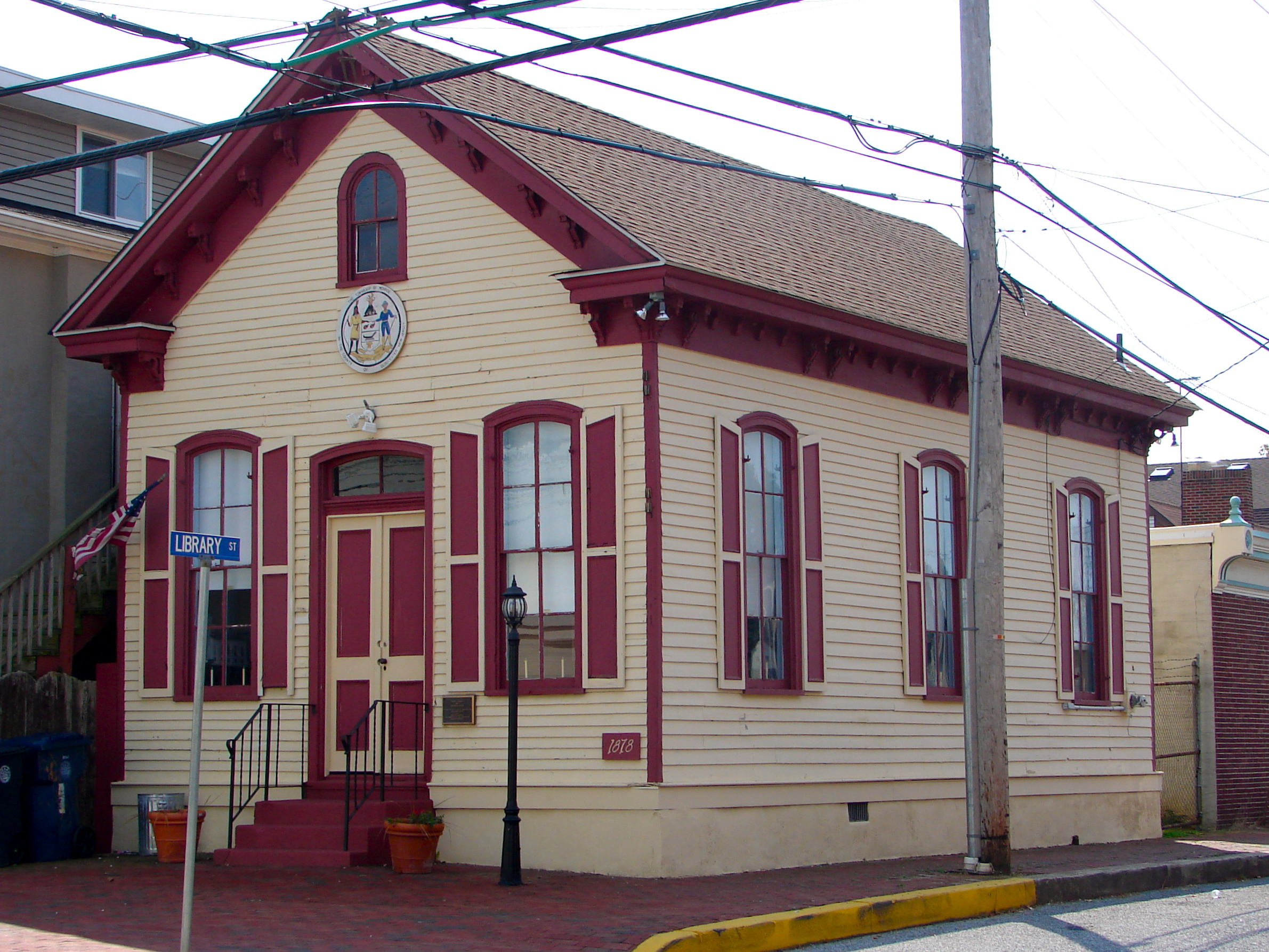

- Location within Gloucester County, New Jersey Location within New Jersey Location within the United States
- Location: 405 South Main Street, Williamstown, New Jersey
- Coordinates: 39°40′55″N 74°59′29″W
- Area: less than one acre
- Built: 1878; 148 years ago
- Architectural style: Victorian Classical
- NRHP reference No.: 87001761
- NJRHP No.: 1403

Significant dates
- Added to NRHP: October 1, 1987
- Designated NJRHP: August 13, 1987

Free Library and Reading Room–Williamstown Memorial Library is located in the Williamstown section of Monroe Township, in Gloucester County, New Jersey, United States. The library was built in 1878 and was added to the National Register of Historic Places on October 1, 1987.

== See also ==
- National Register of Historic Places listings in Gloucester County, New Jersey
