= Richwood Township =

Richwood Township may refer to:

- Richwood Township, Becker County, Minnesota
- Richwood Township, Jersey County, Illinois

== See also ==
- Richwoods Township (disambiguation)
