= Butler Farm =

Historic house in New Jersey, United States

- U.S. National Register of Historic Places
- New Jersey Register of Historic Places
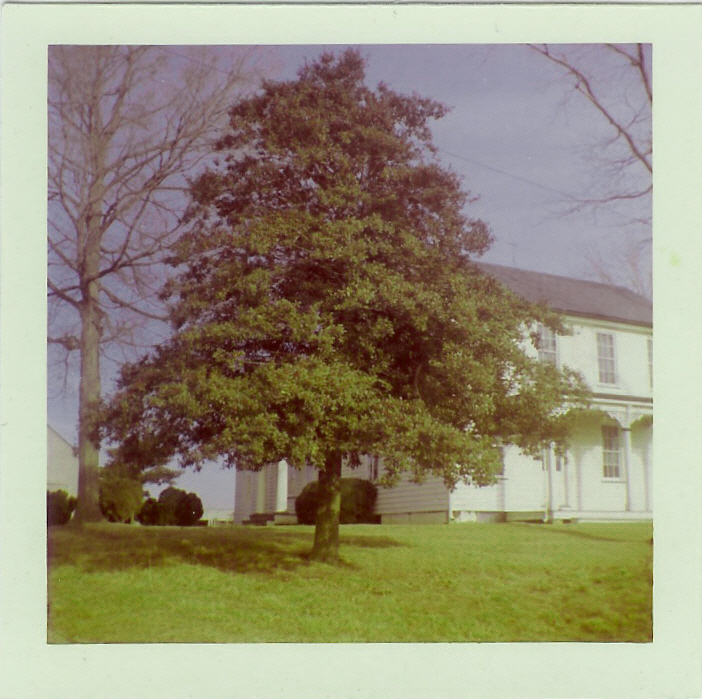
- Holly tree in front of the Butler farm on High Street, circa 1974.

- Location within Gloucester County, New Jersey Location within New Jersey Location within the United States
- Nearest city: Swedesboro, New Jersey
- Coordinates: 39°44′9″N 75°16′17″W
- Area: 5 acres (2.0 ha)
- Architectural style: Federal
- NRHP reference No.: 78001763
- NJRHP No.
- Added to NRHP: December 1, 1978

Butler Farm is located in Swedesboro, Gloucester County, New Jersey, United States. The farm was added to the National Register of Historic Places on December 1, 1978.

== See also ==
- National Register of Historic Places listings in Gloucester County, New Jersey
