= Carpenter Street School =

- U.S. National Register of Historic Places
- New Jersey Register of Historic Places
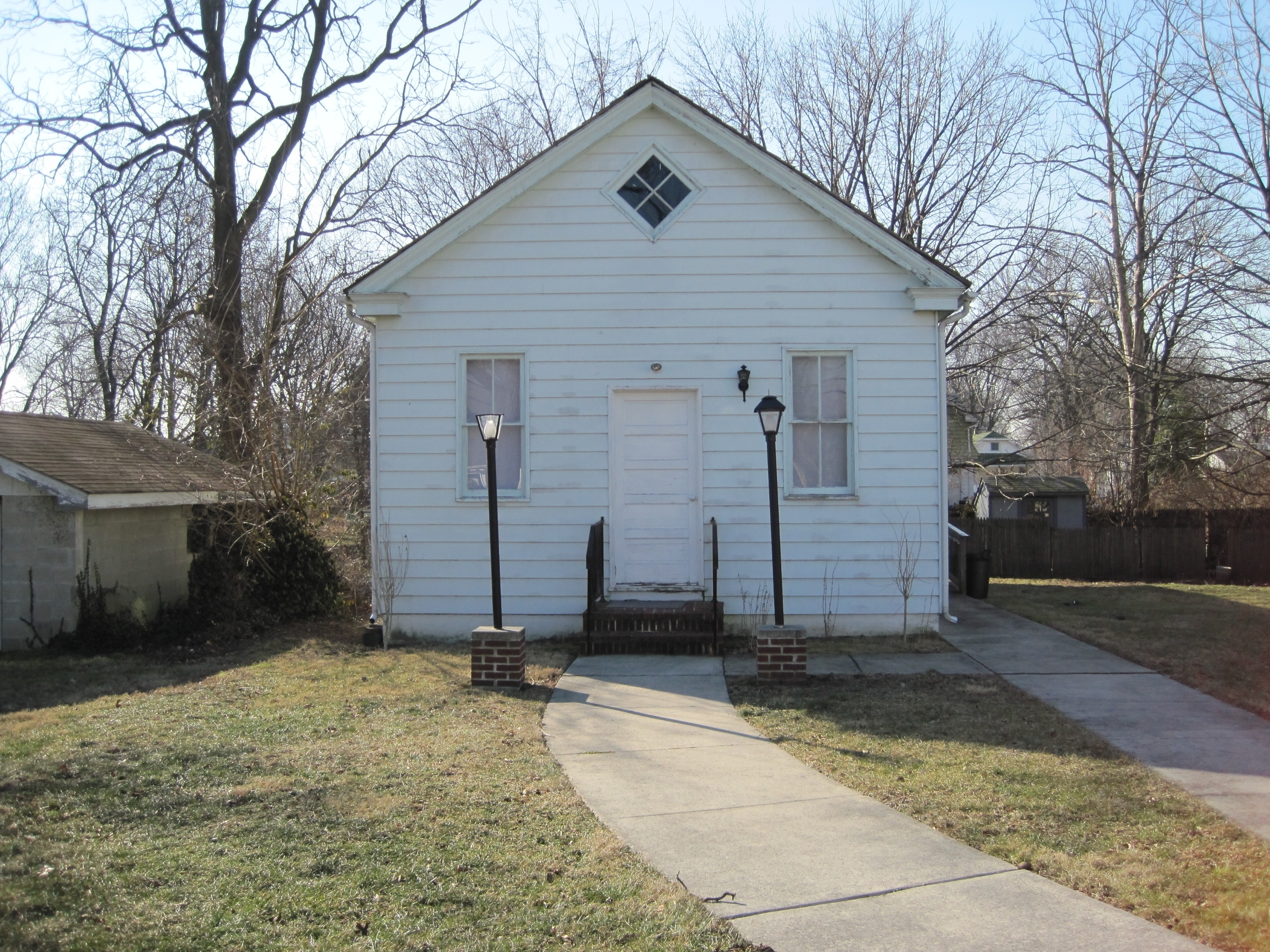

- Location within Gloucester County, New Jersey Location within New Jersey Location within the United States
- Location: 53-55 Carpenter Street, Woodbury, New Jersey
- Coordinates: 39°49′53″N 75°9′18″W
- Area: 0.3 acres (0.12 ha)
- Built: 1840
- Architect: Tatum, Joseph
- Architectural style: Greek Revival
- NRHP reference No.: 97000934
- NJRHP No.: 3176

Significant dates
- Added to NRHP: August 21, 1997
- Designated NJRHP: July 7, 1997

Carpenter Street School is located in Woodbury, Gloucester County, New Jersey, United States. The school was built in 1840 and was added to the National Register of Historic Places on August 21, 1997.

== See also ==
- National Register of Historic Places listings in Gloucester County, New Jersey
