= Richwoods Township =

Richwoods Township may refer to:

- Richwoods Township, Jackson County, Arkansas, in Jackson County, Arkansas
- Richwoods Township, Lawrence County, Arkansas, in Lawrence County, Arkansas
- Richwoods Township, Lonoke County, Arkansas, in Lonoke County, Arkansas
- Richwoods Township, Sharp County, Arkansas, in Sharp County, Arkansas
- Richwoods Township, Stone County, Arkansas, in Stone County, Arkansas
- Richwoods Township, Peoria County, Illinois
- Richwoods Township, Miller County, Missouri
- Richwoods Township, Washington County, Missouri

== See also ==
- Richwood Township (disambiguation)
