= Richwood, New Jersey =

Populated place in Gloucester County, New Jersey, US

- Census-designated place
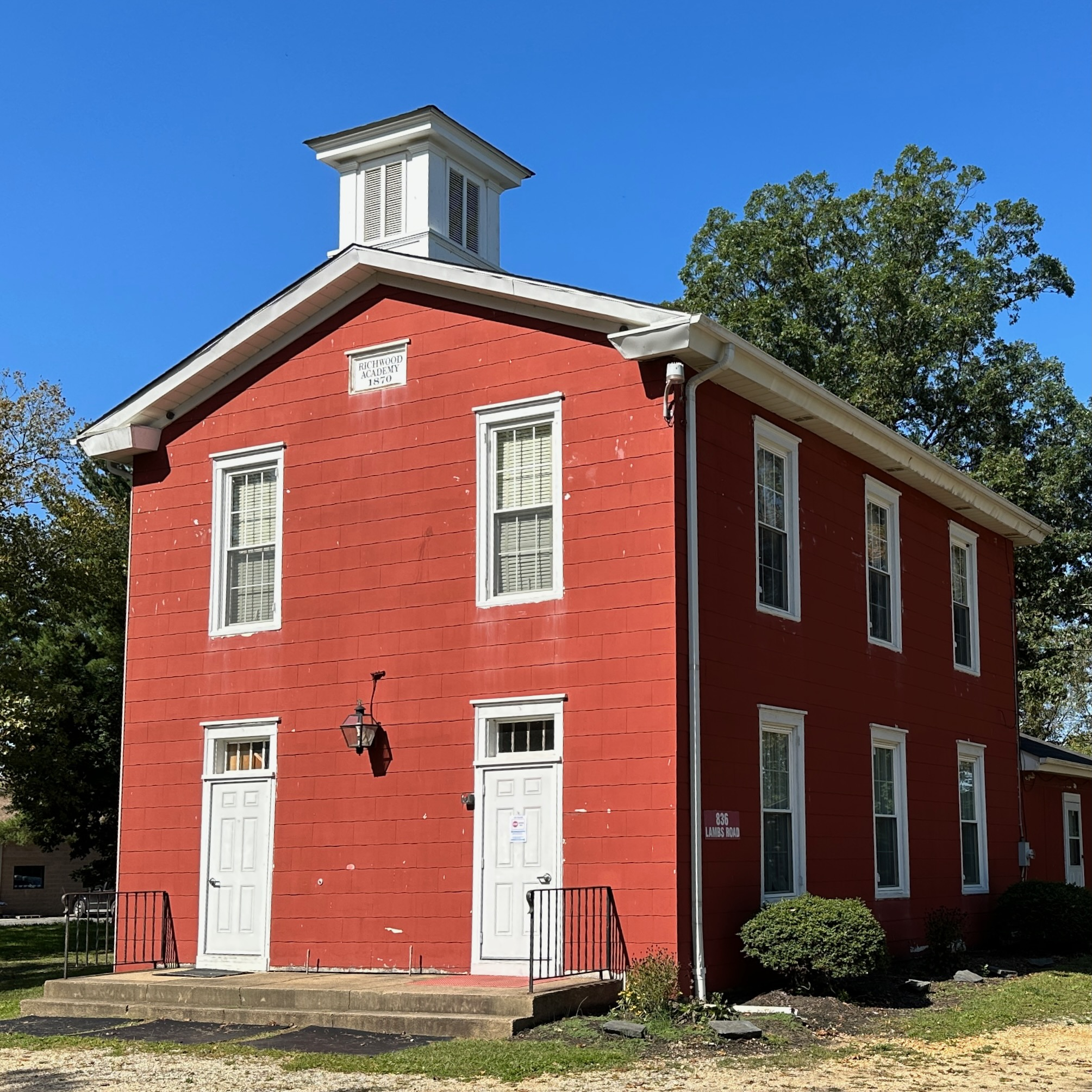
- Richwood Academy, listed on the National Register of Historic Places

- Location in Gloucester County Location in New Jersey Location in the United States
- Coordinates: 39.715978°N 75.172472°W
- Country: United States
- State: New Jersey
- County: Gloucester
- Townships: Harrison and Mantua

Area
  - Total: 8.92 sq mi (23.09 km^{2})
  - Land: 8.86 sq mi (22.94 km^{2})
  - Water: 0.058 sq mi (0.15 km^{2}) 0.68%
- Elevation: 138 ft (42 m)

Population (2020)
  - Total: 3,577
  - Density: 403.7/sq mi (155.9/km^{2})
- Time zone: UTC−05:00 (Eastern (EST))
  - Summer (DST): UTC−04:00 (Eastern (EDT))
- ZIP Code: 08074
- Area code: 856
- FIPS code: 34-62820
- GNIS feature ID: 02584022

Richwood is an unincorporated community and census-designated place (CDP) located in Gloucester County, in the U.S. state of New Jersey, that is split between Harrison Township (with 3,400 of the CDP's residents) and Mantua Township (with 59 of the total). As of the 2020 United States census, the CDP’s population was 3,577, an increase of 118 (+3.4%) from the 3,459 enumerated at the 2010 U.S. census. The community was once known as Mount Pleasant.

== Geography ==
According to the United States Census Bureau, the CDP had a total area of 8.910 square miles (23.077 km^{2}), including 8.850 square miles (22.921 km^{2}) of land and 0.060 square miles (0.157 km^{2}) of water (0.68%).

== Demographics ==
Historical population
Census	Pop.	Note	%±
2010	3,459		—
2020	3,577		3.4%
2010 2020

Richwood first appeared as a census designated place in the 2010 U.S. census.

=== Racial and ethnic composition ===
Richwood CDP, New Jersey – Racial and ethnic composition Note: the US Census treats Hispanic/Latino as an ethnic category. This table excludes Latinos from the racial categories and assigns them to a separate category. Hispanics/Latinos may be of any race.
Race / Ethnicity (NH = Non-Hispanic)	Pop 2010	Pop 2020	% 2010	% 2020
White alone (NH)	3,047	3,003	88.09%	83.95%
Black or African American alone (NH)	125	128	3.61%	3.58%
Native American or Alaska Native alone (NH)	2	0	0.06%	0.00%
Asian alone (NH)	135	169	3.90%	4.72%
Native Hawaiian or Pacific Islander alone (NH)	0	0	0.00%	0.00%
Other race alone (NH)	2	18	0.06%	0.50%
Mixed race or Multiracial (NH)	50	115	1.45%	3.21%
Hispanic or Latino (any race)	98	144	2.83%	4.03%
Total	3,459	3,577	100.00%	100.00%

=== 2020 census ===
As of the 2020 census, Richwood had a population of 3,577. The median age was 39.1 years. 26.3% of residents were under the age of 18 and 11.3% of residents were 65 years of age or older. For every 100 females there were 93.8 males, and for every 100 females age 18 and over there were 96.6 males age 18 and over.

35.3% of residents lived in urban areas, while 64.7% lived in rural areas.

There were 1,079 households in Richwood, of which 46.0% had children under the age of 18 living in them. Of all households, 74.5% were married-couple households, 9.2% were households with a male householder and no spouse or partner present, and 13.8% were households with a female householder and no spouse or partner present. About 11.3% of all households were made up of individuals and 5.0% had someone living alone who was 65 years of age or older.

There were 1,135 housing units, of which 4.9% were vacant. The homeowner vacancy rate was 1.4% and the rental vacancy rate was 10.0%.

=== 2010 census ===
The 2010 United States census counted 3,459 people, 1,055 households, and 902 families in the CDP. The population density was 390.9 per square mile (150.9/km^{2}). There were 1,101 housing units at an average density of 124.4 per square mile (48.0/km^{2}). The racial makeup was 89.65% (3,101) White, 3.76% (130) Black or African American, 0.06% (2) Native American, 4.22% (146) Asian, 0.00% (0) Pacific Islander, 0.55% (19) from other races, and 1.76% (61) from two or more races. Hispanic or Latino of any race were 2.83% (98) of the population.

Of the 1,055 households, 50.9% had children under the age of 18; 76.3% were married couples living together; 5.2% had a female householder with no husband present and 14.5% were non-families. Of all households, 11.9% were made up of individuals and 4.5% had someone living alone who was 65 years of age or older. The average household size was 3.27 and the average family size was 3.57.

32.0% of the population were under the age of 18, 7.9% from 18 to 24, 21.5% from 25 to 44, 30.5% from 45 to 64, and 8.1% who were 65 years of age or older. The median age was 38.5 years. For every 100 females, the population had 98.5 males. For every 100 females ages 18 and older there were 102.5 males.

== Transportation ==
Exit 50B on Route 55 is about a half mile from the center of Richwood. The exit provides access to Richwood, via U.S. Route 322. Rowan University in nearby Glassboro is about 1¼ miles from Richwood.

== See also ==
- Richwood Methodist Church
