= National Park, New Jersey =

Borough in Gloucester County, New Jersey, US

- Borough
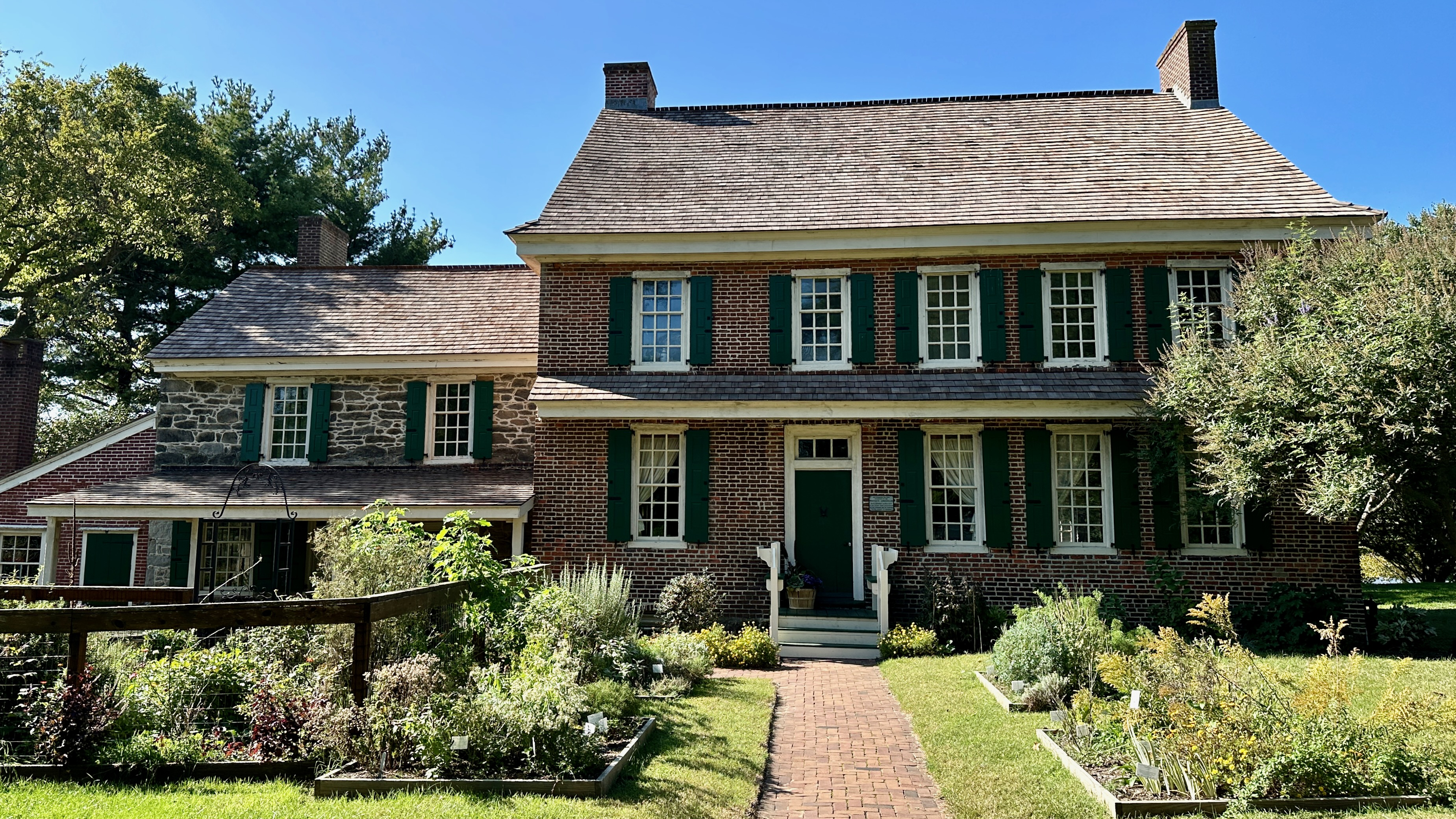
- The James and Ann Whitall House on the Red Bank Battlefield, where the Revolutionary War's Battle of Red Bank was fought on October 22, 1777
- Motto: Home to the Red Bank Battlefield
- Location of National Park in Gloucester County highlighted in red (left). Inset map: Location of Gloucester County in New Jersey highlighted in orange (right).

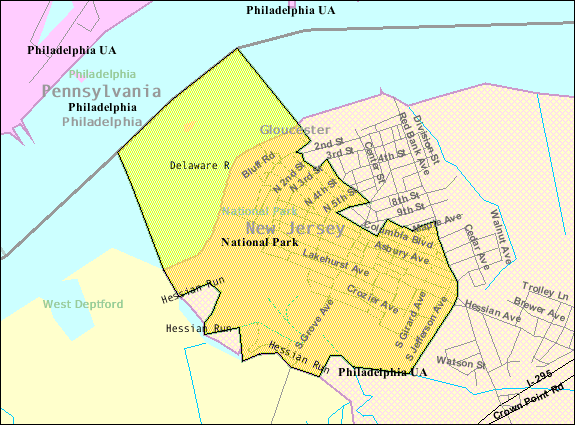
- Census Bureau map of National Park, New Jersey

- Location in Gloucester County Location in New Jersey Location in the United States
- Coordinates: 39.867297°N 75.185621°W
- Country: United States
- State: New Jersey
- County: Gloucester
- Incorporated: April 15, 1902

Government
  - Type: Borough
  - Body: Borough Council
  - Mayor: Dennis Burke (D, term ends December 31, 2027)
  - Administrator / Municipal clerk: Joy Gunn

Area
  - Total: 1.44 sq mi (3.73 km^{2})
  - Land: 1.01 sq mi (2.61 km^{2})
  - Water: 0.43 sq mi (1.12 km^{2}) 30.14%
  - Rank: 457th of 565 in state 20th of 24 in county
- Elevation: 13 ft (4.0 m)

Population (2020)
  - Total: 3,026
  - Estimate (2023): 3,063
  - Rank: 448th of 565 in state 21st of 24 in county
  - Density: 3,003.7/sq mi (1,159.7/km^{2})
  - Rank: 218th of 565 in state 6th of 24 in county
- Time zone: UTC−05:00 (Eastern (EST))
  - Summer (DST): UTC−04:00 (Eastern (EDT))
- ZIP Code: 08063
- Area code: 856
- FIPS code: 3401549680
- GNIS feature ID: 0885314
- Website: www.nationalparknj.com

National Park is a borough in Gloucester County, in the U.S. state of New Jersey. As of the 2020 United States census, the borough's population was 3,026, a decrease of 10 (−0.3%) from the 2010 census count of 3,036, which in turn reflected a decline of 169 (−5.3%) from the 3,205 counted in the 2000 census. Despite its name, National Park is neither a national park nor associated with one. It was developed in 1895 as a religious retreat called National Park on the Delaware by the Methodist Episcopal Church.

National Park had the 18th-highest property tax rate in New Jersey in 2020, with an equalized rate of 4.446% compared to 3.212% in the county as a whole and a statewide average of 2.279%.

== History ==
The community was historically known as Red Bank, for the color of the soil. It was established c. 1621–1622 by the Whitall family and others. The county court met here in 1686.

=== American Revolutionary War ===
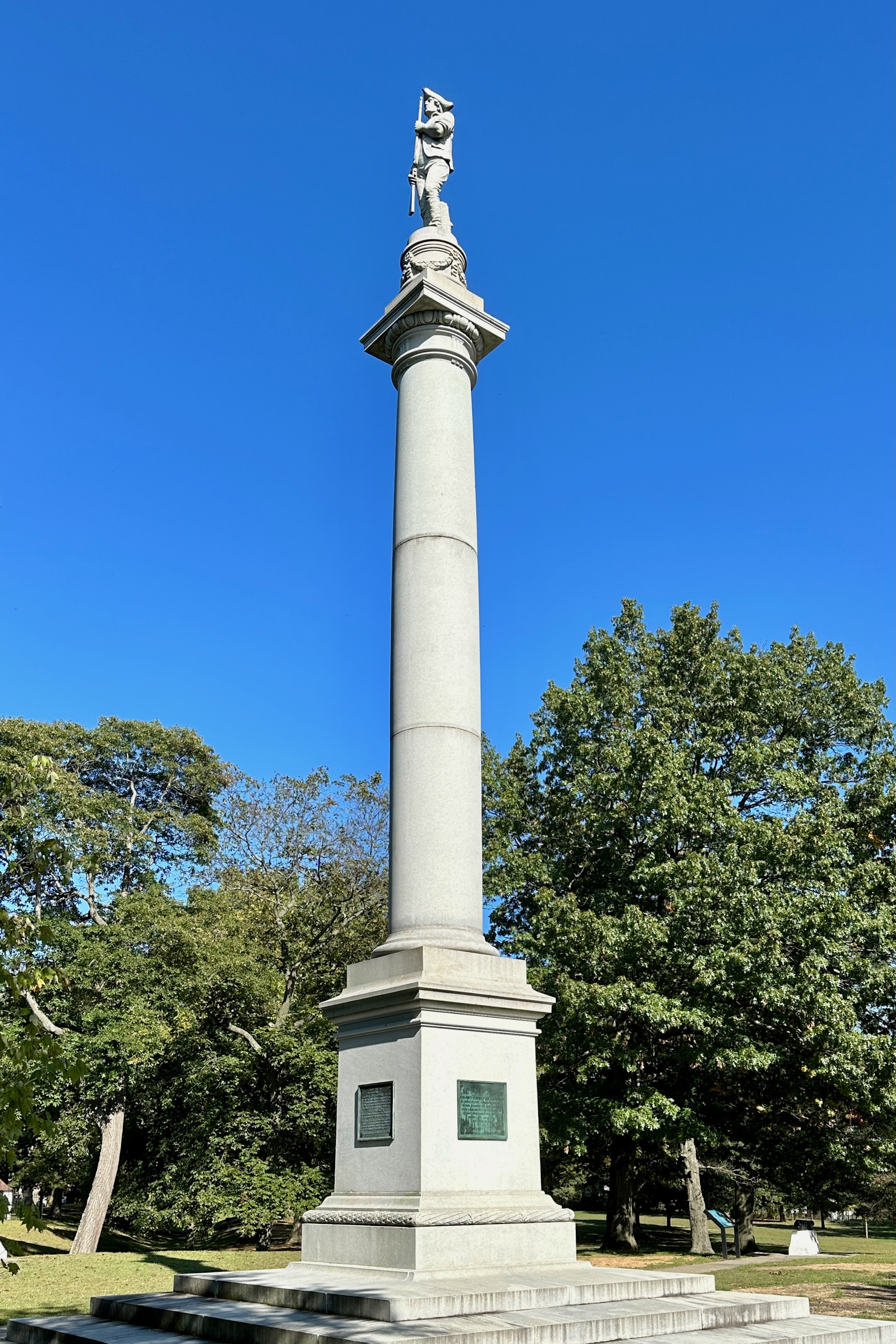
The Red Bank Battle Monument, dedicated in 1906

In 1777, during the American Revolutionary War, the Continental Army under command of George Washington constructed two forts on the Delaware River to block the approach to Philadelphia: Fort Mifflin on the Pennsylvania side and Fort Mercer on the New Jersey side. The fort was named in honor of Brigadier General Hugh Mercer, who died earlier that year in the Battle of Princeton. A park, monument, and museum commemorate Fort Mifflin on its original site.

On October 22, 1777, in the Battle of Red Bank, an attack by 900 Hessian troops, serving under British Major General William Howe, who then occupied Philadelphia, was repelled, with heavy losses on the Hessian side, including the death of their commander, Colonel Carl Emil Kurt von Donop, by the 600 Continental Army defenders under Colonel Christopher Greene. After the loss of Fort Mifflin, Fort Mercer was abandoned without a fight when Lord Charles Cornwallis landed 2,000 British troops nearby on November 18.

=== 19th century ===
The area was first developed in 1895 as National Park on the Delaware by James E. Lake, who also fostered the development of Ocean City, as a religious retreat for members of the Methodist Episcopal Church. The founder, the Rev. James E. Lake, also created Ocean City, New Jersey.

=== 20th century ===
National Park was formally established as a borough by an act of the New Jersey Legislature on April 15, 1902, from portions of West Deptford Township. The town's name likely originated as a reference to the county park at Red Bank Battlefield.

== Geography ==
According to the U.S. Census Bureau, the borough had a total area of 1.44 square miles (3.73 km^{2}), including 1.01 square miles (2.61 km^{2}) of land and 0.43 square miles (1.12 km^{2}) of water (30.14%). The borough borders West Deptford Township and the Delaware River. The Delaware River shore faces the southern end of Philadelphia, across from the mouth of the Schuylkill River and Fort Mifflin.

== Demographics ==
Historical population
Census	Pop.	Note	%±
1910	325		—
1920	1,000		207.7%
1930	1,828		82.8%
1940	1,977		8.2%
1950	2,419		22.4%
1960	3,380		39.7%
1970	3,730		10.4%
1980	3,552		−4.8%
1990	3,413		−3.9%
2000	3,205		−6.1%
2010	3,036		−5.3%
2020	3,026		−0.3%
2023 (est.)	3,063	▲	1.2%
Population sources: 1910–2000; 1910–1920 1910; 1910–1930 1940–2000; 2000 2010 2020

=== 2020 census ===
As of the 2020 census, National Park had a population of 3,026. The median age was 40.5 years. 21.0% of residents were under the age of 18 and 16.0% of residents were 65 years of age or older. For every 100 females there were 97.0 males, and for every 100 females age 18 and over there were 93.4 males age 18 and over.

100.0% of residents lived in urban areas, while 0.0% lived in rural areas.

There were 1,127 households in National Park, of which 33.7% had children under the age of 18 living in them. Of all households, 48.3% were married-couple households, 17.2% were households with a male householder and no spouse or partner present, and 25.3% were households with a female householder and no spouse or partner present. About 21.7% of all households were made up of individuals and 9.8% had someone living alone who was 65 years of age or older.

There were 1,192 housing units, of which 5.5% were vacant. The homeowner vacancy rate was 2.4% and the rental vacancy rate was 5.9%.

Racial composition as of the 2020 census
Race	Number	Percent
White	2,609	86.2%
Black or African American	125	4.1%
American Indian and Alaska Native	13	0.4%
Asian	18	0.6%
Native Hawaiian and Other Pacific Islander	0	0.0%
Some other race	48	1.6%
Two or more races	213	7.0%
Hispanic or Latino (of any race)	152	5.0%

=== 2010 census ===
The 2010 United States census counted 3,036 people, 1,092 households, and 816 families in the borough. The population density was 3,023.2 inhabitants per square mile (1,167.3/km^{2}). There were 1,153 housing units at an average density of 1,148.1 per square mile (443.3/km^{2}). The racial makeup was 96.28% (2,923) White, 1.35% (41) Black or African American, 0.16% (5) Native American, 0.59% (18) Asian, 0.00% (0) Pacific Islander, 0.13% (4) from other races, and 1.48% (45) from two or more races. Hispanic or Latino of any race were 2.04% (62) of the population.

Of the 1,092 households, 30.1% had children under the age of 18; 52.5% were married couples living together; 15.4% had a female householder with no husband present and 25.3% were non-families. Of all households, 20.2% were made up of individuals and 7.9% had someone living alone who was 65 years of age or older. The average household size was 2.77 and the average family size was 3.18.

23.1% of the population were under the age of 18, 9.7% from 18 to 24, 25.5% from 25 to 44, 30.3% from 45 to 64, and 11.5% who were 65 years of age or older. The median age was 39.2 years. For every 100 females, the population had 94.7 males. For every 100 females ages 18 and older there were 93.2 males.

The Census Bureau's 2006–2010 American Community Survey showed that (in 2010 inflation-adjusted dollars) median household income was $65,852 (with a margin of error of +/− $5,987) and the median family income was $70,341 (+/− $8,049). Males had a median income of $51,886 (+/− $2,493) versus $32,788 (+/− $5,594) for females. The per capita income for the borough was $26,699 (+/− $2,574). About 4.1% of families and 4.3% of the population were below the poverty line, including 6.8% of those under age 18 and 6.7% of those age 65 or over.

=== 2000 census ===
As of the 2000 census, there were 3,205 people, 1,111 households, and 865 families residing in the borough. The population density was 3,219.0 inhabitants per square mile (1,242.9/km^{2}). There were 1,165 housing units at an average density of 1,170.1 per square mile (451.8/km^{2}). The racial makeup of the borough was 98.35% White, 0.09% Black, 0.25% Native American, 0.25% Asian, 0.03% Pacific Islander, 0.53% from other races, and 0.50% from two or more races. Hispanic or Latino of any race were 1.44% of the population.

There were 1,111 households, out of which 37.3% had children under the age of 18 living with them, 58.2% were married couples living together, 14.0% had a female householder with no husband present, and 22.1% were non-families. 18.6% of all households were made up of individuals, and 8.6% had someone living alone who was 65 years of age or older. The average household size was 2.86 and the average family size was 3.24.

In the borough, the population was spread out, with 26.4% under the age of 18, 9.3% from 18 to 24, 29.7% from 25 to 44, 22.2% from 45 to 64, and 12.5% who were 65 years of age or older. The median age was 37 years. For every 100 females, there were 99.2 males. For every 100 females age 18 and over, there were 93.8 males.

The median income for a household in the borough was $48,534, and the median income for a family was $51,535. Males had a median income of $35,102 versus $27,398 for females. The per capita income for the borough was $18,048. About 6.5% of families and 7.6% of the population were below the poverty line, including 6.7% of those under age 18 and 7.9% of those age 65 or over.

== Government ==
=== Local government ===
National Park is governed under the borough form of New Jersey municipal government, which is used in 218 municipalities (of the 564) statewide, making it the most common form of government in New Jersey. The governing body is comprised of the mayor and the borough council, with all positions elected at-large on a partisan basis as part of the November general election. The mayor is elected directly by the voters to a four-year term of office. The borough council includes six members elected to serve three-year terms on a staggered basis, with two seats coming up for election each year in a three-year cycle. The borough form of government used by National Park is a "weak mayor / strong council" government in which council members act as the legislative body with the mayor presiding at meetings and voting only in the event of a tie. The mayor can veto ordinances subject to an override by a two-thirds majority vote of the council. The mayor makes committee and liaison assignments for council members, and most appointments are made by the mayor with the advice and consent of the council.

As of 2025, the mayor of National Park is Democrat Dennis Burke, whose term of office ends December 31, 2027. Members of the Borough Council are Jason Bish (D, 2026), Sean D. Grannan Sr. (D, 2027), Aimee Hart (D, 2025), Julie MacDonald (D, 2025), Ronald Sparks Jr. (D, 2027) and Kate Wadsworth (D, 2026).

Aimee Hart was appointed to fill the seat expiring in December 2022 that had been held by Joy Gunn.

Joy Hibbs Gunn was selected by the borough council in August 2014 from three names nominated by the municipal Democratic committee to fill the vacant seat of Dennis Mehaffey, who resigned in the previous month due to conflicts with his work schedule. in the November 2014 general election, Hibbs was elected to serve the balance of the term though December 2016.

=== Federal, state, and county representation ===
National Park is located in the 1st Congressional District and is part of New Jersey's 3rd state legislative district.

For the 119th United States Congress, New Jersey's 1st congressional district is represented by Donald Norcross (D, Camden). New Jersey is represented in the United States Senate by Democrats Cory Booker (Newark, term ends 2027) and Andy Kim (Moorestown, term ends 2031).

For the 2026–2027 session, the 3rd legislative district of the New Jersey Legislature is represented in the State Senate by John Burzichelli (D, Paulsboro) and in the General Assembly by David Bailey (D, Woodstown) and Heather Simmons (D, Glassboro).

Gloucester County is governed by a board of county commissioners, whose seven members are elected at-large to three-year terms of office on a staggered basis in partisan elections, with either two or three seats coming up for election each year. At a reorganization meeting held each January, the Board selects a Director and a Deputy Director from among its members. As of 2025, Gloucester County's Commissioners are:

Director Frank J. DiMarco (D, Deptford Township, 2025), Matt Weng (D, Pitman, 2026), Joann Gattinelli (D, Washington Township, 2026), Nicholas DeSilvio (R, Franklin Township, 2027), Denice DiCarlo (D, West Deptford Township, 2025) Deputy Director Jim Jefferson (D, Woodbury, 2026) and Christopher Konawel Jr. (R, Glassboro, 2027).

Gloucester County's constitutional officers are: Clerk James N. Hogan (D, Franklin Township; 2027), Sheriff Carmel Morina (D, Greenwich Township; 2027) and Surrogate Giuseppe "Joe" Chila (D, Woolwich Township; 2028).

=== Politics ===
United States presidential election results for National Park 2024 2020 2016 2012 2008 2004
Year	Republican		Democratic		Third party(ies)	
Year	No.	%	No.	%	No.	%
2024	841	55.33%	650	42.76%	29	1.91%
2020	823	52.35%	717	45.61%	32	2.04%
2016	627	50.61%	550	44.39%	62	5.00%
2012	442	34.42%	819	63.79%	23	1.79%
2008	560	37.89%	892	60.35%	26	1.76%
2004	536	37.77%	868	61.17%	15	1.06%

As of March 2011, there were a total of 2,045 registered voters in National Park, of which 1,021 (49.9%) were registered as Democrats, 213 (10.4%) were registered as Republicans and 811 (39.7%) were registered as Unaffiliated. There were no voters registered to other parties.

Gubernatorial election results for National Park
Year	Republican		Democratic		Third party(ies)	
Year	No.	%	No.	%	No.	%
2025	553	47.14%	607	51.75%	13	1.11%
2021	511	56.90%	380	42.32%	7	0.78%
2017	304	43.24%	379	53.91%	20	2.84%
2013	469	64.60%	232	31.96%	25	3.44%
2009	355	41.28%	408	47.44%	97	11.28%
2005	235	27.81%	567	67.10%	43	5.09%

In the 2020 Presidential election, Republican Donald Trump received 823 votes and Democrat Joe Biden received 717 votes. In the 2016 presidential election, Republican Donald Trump received 627 votes, ahead of Democrat Hillary Clinton with 550 votes. In the 2012 presidential election, Democrat Barack Obama received 63.8% of the vote (819 cast), ahead of Republican Mitt Romney with 34.4% (442 votes), and other candidates with 1.8% (23 votes), among the 1,301 ballots cast by the borough's 2,064 registered voters (17 ballots were spoiled), for a turnout of 63.0%. In the 2008 presidential election, Democrat Barack Obama received 59.5% of the vote (892 cast), ahead of Republican John McCain with 37.3% (560 votes) and other candidates with 1.7% (26 votes), among the 1,500 ballots cast by the borough's 2,164 registered voters, for a turnout of 69.3%. In the 2004 presidential election, Democrat John Kerry received 60.9% of the vote (868 ballots cast), outpolling Republican George W. Bush with 37.6% (536 votes) and other candidates with 0.7% (15 votes), among the 1,426 ballots cast by the borough's 2,069 registered voters, for a turnout percentage of 68.9.

In the 2013 gubernatorial election, Republican Chris Christie received 64.6% of the vote (469 cast), ahead of Democrat Barbara Buono with 32.0% (232 votes), and other candidates with 3.4% (25 votes), among the 746 ballots cast by the borough's 2,041 registered voters (20 ballots were spoiled), for a turnout of 36.6%. In the 2009 gubernatorial election, Democrat Jon Corzine received 46.2% of the vote (408 ballots cast), ahead of Republican Chris Christie with 40.2% (355 votes), Independent Chris Daggett with 10.2% (90 votes) and other candidates with 0.8% (7 votes), among the 883 ballots cast by the borough's 2,095 registered voters, yielding a 42.1% turnout.

United States Senate election results for National Park1
Year	Republican		Democratic		Third party(ies)	
Year	No.	%	No.	%	No.	%
2024	727	49.46%	719	48.91%	24	1.63%
2018	494	50.67%	418	42.87%	63	6.46%
2012	373	29.94%	836	67.09%	37	2.97%
2006	294	32.03%	586	63.83%	38	4.14%

United States Senate election results for National Park2
Year	Republican		Democratic		Third party(ies)	
Year	No.	%	No.	%	No.	%
2020	764	49.55%	718	46.56%	60	3.89%
2014	230	37.89%	359	59.14%	18	2.97%
2013	161	47.63%	162	47.93%	15	4.44%
2008	450	32.42%	891	64.19%	47	3.39%

== Education ==
The National Park School District serves public school students in pre-kindergarten through sixth grade at National Park Elementary School. As of the 2021–22 school year, the district, comprised of one school, had an enrollment of 283 students and 28.6 classroom teachers (on an FTE basis), for a student–teacher ratio of 9.9:1.

Students in public school for seventh through twelfth grades attend Gateway Regional High School, which serves students from the boroughs of National Park, Wenonah, Westville and Woodbury Heights as part of the Gateway Regional High School District. As of the 2021–22 school year, the high school had an enrollment of 836 students and 82.9 classroom teachers (on an FTE basis), for a student–teacher ratio of 10.1:1.

Students are also eligible to attend Gloucester County Institute of Technology, a four-year high school in Deptford Township that provides technical and vocational education. Because GCIT is a public school, its students do not pay tuition.

The Roman Catholic Diocese of Camden operated St. Matthews School, which had campuses in National Park and the Verga section of West Deptford Township, New Jersey. In 2007 it was consolidated into Holy Trinity Regional School, in Deptford Township. In 2017, it was moved to the former St. Patrick's Building in Woodbury due to the superior condition of that building, according to the archdiocese. It opened as Holy Angels Catholic School which still operates. Guardian Angels Regional School is a K-8 school that operates under the auspices of the Diocese of Camden, and accepts students from National Park. Its PreK-3 campus is in Gibbstown while its 4-8 campus is in Paulsboro.

== Transportation ==
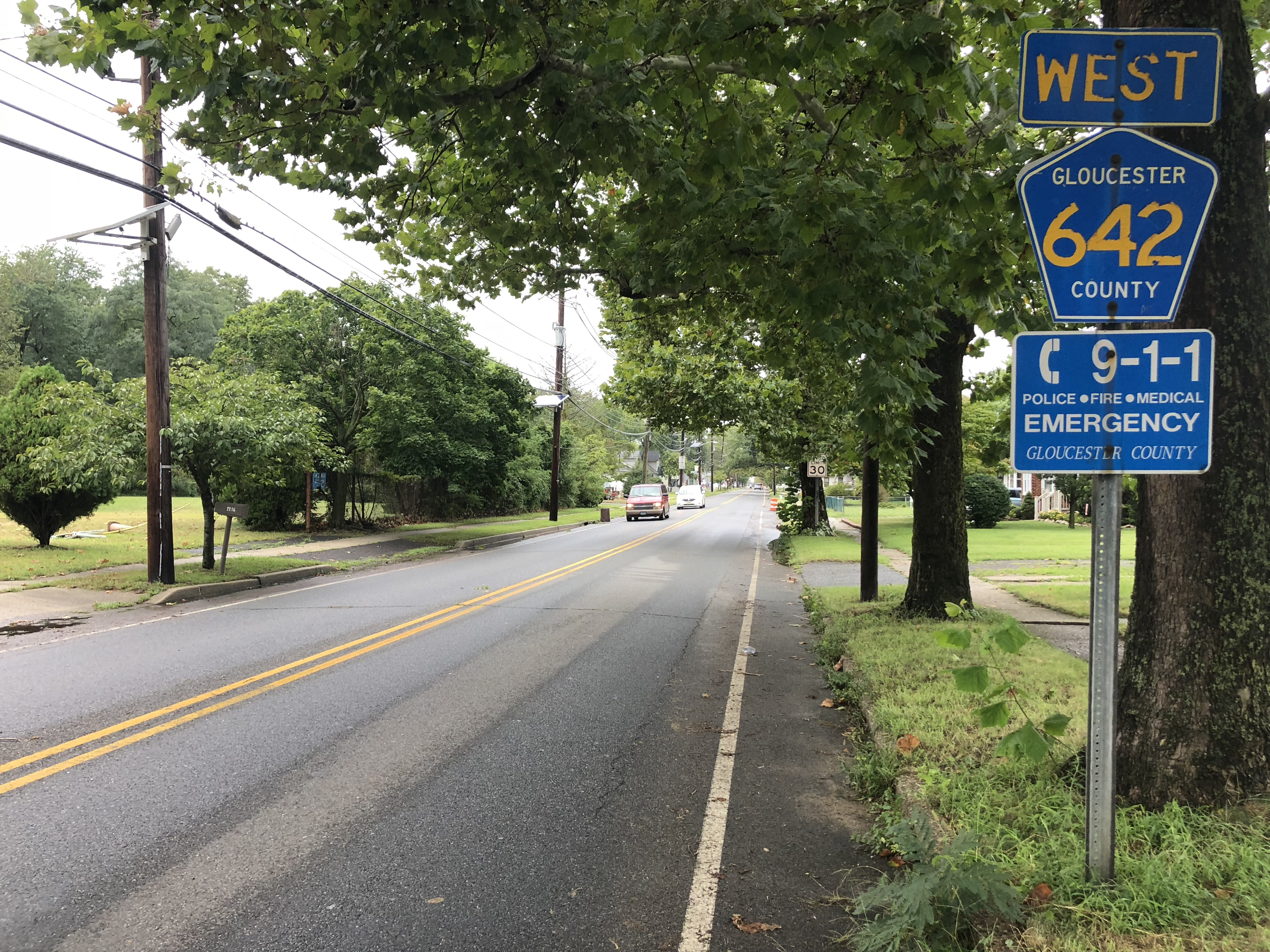
County Road 642 entering National Park

=== Roads and highways ===
As of May 2010, the borough had a total of 15.68 miles (25.23 km) of roadways, of which 12.59 miles (20.26 km) were maintained by the municipality and 3.09 miles (4.97 km) by Gloucester County.

County Route 642, Interstate 295, and U.S. Route 130 pass just outside the borough in neighboring West Deptford Township.

=== Public transportation ===
NJ Transit local bus service is available on the 455 route operating between Cherry Hill Mall and Paulsboro.

== Notable people ==
People who were born in, residents of, or otherwise closely associated with National Park include:

- Dennis Coralluzzo (1953–2001), professional wrestling promoter for the New Jersey division of the National Wrestling Alliance
- Nick Gage (born 1980), professional wrestler
- Sue Lowden (born 1952), Miss New Jersey 1973 winner who is a former chairwoman of the Nevada Republican Party and a former state senator in Nevada
- Eleanor Vadala (1923–2023), chemist, materials engineer and balloonist
