= Red Bank Battlefield =

- U.S. National Register of Historic Places
- U.S. National Historic Landmark
- New Jersey Register of Historic Places
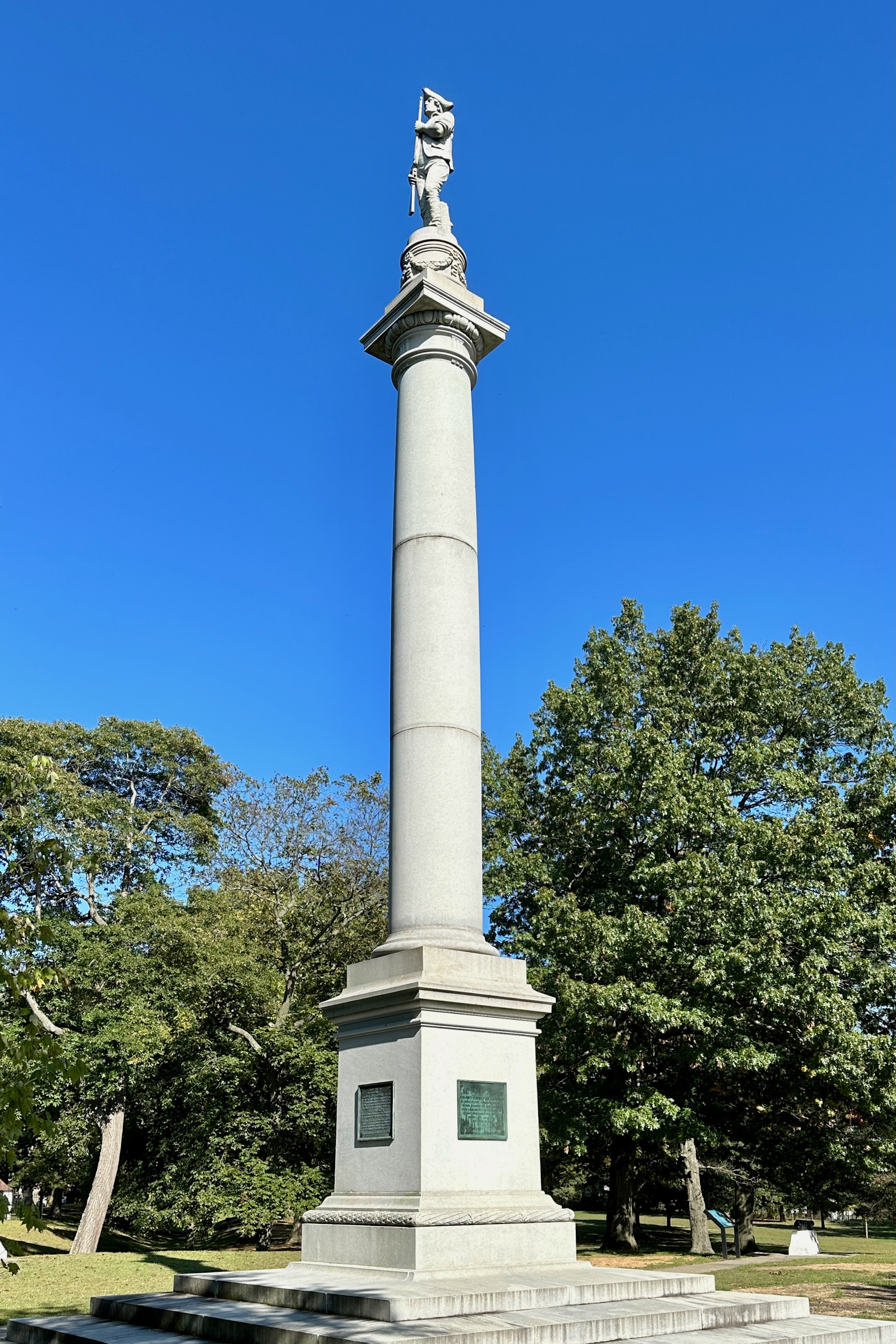
- Red Bank Battle Monument, dedicated 1906

- Location within Gloucester County, New Jersey Location within New Jersey Location within the United States
- Location: 100 Hessian Avenue, National Park, NJ 08063
- Coordinates: 39°52′13″N 75°11′25″W
- Area: 20 acres (8.1 ha)
- NRHP reference No.: 72000796
- NJRHP No.: 1405

Significant dates
- Added to NRHP: October 31, 1972
- Designated NHL: November 28, 1972
- Designated NJRHP: August 16, 1979

The Red Bank Battlefield is located along the Delaware River in National Park, Gloucester County, New Jersey. It was the location of the Battle of Red Bank in the American Revolutionary War on October 22, 1777. Fort Mercer and its sister, Fort Mifflin in Pennsylvania, defended the river and prevented the British from using it for transportation. The forts successfully delayed the British, but in the end, they were both destroyed or abandoned.

Today the site of the Battle of Red Bank still has the trenches and cannons used by the roughly 500 American soldiers fighting against 2000 British and Hessian soldiers. The Whitall House is an original home that was there during the battle and was used as a field hospital. It is open for tours today. The site is a part of the Gloucester County Parks system called Red Bank Battlefield Park.

== James and Ann Whitall House ==
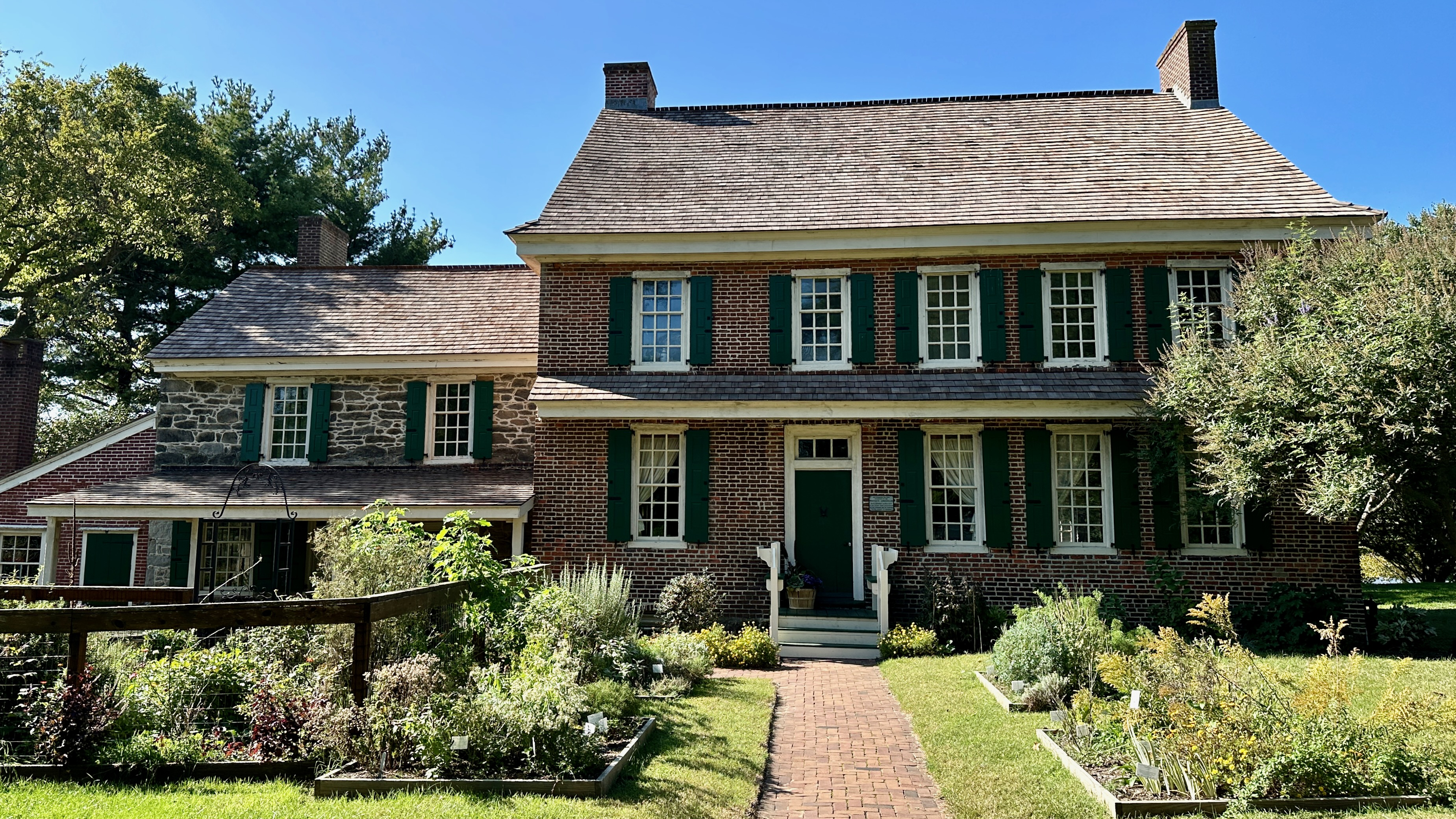
James and Ann Whitall House

The central feature of the park is the James and Ann Whitall House, located at the end of Hessian Avenue. It was built in 1748 by James Whitall Sr. and features Georgian architecture. The house was documented by the Historic American Buildings Survey (HABS) in 1936. This brick and stone house just outside the works of Fort Mercer, served as a hospital for some of the men wounded in the fighting. The house suffered damage during the battle. Ann Cooper Whitall had remained in the house during the fighting and tended to the wounded, earning her the epithet "Heroine of Red Bank."

== Park features ==
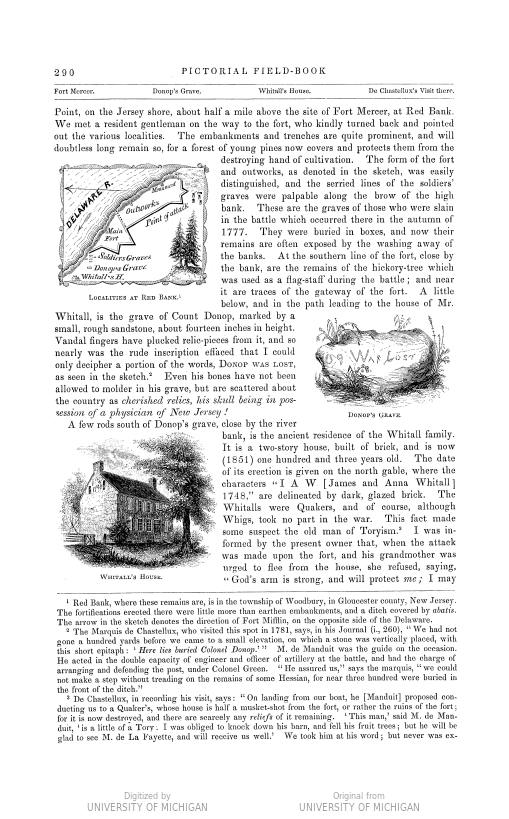
Von Donop Gravesite Battlefield of Red Bank

Although much of the battlefield has eroded into the Delaware River, some portions of Fort Mercer (named after Brigadier General Hugh Mercer, killed at the Battle of Princeton on January 3, 1777.) remain. The prominent historical feature of the park is the remains of the ditch which surrounded the now-gone earthworks. Around these works and along the riverbank are several period cannons, including four raised from the wrecks of the British man-of-war HMS Augusta and a British sloop, HMS Merlin. The three American cannons facing the Whitall House were found in 1935, buried on the site. Nearer to the Whitall House, a preserved section of the chevaux-de-frise river defenses of the Fort Mercer and Fort Mifflin system is displayed, along with various cannonballs recovered from the battlefield. Several monuments honor the combatants, including a monument to Col. Christopher Greene, commander of the 1st Rhode Island Regiment, a memorial to the fallen Hessian leader whose remains were buried on the grounds, and a 75-foot (23 m)-tall Battle of Red Bank Monument.

== Recognition of African Americans who fought for the Patriots ==
The 1st Rhode Island Regiment (also known as Varnum's Regiment, the 9th Continental Regiment, the Black Regiment, the Rhode Island Regiment, and Olney's Battalion) fought with the Americans.

The regiment included free African-Americans, enslaved people, and Native Americans. Masters of the enslaved people were to be paid fair market value for their slave upon completion of the war, at which time the enslaved person would be freed.

There is a historical marker at the battlefield that tells the story of the African Americans who served with the 1st Rhode Island Regiment.

== Notable burials ==
- Carl von Donop (1732–1777), Hessian colonel who fought for the British and died at the battle.

In June 2022, a mass grave containing the remains of 15 Hessian soldiers were discovered in land purchased by Gloucester County in 2020 at the northern end of the park. The remains were analyzed by a team of historians, archaeologists and forensic anthropologists, alongside the New Jersey State Police Forensic Anthropology Unit.

== Visiting ==
The 44-acre (180,000 m^{2}) park is open to visitors during daylight hours. The Whitall House may be visited during more limited hours. An annual reenactment of the battle takes place on the park grounds in October. In the early 1980s, a lifeguard was on duty and swimming was permitted in the Delaware River.

== See also ==
- Philadelphia campaign
- Fort Billingsport
- National Register of Historic Places listings in Gloucester County, New Jersey
