= Alfred Skinner =

Alfred Skinner may refer to:

- Alf Skinner (1894–1961), Canadian ice hockey right winger
- Alfred Ford Skinner (1862–1931), American politician from New Jersey
