= Brooklawn Public School District =

School district in Camden County, New Jersey, US

Address
- 301 Haakon Road Brooklawn, Camden County, New Jersey, 08030; United States
- Coordinates: 39.87912°N 75.119389°W

District information
- Grades: PreK to 8
- Superintendent: Samuel A. Rosetti
- Business administrator: Sam Dutkin
- Schools: 1

Students and staff
- Enrollment: 263 (as of 2023–24)
- Faculty: 33.3 FTEs
- Student–teacher ratio: 7.9:1

Other information
- District Factor Group: B
- Website: www.alicecostello.com
Ind.	Per pupil	District spending	Rank (*)	K-8 average	%± vs. average
1A	Total Spending	$14,052	2	$18,891	−25.6%
1	Budgetary Cost	10,287	3	14,159	−27.3%
2	Classroom Instruction	6,486	6	8,659	−25.1%
6	Support Services	1,408	7	2,167	−35.0%
8	Administrative Cost	1,079	1	1,547	−30.3%
10	Operations & Maintenance	1,027	4	1,612	−36.3%
13	Extracurricular Activities	173	43	104	66.3%
16	Median Teacher Salary	56,396	25	61,136
Data from NJDoE 2014 Taxpayers' Guide to Education Spending. *Of K-8 districts with up to 400 students. Lowest spending=1; Highest=71

The Brooklawn Public School District is a community public school district that serves public school students in pre-kindergarten through eighth grade from Brooklawn, in Camden County, in the U.S. state of New Jersey.

As of the 2023–24 school year, the district, comprised of one school, had an enrollment of 263 students and 33.3 classroom teachers (on an FTE basis), for a student–teacher ratio of 7.9:1.

The district participates in the Interdistrict Public School Choice Program at Alice Costello School, having been approved in July 2001 to participate in the program, which allows non-resident students to attend school in the district at no cost to their parents, with tuition covered by the resident district. Available slots are announced annually by grade.

The district had been classified by the New Jersey Department of Education as being in District Factor Group "B", the second lowest of eight groupings. District Factor Groups organize districts statewide to allow comparison by common socioeconomic characteristics of the local districts. From lowest socioeconomic status to highest, the categories are A, B, CD, DE, FG, GH, I and J.

For ninth through twelfth grades, public school students attend Gloucester City High School in Gloucester City as part of a sending/receiving relationship with the Gloucester City Public Schools. As of the 2023–24 school year, the high school had an enrollment of 731 students and 49.0 classroom teachers (on an FTE basis), for a student–teacher ratio of 14.9:1.

== Schools ==
Alice Costello School served 263 students in grades PreK-8 as of the 2023–24 school year.

- Samuel A. Rosetti, principal

== Administration ==
Core members of the district's administration are:

- Samuel A. Rosetti, superintendent
- Sam Dutkin, business administrator and board secretary

== Board of education ==
The district's board of education is comprised of nine members who set policy and oversee the fiscal and educational operation of the district through its administration. As a Type II school district, the board's trustees are elected directly by voters to serve three-year terms of office on a staggered basis, with three seats up for election each year held (since 2012) as part of the November general election. The board appoints a superintendent to oversee the district's day-to-day operations and a business administrator to supervise the business functions of the district.
