= Gloucester City =

Gloucester City may refer to:

- Gloucester City A.F.C., an English football club
- Gloucester City, New Jersey, a city in the United States
- Gloucester, Ontario, a former city in Ontario, amalgamated into the City of Ottawa in 2001
