= Borough (New Jersey) =

Type of local government subdivision in New Jersey, US

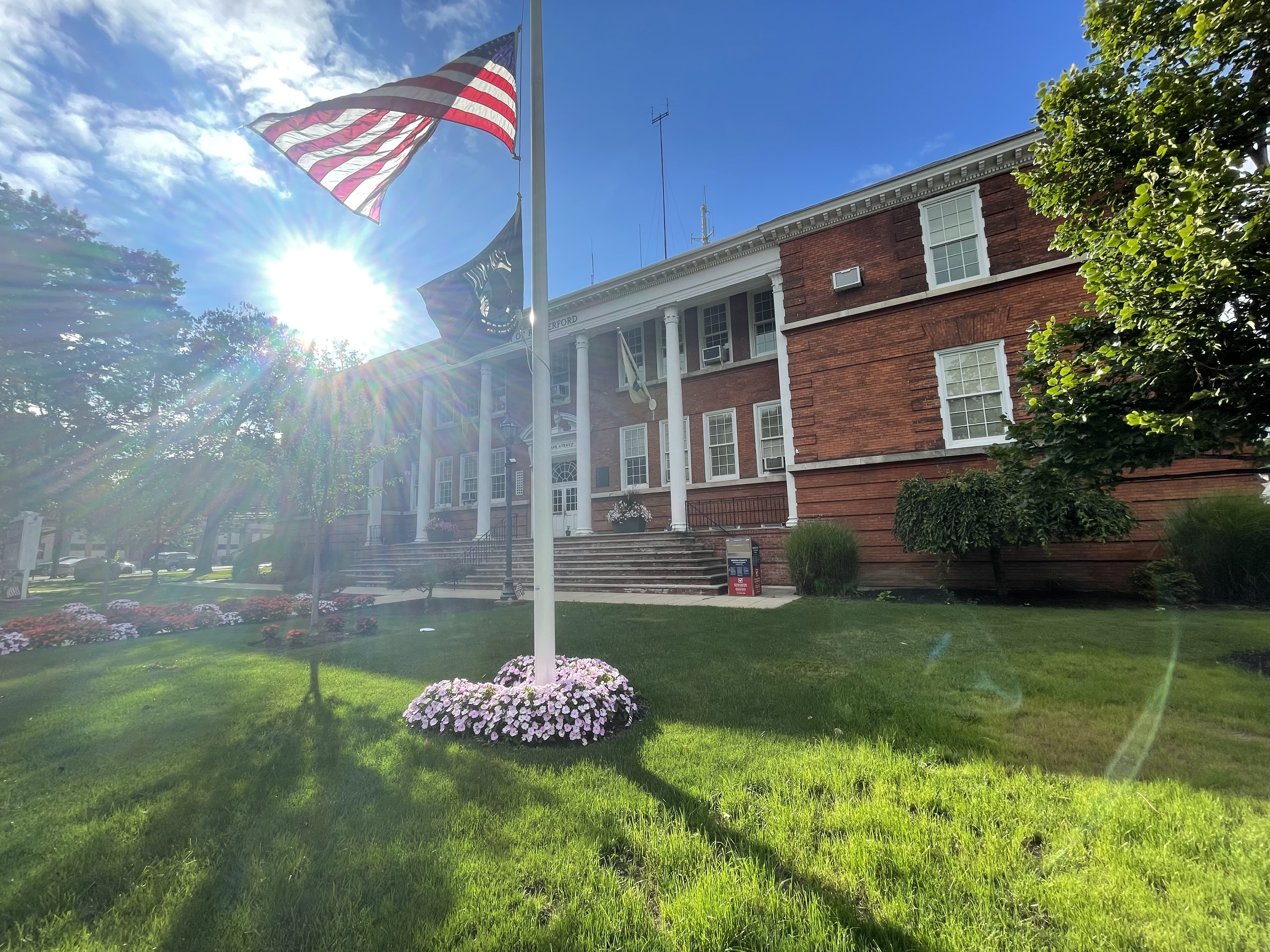
Borough Hall, Rutherford, in Bergen County

A borough (also spelled boro), in the context of local government in the U.S. state of New Jersey, is one of five types and one of eleven forms of municipal government (in addition to those established under a special charter).

Among New Jersey's 564 municipalities, the borough is the most common form of local government, though the majority of state residents actually reside in townships. In 2023 there were 253 boroughs in New Jersey. However, boroughs were not always so common. In 1875 only 17 boroughs had been created, all by special acts of the legislature. These original boroughs were subdivisions of townships, established by state charter; Elizabeth was the first, established by royal charter in 1740, within the now defunct Elizabeth Township. About half of them had been dissolved, or changed into other forms of government—often cities. In 1875, a constitutional amendment prohibited such local or special legislation. Bergen County is home to the highest number of boroughs of any New Jersey county, at 56.

== Legislation ==
The Borough Act of 1878 allowed any township (or portion thereof) with a land area of no more than four square miles (10 km^{2}) and a population not exceeding 5,000, to establish itself as an independent borough through a petition and referendum process on a self-executing basis. As enacted, a borough would be governed by an elected mayor (serving a one-year term) and a six-member council (elected to staggered three-year terms). The mayor would preside at council meetings, but had no vote except to break ties. This system resulted in a period, known as "boroughitis", where large numbers of small boroughs were created. In 1894, the Legislature passed an act requiring each township to have a single school district. A wave of borough incorporations followed, as one part of several townships decided that it would prefer the cost of being a separate municipality to paying for the other schools.

The Borough Act of 1897 amended the original Act, eliminating the self-executing incorporation feature of the earlier legislation. Henceforth, newly incorporated boroughs (or those seeking to dissolve or increase or decrease in size) required approval of the legislature. The elected mayor and six-member council were retained, with the mayor now serving a two-year term.

The Borough Act of 1987 was created to streamline borough law and clear away amendments, changes, and contradictory rules that had accumulated over the century of the Borough's existence as a form of government. The 1987 Act allowed for the delegation of executive responsibility to an appointed administrator.

=== Borough government ===
Traditionally, voters elect a mayor and six council members at-large in a partisan election. Only two boroughs, Roselle and Roselle Park, have ward structures with councils having five ward members and one at-large. The borough system has a weak mayor and the council performs most legislative and executive functions. This form of local government is used by 39% of the municipalities in New Jersey.

== List of boroughs ==
There are a total of 253 boroughs in New Jersey, which include:

- Allendale
- Allenhurst
- Allentown
- Alpha
- Alpine
- Andover Borough
- Atlantic Highlands
- Audubon Park
- Audubon
- Avalon
- Avon-by-the-Sea
- Barnegat Light
- Barrington
- Bay Head
- Beach Haven
- Beachwood
- Bellmawr
- Belmar
- Bergenfield
- Berlin Borough
- Bernardsville
- Bloomingdale
- Bloomsbury
- Bogota
- Bound Brook
- Bradley Beach
- Branchville
- Brielle
- Brooklawn
- Buena
- Butler
- Caldwell
- Califon
- Cape May Point
- Carlstadt
- Carteret
- Chatham Borough
- Chesilhurst
- Chester Borough
- Clayton
- Clementon
- Cliffside Park
- Closter
- Collingswood
- Cresskill
- Deal
- Demarest
- Dumont
- Dunellen
- East Newark
- East Rutherford
- Eatontown
- Edgewater
- Elmer
- Elmwood Park
- Emerson
- Englewood Cliffs
- Englishtown
- Essex Fells
- Fair Haven
- Fair Lawn
- Fairview
- Fanwood
- Far Hills
- Farmingdale
- Fieldsboro
- Flemington
- Florham Park
- Folsom
- Fort Lee
- Franklin Borough
- Franklin Lakes
- Freehold Borough
- Frenchtown
- Garwood
- Gibbsboro
- Glassboro
- Glen Gardner
- Glen Ridge
- Glen Rock
- Haddon Heights
- Haddonfield
- Haledon
- Hamburg
- Hampton Borough
- Harrington Park
- Harvey Cedars
- Hasbrouck Heights
- Haworth
- Hawthorne
- Helmetta
- Hi-Nella
- High Bridge
- Highland Park
- Highlands
- Hightstown
- Hillsdale
- Ho-Ho-Kus
- Hopatcong
- Hopewell Borough
- Interlaken
- Island Heights
- Jamesburg
- Keansburg
- Kenilworth
- Keyport
- Kinnelon
- Lake Como
- Lakehurst
- Laurel Springs
- Lavallette
- Lawnside
- Lebanon Borough
- Leonia
- Lincoln Park
- Lindenwold
- Little Ferry
- Little Silver
- Lodi
- Longport
- Madison
- Magnolia
- Manasquan
- Mantoloking
- Manville
- Matawan
- Maywood
- Medford Lakes
- Mendham Borough
- Merchantville
- Metuchen
- Middlesex
- Midland Park
- Milford
- Millstone
- Milltown
- Monmouth Beach
- Montvale
- Moonachie
- Morris Plains
- Mount Arlington
- Mount Ephraim
- Mountain Lakes
- Mountainside
- National Park
- Neptune City
- Netcong
- New Milford
- New Providence
- Newfield
- North Arlington
- North Caldwell
- North Haledon
- North Plainfield
- Northvale
- Norwood
- Oakland
- Oaklyn
- Ocean Gate
- Oceanport
- Ogdensburg
- Old Tappan
- Oradell
- Palisades
- Palmyra
- Paramus
- Park Ridge
- Paulsboro
- Peapack and Gladstone
- Pemberton Borough
- Pennington
- Penns Grove
- Pine Beach
- Pine Hill
- Pitman
- Point Pleasant Beach
- Point Pleasant
- Pompton Lakes
- Princeton
- Prospect Park
- Ramsey
- Raritan
- Red Bank
- Ridgefield
- Ringwood
- River Edge
- Riverdale
- Riverton
- Rockaway Borough
- Rockleigh
- Rocky Hill
- Roosevelt
- Roseland
- Roselle Park
- Roselle
- Rumson
- Runnemede
- Rutherford
- Saddle River
- Sayreville
- Sea Bright
- Sea Girt
- Seaside Heights
- Seaside Park
- Shiloh
- Ship Bottom
- Shrewsbury Borough
- Somerdale
- Somerville
- South Bound Brook
- South Plainfield
- South River
- South Toms River
- Spotswood
- Spring Lake Heights
- Spring Lake
- Stanhope
- Stockton
- Stone Harbor
- Stratford
- Surf City
- Sussex
- Swedesboro
- Tavistock
- Tenafly
- Teterboro
- Tinton Falls
- Totowa
- Tuckerton
- Union Beach
- Upper Saddle River
- Victory Gardens
- Waldwick
- Wallington
- Wanaque
- Washington Borough
- Watchung
- Wenonah
- West Cape May
- West Long Branch
- West Wildwood
- Westville
- Westwood
- Wharton
- Wildwood Crest
- Wood-Ridge
- Woodbine
- Woodbury Heights
- Woodcliff Lake
- Woodland Park
- Woodlynne
- Woodstown
- Wrightstown

== See also ==
- List of municipalities in New Jersey
- Alfred Ford Skinner
