= Westville, New Jersey =

Borough in Gloucester County, New Jersey, US

- Borough
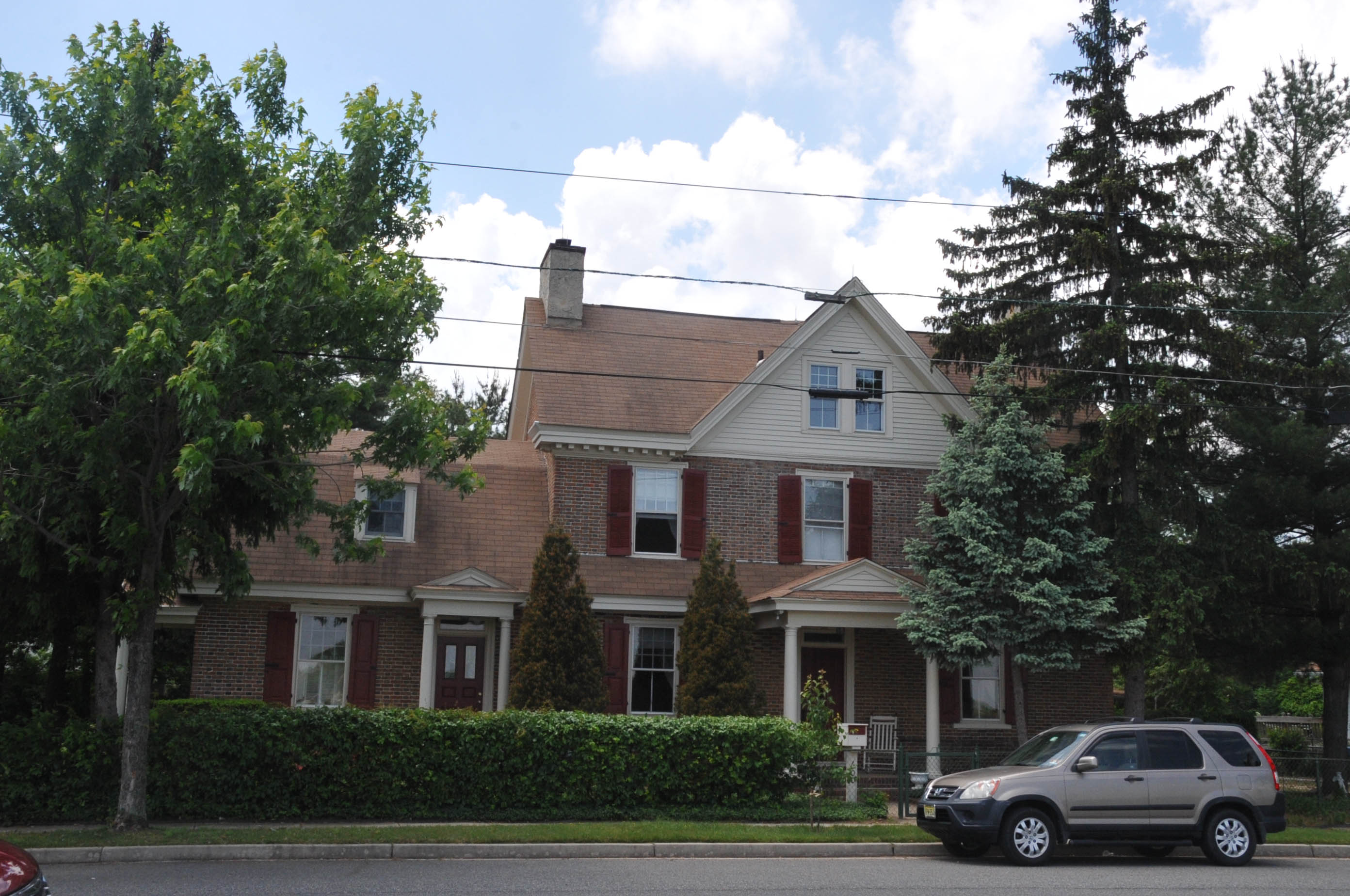
- Thomas West House, built c. 1746

- Seal
- Motto: "The Gateway to South Jersey"
- Map of Westville highlighted in Gloucester County. Inset: Location of Gloucester County in New Jersey.

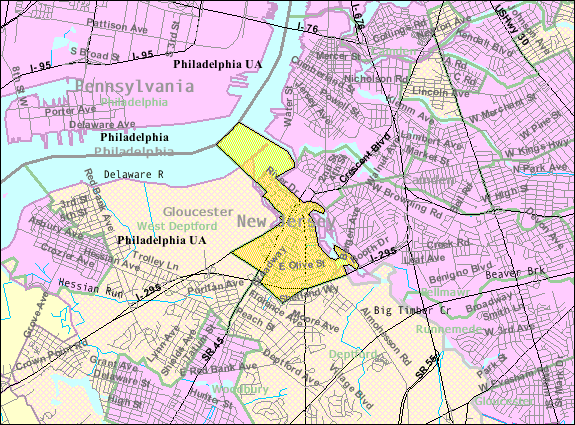
- Census Bureau map of Westville, New Jersey

- Location in Gloucester County Location in New Jersey Location in the United States
- Coordinates: 39.87069°N 75.129888°W
- Country: United States
- State: New Jersey
- County: Gloucester
- Incorporated: April 28, 1914
- Named for: Thomas West

Government
  - Type: Borough
  - Body: Borough Council
  - Mayor: Fritz H. Sims Jr. (D, term ends December 31, 2026)
  - Administrator: Ryan J. Giles
  - Municipal clerk: Ryan J. Giles

Area
  - Total: 1.38 sq mi (3.58 km^{2})
  - Land: 1.02 sq mi (2.65 km^{2})
  - Water: 0.36 sq mi (0.93 km^{2}) 25.94%
  - Rank: 463th of 565 in state 21st of 24 in county
- Elevation: 23 ft (7.0 m)

Population (2020)
  - Total: 4,264
  - Estimate (2023): 4,317
  - Rank: 405th of 565 in state 18th of 24 in county
  - Density: 4,165.2/sq mi (1,608.2/km^{2})
  - Rank: 149th of 565 in state 2nd of 24 in county
- Time zone: UTC−05:00 (Eastern (EST))
  - Summer (DST): UTC−04:00 (Eastern (EDT))
- ZIP Code: 08093
- Area code: 856
- FIPS code: 3401580120
- GNIS feature ID: 0885440
- Website: westville-nj.com

Westville is a borough in Gloucester County, in the U.S. state of New Jersey. As of the 2020 United States census, the borough's population was 4,264, a decrease of 24 (−0.6%) from the 2010 census count of 4,288, which in turn reflected a decline of 212 (−4.7%) from the 4,500 counted in the 2000 census. Westville has been called "The Gateway to South Jersey!"

Westville was formed as a borough by an act of the New Jersey Legislature on April 7, 1914, from portions of Deptford Township and West Deptford Township, based on the results of a referendum held on April 28, 1914. The borough was reincorporated on March 8, 1924. Legislation had been passed in 1900 to create Westville, but it had to have a majority vote in favor of the new municipality in both Deptford and West Deptford. The borough was named for Thomas West, who built a home in the area in 1775 that still stands.

The borough had the 17th-highest property tax rate in New Jersey, with an equalized rate of 4.502% in 2020, compared to 3.212% in the county as a whole and a statewide average of 2.279%.

== Geography ==
According to the U.S. Census Bureau, the borough had a total area of 1.38 square miles (3.58 km^{2}), including 1.02 square miles (2.65 km^{2}) of land and 0.36 square miles (0.93 km^{2}) of water (25.94%). Unincorporated communities, localities and place names located partially or completely within the borough include Newbold, South Westville and Westville Manor.

The borough borders the municipalities of Deptford Township and West Deptford Township in Gloucester County, Bellmawr, Brooklawn, and Gloucester City in Camden County, and Philadelphia, located across the Delaware River in Pennsylvania.

== Demographics ==
Historical population
Census	Pop.	Note	%±
1920	2,380		—
1930	3,462		45.5%
1940	3,585		3.6%
1950	4,731		32.0%
1960	4,951		4.7%
1970	5,170		4.4%
1980	4,786		−7.4%
1990	4,573		−4.5%
2000	4,500		−1.6%
2010	4,288		−4.7%
2020	4,264		−0.6%
2023 (est.)	4,317	▲	1.2%
Population sources: 1920–2000; 1920 1920–1930 1940–2000; 2000 2010 2020

=== 2020 census ===
As of the 2020 census, Westville had a population of 4,264. The median age was 40.1 years. 21.2% of residents were under the age of 18 and 13.5% of residents were 65 years of age or older. For every 100 females there were 98.8 males, and for every 100 females age 18 and over there were 94.2 males age 18 and over.

100.0% of residents lived in urban areas, while 0.0% lived in rural areas.

There were 1,754 households in Westville, of which 28.7% had children under the age of 18 living in them. Of all households, 35.9% were married-couple households, 23.5% were households with a male householder and no spouse or partner present, and 30.7% were households with a female householder and no spouse or partner present. About 31.0% of all households were made up of individuals and 10.2% had someone living alone who was 65 years of age or older.

There were 1,945 housing units, of which 9.8% were vacant. The homeowner vacancy rate was 1.9% and the rental vacancy rate was 12.3%.

Racial composition as of the 2020 census
Race	Number	Percent
White	3,143	73.7%
Black or African American	399	9.4%
American Indian and Alaska Native	15	0.4%
Asian	142	3.3%
Native Hawaiian and Other Pacific Islander	1	0.0%
Some other race	185	4.3%
Two or more races	379	8.9%
Hispanic or Latino (of any race)	480	11.3%

=== 2010 census ===
The 2010 United States census counted 4,288 people, 1,755 households, and 1,095 families in the borough. The population density was 4,187.0 inhabitants per square mile (1,616.6/km^{2}). There were 1,912 housing units at an average density of 1,867.0 per square mile (720.9/km^{2}). The racial makeup was 89.53% (3,839) White, 4.90% (210) Black or African American, 0.16% (7) Native American, 1.49% (64) Asian, 0.05% (2) Pacific Islander, 2.31% (99) from other races, and 1.56% (67) from two or more races. Hispanic or Latino of any race were 6.02% (258) of the population.

Of the 1,755 households, 26.2% had children under the age of 18; 40.9% were married couples living together; 14.5% had a female householder with no husband present and 37.6% were non-families. Of all households, 31.3% were made up of individuals and 9.1% had someone living alone who was 65 years of age or older. The average household size was 2.44 and the average family size was 3.06.

20.4% of the population were under the age of 18, 10.1% from 18 to 24, 28.7% from 25 to 44, 29.1% from 45 to 64, and 11.6% who were 65 years of age or older. The median age was 38.8 years. For every 100 females, the population had 96.1 males. For every 100 females ages 18 and older there were 94.1 males.

The Census Bureau's 2006–2010 American Community Survey showed that (in 2010 inflation-adjusted dollars) median household income was $49,854 (with a margin of error of +/− $4,131) and the median family income was $65,089 (+/− $13,208). Males had a median income of $45,294 (+/− $5,957) versus $39,732 (+/− $7,921) for females. The per capita income for the borough was $26,908 (+/− $3,575). About 13.7% of families and 15.1% of the population were below the poverty line, including 22.7% of those under age 18 and 24.2% of those age 65 or over.

=== 2000 census ===
As of the 2000 census, there were 4,500 people, 1,812 households, and 1,125 families residing in the borough. The population density was 4,666.1 inhabitants per square mile (1,801.6/km^{2}). There were 1,938 housing units at an average density of 2,009.5 per square mile (775.9/km^{2}). The racial makeup of the borough was 93.47% White, 2.71% Black, 0.13% Native American, 1.00% Asian, 0.02% Pacific Islander, 1.29% from other races, and 1.38% from two or more races. Hispanic or Latino of any race were 2.96% of the population.

There were 1,812 households, out of which 29.5% had children under the age of 18 living with them, 45.4% were married couples living together, 12.2% had a female householder with no husband present, and 37.9% were non-families. 31.8% of all households were made up of individuals, and 11.9% had someone living alone who was 65 years of age or older. The average household size was 2.48 and the average family size was 3.15.

In the borough, the age distribution of the population shows 24.5% under the age of 18, 8.0% from 18 to 24, 32.0% from 25 to 44, 21.5% from 45 to 64, and 14.1% who were 65 years of age or older. The median age was 37 years. For every 100 females, there were 94.2 males. For every 100 females age 18 and over, there were 91.4 males.

The median income for a household in the borough was $39,570, and the median income for a family was $49,005. Males had a median income of $35,909 versus $27,220 for females. The per capita income for the borough was $18,747. About 7.4% of families and 8.7% of the population were below the poverty line, including 13.9% of those under age 18 and 5.9% of those age 65 or over.

== Government ==
=== Local government ===
Westville is governed under the borough form of New Jersey municipal government, which is used in 218 municipalities (of the 564) statewide, making it the most common form of government in New Jersey. The governing body is comprised of a mayor and a borough council, with all positions elected at-large on a partisan basis as part of the November general election. A mayor is elected directly by the voters to a four-year term of office. The borough council includes six members elected to serve three-year terms on a staggered basis, with two seats coming up for election each year in a three-year cycle. The borough form of government used by Westville is a "weak mayor / strong council" government in which council members act as the legislative body with the mayor presiding at meetings and voting only in the event of a tie. The mayor can veto ordinances subject to an override by a two-thirds majority vote of the council. The mayor makes committee and liaison assignments for council members, and most appointments are made by the mayor with the advice and consent of the council.

As of 2025, the mayor of Westville is Democrat Fritz H. Sims Jr., whose term of office ends December 31, 2026. Members of the Westville Borough Council are Council President Bruce Nordaby (D, 2027), Donna M. Domico (D, 2026), Travis R. Lawrence (D, 2025), Paul C. Mailley (D, 2025), Charles D. Murtaugh (D, 2026), Tracy Van Acker (D, 2025; appointed to serve an unexpired term) and Timothy Young (D, 2027).

In December 2024, Tracy Van Acker was appointed to fill the seat expiring in December 2025 that had been held by Matthew Gayle until he resigned from office.

In June 2020, Fritz H. Sims Jr. was appointed to fill the seat expiring in December 2022 that became vacant following the resignation of Russell W. Welsh Jr. after moving out of Westville.

=== Federal, state, and county representation ===
Westville is located in the 1st Congressional District and is part of New Jersey's 3rd state legislative district.

For the 119th United States Congress, New Jersey's 1st congressional district is represented by Donald Norcross (D, Camden). New Jersey is represented in the United States Senate by Democrats Cory Booker (Newark, term ends 2027) and Andy Kim (Moorestown, term ends 2031).

For the 2026–2027 session, the 3rd legislative district of the New Jersey Legislature is represented in the State Senate by John Burzichelli (D, Paulsboro) and in the General Assembly by David Bailey (D, Woodstown) and Heather Simmons (D, Glassboro).

Gloucester County is governed by a board of county commissioners, whose seven members are elected at-large to three-year terms of office on a staggered basis in partisan elections, with either two or three seats coming up for election each year. At a reorganization meeting held each January, the Board selects a Director and a Deputy Director from among its members. As of 2025, Gloucester County's Commissioners are:

Director Frank J. DiMarco (D, Deptford Township, 2025), Matt Weng (D, Pitman, 2026), Joann Gattinelli (D, Washington Township, 2026), Nicholas DeSilvio (R, Franklin Township, 2027), Denice DiCarlo (D, West Deptford Township, 2025) Deputy Director Jim Jefferson (D, Woodbury, 2026) and Christopher Konawel Jr. (R, Glassboro, 2027).

Gloucester County's constitutional officers are: Clerk James N. Hogan (D, Franklin Township; 2027), Sheriff Carmel Morina (D, Greenwich Township; 2027) and Surrogate Giuseppe "Joe" Chila (D, Woolwich Township; 2028).

=== Politics ===
United States presidential election results for Westville 2024 2020 2016 2012 2008 2004
Year	Republican		Democratic		Third party(ies)	
Year	No.	%	No.	%	No.	%
2024	976	49.12%	968	48.72%	43	2.16%
2020	1,011	48.35%	1,041	49.78%	39	1.87%
2016	856	50.06%	761	44.50%	93	5.44%
2012	685	40.48%	967	57.15%	40	2.36%
2008	770	39.43%	1,133	58.01%	50	2.56%
2004	812	43.31%	1,044	55.68%	19	1.01%

As of March 2011, there were a total of 2,636 registered voters in Westville, of which 898 (34.1%) were registered as Democrats, 481 (18.2%) were registered as Republicans and 1,256 (47.6%) were registered as Unaffiliated. There was one voter registered to another party.

In the 2012 presidential election, Democrat Barack Obama received 57.2% of the vote (967 cast), ahead of Republican Mitt Romney with 40.5% (685 votes), and other candidates with 2.4% (40 votes), among the 1,711 ballots cast by the borough's 2,715 registered voters (19 ballots were spoiled), for a turnout of 63.0%. In the 2008 presidential election, Democrat Barack Obama received 57.0% of the vote (1,133 cast), ahead of Republican John McCain with 38.8% (770 votes) and other candidates with 2.5% (50 votes), among the 1,987 ballots cast by the borough's 2,854 registered voters, for a turnout of 69.6%. In the 2004 presidential election, Democrat John Kerry received 55.5% of the vote (1,044 ballots cast), outpolling Republican George W. Bush with 43.1% (812 votes) and other candidates with 0.7% (19 votes), among the 1,882 ballots cast by the borough's 2,623 registered voters, for a turnout percentage of 71.7.

Gubernatorial election results for Westville
Year	Republican		Democratic		Third party(ies)	
Year	No.	%	No.	%	No.	%
2025	630	42.40%	842	56.66%	14	0.94%
2021	644	58.65%	447	40.71%	7	0.64%
2017	362	42.49%	455	53.40%	35	4.11%
2013	602	64.18%	304	32.41%	32	3.41%
2009	514	46.18%	473	42.50%	126	11.32%
2005	576	43.67%	669	50.72%	74	5.61%

In the 2013 gubernatorial election, Republican Chris Christie received 64.2% of the vote (602 cast), ahead of Democrat Barbara Buono with 32.4% (304 votes), and other candidates with 3.4% (32 votes), among the 961 ballots cast by the borough's 2,666 registered voters (23 ballots were spoiled), for a turnout of 36.0%. In the 2009 gubernatorial election, Republican Chris Christie received 45.0% of the vote (514 ballots cast), ahead of Democrat Jon Corzine with 41.5% (473 votes), Independent Chris Daggett with 10.2% (116 votes) and other candidates with 0.9% (10 votes), among the 1,141 ballots cast by the borough's 2,759 registered voters, yielding a 41.4% turnout.

United States Senate election results for Westville1
Year	Republican		Democratic		Third party(ies)	
Year	No.	%	No.	%	No.	%
2024	850	45.09%	987	52.36%	48	2.55%
2018	653	52.07%	550	43.86%	51	4.07%
2012	617	37.76%	950	58.14%	67	4.10%
2006	551	43.18%	679	53.21%	46	3.61%

United States Senate election results for Westville2
Year	Republican		Democratic		Third party(ies)	
Year	No.	%	No.	%	No.	%
2020	939	45.89%	1,064	52.00%	43	2.10%
2014	367	46.34%	414	52.27%	11	1.39%
2013	256	54.35%	205	43.52%	10	2.12%
2008	699	38.26%	1,071	58.62%	57	3.12%

== Education ==
The Westville School District is a community public school district that serves students in pre-kindergarten through sixth grade at Parkview Elementary School. As of the 2023–24 school year, the district, comprised of one school, had an enrollment of 367 students and 36.9 classroom teachers (on an FTE basis), for a student–teacher ratio of 10.0:1.

For seventh through twelfth grade, public school students attend Gateway Regional High School, a regional public high school that also serves students from the boroughs of National Park, Wenonah and Woodbury Heights, as part of the Gateway Regional High School District. As of the 2023–24 school year, the high school had an enrollment of 875 students and 82.2 classroom teachers (on an FTE basis), for a student–teacher ratio of 10.6:1.

Students from across the county are eligible to apply to attend Gloucester County Institute of Technology, a four-year high school in Deptford Township that provides technical and vocational education. As a public school, students do not pay tuition to attend the school.

== Transportation ==
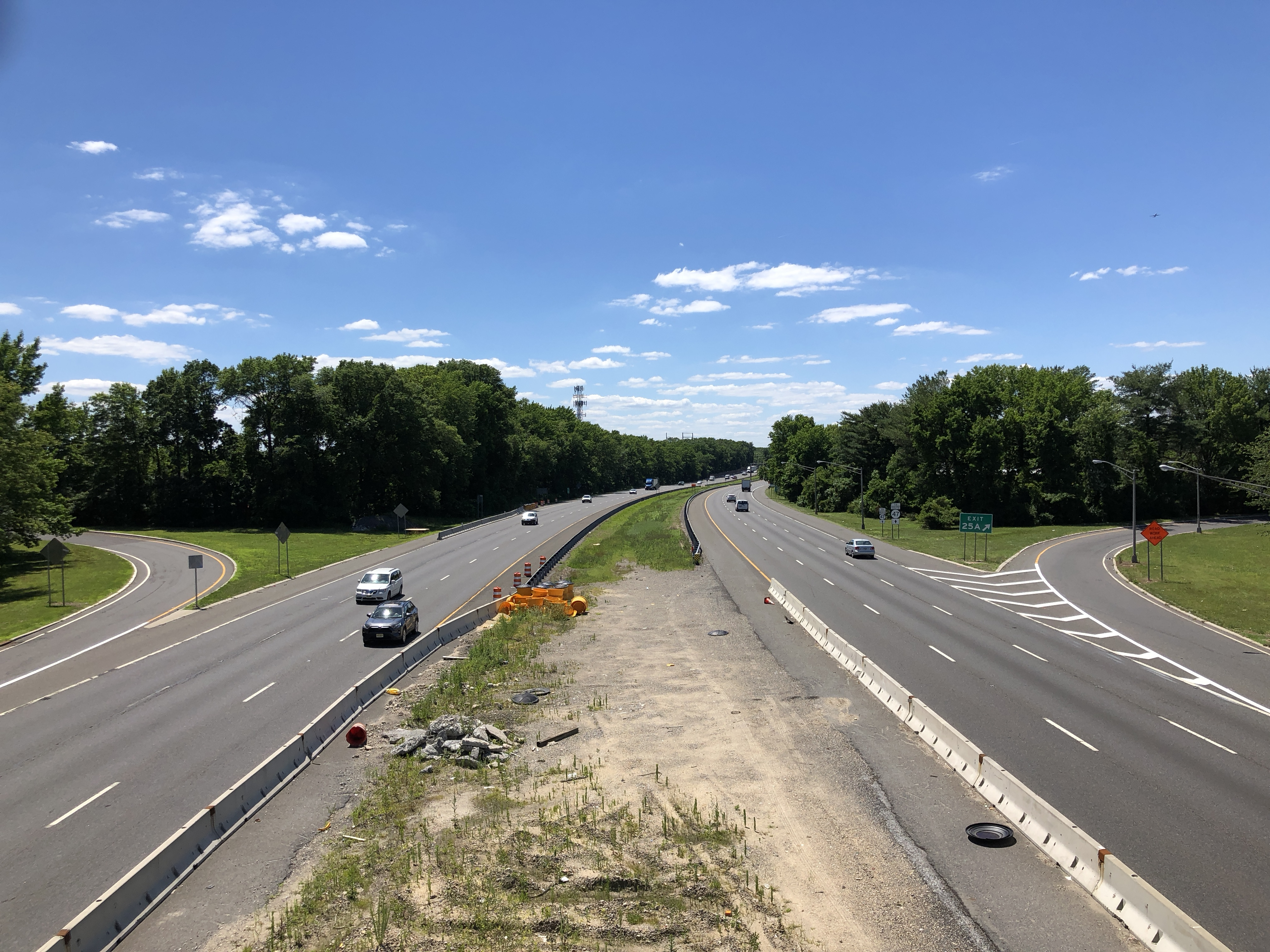
Interstate 295 southbound in Westville

=== Roads and highways ===
As of May 2010, the borough had a total of 18.05 miles (29.05 km) of roadways, of which 12.72 miles (20.47 km) were maintained by the municipality, 1.66 miles (2.67 km) by Gloucester County and 3.67 miles (5.91 km) by the New Jersey Department of Transportation.

County Route 551, Route 45, Route 47, U.S. Route 130, and Interstate 295 are the major roads that pass through the borough.

=== Public transportation ===
NJ Transit bus service on the 401 route between Salem and Philadelphia, the 402 between Pennsville Township and Philadelphia, the 408 between Millville and Philadelphia, the 410 between Bridgeton and Philadelphia, the 412 route between Sewell and Philadelphia, the 455 between Cherry Hill Mall and Paulsboro, and the 463 route between Woodbury and the Avandale Park-and-Ride in Sicklerville.

Conrail's Vineland Secondary freight rail line passes through the town. Formerly, the Pennsylvania - Reading Seashore Lines ran passenger trains until February 5, 1971.

== Notable people ==
Notable past and present residents of Westville include:

- George Anastasia (born 1947), expert on the American Mafia, author and journalist with The Philadelphia Inquirer
- Stephen Decatur (1779–1820), U.S. Navy officer recognized for heroism in the First Barbary War and the Second Barbary War and in the War of 1812
- Malcolm Fox (1906–1968), former professional race car driver
- Harold W. Hannold (1911–1995), politician who served in the New Jersey Senate from 1945 to 1959 and as Senate President in 1952
- James Hunter III (1916–1989), former United States Court of Appeals for the Third Circuit judge
- Maria Pallante (born 1964), United States Register of Copyrights
- Antwine Perez (born 1988), college football player
- Milt Plum (born 1935), professional football player with the Cleveland Browns (1957–1961), Detroit Lions (1962–1967), Los Angeles Rams (1968), and New York Giants (1969)
- Larry Sharpe (1951–2017), former professional wrestler

Preceded by Brooklawn; Camden County	Bordering communities of Philadelphia	Succeeded by West Deptford Township
