= Rasheer Fleming =

American basketball player (born 2004)

No. 20 – Phoenix Suns
- Position: Power forward
- League: NBA

Personal information
- Born: July 10, 2004 (age 22) Camden, New Jersey, U.S.
- Listed height: 6 ft 9 in (2.06 m)
- Listed weight: 240 lb (109 kg)

Career information
- High school: Gloucester City (Gloucester City, New Jersey); Camden (Camden, New Jersey)
- College: Saint Joseph's (2022–2025)
- NBA draft: 2025: 2nd round, 31st overall pick
- Drafted by: Minnesota Timberwolves
- Playing career: 2025–present

Career history
- 2025–present: Phoenix Suns
- 2025: →Valley Suns

Career highlights
- First-team All-Atlantic 10 (2025)
- Stats at NBA.com
- Stats at Basketball Reference

Rasheer TyLee Fleming (born July 10, 2004) is an American professional basketball player for the Phoenix Suns of the National Basketball Association (NBA). He played college basketball for the Saint Joseph's Hawks. He was drafted by the Minnesota Timberwolves in the second round of the 2025 NBA draft and subsequently traded to the Suns.

== High school career ==
Fleming attended Gloucester City High School in Gloucester City, New Jersey for his freshman and sophomore years of high school before transferring to Camden High School in Camden, New Jersey. He grew three inches between his sophomore and junior years. Fleming committed to playing college basketball for Saint Joseph's over offers from Albany, Siena, and Towson.

== College career ==
Fleming averaged 5.8 points and five rebounds per game during his freshman season with the Saint Joseph's Hawks in 2022–23. He became the Hawks' starting power forward midway through his freshman year. Fleming finished his sophomore season averaging 10.7 points per game. During his junior season, he scored 19 points in a win over rival Villanova.

He was named First Team All-Atlantic 10 after averaging 14.7 points, 8.5 rebounds and 1.5 blocks per game. In April 2025, Fleming declared for the 2025 NBA draft.

== Professional career ==
Fleming was selected by the Minnesota Timberwolves with the 31st overall pick in the 2025 NBA draft and subsequently traded to the Phoenix Suns on July 6 in a seven-team trade. On December 4, he was assigned to the Suns' G League affiliate, the Valley Suns. Fleming was recalled to Phoenix on December 12.

== Career statistics ==
Legend
GP	Games played	GS	Games started	MPG	Minutes per game
FG%	Field goal percentage	3P%	3-point field goal percentage	FT%	Free throw percentage
RPG	Rebounds per game	APG	Assists per game	SPG	Steals per game
BPG	Blocks per game	PPG	Points per game	**Bold**	Career high

=== NBA ===
==== Regular season ====
Year	Team	GP	GS	MPG	FG%	3P%	FT%	RPG	APG	SPG	BPG	PPG
2025–26	Phoenix	55	1	12.2	.405	.346	.559	2.3	.3	.4	.4	4.3
Career		55	1	12.2	.405	.346	.559	2.3	.3	.4	.4	4.3

==== Playoffs ====
Year	Team	GP	GS	MPG	FG%	3P%	FT%	RPG	APG	SPG	BPG	PPG
2026	Phoenix	4	0	4.5	.600	.600	–	.3	.0	.5	.3	2.3
Career		4	0	4.5	.600	.600	–	.3	.0	.5	.3	2.3

=== College ===
Year	Team	GP	GS	MPG	FG%	3P%	FT%	RPG	APG	SPG	BPG	PPG
2022–23	Saint Joseph's	31	18	20.5	.427	.297	.690	5.0	.6	.8	.9	5.8
2023–24	Saint Joseph's	**35**	**35**	26.8	.528	.324	.612	7.4	.8	.8	**1.5**	10.7
2024–25	Saint Joseph's	**35**	**35**	**31.3**	**.531**	**.390**	**.743**	**8.5**	**1.3**	**1.4**	**1.5**	**14.7**
Career		101	88	26.4	.510	.349	.680	7.1	.9	1.0	1.3	10.6
