= Gloucester City Public Schools =

School district in Camden County, New Jersey, US

Address
- 520 Cumberland Street Gloucester City, Camden County, New Jersey, 08030; United States
- Coordinates: 39.895328°N 75.121701°W

District information
- Grades: PreK-12
- Superintendent: Sean Gorman
- Business administrator: Sarah Bell
- Schools: 3
- Affiliation: Former Abbott district

Students and staff
- Enrollment: 2,356 (as of 2022–23)
- Faculty: 176.8 (on an FTE basis)
- Student–teacher ratio: 13.3:1

Other information
- District Factor Group: B
- Website: www.gcsd.k12.nj.us
Ind.	Per pupil	District spending	Rank (*)	K-12 average	%± vs. average
1A	Total Spending	$23,176	65	$18,891	22.7%
1	Budgetary Cost	19,035	66	14,783	28.8%
2	Classroom Instruction	10,920	66	8,763	24.6%
6	Support Services	3,532	65	2,392	47.7%
8	Administrative Cost	1,701	53	1,485	14.5%
10	Operations & Maintenance	2,421	66	1,783	35.8%
13	Extracurricular Activities	429	45	268	60.1%
16	Median Teacher Salary	61,100	23	64,043
Data from NJDoE 2014 Taxpayers' Guide to Education Spending. *Of K-12 districts with 1,800-3,500 students. Lowest spending=1; Highest=68

Gloucester City Public Schools is a comprehensive community public school district that serves students in pre-kindergarten through twelfth grade from Gloucester City, in Camden County, in the U.S. state of New Jersey. The district is one of 31 former Abbott districts statewide that were established pursuant to the decision by the New Jersey Supreme Court in Abbott v. Burke which are now referred to as "SDA Districts" based on the requirement for the state to cover all costs for school building and renovation projects in these districts under the supervision of the New Jersey Schools Development Authority.

As of the 2022–23 school year, the district, comprised of three schools, had an enrollment of 2,356 students and 176.8 classroom teachers (on an FTE basis), for a student–teacher ratio of 13.3:1.

The district is classified by the New Jersey Department of Education as being in District Factor Group "B", the second lowest of eight groupings. District Factor Groups organize districts statewide to allow comparison by common socioeconomic characteristics of the local districts. From lowest socioeconomic status to highest, the categories are A, B, CD, DE, FG, GH, I and J.

Students from Brooklawn attend the district's high school for ninth through twelfth grades as part of a sending/receiving relationship with the Brooklawn Public School District.

== Schools ==
Schools in the district (with 2022–23 enrollment data from the National Center for Education Statistics) are:

Elementary school

- Cold Springs Elementary School with 842 students in grades PreK-3
  - Jennifer Daubert, principal

Middle school

- Gloucester City Middle School with 779 students in grades 4-8
  - Shane McNichol, principal

High school

- Gloucester City High School with 702 students in grades 9-12
  - Sean Gorman, principal

== Administration ==
Core members of the district's administration are:

- Sean Gorman, superintendent
- Sarah Bell, business administrator and board secretary

== Board of education ==
The district's board of education, comprised of nine members, sets policy and oversees the fiscal and educational operation of the district through its administration. As a Type II school district, the board's trustees are elected directly by voters to serve three-year terms of office on a staggered basis, with three seats up for election each year held (since 2012) as part of the November general election. The board appoints a superintendent to oversee the district's day-to-day operations and a business administrator to supervise the business functions of the district. The board includes a tenth member appointed to represent Brooklawn.
