= Brooklawn, New Jersey =

Borough in Camden County, New Jersey, US

- Borough
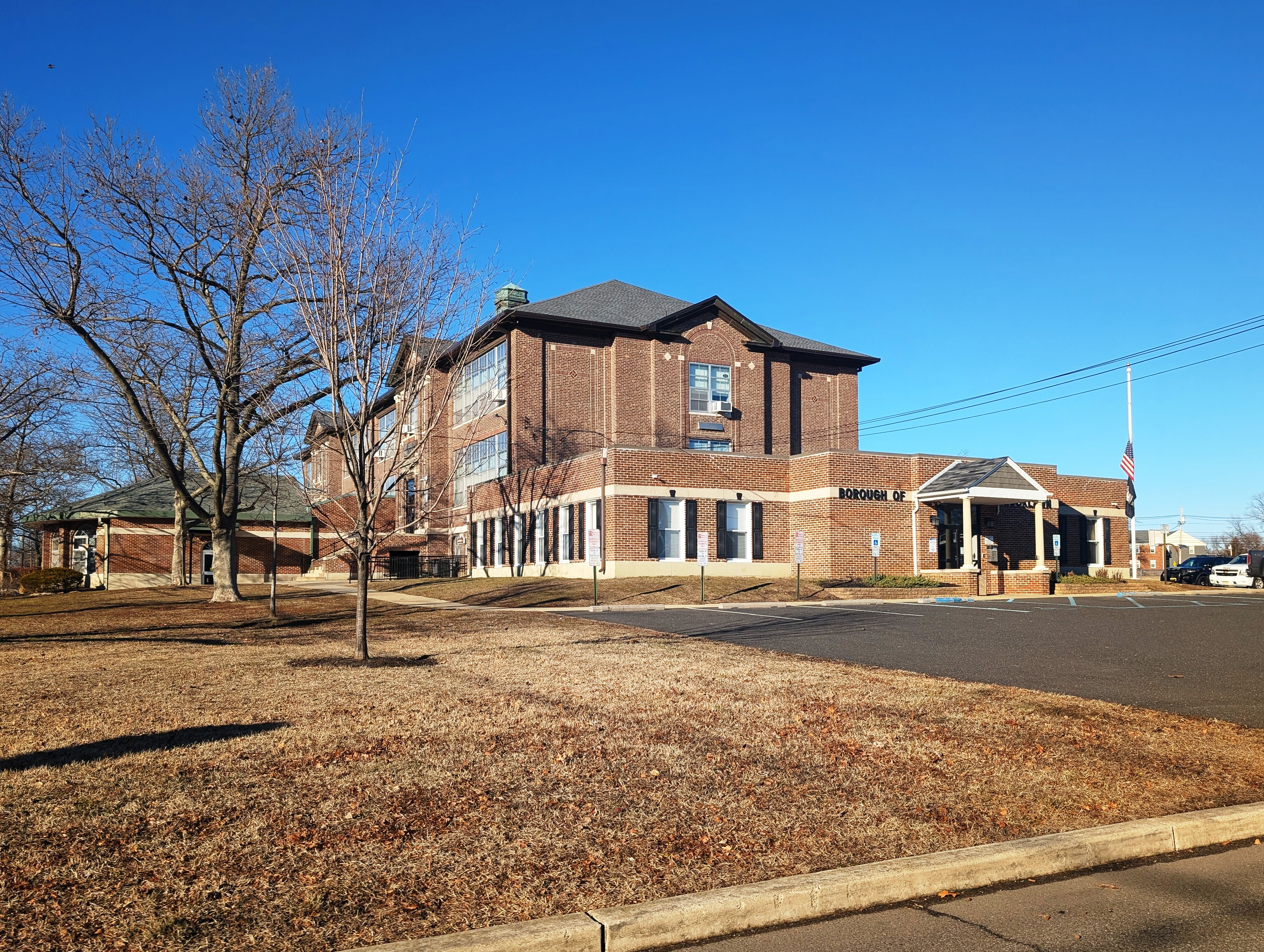
- Alice Costello School and borough hall

- logo

- Location of Brooklawn in Camden County highlighted in red (right). Inset map: Location of Camden County in New Jersey highlighted in orange (left).

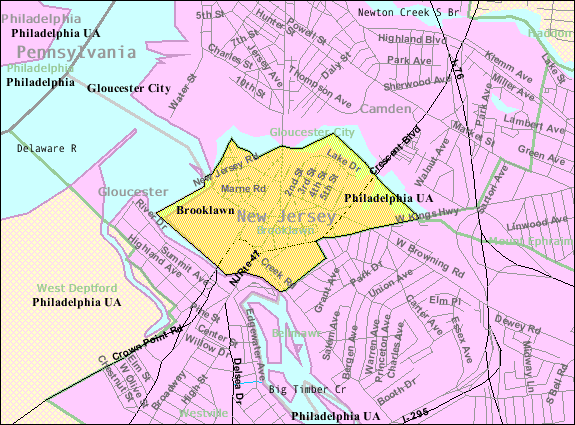
- Census Bureau map of Brooklawn, New Jersey

- Location in Camden County Location in New Jersey Location in the United States
- Coordinates: 39.87935°N 75.120396°W
- Country: United States
- State: New Jersey
- County: Camden
- Incorporated: March 11, 1924; 102 years ago

Government
  - Type: Borough
  - Body: Borough Council
  - Mayor: Jerry Granstrom (D, unexpired term ending December 31, 2026)
  - Municipal clerk: Ryan Giles

Area
  - Total: 0.53 sq mi (1.37 km^{2})
  - Land: 0.49 sq mi (1.27 km^{2})
  - Water: 0.042 sq mi (0.11 km^{2}) 7.74%
  - Rank: 546th of 565 in state 32nd of 37 in county
- Elevation: 20 ft (6.1 m)

Population (2020)
  - Total: 1,815
  - Estimate (2023): 1,813
  - Rank: 493rd of 565 in state 32nd of 37 in county
  - Density: 3,715.7/sq mi (1,434.6/km^{2})
  - Rank: 179th of 565 in state 22nd of 37 in county
- Time zone: UTC−05:00 (Eastern (EST))
  - Summer (DST): UTC−04:00 (Eastern (EDT))
- ZIP Code: 08030
- Area code: 856 exchanges: 456, 742, 931, 933
- FIPS code: 3400708170
- GNIS feature ID: 0885172
- Website: brooklawn-nj.com

Brooklawn is a borough in Camden County, in the U.S. state of New Jersey. As of the 2020 United States census, the borough's population was 1,815, a decrease of 140 (−7.2%) from the 2010 census count of 1,955, which in turn reflected a decline of 399 (-16.9%) from the 2,354 counted in the 2000 census.

Brooklawn was incorporated as a borough on March 11, 1924, from portions of the now-defunct Centre Township, based on the results of a referendum held on April 5, 1924. The borough was reincorporated on March 23, 1926. The borough's name is derived from its location and setting.

== Geography ==
According to the U.S. Census Bureau, the borough had a total area of 0.53 square miles (1.37 km^{2}), including 0.49 square miles (1.27 km^{2}) of land and 0.04 square miles (0.11 km^{2}) of water (7.74%).

The borough borders the municipalities of Bellmawr, Gloucester City, and Mount Ephraim in Camden County and Westville in Gloucester County.

== Demographics ==
Historical population
Census	Pop.	Note	%±
1930	1,753		—
1940	1,919		9.5%
1950	2,262		17.9%
1960	2,504		10.7%
1970	2,870		14.6%
1980	2,133		−25.7%
1990	1,805		−15.4%
2000	2,354		30.4%
2010	1,955		−16.9%
2020	1,815		−7.2%
2023 (est.)	1,813	▼	−0.1%
Population sources: 1930–2000; 1930 1940–2000; 2000 2010 2020

=== 2010 census ===
The 2010 United States census counted 1,955 people, 759 households, and 516 families in the borough. The population density was 3,974.6 per square mile (1,534.6/km^{2}). There were 806 housing units at an average density of 1,638.6 per square mile (632.7/km^{2}). The racial makeup was 87.88% (1,718) White, 5.32% (104) Black or African American, 0.10% (2) Native American, 2.20% (43) Asian, 0.00% (0) Pacific Islander, 2.05% (40) from other races, and 2.46% (48) from two or more races. Hispanic or Latino of any race were 6.29% (123) of the population.

Of the 759 households, 30.8% had children under the age of 18; 43.0% were married couples living together; 18.3% had a female householder with no husband present and 32.0% were non-families. Of all households, 24.8% were made up of individuals and 8.2% had someone living alone who was 65 years of age or older. The average household size was 2.58 and the average family size was 3.08.

23.4% of the population were under the age of 18, 8.9% from 18 to 24, 29.8% from 25 to 44, 26.7% from 45 to 64, and 11.2% who were 65 years of age or older. The median age was 36.9 years. For every 100 females, the population had 93.8 males. For every 100 females ages 18 and older there were 89.6 males.

The Census Bureau's 2006–2010 American Community Survey showed that (in 2010 inflation-adjusted dollars) median household income was $58,488 (with a margin of error of +/− $4,776) and the median family income was $62,390 (+/− $8,247). Males had a median income of $44,612 (+/− $6,912) versus $32,092 (+/− $20,049) for females. The per capita income for the borough was $26,154 (+/− $2,724). No families and 2.0% of the population were below the poverty line, including none of those under age 18 and 3.9% of those age 65 or over.

=== 2000 census ===
As of the 2000 U.S. census, there were 2,354 people, 961 households, and 600 families residing in the borough. The population density was 5,003.4 inhabitants per square mile (1,931.8/km^{2}). There were 1,025 housing units at an average density of 2,178.6 per square mile (841.2/km^{2}). The racial makeup of the borough was 90.27% White, 4.29% African American, 0.08% Native American, 1.06% Asian, 2.38% from other races, and 1.91% from two or more races. Hispanic or Latino of any race were 4.72% of the population.

There were 961 households, out of which 32.8% had children under the age of 18 living with them, 41.8% were married couples living together, 16.4% had a female householder with no husband present, and 37.5% were non-families. 30.9% of all households were made up of individuals, and 12.7% had someone living alone who was 65 years of age or older. The average household size was 2.45 and the average family size was 3.09.

In the borough, the population was spread out, with 25.8% under the age of 18, 8.8% from 18 to 24, 32.3% from 25 to 44, 19.9% from 45 to 64, and 13.2% who were 65 years of age or older. The median age was 35 years. For every 100 females, there were 89.1 males. For every 100 females age 18 and over, there were 84.0 males.

The median income for a household in the borough was $39,600, and the median income for a family was $47,891. Males had a median income of $36,190 versus $26,591 for females. The per capita income for the borough was $18,295. About 6.1% of families and 7.3% of the population were below the poverty line, including 12.3% of those under age 18 and 4.0% of those age 65 or over.

== Government ==
=== Local representation ===
Brooklawn is governed under the borough form of New Jersey municipal government, which is used in 218 municipalities (of the 564) statewide, making it the most common form of government in New Jersey. The governing body is comprised of a mayor and a borough council, with all positions elected at-large on a partisan basis as part of the November general election. A mayor is elected directly by the voters to a four-year term of office. The borough council includes six members elected to serve three-year terms on a staggered basis, with two seats coming up for election each year in a three-year cycle. The borough form of government used by Bellmawr is a "weak mayor / strong council" government in which council members act as the legislative body with the mayor presiding at meetings and voting only in the event of a tie. The mayor can veto ordinances subject to an override by a two-thirds majority vote of the council. The mayor makes committee and liaison assignments for council members, and most appointments are made by the mayor with the advice and consent of the council.

As of 2026, the mayor of the Borough of Brooklawn is Democrat Jerry "Skip" Granstrom, who was elected to serve a term of office ending December 31, 2026. Members of the Brooklawn Borough Council are Council President Colin MacAdams (D, 2026), John Clotworthy (D, 2028), Bruce Darrow (D, 2026), Jeffrey M. Haller (D, 2028), Patricia McConnell (D, 2027) and Stacey Ostrom (D, 2027).

In March 2024, councilmember Jerry Granstrom was chosen to serve as mayor, filling the vacant seat expiring December 2026 that had been held by Julie McCleary. The next month, Bruce Darrow was appointed to fill the term expiring in December 2025 that had been held by Patrick Moses until he resigned from office. Christina Houchins was appointed to fill the council seat expiring in December 2026 that became vacant when Jerry Granstrom took office as mayor. Granstrom, Darrow and Houchins served on an interim basis until the November 2024 general election, when voters will select candidates to serve the balance of all three terms.

In January 2023, the borough council selected Stacey Ostrom from a list of three candidates nominated by the Democratic municipal committee to fill the seat expiring in December 2024 that had been held by Julie McCleary until she stepped down from her seat on the council to take office as mayor.

In September 2012, Patrick MacAdams was selected by the borough council from among a list of three prospective candidates nominated by the Democratic municipal committee to fill the unexpired seat of Rickie Boulden, who had resigned from office in June 2012.

=== Federal, state and county representation ===
Brooklawn is located in the 1st Congressional District and is part of New Jersey's 5th state legislative district.

For the 119th United States Congress, New Jersey's 1st congressional district is represented by Donald Norcross (D, Camden). New Jersey is represented in the United States Senate by Democrats Cory Booker (Newark, term ends 2027) and Andy Kim (Moorestown, term ends 2031).

For the 2026–2027 session, the 5th legislative district of the New Jersey Legislature is represented in the State Senate by Nilsa Cruz-Perez (D, Barrington) and in the General Assembly by Bill Moen (D, Camden) and William Spearman (D, Camden).

Camden County is governed by a Board of County Commissioners composed of seven members chosen at-large in partisan elections for three-year terms on a staggered basis by the residents of the county, with either two or three seats up for election each year as part of the November general election. At a reorganization meeting held in January after each election, the newly constituted Board of Commissioners selects one member to serve as Director and another as Deputy Director, each serving a one-year term in that role. As of 2025, Camden County's Commissioners are: Commissioner Director Louis Cappelli Jr. (D, Collingswood, 2026), Commissioner Deputy Director Edward T. McDonnell (D, Pennsauken Township, 2025), Virginia Ruiz Betteridge (D, Runnemede, 2025), Almar Dyer (D, Pennsauken Township, 2027), Melinda Kane (D, Cherry Hill, 2027), Jeffrey L. Nash (D, Winslow Township, 2027), and Jonathan L. Young Sr. (D, Berlin Township, 2026).

Camden County's constitutional officers are: Clerk Pamela Rosen Lampitt (D, Cherry Hill, 2029) Sheriff Chuck Billingham (D, Gloucester City, 2027) and Surrogate Michelle Gentek-Mayer (D, Gloucester Township, 2025).

=== Politics ===
As of March 2011, there were a total of 1,203 registered voters in Brooklawn, of which 512 (42.6% vs. 31.7% countywide) were registered as Democrats, 158 (13.1% vs. 21.1%) were registered as Republicans and 532 (44.2% vs. 47.1%) were registered as Unaffiliated. There was one voter registered to another party. Among the borough's 2010 Census population, 61.5% (vs. 57.1% in Camden County) were registered to vote, including 80.3% of those ages 18 and over (vs. 73.7% countywide).

United States presidential election results for Brooklawn
Year	Republican		Democratic		Third party(ies)	
Year	No.	%	No.	%	No.	%
2024	384	43.69%	485	55.18%	10	1.14%
2020	349	39.48%	517	58.48%	18	2.04%
2016	314	39.90%	437	55.53%	36	4.57%
2012	266	32.56%	542	66.34%	9	1.10%
2008	329	38.03%	522	60.35%	14	1.62%
2004	330	36.50%	562	62.17%	12	1.33%

In the 2012 presidential election, Democrat Barack Obama received 542 votes (65.9% vs. 54.8% countywide), ahead of Republican Mitt Romney with 266 votes (32.3% vs. 43.5%) and other candidates with 9 votes (1.1% vs. 0.9%), among the 823 ballots cast by the borough's 1,326 registered voters, for a turnout of 62.1% (vs. 70.4% in Camden County). In the 2008 presidential election, Democrat Barack Obama received 522 votes (59.1% vs. 66.2% countywide), ahead of Republican John McCain with 329 votes (37.3% vs. 30.7%) and other candidates with 14 votes (1.6% vs. 1.1%), among the 883 ballots cast by the borough's 1,249 registered voters, for a turnout of 70.7% (vs. 71.4% in Camden County). In the 2004 presidential election, Democrat John Kerry received 562 votes (61.5% vs. 61.7% countywide), ahead of Republican George W. Bush with 330 votes (36.1% vs. 36.4%) and other candidates with 12 votes (1.3% vs. 0.8%), among the 914 ballots cast by the borough's 1,211 registered voters, for a turnout of 75.5% (vs. 71.3% in the whole county).

Gubernatorial election results for Brooklawn
Year	Republican		Democratic		Third party(ies)	
Year	No.	%	No.	%	No.	%
2025	264	38.94%	407	60.03%	7	1.03%
2021	225	46.88%	248	51.67%	7	1.46%
2017	141	35.43%	248	62.31%	9	2.26%
2013	263	57.42%	183	39.96%	12	2.62%
2009	221	43.08%	242	47.17%	50	9.75%
2005	154	28.89%	348	65.29%	31	5.82%

In the 2013 gubernatorial election, Republican Chris Christie received 57.4% of the vote (263 cast), ahead of Democrat Barbara Buono with 40.0% (183 votes), and other candidates with 2.6% (12 votes), among the 472 ballots cast by the borough's 1,334 registered voters (14 ballots were spoiled), for a turnout of 35.4%. In the 2009 gubernatorial election, Democrat Jon Corzine received 242 ballots cast (46.4% vs. 53.8% countywide), ahead of Republican Chris Christie with 221 votes (42.3% vs. 38.5%), Independent Chris Daggett with 35 votes (6.7% vs. 4.5%) and other candidates with 15 votes (2.9% vs. 1.1%), among the 522 ballots cast by the borough's 1,213 registered voters, yielding a 43.0% turnout (vs. 40.8% in the county).

United States Senate election results for Brooklawn1
Year	Republican		Democratic		Third party(ies)	
Year	No.	%	No.	%	No.	%
2024	339	40.50%	487	58.18%	11	1.31%
2018	272	43.94%	293	47.33%	54	8.72%
2012	239	31.08%	513	66.71%	17	2.21%
2006	150	31.85%	300	63.69%	21	4.46%

United States Senate election results for Brooklawn2
Year	Republican		Democratic		Third party(ies)	
Year	No.	%	No.	%	No.	%
2020	346	39.59%	512	58.58%	16	1.83%
2014	155	32.77%	307	64.90%	11	2.33%
2013	96	39.83%	142	58.92%	3	1.24%
2008	267	33.25%	521	64.88%	15	1.87%

== Education ==
Brooklawn Public School District serves public school students in pre-kindergarten through eighth grade at Alice Costello School. As of the 2020–21 school year, the district, comprised of one school, had an enrollment of 286 students and 29.4 classroom teachers (on an FTE basis), for a student–teacher ratio of 9.7:1.

For ninth through twelfth grades, public school students attend Gloucester City High School in Gloucester City as part of a sending/receiving relationship with the Gloucester City Public Schools. As of the 2020–21 school year, the high school had an enrollment of 587 students and 46.5 classroom teachers (on an FTE basis), for a student–teacher ratio of 12.6:1.

Students from Brooklawn, and from all of Camden County, are eligible to attend the Camden County Technical Schools, a countywide public school district that serves the vocational and technical education needs of students at the high school and post-secondary level at the Gloucester Township Campus in the Sicklerville section of Gloucester Township or the Pennsauken Camps in Pennsauken Township. Students are accepted based on district admission standards and costs of attendance and transportation are covered by the home district of each student.

== Transportation ==
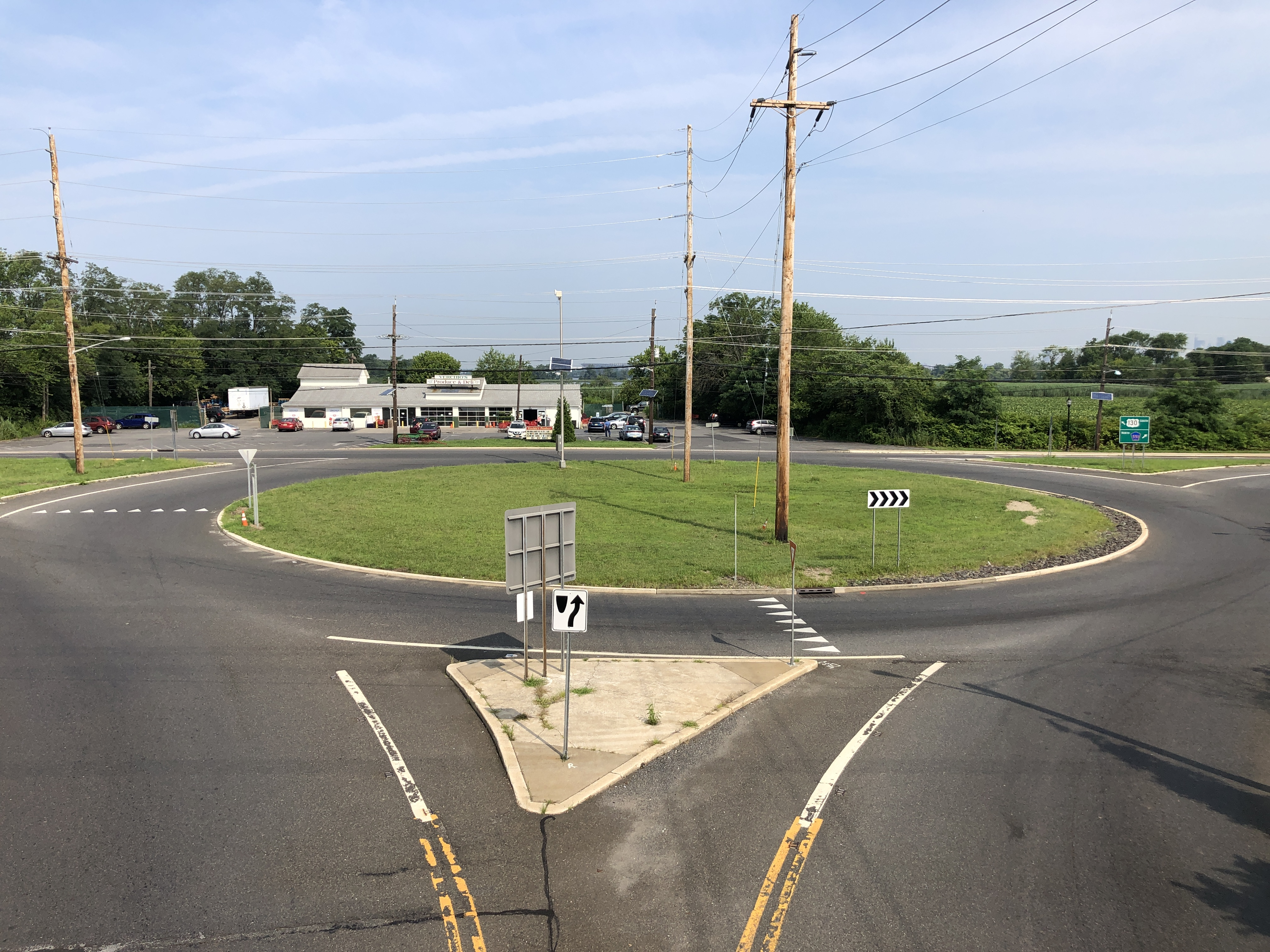
The junction of U.S. Route 130 and County Route 551 in Brooklawn

=== Roads and highways ===
As of May 2010, the borough had a total of 8.19 miles (13.18 km) of roadways, of which 5.78 miles (9.30 km) were maintained by the municipality, 1.13 miles (1.82 km) by Camden County and 1.28 miles (2.06 km) by the New Jersey Department of Transportation.

U.S. Route 130 is the main highway serving Brooklawn. Additionally, Route 47 reaches its northern terminus in the borough. County Route 551 is the main county road serving Brooklawn.

=== Public transportation ===
NJ Transit bus service is available between the borough and Philadelphia on routes 401 (from Salem), 402 (from Pennsville Township), 408 (from Millville), 410 (from Bridgeton), and 412 (from Sewell).

== Public safety ==
Brooklawn is protected by its own police force of approximately eight sworn police officers. Brooklawn also has its own fire company that serves the community with approximately six certified firefighters and eight junior firefighters. The fire company operates two Class A pumpers, a brush truck, a mobile cascade system, a special operations trailer, three boats, two antique fire engines (one of which is non-operational), and a command vehicle. Also housed in the borough-owned buildings are two canteen units used to deliver food to fire scenes that belong to the Camden County Fireman's Association. The fire company operates out of three buildings, of which two are located on the east side of town and one on the west side Brooklawn. The borough has entered a shared service agreement with the Borough of Bellmawr to provide ambulance service for Brooklawn, after shutting down the borough's volunteer ambulance due to lack of attendance on calls.

Preceded by Gloucester City	Bordering communities of Philadelphia	Succeeded by Westville; Gloucester County
