= Alfred Ford Skinner =

American politician (1862-1931)

Personal details
- Born: September 24, 1862 Newark, New Jersey
- Died: February 5, 1931 (aged 68)
- Party: Republican
- Education: Rutgers College; Columbia Law School
- Occupation: Lawyer, judge

Alfred Ford Skinner (September 24, 1862 – February 5, 1931) was a politician from the U.S. state of New Jersey.

== Personal life ==
Born in Newark, he was the son of Daniel M. and Mary C. (Squier) Skinner. He married Josephine Phillips in 1894. His children included Alfred Phillips (b. 1895), John Morris (b. 1897), Mary Eleanor (b. 1900), and Morris Phillips (b. 1904).

== Early years ==
Skinner’s early education was acquired in private schools in Newark. He entered Rutgers College in 1880, graduating in 1883. After leaving Rutgers, he took up a course in the Columbia Law School. He studied law in the office of John W. Taylor.

== Career ==
Skinner was admitted as an attorney in 1886 and became a counselor in 1891. He afterwards acted as clerk for eight months under Edward M. Colie, and later served as Managing Clerk for Whitehead & Condit. He then formed a partnership with Jay Ten Eyck which was dissolved when he went upon the Bench. Skinner was elected to the New Jersey General Assembly in 1893 and was re-elected in 1895. The enactment of the New Jersey Borough Law, which bearing his name, was of his devising, was one of the features of his work in Trenton. Two years later, he was made the Republican candidate for Register of Deeds for Essex County and elected. While serving in that capacity, Governor Foster McGowan Voorhees, in 1900, tendered him the appointment of Presiding Judge of the Essex County Courts, and he resigned his county office to accept the judicial one. He sat on the Bench until 1906, when he resigned to become a partner in the firm of Pitney, Hardin & Skinner in Newark. Skinner was a Trustee of Rutgers College, as well as a member of the Essex Club of Newark, the Madison Field Club and the Lawyers Club of Newark. He served as president of the Essex County Bar Association and the New Jersey State Bar Association.
