= Gloucester City High School =

High school in Camden County, New Jersey, US

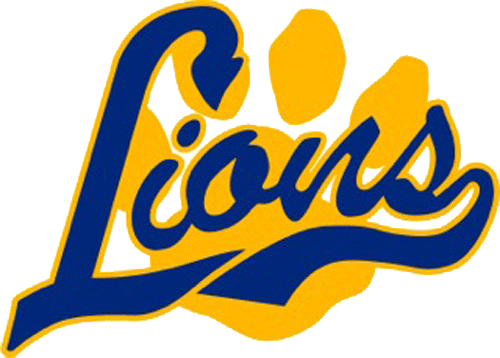

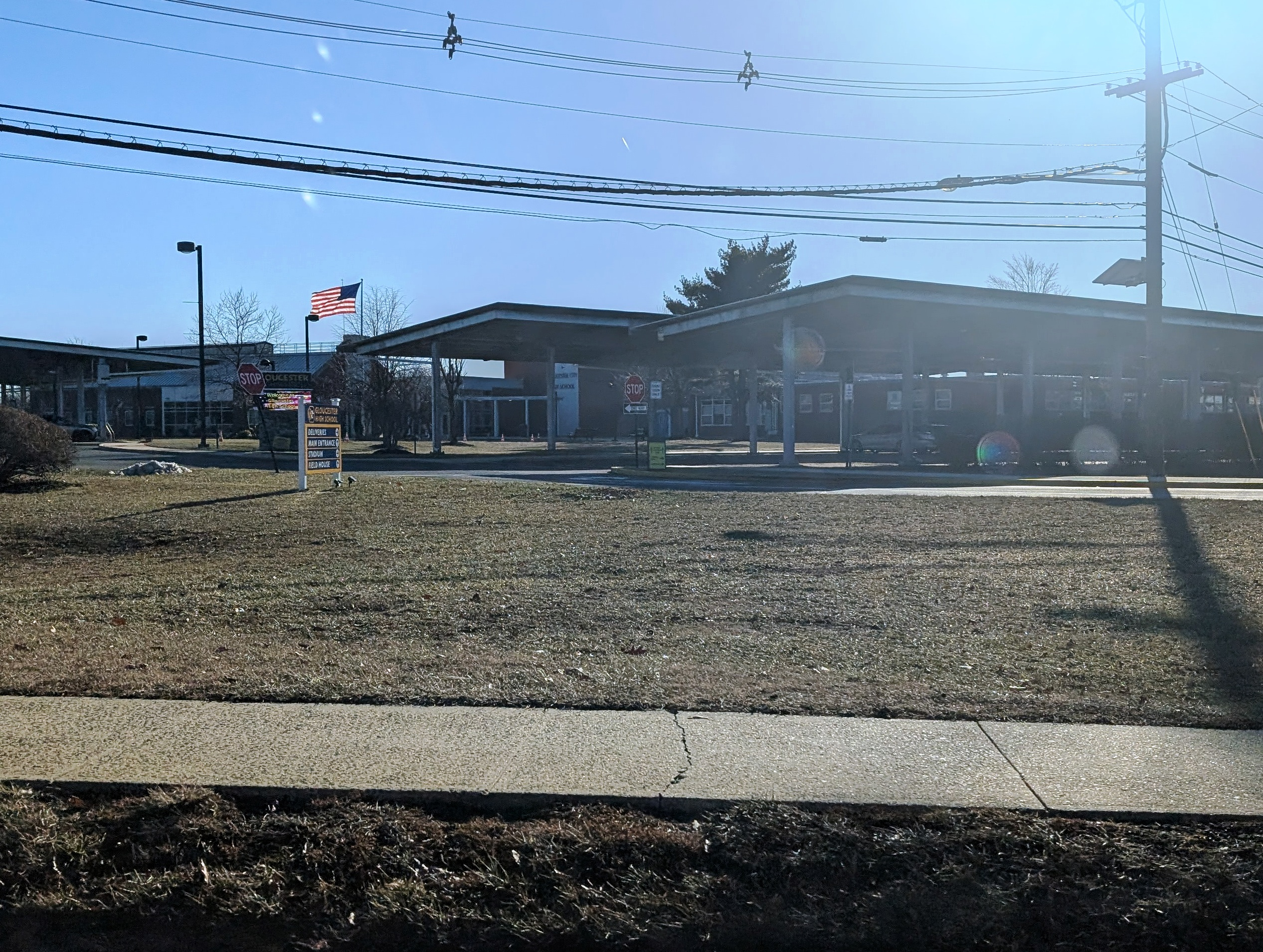

Location
- 1300 Market Street; Gloucester City, Camden County, New Jersey 08030; United States; 39.887342°N 75.111282°W

Information
- Type: public high school
- NCES School ID: 340600001494
- Principal: Sean Gorman
- Faculty: 50.0 FTEs
- Grades: 9-12
- Enrollment: 739 (as of 2024–25)
- Student to teacher ratio: 14.8:1
- Colors: Navy blue and gold
- Athletics conference: Colonial Conference (general); West Jersey Football League (football)
- Team name: Lions
- Website: ghs.gcsd.k12.nj.us

Gloucester City High School is a comprehensive four-year community public high school that is based in Gloucester City, in Camden County, in the U.S. state of New Jersey. The school serves students from ninth through twelfth grade as the lone secondary school of the Gloucester City Public Schools, one of 31 former Abbott districts statewide that were established pursuant to the decision by the New Jersey Supreme Court in Abbott v. Burke which are now referred to as "SDA Districts" based on the requirement for the state to cover all costs for school building and renovation projects in these districts under the supervision of the New Jersey Schools Development Authority.

As of the 2024–25 school year, the school had an enrollment of 739 students and 50.0 classroom teachers (on an FTE basis), for a student–teacher ratio of 14.8:1. There were 378 students (51.2% of enrollment) eligible for free lunch and 38 (5.1% of students) eligible for reduced-cost lunch.

Students from Brooklawn attend the high school for grades 9-12 as part of a sending/receiving relationship.

== History ==
A new high school facility, completed at a cost of almost $2 million (equivalent to $21.5 million in 2025) was opened to students in February 1961.

== Awards, recognition and rankings ==
The school was the 270th-ranked public high school in New Jersey out of 339 schools statewide in New Jersey Monthly magazine's September 2014 cover story on the state's "Top Public High Schools", using a new ranking methodology. The school had been ranked 179th in the state of 328 schools in 2012, after being ranked 194th in 2010 out of 322 schools listed. The magazine ranked the school 190th in 2008 out of 316 schools. The school was ranked 247th in the magazine's September 2006 issue, which surveyed 316 schools across the state.

== Athletics ==
The Gloucester City High School Lions compete as a member school in the Colonial Conference, which is comprised of public high schools in Camden and Gloucester counties, and operates under the supervision of the New Jersey State Interscholastic Athletic Association (NJSIAA). The school had been a member of the Tri-County Conference since it was established in 1928, and joined the Colonial Conference for the 2020-21 school year. With 480 students in grades 10-12, the school was classified by the NJSIAA for the 2022–24 school years as Group II South for most athletic competition purposes. The football team competes in the Colonial Division of the 94-team West Jersey Football League superconference and was classified by the NJSIAA as Group II South for football for 2024–2026, which included schools with 514 to 685 students.

Girls' championships include:

- 1996 Field hockey South Jersey Group I champion
- 1999 Cross country South Jersey Group I champion
- 1999 Field hockey Tri-County and South Jersey Group I champion
- 2000 Field hockey Tri-County and South Jersey Group I champion
- 2000 Softball Tri-County and Group I state champion (defeating Saddle Brook High School)
- 2001 Cross Country South Jersey Group I champion
- 2001 Softball Group I state champion (defeating Emerson Junior-Senior High School by a score of 11-4 in the finals)
- 2002 Field Hockey South Jersey Group I champion
- 2003 Cross Country Tri-County, South Jersey and Group I state champion
- 2004 Cross country Tri-County and South Jersey Group I champion
- 2004 Field hockey Tri-County and South Jersey Group I champion
- 2005 Softball Group I state champion (vs. Verona High School in the final)
- 2007 Softball Tri-County and South Jersey Group I champion
- 2009 Basketball Tri-County and South Jersey Group I champion
- 2009 Softball Tri-County, South Jersey and Group I state champion with a 3-0 win vs. Saddle Brook High School
- 2014 Bowling Tri-County, South Jersey Group I champion
- 2014 Softball South Jersey Group I champion, defeating Pennsville Memorial High School 6-0 in the final
- 2016 Softball South Jersey Group I champion, defeating Arthur P. Schalick High School 6-2 in the final.
- 2018 Softball South Jersey Group I Champion, defeating Audubon High School 1-0 in the final.
- 2021 Bowling South Jersey Group I champion
- 2022 Bowling South Jersey Group I champion
- 2023 Bowling South Jersey Group I champion
- 2024 Softball Group II state champion, defeating Ramsey High School 3-2 in the final
- 2025 Softball Group II state champion, defeating Hanover Park High School 3-2 in the final.

Boys' championships include:

- 1967 Basketball Group II state champion with a 70-47 win vs. Shore Regional High School in the school's first final, to finish the season with a record of 25-1
- 1971 Baseball Group I state champion vs. Hackettstown High School
- 1998 Baseball Tri-County champion
- 1998 Basketball Tri-County champion
- 1998 Football Tri-County champion
- 1999 Baseball Tri-County champion
- 2000 Bowling Olympic Conference champion
- 2001 Bowling Olympic Conference National Division champion
- 2002 Football Tri-County champion
- 2004 Baseball Tri-County champion
- 2012 Football Tri-County champion
- 2022 Basketball South Jersey Group I champion, defeating Salem High School 51-41 in final.
- 2022 Bowling South Jersey Group I Champion
- 2024 Baseball South Jersey Group I vs. Woodstown High School in the sectional finals by a score of 5-4

== Administration ==
The school's principal is Sean Gorman. The school's core administration team includes three assistant principals.

== Notable alumni ==
- Edward Durr (born 1963), politician and truck driver who represented the 3rd Legislative district in the New Jersey Senate from 2022 to 2024
- Rasheer Fleming (born 2004), basketball player for the Phoenix Suns
- Lucinda Florio (1947–2022), teacher and advocate for education and literacy, who, as the wife of former New Jersey Governor James Florio, served as the First Lady of New Jersey
