= Gloucester City, New Jersey =

City in Camden County, New Jersey, US

- City
- City of Gloucester City
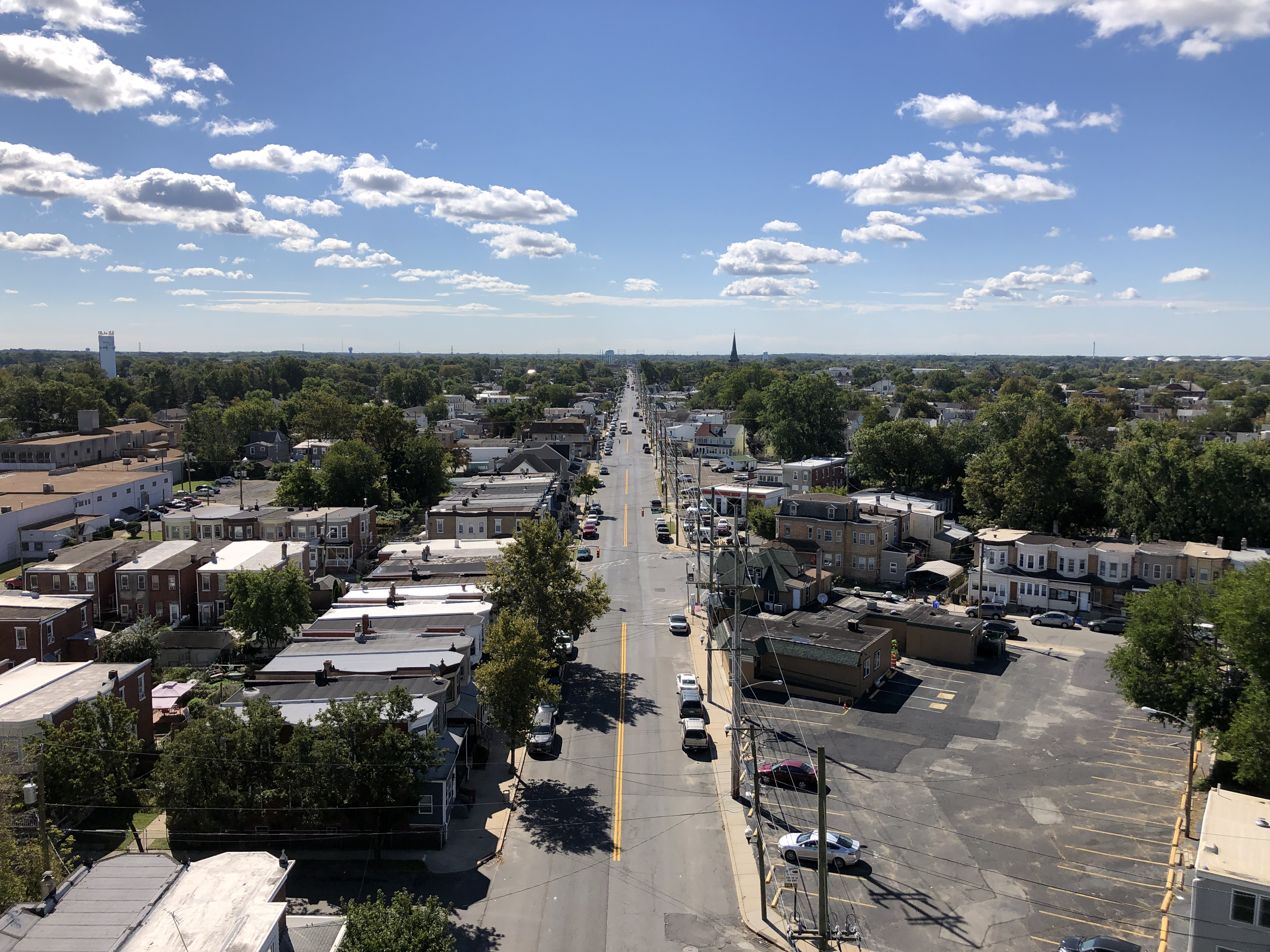
- View of downtown Gloucester City from the Walt Whitman Bridge

- logo

- Location of Gloucester City in Camden County highlighted in red (right). Inset map: Location of Camden County in New Jersey highlighted in orange (left).

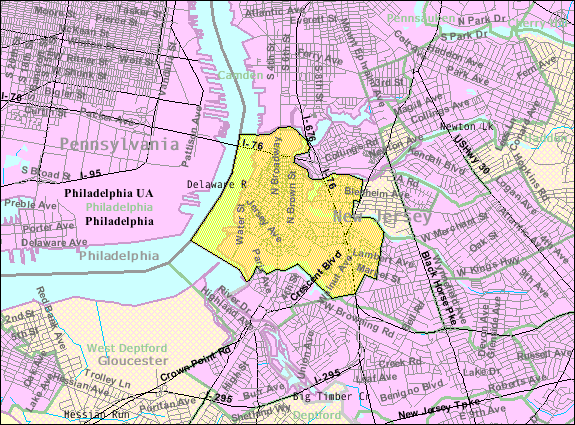
- Census Bureau map of Gloucester City, New Jersey

- Location in Camden County Location in New Jersey Location in the United States
- Coordinates: 39.891694°N 75.116692°W
- Country: United States
- State: New Jersey
- County: Camden
- European settlement: 1623; 403 years ago
- Incorporated: February 25, 1868
- Named for: Gloucester, England

Government
  - Type: Special charter
  - Body: City Council
  - Mayor: Dayl R. Baile (D, term ends December 31, 2026)
  - Municipal clerk: Vanessa L. Little

Area
  - Total: 2.76 sq mi (7.15 km^{2})
  - Land: 2.32 sq mi (6.00 km^{2})
  - Water: 0.45 sq mi (1.16 km^{2}) 16.41%
  - Rank: 359th of 565 in state 15th of 37 in county
- Elevation: 23 ft (7.0 m)

Population (2020)
  - Total: 11,484
  - Estimate (2023): 11,507
  - Rank: 219th of 565 in state 12th of 37 in county
  - Density: 4,960.7/sq mi (1,915.3/km^{2})
  - Rank: 113th of 565 in state 11th of 37 in county
- Time zone: UTC−05:00 (Eastern (EST))
  - Summer (DST): UTC−04:00 (Eastern (EDT))
- ZIP Codes: 08030
- Area code: 856 exchanges: 456, 742
- FIPS code: 34007268200
- GNIS feature ID: 0885234
- Website: cityofgloucester.org

Gloucester City is a city in Camden County, in the U.S. state of New Jersey. As of the 2020 United States census, the city's population was 11,484, an increase of 28 (+0.2%) from the 2010 census count of 11,456, which in turn reflected a decline of 28 (−0.2%) from the 11,484 counted in the 2000 census. It is located directly across the Delaware River from Philadelphia and the Port of Philadelphia.

Gloucester City was incorporated by an act of the New Jersey Legislature on February 25, 1868, from the remaining portions of Union Township, which was then dissolved. Additional territory was annexed in 1925 from Centre Township and in 1927 from Haddon Township. The city's name derives from Gloucester, England.

Gloucester City is known for its Irish American population, which was ninth-highest in the United States by percentage in the 2000 Census.

The city had the 23rd-highest property tax rate in New Jersey, with an equalized rate of 4.343% in 2020, compared to 3.470% in the county as a whole and a statewide average of 2.279%.

== History ==
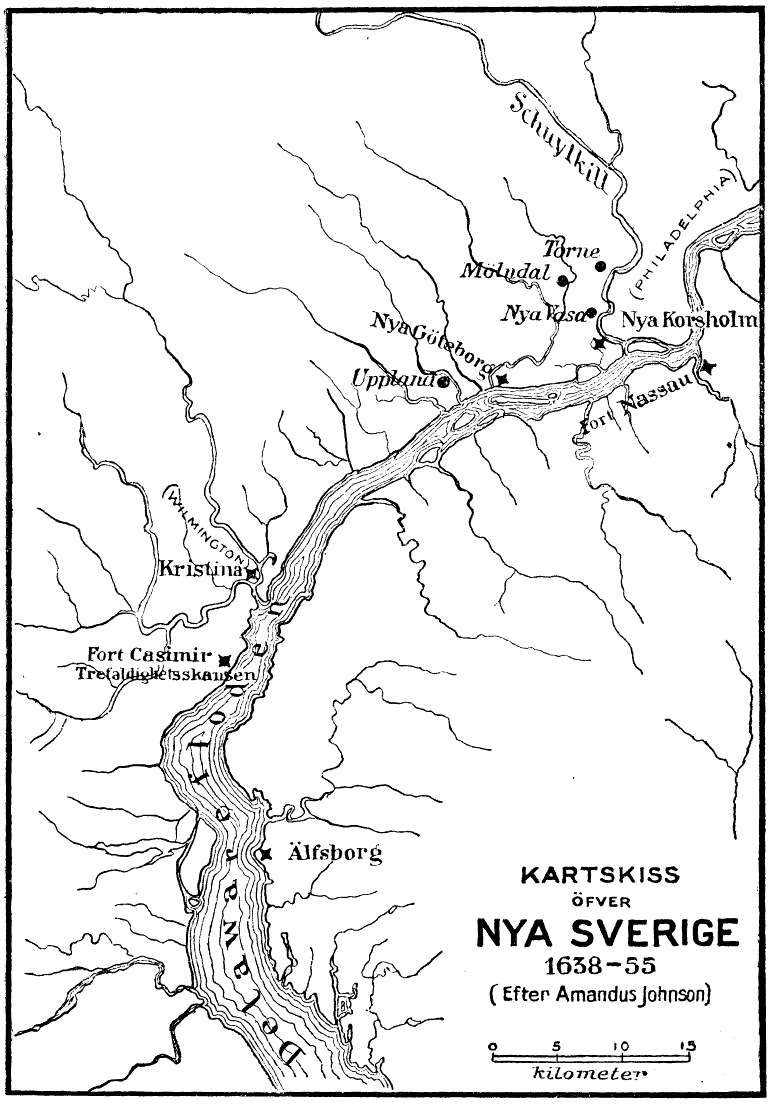
New Sweden, c. 1650

The name Fort Nassau was used by the Dutch in the 17th century for several fortifications, mostly trading stations, named for the House of Orange-Nassau. The one built in the 1620s at today's Gloucester City was for trade, mostly in beaver pelts, with the indigenous population of Susquehannock and Lenape. The region along the Delaware River and its bay was called the Zuyd Rivier and marked the southern flank of the province of New Netherland.

From 1638 to 1655 the area was part of New Sweden, which had been established by Peter Minuit, who had been Director of New Netherland, and was responsible for the famous purchase of the island of Manhattan. The location was disadvantageous since the richest fur-trapping area was on the west side of the river, where Swedish could intercept trade with the natives. In 1651, Peter Stuyvesant, director-general of New Netherland, dismantled the structure and relocated to a position on the other side of the river, in part to menace the Swedish, calling it Fort Casimir.

After the arrival of English Quakers on the Delaware, in 1677, a permanent settlement, at first called Axwamus, was established on the site of the present city. This was surveyed and laid out as a town in 1689. In 1868 it was chartered as a city.

== Geography ==
According to the United States Census Bureau, the city had a total area of 2.76 square miles (7.15 km^{2}), including 2.31 square miles (5.98 km^{2}) of land and 0.45 square miles (1.17 km^{2}) of water (16.41%).

Unincorporated communities, localities and place names located partially or completely within the city include Cloversdale, Gloucester Heights, Highland Park and Newbold.

The city borders the municipalities of Bellmawr, Brooklawn, Camden, Haddon Township, and Mount Ephraim. Gloucester City also borders Westville in Gloucester County and the city of Philadelphia in Pennsylvania, across the Delaware River.

== Demographics ==
Historical population
Census	Pop.	Note	%±
1870	3,682		—
1880	5,347		45.2%
1890	6,564		22.8%
1900	6,840		4.2%
1910	9,462		38.3%
1920	12,162		28.5%
1930	13,796		13.4%
1940	13,692		−0.8%
1950	14,357		4.9%
1960	15,511		8.0%
1970	14,707		−5.2%
1980	13,121		−10.8%
1990	12,649		−3.6%
2000	11,484		−9.2%
2010	11,456		−0.2%
2020	11,484		0.2%
2023 (est.)	11,507		0.2%
Population sources: 1870–2000; 1870–1920 1870 1880–1890; 1890–1910 1870–1930; 1940–2000 2000; 2010 2020

=== 2020 census ===
As of the 2020 census, Gloucester City had a population of 11,484. The median age was 36.4 years. 25.2% of residents were under the age of 18 and 14.1% of residents were 65 years of age or older. For every 100 females there were 99.5 males, and for every 100 females age 18 and over there were 95.4 males age 18 and over.

100.0% of residents lived in urban areas, while 0.0% lived in rural areas.

There were 4,111 households in Gloucester City, of which 35.4% had children under the age of 18 living in them. Of all households, 38.7% were married-couple households, 20.7% were households with a male householder and no spouse or partner present, and 30.1% were households with a female householder and no spouse or partner present. About 24.9% of all households were made up of individuals and 11.9% had someone living alone who was 65 years of age or older.

There were 4,547 housing units, of which 9.6% were vacant. The homeowner vacancy rate was 2.3% and the rental vacancy rate was 9.4%.

Racial composition as of the 2020 census
Race	Number	Percent
White	8,470	73.8%
Black or African American	723	6.3%
American Indian and Alaska Native	39	0.3%
Asian	436	3.8%
Native Hawaiian and Other Pacific Islander	10	0.1%
Some other race	873	7.6%
Two or more races	933	8.1%
Hispanic or Latino (of any race)	1,726	15.0%

=== 2010 census ===
The 2010 United States census counted 11,456 people, 4,248 households, and 2,804 families in the city. The population density was 4,937.8 per square mile (1,906.5/km^{2}). There were 4,712 housing units at an average density of 2,031.0 per square mile (784.2/km^{2}). The racial makeup was 90.52% (10,370) White, 3.07% (352) Black or African American, 0.14% (16) Native American, 2.68% (307) Asian, 0.00% (0) Pacific Islander, 1.82% (209) from other races, and 1.76% (202) from two or more races. Hispanic or Latino of any race were 6.70% (767) of the population.

Of the 4,248 households, 29.4% had children under the age of 18; 42.3% were married couples living together; 15.9% had a female householder with no husband present and 34.0% were non-families. Of all households, 27.4% were made up of individuals and 12.9% had someone living alone who was 65 years of age or older. The average household size was 2.70 and the average family size was 3.31.

24.5% of the population were under the age of 18, 9.3% from 18 to 24, 26.4% from 25 to 44, 26.9% from 45 to 64, and 12.8% who were 65 years of age or older. The median age was 36.7 years. For every 100 females, the population had 97.0 males. For every 100 females ages 18 and older there were 94.4 males.

The Census Bureau's 2006–2010 American Community Survey showed that (in 2010 inflation-adjusted dollars) median household income was $52,222 (with a margin of error of +/− $8,589) and the median family income was $58,825 (+/− $7,975). Males had a median income of $49,032 (+/− $3,038) versus $36,560 (+/− $2,335) for females. The per capita income for the city was $22,718 (+/− $1,341). About 12.2% of families and 14.2% of the population were below the poverty line, including 23.2% of those under age 18 and 8.8% of those age 65 or over.

=== 2000 census ===
As of the 2000 United States census there were 11,484 people, 4,213 households, and 2,839 families residing in the city. The population density was 5,213.7 inhabitants per square mile (2,013.0/km^{2}). There were 4,604 housing units at an average density of 2,090.2 per square mile (807.0/km^{2}). The racial makeup of the city was 97.14% White, 0.69% African American, 0.18% Native American, 0.68% Asian, 0.03% Pacific Islander, 0.64% from other races, and 0.64% from two or more races. Hispanic or Latino of any race were 1.88% of the population.

As of the 2000 Census, 34.2% of Gloucester City residents were of Irish ancestry, the ninth-highest percentage of any municipality in the United States, and third-highest in New Jersey, among all places with more than 1,000 residents identifying their ancestry.

There were 4,213 households, out of which 32.6% had children under the age of 18 living with them, 46.8% were married couples living together, 14.6% had a female householder with no husband present, and 32.6% were non-families. 27.2% of all households were made up of individuals, and 13.0% had someone living alone who was 65 years of age or older. The average household size was 2.72 and the average family size was 3.32.

In the city the population was spread out, with 26.5% under the age of 18, 9.0% from 18 to 24, 29.2% from 25 to 44, 21.5% from 45 to 64, and 13.8% who were 65 years of age or older. The median age was 36 years. For every 100 females, there were 95.0 males. For every 100 females age 18 and over, there were 92.0 males.

The median income for a household in the city was $36,855, and the median income for a family was $46,038. Males had a median income of $35,659 versus $24,907 for females. The per capita income for the city was $16,912. About 7.7% of families and 10.1% of the population were below the poverty line, including 10.7% of those under age 18 and 11.5% of those age 65 or over.

== Economy ==
Portions of the city are part of an Urban Enterprise Zone (UEZ), one of 32 zones covering 37 municipalities statewide. Gloucester City was selected in 2004 as one of two zones added to participate in the program. In addition to other benefits to encourage employment and investment within the Zone, shoppers can take advantage of a reduced 3.3125% sales tax rate (half of the 6 5/8% rate charged statewide) at eligible merchants. Established in August 2004, the city's Urban Enterprise Zone status expires in August 2024.

== Sports ==
Gloucester Point Grounds is a former baseball stadium that was the part-time home to the Philadelphia Athletics from 1888 to 1890, with the Athletics playing games there on Sunday to avoid blue law restrictions in Philadelphia.

John L. Sullivan World Champion Boxer had an exhibition match with William Muldoon Greco-Roman Wrestling Champion in Gloucester in 1889.

Annie Oakley performed in Gloucester City on July 2, 1888 at the grandstand Gloucester Point Grounds along the Gloucester Beach in New Jersey as part of the Pawnee Bill Frontier Exhibition. Oakley would return to Gloucester City for exhibitions in 1898.

== Government ==
=== Local government ===
Gloucester City is governed under a special charter, which was originally granted in 1868 by the New Jersey Legislature. The city is one of 11 municipalities (of the 564) statewide that use a special form. The governing body is comprised of the Mayor and the six-member City Council. The Mayor is elected at-large and serves a four-year term. The six members of the council are elected in a three-year cycle with three elected at-large one year and one each from three wards to three-year terms the next year, so that there are no council seats up for vote in one year in the three-year cycle. The Mayor and Common Council are responsible for making public policy that addresses the needs of the City and its residents. The Mayor and Common Council also appoint members of the Planning and Zoning Board, as well as the Board of Health.

As of 2024, the Mayor of Gloucester City is Democrat Dayl R. Baile, whose term of office ends December 31, 2026; he was first elected in November 2021 to serve the balance of the term of office of Dan Spencer, expiring in December 2022. Members of the City Council are Nancy Randolph Baus (D, 2024; Third Ward), George Berglund (D, 2024; First Ward), Ed Cilurso III (D, 2025; At Large - appointed to serve an unexpired term), James "Bowie" Johnson (D, 2024; Second Ward), Robert J. Page (D, 2025) and Derek Timm (D, 2025).

In December 2024, the city council appointed Ed Cilurso to the at-large seat expiring December 2025 that had been held by Sam Budesa until he left office; Cilurso will serve until the November 2024 general election, when voters will choose a candidate to serve the balance of the term of office.

Mayor Dan Spencer stepped down from office in June 2021 from a term of office expiring in December 2022. In June 2021, the City Council appointed councilmember-at-large Patrick Keating to fill the mayoral seat on an interim basis. Based on the results of the November 2021 general election, Dayl Baile was sworn into mayor, having been elected to fill the seat that had been held by Dan Spencer, while Robert Page took office in the at-large council seat that had been held by Patrick Keating. In January 2022, the city council appointed Derek Timm to fill the at-large seat expiring in December 2022 that had been held by Dayl Baile before he took office as mayor.

==== Emergency services ====
Gloucester City is protected by a career fire staff 24/7 Located at 1 N. King Street. The fire department operates 1 Squad Company 51 (rescue engine), 1 Quint Company 51 (105' ladder), 1 Battalion 504, 1 Hazardous Material (Hazmat 5), 2 Engine Companies (52,54 volunteer stations), 2 Marine (boat) units and several support units.

The Emergency Medical Services (EMS) is operated by Virtua EMS formally Lourdes Health. Virtua EMS is operated daily with two NJ state certified EMTs and/or paramedics and serve as a Basic Life Support (BLS) unit. BLS 557 and 558 is located at 230 Nicholson Road at the Gloucester Heights Fire Association building.

=== Federal, state and county representation ===
Gloucester City is located in the 1st Congressional District and is part of New Jersey's 5th state legislative district.

For the 119th United States Congress, New Jersey's 1st congressional district is represented by Donald Norcross (D, Camden). New Jersey is represented in the United States Senate by Democrats Cory Booker (Newark, term ends 2027) and Andy Kim (Moorestown, term ends 2031).

For the 2026–2027 session, the 5th legislative district of the New Jersey Legislature is represented in the State Senate by Nilsa Cruz-Perez (D, Barrington) and in the General Assembly by Bill Moen (D, Camden) and William Spearman (D, Camden).

Camden County is governed by a Board of County Commissioners composed of seven members chosen at-large in partisan elections for three-year terms on a staggered basis by the residents of the county, with either two or three seats up for election each year as part of the November general election. At a reorganization meeting held in January after each election, the newly constituted Board of Commissioners selects one member to serve as Director and another as Deputy Director, each serving a one-year term in that role. As of 2025, Camden County's Commissioners are: Commissioner Director Louis Cappelli Jr. (D, Collingswood, 2026), Commissioner Deputy Director Edward T. McDonnell (D, Pennsauken Township, 2025), Virginia Ruiz Betteridge (D, Runnemede, 2025), Almar Dyer (D, Pennsauken Township, 2027), Melinda Kane (D, Cherry Hill, 2027), Jeffrey L. Nash (D, Winslow Township, 2027), and Jonathan L. Young Sr. (D, Berlin Township, 2026).

Camden County's constitutional officers are: Clerk Pamela Rosen Lampitt (D, Cherry Hill, 2029) Sheriff Chuck Billingham (D, Gloucester City, 2027) and Surrogate Michelle Gentek-Mayer (D, Gloucester Township, 2025).

The sheriff of Camden County had been Charles H. Billingham, a resident of Gloucester City who had previously served as the city's mayor.

=== Politics ===
As of March 2011, there were a total of 6,726 registered voters in Gloucester City, of which 3,320 (49.4%) were registered as Democrats, 660 (9.8%) were registered as Republicans and 2,744 (40.8%) were registered as Unaffiliated. There were 2 voters registered to other parties.

Gubernatorial election results for Gloucester City
Year	Republican		Democratic		Third party(ies)	
Year	No.	%	No.	%	No.	%
2025	1,324	39.98%	1,969	59.45%	19	0.57%
2021	1,211	47.16%	1,321	51.44%	36	1.40%
2017	668	33.45%	1,253	62.74%	76	3.81%
2013	1,309	58.96%	870	39.19%	41	1.85%
2009	969	36.04%	1,473	54.78%	247	9.19%
2005	759	30.14%	1,627	64.61%	132	5.24%

In the 2012 presidential election, Democrat Barack Obama received 65.6% of the vote (2,624 cast), ahead of Republican Mitt Romney with 32.6% (1,303 votes), and other candidates with 1.8% (72 votes), among the 4,058 ballots cast by the city's 7,177 registered voters (59 ballots were spoiled), for a turnout of 56.5%. In the 2008 presidential election, Democrat Barack Obama received 59.2% of the vote here (2,611 cast), ahead of Republican John McCain, who received around 37.0% (1,631 votes), with 4,411 ballots cast among the city's 6,711 registered voters, for a turnout of 65.7%. In the 2004 presidential election, Democrat John Kerry received 58.9% of the vote here (2,698 ballots cast), outpolling Republican George W. Bush, who received around 38.3% (1,755 votes), with 4,578 ballots cast among the city's 6,653 registered voters, for a turnout percentage of 68.8.

United States presidential election results for Gloucester City
Year	Republican		Democratic		Third party(ies)	
Year	No.	%	No.	%	No.	%
2024	2,103	47.47%	2,266	51.15%	61	1.38%
2020	2,136	45.32%	2,509	53.24%	68	1.44%
2016	1,789	44.56%	2,100	52.30%	126	3.14%
2012	1,303	32.58%	2,624	65.62%	72	1.80%
2008	1,631	36.98%	2,611	59.19%	169	3.83%
2004	1,755	38.34%	2,698	58.93%	125	2.73%

In the 2013 gubernatorial election, Republican Chris Christie received 59.0% of the vote (1,309 cast), ahead of Democrat Barbara Buono with 39.2% (870 votes), and other candidates with 1.8% (41 votes), among the 2,310 ballots cast by the city's 7,097 registered voters (90 ballots were spoiled), for a turnout of 32.5%. In the 2009 gubernatorial election, Democrat Jon Corzine received 54.8% of the vote here (1,473 ballots cast), ahead of both Republican Chris Christie with 36.0% (969 votes) and Independent Chris Daggett with 4.2% (113 votes), with 2,689 ballots cast among the city's 6,708 registered voters, yielding a 40.1% turnout.

United States Senate election results for Gloucester City1
Year	Republican		Democratic		Third party(ies)	
Year	No.	%	No.	%	No.	%
2024	1,827	42.61%	2,392	55.78%	69	1.61%
2018	1,274	42.48%	1,454	48.48%	271	9.04%
2012	1,100	28.94%	2,635	69.32%	66	1.74%
2006	1,011	32.89%	1,930	62.78%	133	4.33%

United States Senate election results for Gloucester City2
Year	Republican		Democratic		Third party(ies)	
Year	No.	%	No.	%	No.	%
2020	1,981	42.71%	2,588	55.80%	69	1.49%
2014	637	30.95%	1,382	67.15%	39	1.90%
2013	476	43.08%	602	54.48%	27	2.44%
2008	1,271	31.32%	2,712	66.83%	75	1.85%

== Education ==
The Gloucester City Public Schools serve students in pre-kindergarten through twelfth grade. The district is one of 31 former Abbott districts statewide that were established pursuant to the decision by the New Jersey Supreme Court in Abbott v. Burke which are now referred to as "SDA Districts" based on the requirement for the state to cover all costs for school building and renovation projects in these districts under the supervision of the New Jersey Schools Development Authority. Students from Brooklawn attend the district's high school as part of a sending/receiving relationship with the Brooklawn Public School District.

As of the 2022–23 school year, the district, comprised of three schools, had an enrollment of 2,356 students and 176.8 classroom teachers (on an FTE basis), for a student–teacher ratio of 13.3:1. Schools in the district (with 2022–23 enrollment data from the National Center for Education Statistics) are Cold Springs Elementary School with 842 students in grades PreK-3, Gloucester City Middle School with 779 students in grades 4-8 and Gloucester City High School with 702 students in grades 9-12.

The Roman Catholic Diocese of Camden operates Gloucester Catholic High School, a co-educational Roman Catholic high school for grades 7-12 that opened in 1928. Saint Mary School was a Catholic grammar school that served grade levels from three- and four-year-old pre-school to eighth grade, which was closed by the diocese at the end of the 2010–2011 school year, in the wake of declining enrollment and rising deficits that were beyond the ability of the diocese to cover.

== Transportation ==
=== Roads and highways ===
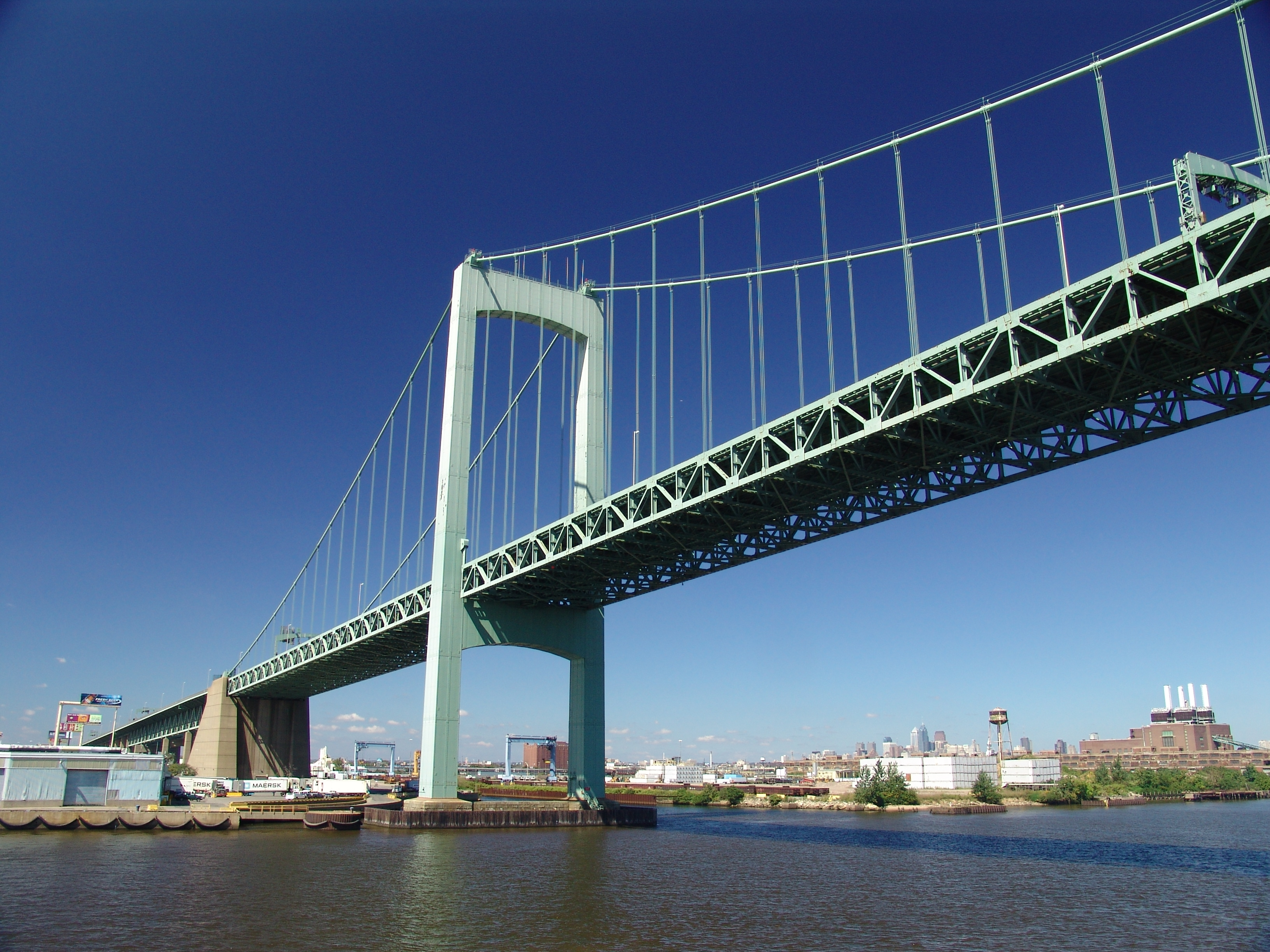
Walt Whitman Bridge connecting Gloucester City and Philadelphia, September 2004

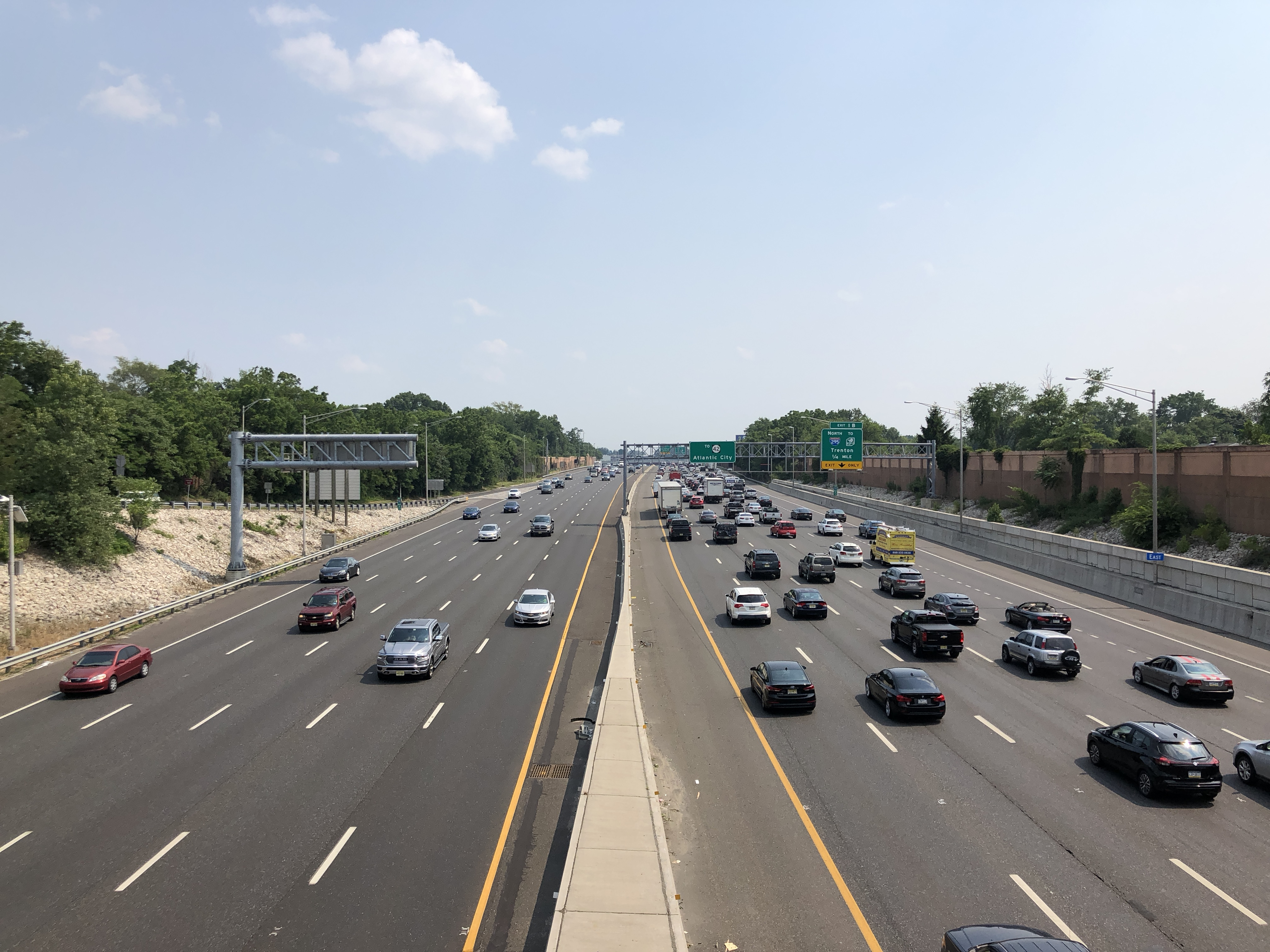
Eastbound Interstate 76 in Gloucester City

As of May 2010, the city had a total of 39.97 miles (64.33 km) of roadways, of which 29.52 miles (47.51 km) were maintained by the municipality, 7.10 miles (11.43 km) by Camden County, 2.63 miles (4.23 km) by the New Jersey Department of Transportation and 0.72 miles (1.16 km) by the Delaware River Port Authority.

Interstate 76 is the main highway passing through Gloucester City. It enters Gloucester City from Philadelphia, skims the north side of the city, briefly enters Camden, then reenters Gloucester City as it turns south towards its eastern terminus at Interstate 295 beyond the city limits.

The Walt Whitman Bridge is the suspension bridge carrying Interstate 76 west over the Delaware River to Philadelphia. The bridge, which extends for almost 12,000 feet (3,700 m) between abutments, opened to traffic on May 16, 1957. U.S. Route 130 also travels through Gloucester City.

=== Public transportation ===
NJ Transit bus service is available to Philadelphia on routes 401 (from Salem), 402 (from Pennsville), 408 (from Millville), 410 (from Bridgeton) and 412 (from Sewell), with local service on the 457 route between the Moorestown Mall and Camden.

The city is expected to be a stop on the Glassboro–Camden Line, a planned 18-mile (28.97 km) diesel multiple unit (DMU) light rail system.

== Notable people ==
People who were born in, residents of, or otherwise closely associated with Gloucester City include:

- James Barton (1890–1962), vaudevillian, stage performer and character actor in films and television
- Agnus Berenato (born 1956), former women's basketball program head coach at Rider University (1982–1985), Georgia Tech (1989–2003) and University of Pittsburgh (2012–2013)
- Jack Collins (born 1943), former Speaker of the New Jersey General Assembly
- Edward Durr (born 1963), politician and truck driver who represents the 3rd Legislative district in the New Jersey Senate
- Rasheer Fleming (born 2004), professional basketball player for the Phoenix Suns of the National Basketball Association
- Lucinda Florio (1947–2022), teacher and advocate for education and literacy, who, as the wife of former New Jersey Governor James Florio, served as the First Lady of New Jersey
- Francis J. Gorman (1924–1987), politician who served seven terms in the New Jersey General Assembly
- Patrick T. Harker (born 1958), President of the University of Delaware (2007–2015)
- Eliza Leslie (1787–1858), author of popular cookbooks during the nineteenth century
- Betsy Ross (1752–1836), best known as the purported creator of the flag that shares her name, the Betsy Ross Flag

== Popular culture ==
- Gloucester City is cited by some as the birthplace of rock and roll. Bill Haley & His Comets—originally a country music band called "Bill Haley and the Saddlemen"—were the house band playing at the Twin Bar for 18 months starting in the early 1950s and are said to have modified their performing style while on stage there to an early form of rock and roll.
- In 1881, painter Thomas Eakins completed two versions of "Shad-Fishing at Gloucester on the Delaware River". A watercolor version is housed in the Metropolitan Museum of Art in New York City, while an oil on canvas version is on display at the Philadelphia Museum of Art in Philadelphia, just across the Delaware River from Gloucester City.
- On November 4, 1773, Elizabeth Griscom married John Ross at Huggs Tavern. Elizabeth is better known as Betsy Ross, a flag maker during the early days of the United States. Huggs Tavern was torn down in the 1920s; the former site of the tavern is part of what is now Proprietor's Park.
- Parts of the 1988 movie Clean and Sober—starring Michael Keaton—were shot in Gloucester City. The film prominently features the property at 215 Morris Street, which acts as the home of characters played by Kathy Baker and Luca Bercovici.

Preceded by Camden	Bordering communities of Philadelphia	Succeeded by Brooklawn
