= Elk Township School District =

School District in Gloucester County, New Jersey, US

Address
- 98 Unionville Road Elk Township, Gloucester County, New Jersey, 08028; United States
- Coordinates: 39.674444°N 75.143974°W

District information
- Grades: PreK-6
- Superintendent: Fran Ciociola
- Business administrator: Joseph Collins
- Schools: 1

Students and staff
- Enrollment: 336 (as of 2022–23)
- Faculty: 32.6 FTEs
- Student–teacher ratio: 10.3:1

Other information
- District Factor Group: B
- Website: www.auraelementary.us
Ind.	Per pupil	District spending	Rank (*)	K-6 average	%± vs. average
1A	Total Spending	$16,721	24	$18,891	−11.5%
1	Budgetary Cost	12,836	14	13,649	−6.0%
2	Classroom Instruction	8,058	17	8,366	−3.7%
6	Support Services	2,075	26	2,161	−4.0%
8	Administrative Cost	1,366	20	1,467	−6.9%
10	Operations & Maintenance	1,236	9	1,552	−20.4%
13	Extracurricular Activities	14	9	39	−64.1%
16	Median Teacher Salary	56,619	28	57,437
Data from NJDoE 2014 Taxpayers' Guide to Education Spending. *Of K-6 districts with any number of students. Lowest spending=1; Highest=59

The Elk Township School District is a community public school district that serves students in pre-kindergarten through sixth grade from Elk Township, in Gloucester County, in the U.S. state of New Jersey.

As of the 2022–23 school year, the district, comprised of one school, had an enrollment of 336 students and 32.6 classroom teachers (on an FTE basis), for a student–teacher ratio of 10.3:1.

The district participates in the Interdistrict Public School Choice Program, which allows non-resident students to attend school in the district at no cost to their parents, with tuition covered by the resident district. Available slots are announced annually by grade.

For seventh through twelfth grades, public school students attend the Delsea Regional School District, which serves students from both Elk Township and Franklin Township. Students from Newfield attend the district's schools as part of a sending/receiving relationship begun in September 2010 after Newfield ended its prior relationship with the Buena Regional School District. Schools in the district (with 2022–23 enrollment data from the National Center for Education Statistics) are Delsea Regional Middle School with 518 students in grades 7-8 and Delsea Regional High School with 1,074 students in grades 9-12.

== History ==
Aura School was built in 1927 and rededicated in 1949 after a fire the previous year, with the newest addition built in 2002.

Students from Elk Township had attended Glassboro High School as part as part of a sending/receiving relationship with the Glassboro Public Schools until Delsea Regional High School opened for the 1960–61 school year.

The New Jersey Department of Education considered a vote by the Board of Education of the Franklin Township Public Schools in June 2010 requesting that the district withdraw from the Delsea Regional School District, which would require that the Delsea region be dissolved as about 80% of the regional district's students come from Franklin. With the withdrawal of Franklin Township, the two options to consider were to have Franklin and Elk Townships create a new regional district with Newfield students attending on a send-receive basis, or to have Franklin Township establish its own PreK-12 district which would receive students from both Elk Township and Newfield.

The district had been classified by the New Jersey Department of Education as being in District Factor Group "B", the second lowest of eight groupings. District Factor Groups organize districts statewide to allow comparison by common socioeconomic characteristics of the local districts. From lowest socioeconomic status to highest, the categories are A, B, CD, DE, FG, GH, I, and J.

== School ==
Aura School had an enrollment of 334 students in grades PreK-6 as of the 2022–23 school year.

- Briean Madden, principal

== Administration ==
Core members of the district's administration are:

- Fran Ciociola, superintendent
- Joseph Collins, business administrator and board secretary

== Board of education ==
The district's board of education is comprised of nine members who set policy and oversee the fiscal and educational operation of the district through its administration. As a Type II school district, the board's trustees are elected directly by voters to serve three-year terms of office on a staggered basis, with three seats up for election each year held (since 2012) as part of the November general election. The board appoints a superintendent to oversee the district's day-to-day operations and a business administrator to supervise the business functions of the district.

Elk Township's Board of Education members are Joyce Massot-Burnett, Vice President Angelique Stoney-Siplin, Colleen Barbaro, J. Wilson Hughes, Lynnette Peterson, Cheryl Potte, Sarah Ruczyski, Eugene Thomas and Jacqueline Wraight.
