= Mantua Township School District =

School district in Gloucester County, New Jersey, US

Address
- 684 Main Street Sewell, Gloucester County, New Jersey, 08080; United States
- Coordinates: 39.762206°N 75.160998°W

District information
- Grades: PreK-6
- Superintendent: Christine R. Trampé
- Business administrator: Denise DiGiandomenico (interim business administrator); Michelle Jankauskas (board secretary)
- Schools: 3

Students and staff
- Enrollment: 1,256 (as of 2022–23)
- Faculty: 135.5 FTEs
- Student–teacher ratio: 9.3:1

Other information
- District Factor Group: FG
- Website: www.mantuaschools.com
Ind.	Per pupil	District spending	Rank (*)	K-6 average	%± vs. average
1A	Total Spending	$16,287	17	$18,891	−13.8%
1	Budgetary Cost	13,621	20	13,649	−0.2%
2	Classroom Instruction	8,743	27	8,366	4.5%
6	Support Services	1,925	19	2,161	−10.9%
8	Administrative Cost	1,400	21	1,467	−4.6%
10	Operations & Maintenance	1,514	27	1,552	−2.4%
13	Extracurricular Activities	39	22	39	0.0%
Data from NJDoE 2014 Taxpayers' Guide to Education Spending. *Of K-6 districts with any number of students. Lowest spending=1; Highest=59

The Mantua Township School District is a community public school district that serves students in pre-kindergarten through sixth grade from Mantua Township, in Gloucester County, in the U.S. state of New Jersey.

As of the 2022–23 school year, the district, comprising three schools, had an enrollment of 1,256 students and 135.5 classroom teachers (on an FTE basis), for a student–teacher ratio of 9.3:1.

The district is classified by the New Jersey Department of Education as being in District Factor Group "FG", the fourth-highest of eight groupings. District Factor Groups organize districts statewide to allow comparison by common socioeconomic characteristics of the local districts. From lowest socioeconomic status to highest, the categories are A, B, CD, DE, FG, GH, I and J.

Public school students in seventh through twelfth grades attend the schools of the Clearview Regional High School District, which serves students from Harrison Township and Mantua Township. Schools in the high school district (with 2022–23 enrollment data from the National Center for Education Statistics) are Clearview Regional Middle School with 753 students in grades 7-8 and Clearview Regional High School with 1,431 students in grades 9–12. Seats on the high school district's nine-member board are allocated based on population, with five seats assigned to Mantua Township.

== History ==
Students in grades 7-12 from Mantua Township had attended Pitman High School as part of a sending/receiving relationship until Clearview Regional High School opened for the 1960–61 school year.

== Schools ==
Schools in the district (with 2022–23 enrollment data from the National Center for Education Statistics) are:

- Sewell School with 290 students in pre-kindergarten and kindergarten
  - Katelyn Donocoff, principal
- Centre City School with 492 students in grades 1–3
  - Jennifer Cavalieri, principal
- J. Mason Tomlin School with 473 students in grades 4–6
  - Christine Connelly, principal

== Administration ==
Core members of the district's administration are:

- Christine R. Trampé, superintendent
- Denise DiGiandomenico, interim business administrator
- Michelle Jankauskas, board secretary

== Board of education ==
The district's board of education, comprised of nine members, sets policy and oversees the fiscal and educational operation of the district through its administration. As a Type II school district, the board's trustees are elected directly by voters to serve three-year terms of office on a staggered basis, with three seats up for election each year held (since 2012) as part of the November general election. The board appoints a superintendent to oversee the district's day-to-day operations and a business administrator to supervise the business functions of the district.
