= Mount Royal, New Jersey =

Populated place in Gloucester County, New Jersey, US

- Census-designated place
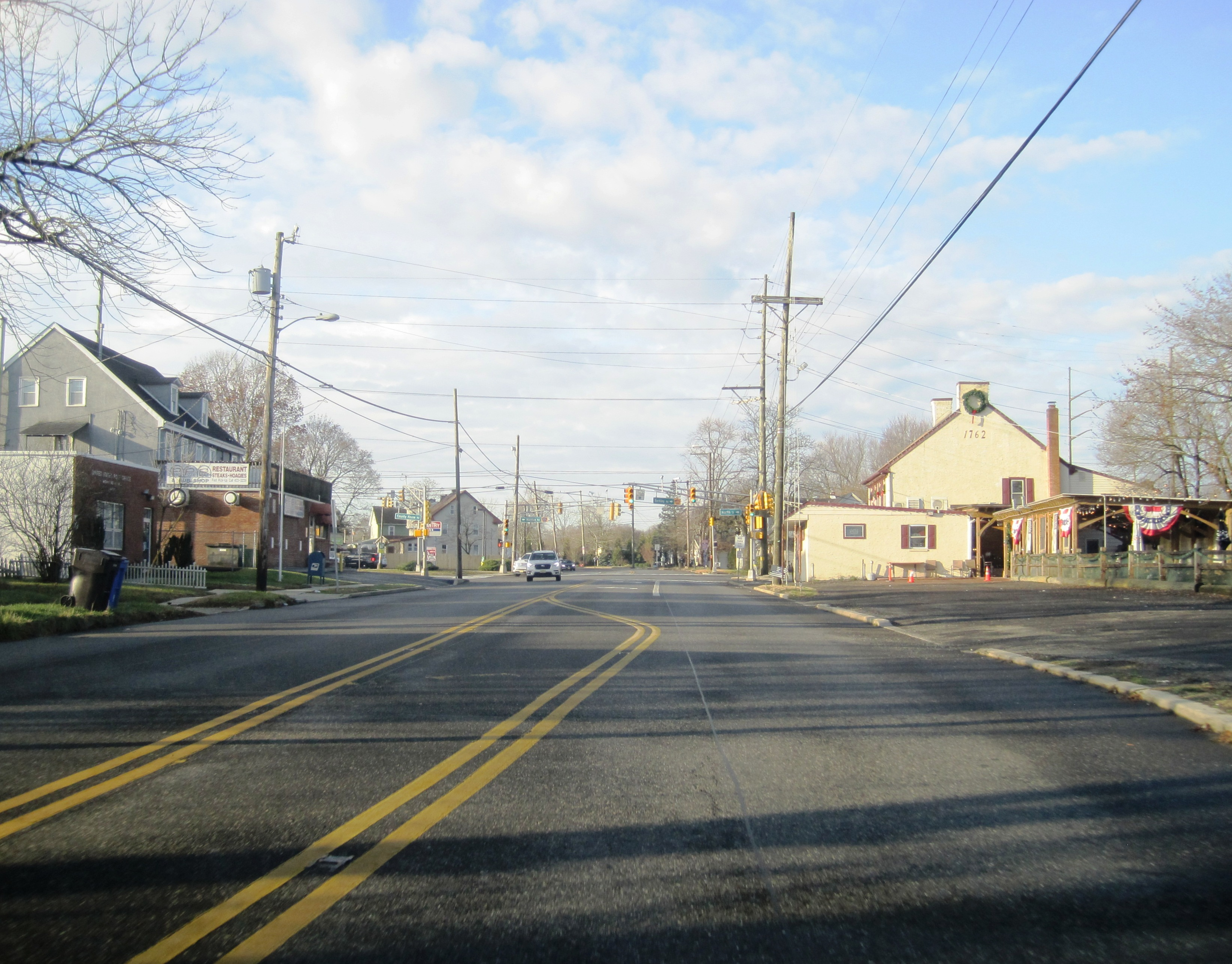
- Center of Mount Royal along southbound CR 551 (Kings Highway)

- Location in Gloucester County Location in New Jersey Location in the United States
- Coordinates: 39°48′36″N 75°12′41″W
- Country: United States
- State: New Jersey
- County: Gloucester
- Township: East Greenwich

Area
  - Total: 0.60 sq mi (1.56 km^{2})
  - Land: 0.55 sq mi (1.43 km^{2})
  - Water: 0.050 sq mi (0.13 km^{2})
- Elevation: 33 ft (10 m)

Population (2020)
  - Total: 777
  - Density: 1,410.8/sq mi (544.71/km^{2})
- ZIP Code: 08061
- FIPS code: 34-49200
- GNIS feature ID: 0878584

Mount Royal is an unincorporated community and census-designated place located within East Greenwich Township in Gloucester County, in the U.S. state of New Jersey. The area is served as United States Postal Service ZIP Code 08061.

As of the 2020 census, Mount Royal had a population of 777.

== Demographics ==
Historical population
Census	Pop.	Note	%±
2020	777		—
U.S. Decennial Census; 2020

Mount Royal was first listed as a census designated place in the 2020 U.S. census.

Mount Royal CDP, New Jersey – Racial and ethnic composition Note: the US Census treats Hispanic/Latino as an ethnic category. This table excludes Latinos from the racial categories and assigns them to a separate category. Hispanics/Latinos may be of any race.
Race / Ethnicity (NH = Non-Hispanic)	Pop 2020	2020
White alone (NH)	606	77.99%
Black or African American alone (NH)	64	8.24%
Native American or Alaska Native alone (NH)	0	0.00%
Asian alone (NH)	18	2.32%
Native Hawaiian or Pacific Islander alone (NH)	0	0.00%
Other race alone (NH)	6	0.77%
Mixed race or Multiracial (NH)	30	3.86%
Hispanic or Latino (any race)	53	6.82%
Total	777	100.00%

As of 2020, the population was 777.

== Transportation ==
The Swedesboro Railroad built its line from Woodbury to Swedesboro through the town, opening in October 1869 under lease to the West Jersey Railroad. It is still operated for freight traffic by the Southern Railroad of New Jersey.

== Education ==
East Greenwich Township School District serves grades K-6 with 7-12 served by Kingsway Regional School District.

Guardian Angels Regional School is a K-8 school that operates under the auspices of the Roman Catholic Diocese of Camden. Its PreK-3 campus is in Gibbstown while its 4-8 campus is in Paulsboro.
