= Harrison Township School District =

School district in New Jersey, United States

Address
- 120 North Main Street Mullica Hill, Gloucester County, New Jersey, 08062; United States
- Coordinates: 39.746488°N 75.22018°W

District information
- Grades: PreK-6
- Superintendent: Margaret "Missy" Peretti
- Business administrator: Christopher C. DeSanto
- Schools: 2

Students and staff
- Enrollment: 1,341 (as of 2022–23)
- Faculty: 107.8 FTEs
- Student–teacher ratio: 12.4:1

Other information
- District Factor Group: GH
- Website: www.harrisontwp.k12.nj.us
Ind.	Per pupil	District spending	Rank (*)	K-6 average	%± vs. average
1A	Total Spending	$14,684	4	$18,891	−22.3%
1	Budgetary Cost	11,224	5	13,649	−17.8%
2	Classroom Instruction	7,422	8	8,366	−11.3%
6	Support Services	1,104	1	2,161	−48.9%
8	Administrative Cost	1,243	7	1,467	−15.3%
10	Operations & Maintenance	1,290	16	1,552	−16.9%
16	Median Teacher Salary	58,153	31	57,437
Data from NJDoE 2014 Taxpayers' Guide to Education Spending. *Of K-6 districts with any number of students. Lowest spending=1; Highest=59

The Harrison Township School District is a comprehensive community public school district serving students in pre-kindergarten through sixth grade from Harrison Township, in Gloucester County, in the U.S. state of New Jersey.

As of the 2022–23 school year, the district, comprised of two schools, had an enrollment of 1,341 students and 107.8 classroom teachers (on an FTE basis), for a student–teacher ratio of 12.4:1.

Public school students in seventh through twelfth grades attend the schools of the Clearview Regional High School District, which serves students from Harrison Township and Mantua Township. Schools in the high school district (with 2022–23 enrollment data from the National Center for Education Statistics) are Clearview Regional Middle School with 753 students in grades 7-8 and Clearview Regional High School with 1,431 students in grades 9-12. Seats on the high school district's nine-member board are allocated based on population, with four seats assigned to Harrison Township.

== History ==
In the era of de jure educational segregation in the United States the district maintained a separate grade 1-8 school for black children in Mullica Hill. In 1948 it had one teacher.

The district had been classified by the New Jersey Department of Education as being in District Factor Group "GH", the third-highest of eight groupings. District Factor Groups organize districts statewide to allow comparison by common socioeconomic characteristics of the local districts. From lowest socioeconomic status to highest, the categories are A, B, CD, DE, FG, GH, I and J.

== Awards and recognition ==
For the 2003-04 school year, Pleasant Valley School received the National Blue Ribbon School Award of Excellence from the United States Department of Education, the highest honor that an American school can achieve.

Harrison Township School was recognized by Governor Jim McGreevey in 2003 as one of 25 schools selected statewide for the First Annual Governor's School of Excellence award.

== Schools ==
Schools in the district (with 2022–23 enrollment data from the National Center for Education Statistics) are:

- Harrison Township Elementary School with 770 students in grades PreK–3
  - AnnaLisa Rodano, principal
- Pleasant Valley School with 568 students in grades 4–6
  - Karen Russo, principal

== Administration ==
Core members of the district's administration are:

- Margaret "Missy" Peretti, superintendent
- Christopher C. DeSanto, business administrator and board secretary

== Board of education ==
The district's board of education, comprised of nine members, sets policy and oversees the fiscal and educational operation of the district through its administration. As a Type II school district, the board's trustees are elected directly by voters to serve three-year terms of office on a staggered basis, with three seats up for election each year held (since 2012) as part of the November general election. The board appoints a superintendent to oversee the district's day-to-day operations and a business administrator to supervise the business functions of the district.
