= South Harrison Township School District =

School district in Gloucester County, New Jersey, US

Address
- 904 Mullica Hill Road Harrisonville, Gloucester County, New Jersey, 08039; United States
- Coordinates: 39.689859°N 75.265999°W

District information
- Grades: PreK to 6
- Superintendent: Scott J. Hogan
- Business administrator: Sarah Bell
- Schools: 1

Students and staff
- Enrollment: 334 (as of 2022–23)
- Faculty: 25.0 FTEs
- Student–teacher ratio: 13.4:1

Other information
- District Factor Group: FG
- Website: www.shsd.us
Ind.	Per pupil	District spending	Rank (*)	K-6 average	%± vs. average
1A	Total Spending	$15,574	10	$18,891	−17.6%
1	Budgetary Cost	11,136	4	13,649	−18.4%
2	Classroom Instruction	6,445	3	8,366	−23.0%
6	Support Services	1,799	14	2,161	−16.8%
8	Administrative Cost	1,353	18	1,467	−7.8%
10	Operations & Maintenance	1,482	24	1,552	−4.5%
13	Extracurricular Activities	4	1	39	−89.7%
16	Median Teacher Salary	46,626	2	57,437
Data from NJDoE 2014 Taxpayers' Guide to Education Spending. *Of K-6 districts with any number of students. Lowest spending=1; Highest=59

The South Harrison Township School District is a community public school district that serves students in pre-kindergarten through sixth grade from South Harrison Township, in Gloucester County, in the U.S. state of New Jersey.

As of the 2022–23 school year, the district, comprised of one school, had an enrollment of 334 students and 25.0 classroom teachers (on an FTE basis), for a student–teacher ratio of 13.4:1.

The district participates in the Interdistrict Public School Choice Program at South Harrison Township Elementary School, having been approved in July 2001 to participate in the program. Seats in the program for non-resident students are specified by the district and are allocated by lottery, with tuition paid for participating students by the New Jersey Department of Education.

The district is classified by the New Jersey Department of Education as being in District Factor Group "FG", the fourth-highest of eight groupings. District Factor Groups organize districts statewide to allow comparison by common socioeconomic characteristics of the local districts. From lowest socioeconomic status to highest, the categories are A, B, CD, DE, FG, GH, I and J.

For seventh through twelfth grades, public school students are educated by the Kingsway Regional School District. The district also serves students from East Greenwich Township, Swedesboro and Woolwich Township, with the addition of students from Logan Township who attend as part of a sending/receiving relationship in which tuition is paid on a per-pupil basis by the Logan Township School District. As of the 2020–21 school year, the district, comprised of two schools, had an enrollment of 2,868 students and 207.8 classroom teachers (on an FTE basis), for a student–teacher ratio of 13.8:1. Schools in the district (with 2020–21 enrollment data from the National Center for Education Statistics) are Kingsway Regional Middle School with 1,023 students in grades 7-8 and Kingsway Regional High School with 1,802 students in grades 9-12. Under a 2011 proposal, Kingsway would have merged with its constituent member's K-6 districts to become a full K-12 district, with various options for including Logan Township as part of the consolidated district.

== School ==
South Harrison Township Elementary School had an enrollment of 315 students as of the 2020–21 school year.

- Scott J. Hogan, principal

== Administration ==
Core members of the district's administration are:

- Scott J. Hogan, superintendent
- Sarah Bell, business administrator and board secretary

== Board of education ==
The district's board of education, comprised of nine members, sets policy and oversees the fiscal and educational operation of the district through its administration. As a Type II school district, the board's trustees are elected directly by voters to serve three-year terms of office on a staggered basis, with three seats up for election each year held (since 2012) as part of the November general election. The board appoints a superintendent to oversee the district's day-to-day operations and a business administrator to supervise the business functions of the district.
