= Swedesboro-Woolwich School District =

School district in Gloucester County, New Jersey, US

Address
- 15 Fredrick Boulevard Woolwich Township, Gloucester County, New Jersey, 08085; United States
- Coordinates: 39.748539°N 75.332887°W

District information
- Grades: PreK-6
- Superintendent: Jacquelyn Traini
- Business administrator: Korey Jeffries
- Schools: 4

Students and staff
- Enrollment: 1,495 (as of 2020–21)
- Faculty: 138.7 FTEs
- Student–teacher ratio: 10.8:1

Other information
- District Factor Group: DE
- Website: www.swedesboro-woolwich.com
Ind.	Per pupil	District spending	Rank (*)	K-6 average	%± vs. average
1A	Total Spending	$14,717	5	$18,891	−22.1%
1	Budgetary Cost	10,734	3	13,649	−21.4%
2	Classroom Instruction	6,795	4	8,366	−18.8%
6	Support Services	1,397	4	2,161	−35.4%
8	Administrative Cost	1,248	8	1,467	−14.9%
10	Operations & Maintenance	1,283	15	1,552	−17.3%
13	Extracurricular Activities	8	5	39	−79.5%
16	Median Teacher Salary	53,656	16	57,437
Data from NJDoE 2014 Taxpayers' Guide to Education Spending. *Of K-6 districts with any number of students. Lowest spending=1; Highest=59

The Swedesboro-Woolwich School District is a consolidated public school district that serves students in pre-kindergarten through sixth grade from Swedesboro and Woolwich Township, two communities in Gloucester County, in the U.S. state of New Jersey.

As of the 2020–21 school year, the district, comprising four schools, had an enrollment of 1,495 students and 138.7 classroom teachers (on an FTE basis), for a student–teacher ratio of 10.8:1.

The district is classified by the New Jersey Department of Education as being in District Factor Group "DE", the fifth-highest of eight groupings. District Factor Groups organize districts statewide to allow comparison by common socioeconomic characteristics of the local districts. From lowest socioeconomic status to highest, the categories are A, B, CD, DE, FG, GH, I and J.

Public school students in seventh through twelfth grades from both communities are educated by the Kingsway Regional School District, which also serves students from East Greenwich Township and South Harrison Township, with the addition of students from Logan Township who attend as part of a sending/receiving relationship in which tuition is paid on a per-pupil basis by the Logan Township School District. As of the 2020–21 school year, the high school district, comprising two schools, had an enrollment of 2,868 students and 207.8 classroom teachers (on an FTE basis), for a student–teacher ratio of 13.8:1. The schools in the district (with 2020–21 enrollment data from the National Center for Education Statistics) are Kingsway Regional Middle School with 1,023 students in grades 7-8 and Kingsway Regional High School with 1,802 students in grades 9-12. Under a 2011 proposal, Kingsway would merge with its constituent member's K-6 districts to become a full K-12 district, with various options for including Logan Township as part of the consolidated district.

== History ==
For a 40-year period from 1923 to 1963, the district had operated Swedesboro High School. The school closed after Kingsway Regional High School opened in September 1963. Designed to accommodate an enrollment of 1,000 and constructed at a cost of $1.75 million, the school opened in for students in grades 7-12, including students in grades 9-12 who had previously attended Swedesboro High School. Prior to the regional high school's opening, students had attended either Swedesboro High School or Woodstown High School.

== Schools ==
Schools in the district (with 2020–21 enrollment data from the National Center for Education Statistics) are:

- Margaret C. Clifford School with 230 students in grades PreK-K (located in Swedesboro)
  - Rob Titus, principal
- Governor Charles C. Stratton School with 402 students in grades 1-2 (Woolwich Township)
  - Leigh Donato, principal
- General Charles G. Harker School with 653 students in Grades 3-5 (Woolwich Township)
  - Carolynne Sandy, principal
- Walter H. Hill School with 210 students in Grade 6 (Swedesboro)
  - Rob Titus, principal

== Administration ==
Core members of the district's administration are:

- Jacquelyn Traini, superintendent
- Korey Jeffries, business administrator and board secretary

== Board of education ==
The district's board of education is comprised of nine members. As a Type II school district, the board's trustees are elected directly by the voters of the constituent municipalities to serve three-year terms of office on a staggered basis, with three seats up for election each year held (since 2012) as part of the November general election. The board appoints a superintendent to oversee the district's day-to-day operations and a business administrator to supervise the business functions of the district.
