= Franklinville, New Jersey =

Populated place in Gloucester County, New Jersey, US

- Census-designated place
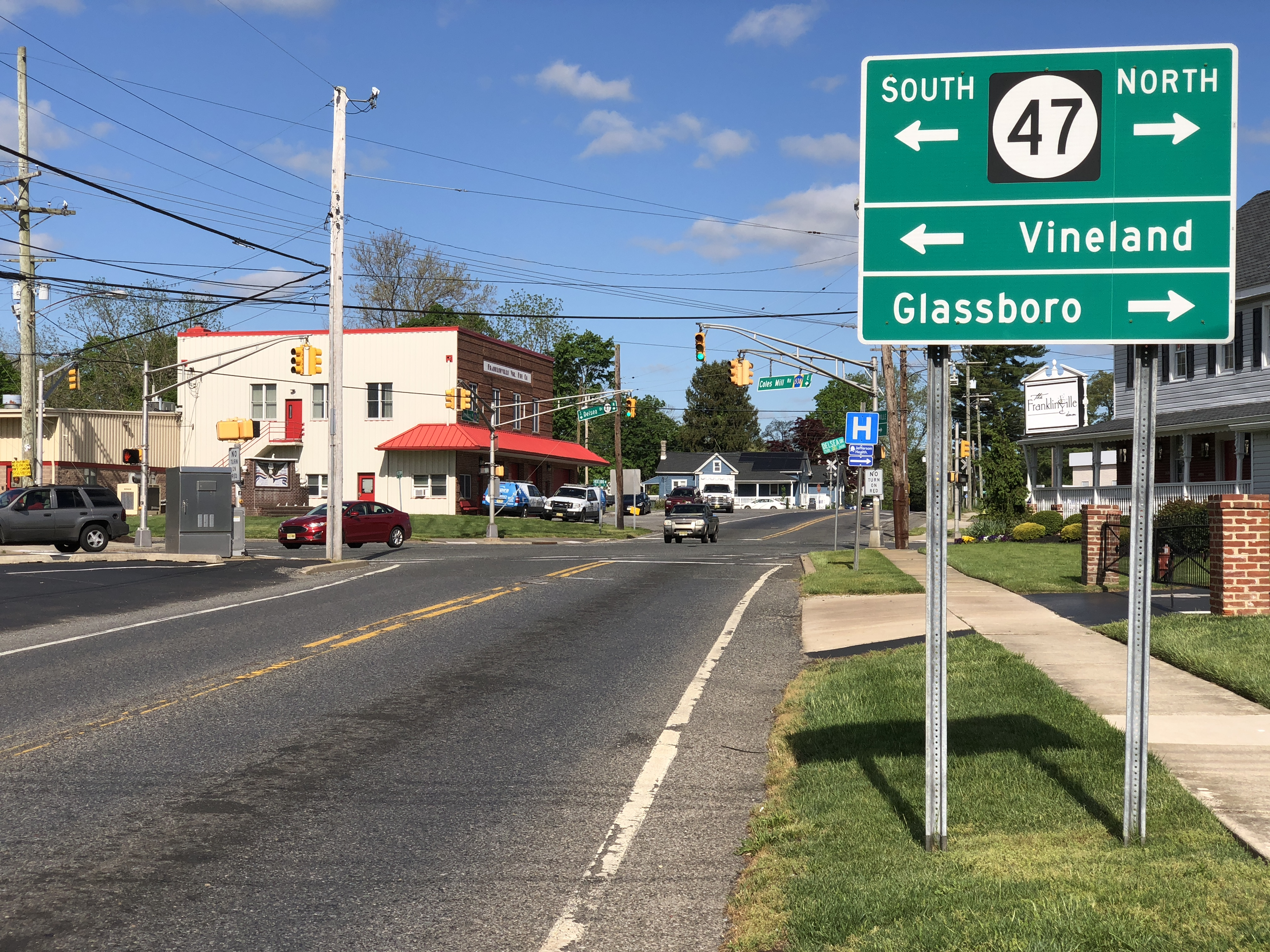
- Intersection of Route 47 (Delsea Drive) and CR 538 in the center of Franklinville

- Franklinville's location in Gloucester County (Inset: Gloucester County in New Jersey) Franklinville (New Jersey) Franklinville (the United States)
- Coordinates: 39°37′05″N 75°04′33″W
- Country: United States
- State: New Jersey
- County: Gloucester
- Township: Franklin

Area
  - Total: 3.52 sq mi (9.11 km^{2})
  - Land: 3.44 sq mi (8.92 km^{2})
  - Water: 0.073 sq mi (0.19 km^{2})
- Elevation: 98 ft (30 m)

Population (2020)
  - Total: 1,927
  - Density: 559.5/sq mi (216.04/km^{2})
- ZIP Code: 08322
- FIPS code: 34-25050
- GNIS feature ID: 0876497

Franklinville is an unincorporated community and census-designated place (CDP) located within Franklin Township in Gloucester County, in the Philadelphia Metropolitan Area in the U.S. state of New Jersey. The area is served as United States Postal Service ZIP Code 08322. As of the 2020 census, Franklinville had a population of 1,927.

The Franklinville area of Franklin Township serves as the town center that mixes historic buildings with modern conveniences and stores. A mix of merchants exist in the town center along with the Franklinville Volunteer Fire Company, Franklin Township Community Center and The Franklinville Inn, Franklinville Lake and the historic Franklinville train station. Franklinville was formerly named "Little Ease."

A five-way junction between New Jersey Route 47, County Route 538 and County Route 613 in the center of Franklinville provides access to Williamstown, Glassboro and Vineland.

== Demographics ==
Historical population
Census	Pop.	Note	%±
2020	1,927		—
U.S. Decennial Census; 2020

Franklinville first appeared as a census designated place in the 2020 U.S. census.

Franklinville CDP, New Jersey – Racial and ethnic composition Note: the US Census treats Hispanic/Latino as an ethnic category. This table excludes Latinos from the racial categories and assigns them to a separate category. Hispanics/Latinos may be of any race.
Race / Ethnicity (NH = Non-Hispanic)	Pop 2020	2020
White alone (NH)	1,597	82.87%
Black or African American alone (NH)	44	2.28%
Native American or Alaska Native alone (NH)	3	0.16%
Asian alone (NH)	13	0.67%
Native Hawaiian or Pacific Islander alone (NH)	0	0.00%
Other race alone (NH)	12	0.62%
Mixed race or Multiracial (NH)	104	5.40%
Hispanic or Latino (any race)	154	7.99%
Total	1,927	100.00%

== Education ==
The local school districts for the area is Franklin Township Public Schools (elementary) and Delsea Regional School District (secondary) with the latter operating Delsea Regional High School.

Guardian Angels Regional School is a K-8 school that operates under the auspices of the Roman Catholic Diocese of Camden and accepts students from Franklinville. Its PreK-3 campus is in Gibbstown while its 4-8 campus is in Paulsboro. Nativity Church in Franklinville is one of the sending parishes.

== Notable people ==
People who were born in, residents of, or otherwise closely associated with Franklinville include:

- James Broselow (1943–2025), emergency physician, inventor and entrepreneur, best known for inventing the Broselow tape
- Leonard H. Kaser (born 1931), lawyer and politician who represented the 3rd legislative district in the New Jersey General Assembly from 1968 to 1969
- Eliot Marshall (born 1980), retired mixed martial artist

== Wineries ==
- Coda Rossa Winery
- Tamuzza Vineyards
