= East Greenwich Township School District =

School district in Gloucester County, New Jersey, US

Address
- 535 Kings Highway Mickleton, Gloucester County, New Jersey, 08056; United States
- Coordinates: 39.788775°N 75.240632°W

District information
- Grades: Pre-K to 6
- Superintendent: Andrea Evans
- Business administrator: Greg Wilson
- Schools: 2

Students and staff
- Enrollment: 1,308 (as of 2020–21)
- Faculty: 110.2 FTEs
- Student–teacher ratio: 11.9:1

Other information
- District Factor Group: FG
- Website: www.eastgreenwich.k12.nj.us
Ind.	Per pupil	District spending	Rank (*)	K-6 average	%± vs. average
1A	Total Spending	$12,585	1	$18,891	−33.4%
1	Budgetary Cost	9,991	1	13,649	−26.8%
2	Classroom Instruction	6,120	2	8,366	−26.8%
6	Support Services	1,681	12	2,161	−22.2%
8	Administrative Cost	1,013	3	1,467	−30.9%
10	Operations & Maintenance	1,163	6	1,552	−25.1%
16	Median Teacher Salary	55,462	22	57,437
Data from NJDoE 2014 Taxpayers' Guide to Education Spending. *Of K-6 districts with any number of students. Lowest spending=1; Highest=59

The East Greenwich Township School District is a community public school district that serves students in pre-kindergarten through sixth grade from East Greenwich Township, in Gloucester County, in the U.S. state of New Jersey.

Based on data from the 2014 Taxpayers' Guide to Education Spending prepared by the New Jersey Department of Education, the East Greenwich district's total per pupil spending of $12,585 was the lowest of any regular school district.

As of the 2020–21 school year, the district, comprising two schools, had an enrollment of 1,308 students and 110.2 classroom teachers (on an FTE basis), for a student–teacher ratio of 11.9:1.

The district is classified by the New Jersey Department of Education as being in District Factor Group "FG", the fourth-highest of eight groupings. District Factor Groups organize districts statewide to allow comparison by common socioeconomic characteristics of the local districts. From lowest socioeconomic status to highest, the categories are A, B, CD, DE, FG, GH, I and J.

Public school students in seventh through twelfth grades are educated by the Kingsway Regional School District, which also serves students from South Harrison Township, Swedesboro and Woolwich Township, with the addition of students from Logan Township who attend as part of a sending/receiving relationship in which tuition is paid on a per-pupil basis by the Logan Township School District. As of the 2020–21 school year, the district's two schools had an enrollment of 2,544 students and 189.9 classroom teachers (on an FTE basis), for a student–teacher ratio of 13.4:1. Schools in the district (with 2020–21 enrollment data from the National Center for Education Statistics) are Kingsway Regional Middle School with 1,023 students in grades 7-8 and Kingsway Regional High School with 1,802 students in grades 9-12. Under a 2011 proposal, Kingsway would merge with its constituent member's K-6 districts to become a full K-12 district, with various options for including Logan Township as part of the consolidated district.

== Schools ==
The schools in the district (with 2020–21 enrollment data from the National Center for Education Statistics) are:

- Jeffrey Clark School located on Quaker Road with 575 students in Grades PreK-2
  - Jessica Loggia, Principal
- Samuel Mickle School located on Kings Highway with 728 students in Grades 3-6
  - Bethanne Barousse, principal

== Administration ==
Core members of the district's administration are:

- Andrea Evans, superintendent
- Greg Wilson, business administrator and board secretary

== Board of education ==
The district's board of education, composed of nine members, sets policy and oversees the fiscal and educational operation of the district through its administration. As a Type II school district, the board's trustees are elected directly by voters to serve three-year terms of office on a staggered basis, with three seats up for election each year held (since 2012) as part of the November general election. The board appoints a superintendent to oversee the district's day-to-day operations and a business administrator to supervise the business functions of the district.

Members of the districts's board of education are:

- Mark Schonewise, President
- Jodie O’Brien, Vice President
- Anand Acharya Esquire
- John Baird
- Lori Becker
- Jenny Cavalieri
- Krissy Christian
- Stephanie Cosentino
- Lynn Starks
