= Delsea Regional High School =

High school in Gloucester County, New Jersey, US

Location
- 242 Fries Mill Road; Franklinville, Gloucester County, New Jersey 08322; United States
- 39.608903°N 75.066702°W

Information
- Type: Public high school
- Established: 1960
- School district: Delsea Regional School District
- NCES School ID: 341545002630
- Principal: Michele DePasquale
- Faculty: 78.4 FTEs
- Enrollment: 1,048 (as of 2024–25)
- Student to teacher ratio: 13.4:1
- Colors: Scarlet and white
- Athletics conference: Tri-County Conference (general); West Jersey Football League (football)
- Team name: Crusaders
- Newspaper: The Delsonian
- Yearbook: Janus
- Website: highschool.delsearegional.us

Delsea Regional High School is a four-year comprehensive regional public high school that serves students in ninth through twelfth grade from Elk Township (feeding into Delsea from Aura Elementary School, which serves grades PreK–6) and Franklin Township (from Caroline L. Reutter, which serves grades 5–6), in Gloucester County, in the U.S. state of New Jersey, operating as part of the Delsea Regional School District. Students from Newfield attend the district's schools as part of a sending/receiving relationship begun in September 2010 after Newfield began a process to end its prior relationship with the Buena Regional School District. The school district gets its name from its location just off Delsea Drive, which runs from Westville on the Delaware River to Wildwood on the Jersey shore, hence the name Del-Sea.

As of the 2024–25 school year, the school had an enrollment of 1,048 students and 78.4 classroom teachers (on an FTE basis), for a student–teacher ratio of 13.4:1. There were 238 students (22.7% of enrollment) eligible for free lunch and 35 (3.3% of students) eligible for reduced-cost lunch.

== History ==
The Delsea Regional District was established and the high school opened in October 1960, before which high school students from Elk and Franklin Townships had attended Clayton Middle/High School. The district celebrated its 50th anniversary in 2010.

A report prepared in 2004 for the Franklin Township Public Schools considered the options of forming a consolidated, PreK–12, all-purpose regional district, establishing both Elk and Franklin Townships as separate PreK–12 districts and leaving the current situation unchanged. The report concluded that the greatest educational and financial benefits could be achieved through the creation of a consolidated PreK–12 district that would include all three existing districts.

== Awards, recognition and rankings ==
The school was the 233rd-ranked public high school in New Jersey out of 339 schools statewide in New Jersey Monthly magazine's September 2014 cover story on the state's "Top Public High Schools," using a new ranking methodology. The school had been ranked 235th in the state of 328 schools in 2012, after being ranked 246th in 2010 out of 322 schools listed. The magazine ranked the school 202nd in 2008 out of 316 schools. The school was ranked 230th in the magazine's September 2006 issue, which surveyed 316 schools across the state. Schooldigger.com ranked the school 193rd out of 381 public high schools statewide in its 2011 rankings (a decrease of 68 positions from the 2010 ranking) which were based on the combined percentage of students classified as proficient or above proficient on the two components of the High School Proficiency Assessment (HSPA), mathematics (81.1%) and language arts literacy (90.1%).

== Arts ==
Delsea Regional High School's Drama program has included The Little Mermaid (2017), The Wedding Singer (2016), Grease (2015), Shrek (2015), All Shook Up (2013), Legally Blonde (2012), Hairspray (2011), Annie (2010), Footloose (2009), The Wizard of Oz (2008), Beauty and the Beast (2007), Grease (2006), West Side Story (2005), Into the Woods (2004), My Fair Lady (2003), Oliver! (2002), Bye Bye Birdie (2001), and Annie (2000).

== Athletics ==
The Delsea Regional High School Crusaders compete as one of the member schools in the Tri-County Conference, which is comprised of public and private high schools located in Camden, Cape May, Cumberland, Gloucester and Salem counties. The conference is overseen by the New Jersey State Interscholastic Athletic Association (NJSIAA). With 783 students in grades 10–12, the school was classified by the NJSIAA for the 2019–20 school year as Group III for most athletic competition purposes, which included schools with an enrollment of 761 to 1,058 students in that grade range. The football team competes in the Independence Division of the 94-team West Jersey Football League superconference and was classified by the NJSIAA as Group III South for football for 2024–2026, which included schools with 695 to 882 students.

Delsea was recognized by the NJSIAA as Group III winner of the 2009-10 ShopRite Cup, achieving first-place finishes in girls cross-country, football, both girls and boys indoor relays, girls indoor track and field, girls outdoor track and field, second place boys outdoor track and field, third-place finishes in softball (tied) and boys indoor track and field, with the addition of three points awarded for having no disqualifications during the winter season. The NJSIAA recognized Delsea again in 2010-11 as winner of the ShopRite Cup for Group III, awarded for first-place finishes in indoor track & field relays for both boys and girls, indoor group track & field for both boys and girls, and in girls outdoor track & field, second in football, third in wrestling (tied) and fourth place in girls cross-country, along with six additional points for having no disqualifications for the winter and spring seasons.

The baseball team won the South Jersey Group II title in 1961 and the South Jersey Group I title in 1962. The team won the South Jersey Group III championship in 2005 with an 8–6 win against Lower Cape May Regional High School.

The football team won the South Jersey Group II state sectional championships in 1976, 1982, 1984, 1986, 2008 and 2009, in addition to winning in Group III in 1979, 2000, 2005, 2012-2015 and 2017. The 1976 team finished the season with an 11–0 record after winning the South Jersey Group II sectional title with a 14–6 victory against Pleasantville High School in the playoff finals. A late touchdown gave the 1982 team a 20–12 win against Salem High School in the South Jersey Group II sectional championship game and a 10–0–1 record for the season. A 22–6 win against Woodstown High School in the championship game gave the 1984 team the South Jersey Group II title and a 10–1 record, with Delsea's only loss of the season coming six weeks earlier against Woodstown. The 1986 team finished the season with a 10–1 record after winning the South Jersey Group II state sectional championship with a 16–13 win against Clearview Regional High School in the tournament final. Despite playing no home games all season, the team finished the 2000 season with a record of 11–1, defeating Ocean City High School by a score of 35–22 to win the South Jersey Group III championship at Rowan University. The 2005 football team won the South, Group III state sectional title with a 21–6 win against Lacey Township High School. The 2008 Football team won the South Jersey, Group II title with a win over West Deptford High School by a 17–14 margin, after entering the final quarter down by a touchdown, and scoring 10 points to take the lead, capped off by the winning field goal which was kicked as the game ended. The 2009 football team went 11–1, won the South Jersey Group II title with a 40–22 win over Haddonfield Memorial High School and set the South Jersey all-time scoring record for points in a season with 510, breaking the record of 506 that had been set by Paulsboro High School in 2001. The team won its fourth consecutive title in 2015 with a 21–12 win against Camden High School in the South Jersey Group III tournament final. The team won the South Jersey Group III sectional championship in 2017, the program's 14th championship, with a 29–28 win in the playoff finals against second-seeded Woodrow Wilson High School, giving Delsea Coach Sal Marchese his 200th career victory.

The wrestling team won the South Jersey Group II sectional title in 1984, 1985, 1989–1991, 2008, 2009 and 2011–2014, and won the South Jersey Group III title in 2002 and 2015–2020. The team won the Group II state championship in 1991 and the Group III title in 2015.

The boys' basketball team won the Group II state title in 1991, defeating runner-up Hillside High School in the finals of the tournament.

Delsea won the girls' Group III state soccer championship in 1993 with a win in the tournament final over Ramsey High School.

The 1994 girls' basketball team won the Group III state championship with a 53–42 victory against Morris Knolls High School in the final of the tournament. The team advanced to the Tournament of Champions as the number-five seed and defeated fourth-seeded Middle Township High School by a score of 52–46 in the quarterfinals and beat top-seed Linden High School 55–54 in the semifinals before falling by a score of 52–45 to third-seed Mount Saint Dominic Academy in the finals.

The girls' cross country team won the Group II state championships in 2009.

The girls team won the NJSIAA spring / outdoor track Group II title in 2010 and in Group III in 2011.

The boys' track team won the Group II indoor relay championships in 2010, 2011 and 2020. The girls track team won the Group II indoor title in 2010-2012 and 2014. The boys' track team won the South Jersey, Group III sectional championship in 2017.

The boys indoor / winter track team won the Group II state championship in 2011, 2018, 2020 and 2022.

The boys spring / outdoor track team won the state championship in Group III in 2018 and 2022, and won the Group II title in 2019.

== Administration ==
The school's principal is Michele DePasquale. Her administration team includes two assistant principals.

== Notable alumni ==
- Josh Awotunde (born 1995, class of 2013), world-ranked shot putter
- Keith Braxton (born 1997), basketball player
- James Broselow (1943–2025, class of 1961), emergency physician, inventor and entrepreneur, best known for inventing the Broselow tape
- Bryan Dobzanski (born 1995, class of 2014), baseball pitcher
- Eliot Marshall (born 1980), retired mixed martial artist
- Walter L. Stewart Jr. (born 1944, class of 1962), retired United States Army officer
