= Mickleton, New Jersey =

Populated places in Gloucester County, New Jersey, US

- Census-designated place
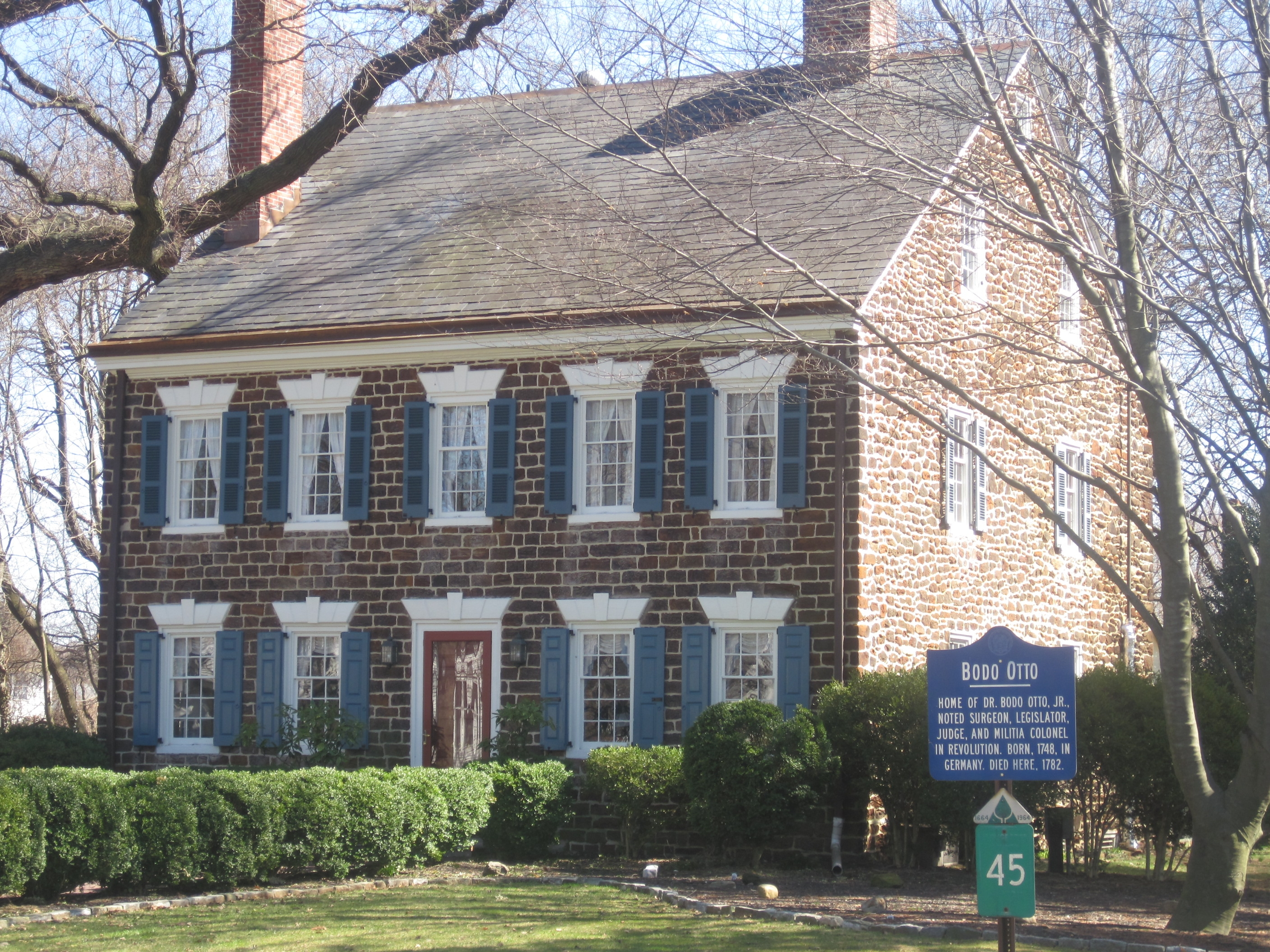
- Bodo Otto House

- Location in Gloucester County Location in New Jersey Location in the United States
- Coordinates: 39°47′24″N 75°14′16″W
- Country: United States
- State: New Jersey
- County: Gloucester
- Township: East Greenwich

Area
  - Total: 2.07 sq mi (5.37 km^{2})
  - Land: 2.04 sq mi (5.29 km^{2})
  - Water: 0.031 sq mi (0.08 km^{2})
- Elevation: 69 ft (21 m)

Population (2020)
  - Total: 2,285
  - Density: 1,118.3/sq mi (431.78/km^{2})
- ZIP Code: 08056
- FIPS code: 34-45780
- GNIS feature ID: 0878285

Mickleton is an unincorporated community and census-designated place located within East Greenwich Township in Gloucester County, in the U.S. state of New Jersey. The area is served as United States Postal Service ZIP Code 08056. As of the 2020 census, Mickleton had a population of 2,285.

Mickleton, along with the rest of East Greenwich, has experienced a major population boom.

Mickleton's Quaker roots can still be seen in its "Friend's Meeting House", a Quaker church, and in the "Little Red School House", a schoolhouse building from the 17th and 18th centuries.

== Transportation ==
The Swedesboro Railroad built its line from Woodbury to Swedesboro through the town, opening in October 1869 under lease to the West Jersey Railroad. It is still operated for freight traffic by the Southern Railroad of New Jersey.

== Demographics ==
Historical population
Census	Pop.	Note	%±
2020	2,285		—
U.S. Decennial Census; 2020

=== 2020 census ===
Mickleton was first listed as a census designated place in the 2020 U.S. census.

As of the 2020 census, Mickleton had a population of 2,285. The median age was 43.5 years. 24.0% of residents were under the age of 18 and 21.2% of residents were 65 years of age or older. For every 100 females there were 102.2 males, and for every 100 females age 18 and over there were 100.5 males age 18 and over.

94.3% of residents lived in urban areas, while 5.7% lived in rural areas.

There were 790 households in Mickleton, of which 37.1% had children under the age of 18 living in them. Of all households, 63.4% were married-couple households, 9.2% were households with a male householder and no spouse or partner present, and 22.3% were households with a female householder and no spouse or partner present. About 19.3% of all households were made up of individuals and 11.6% had someone living alone who was 65 years of age or older.

There were 818 housing units, of which 3.4% were vacant. The homeowner vacancy rate was 1.4% and the rental vacancy rate was 0.0%.

Mickleton CDP, New Jersey – Racial and ethnic composition Note: the US Census treats Hispanic/Latino as an ethnic category. This table excludes Latinos from the racial categories and assigns them to a separate category. Hispanics/Latinos may be of any race.
Race / Ethnicity (NH = Non-Hispanic)	Pop 2020	2020
White alone (NH)	1,977	86.52%
Black or African American alone (NH)	58	2.54%
Native American or Alaska Native alone (NH)	0	0.00%
Asian alone (NH)	60	2.63%
Native Hawaiian or Pacific Islander alone (NH)	0	0.00%
Other race alone (NH)	8	0.35%
Mixed race or Multiracial (NH)	113	4.95%
Hispanic or Latino (any race)	69	3.02%
Total	2,285	100.00%

== Education ==
East Greenwich Township School District serves grades K-6 with students in grades 7-12 served by Kingsway Regional School District.

Guardian Angels Regional School is a K-8 school that operates under the auspices of the Roman Catholic Diocese of Camden. Its PreK-3 campus is in Gibbstown while its 4-8 campus is in Paulsboro.

== Notable people ==
People who were born in, residents of, or otherwise closely associated with Mickleton include:

- Martin A. Herman (born 1939), politician who served in the New Jersey General Assembly, where he represented the 3rd Legislative District from 1974 to 1986, and was later appointed as a judge in New Jersey Superior Court in Gloucester County.
