= Franklin Township Public Schools =

Franklin Township Public Schools may refer to:

- Franklin Township Public Schools (Somerset County, New Jersey)
- Franklin Township Public Schools (Gloucester County, New Jersey)
