= National Park School District =

School district in Gloucester County, New Jersey, US

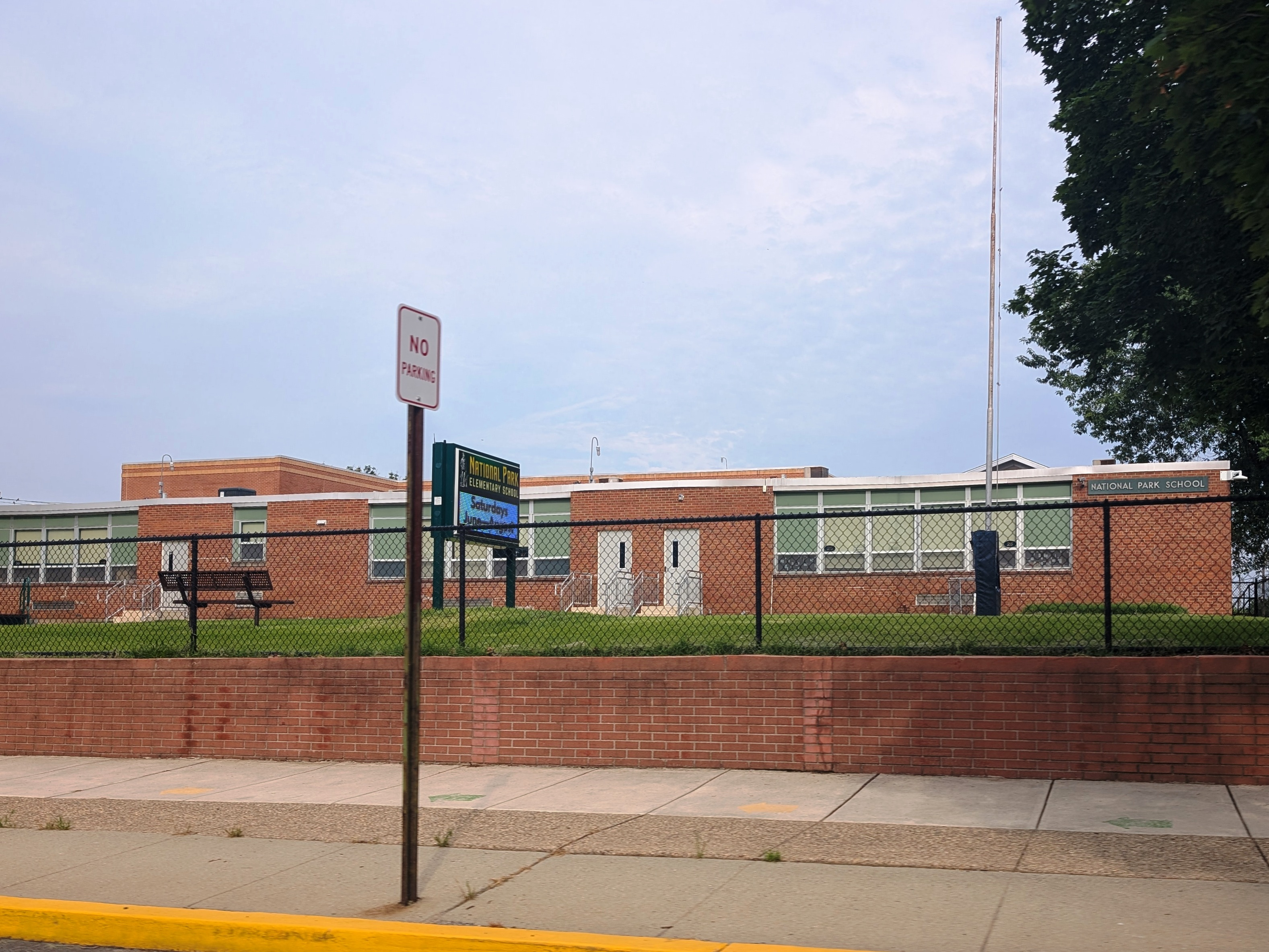
- National Park Elementary School, the only school in the district

Address
- 516 Lakehurst Avenue National Park, New Jersey, Gloucester County, New Jersey, New Jersey, 08063; United States
- Coordinates: 39.865589°N 75.182185°W

District information
- Grades: PreK-6
- Superintendent: Shannon Whalen
- Business administrator: Janice Grassia
- Schools: 1

Students and staff
- Enrollment: 294 (as of 2022–23)
- Faculty: 30.1 FTEs
- Student–teacher ratio: 9.8:1

Other information
- District Factor Group: B
- Website: www.npelem.com
Ind.	Per pupil	District spending	Rank (*)	K-6 average	%± vs. average
1A	Total Spending	$17,685	29	$18,891	−6.4%
1	Budgetary Cost	15,693	39	13,649	15.0%
2	Classroom Instruction	9,441	36	8,366	12.8%
6	Support Services	2,858	50	2,161	32.3%
8	Administrative Cost	1,569	27	1,467	7.0%
10	Operations & Maintenance	1,763	40	1,552	13.6%
13	Extracurricular Activities	36	21	39	−7.7%
16	Median Teacher Salary	70,249	57	57,437
Data from NJDoE 2014 Taxpayers' Guide to Education Spending. *Of K-6 districts with any number of students. Lowest spending=1; Highest=59

The National Park School District is a community public school district that serves students in pre-kindergarten through sixth grade from National Park, in Gloucester County, in the U.S. state of New Jersey.

As of the 2022–23 school year, the district, comprised of one school, had an enrollment of 294 students and 30.1 classroom teachers (on an FTE basis), for a student–teacher ratio of 9.8:1.

The district is classified by the New Jersey Department of Education as being in District Factor Group "B", the second lowest of eight groupings. District Factor Groups organize districts statewide to allow comparison by common socioeconomic characteristics of the local districts. From lowest socioeconomic status to highest, the categories are A, B, CD, DE, FG, GH, I and J.

For seventh through twelfth grade, public school students attend Gateway Regional High School, a regional public high school serving students from the boroughs of National Park, Wenonah, Westville and Woodbury Heights, as part of the Gateway Regional High School District. As of the 2021–22 school year, the high school had an enrollment of 836 students and 82.9 classroom teachers (on an FTE basis), for a student–teacher ratio of 10.1:1.

== School ==
National Park Elementary School served 290 students in grades PreK-6 as of the 2021–22 school year.

- Allison Thompson, principal.

== Administration ==
Core members of the district's administration are:

- Shannon Whalen, superintendent
- Janice Grassia, business administrator and board secretary

== Board of education ==
The district's board of education, comprised of nine members, sets policy and oversees the fiscal and educational operation of the district through its administration. As a Type II school district, the board's trustees are elected directly by voters to serve three-year terms of office on a staggered basis, with three seats up for election each year held (since 2012) as part of the November general election. The board appoints a superintendent to oversee the district's day-to-day operations and a business administrator to supervise the business functions of the district.
