= Paulsboro Public Schools =

School district in Gloucester County, New Jersey, US

Address
- 662 North Delaware Street Paulsboro, Gloucester County, New Jersey, 08066; United States
- Coordinates: 39.83722°N 75.24401°W

District information
- Grades: PreK-12
- Superintendent: Roy J. Dawson III
- Business administrator: Anisah Coppin
- Schools: 4

Students and staff
- Enrollment: 1,186 (as of 2020–21)
- Faculty: 101.0 FTEs
- Student–teacher ratio: 11.7:1

Other information
- District Factor Group: A
- Website: www.paulsboroschools.org
Ind.	Per pupil	District spending	Rank (*)	K-12 average	%± vs. average
1A	Total Spending	$19,580	35	$18,891	3.6%
1	Budgetary Cost	15,832	38	14,783	7.1%
2	Classroom Instruction	8,954	37	8,763	2.2%
6	Support Services	2,532	38	2,392	5.9%
8	Administrative Cost	1,826	36	1,485	23.0%
10	Operations & Maintenance	1,833	36	1,783	2.8%
13	Extracurricular Activities	666	43	268	148.5%
16	Median Teacher Salary	71,500	46	64,043
Data from NJDoE 2014 Taxpayers' Guide to Education Spending. *Of K-12 districts with up to 1,800 students. Lowest spending=1; Highest=49

The Paulsboro Public Schools is a comprehensive community public school district that serves students in pre-kindergarten through twelfth grade from Paulsboro, in Gloucester County, in the U.S. state of New Jersey.

As of the 2020–21 school year, the district, comprising four schools, had an enrollment of 1,186 students and 101.0 classroom teachers (on an FTE basis), for a student–teacher ratio of 11.7:1.

The district is classified by the New Jersey Department of Education as being in District Factor Group "A", the lowest of eight groupings. District Factor Groups organize districts statewide to allow comparison by common socioeconomic characteristics of the local districts. From lowest socioeconomic status to highest, the categories are A, B, CD, DE, FG, GH, I and J.

Students in ninth through twelfth grades from Greenwich Township attend the district's high school as part of a sending/receiving relationship with the Greenwich Township School District.

== Schools ==
Schools in the district (with 2020–21 enrollment data from the National Center for Education Statistics) are:

Elementary schools

- Billingsport Early Childhood Center with 304 students in grades PreK-2
  - Anthony Petrutz, principal
- Loudenslager Elementary School with 351 students in grades 3-6
  - Monica Moore-Cook, principal

Junior high school

- Paulsboro Junior High School with 131 students in grades 7-8
- Paulsboro High School with 351 students in grades 9-12
  - Matthew J. Browne, principal

== Administration ==
Core members of the district's administration are:

- Dr. Phil Neff, superintendent
- Douglas McGarry, business administrator and board secretary

== Board of education ==
The district's board of education is comprised of nine members who set policy and oversee the fiscal and educational operation of the district through its administration. As a Type II school district, the board's trustees are elected directly by voters to serve three-year terms of office on a staggered basis, with three seats up for election each year held (since 2013) as part of the November general election; a tenth member is appointed to represent the interests of the Greenwich Township district. The board appoints a superintendent to oversee the district's day-to-day operations and a business administrator to supervise the business functions of the district.
