= Woodbury Heights School District =

School district in Gloucester County, New Jersey, US

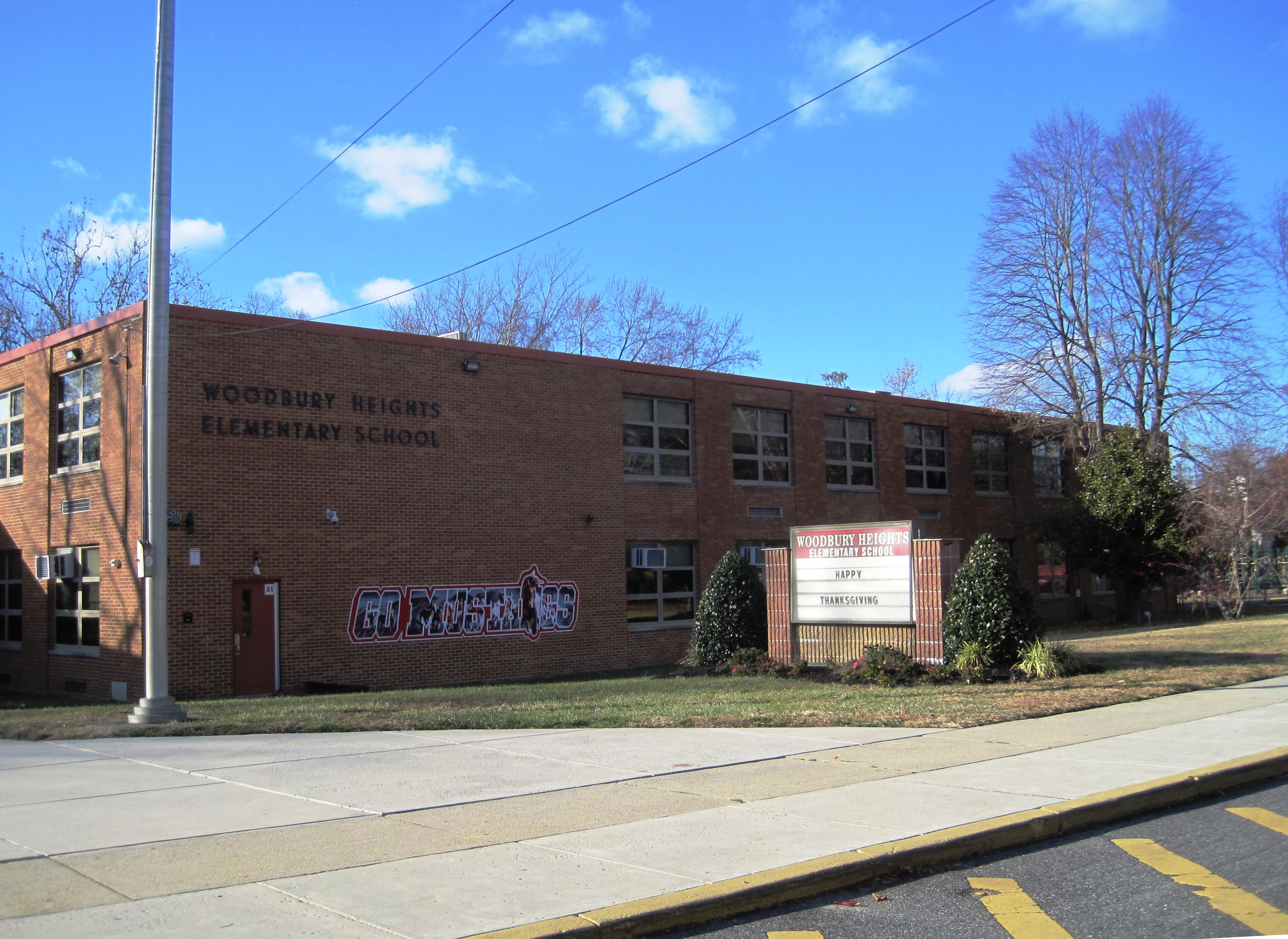
- Woodbury Heights Elementary School, the only school in the district

Address
- 100 Academy Avenue Woodbury Heights, Gloucester County, New Jersey, 08097
- Coordinates: 39.816449°N 75.150112°W

District information
- Grades: PreK-6
- Superintendent: Christopher M. Rodia
- Business administrator: Scott Campbell
- Schools: 1

Students and staff
- Enrollment: 261 (as of 2023–24)
- Faculty: 25.6 FTEs
- Student–teacher ratio: 10.2:1

Other information
- District Factor Group: FG
- Website: www.woodburyhtselem.com
Ind.	Per pupil	District spending	Rank (*)	K-6 average	%± vs. average
1A	Total Spending	$16,087	15	$18,891	−14.8%
1	Budgetary Cost	14,333	32	13,649	5.0%
2	Classroom Instruction	9,350	34	8,366	11.8%
6	Support Services	2,073	25	2,161	−4.1%
8	Administrative Cost	1,677	35	1,467	14.3%
10	Operations & Maintenance	1,182	7	1,552	−23.8%
13	Extracurricular Activities	53	27	39	35.9%
16	Median Teacher Salary	55,224	21	57,437
Data from NJDoE 2014 Taxpayers' Guide to Education Spending. *Of K-6 districts with any number of students. Lowest spending=1; Highest=59

The Woodbury Heights School District is a community public school district that serves students in pre-kindergarten through sixth grade from Woodbury Heights, in Gloucester County, in the U.S. state of New Jersey.

As of the 2023–24 school year, the district, comprised of one school, had an enrollment of 261 students and 25.6 classroom teachers (on an FTE basis), for a student–teacher ratio of 10.2:1.

The district had been classified by the New Jersey Department of Education as being in District Factor Group "FG", the fourth-highest of eight groupings. District Factor Groups organize districts statewide to allow comparison by common socioeconomic characteristics of the local districts. From the lowest socioeconomic status to the highest, the categories are A, B, CD, DE, FG, GH, I and J.

For seventh through twelfth grade, public school students attend Gateway Regional High School, a regional public high school established in 1964 that serves students from the boroughs of National Park, Wenonah, Westville and Woodbury Heights, as part of the Gateway Regional High School District. As of the 2023–24 school year, the high school had an enrollment of 875 students and 82.2 classroom teachers (on an FTE basis), for a student–teacher ratio of 10.6:1.

== School ==
Woodbury Heights Elementary School serves students in grades PreK–6. The school served 256 students as of the 2023–24 school year.

== Administration ==
Core members of the district's administration are:

- Christopher M. Rodia, chief school administrator
- Scott Campbell, business administrator and board secretary

== Board of education ==
The district's board of education, comprised of seven members, sets policy and oversees the fiscal and educational operation of the district through its administration. As a Type II school district, the board's trustees are elected directly by voters to serve three-year terms of office on a staggered basis, with either two or three seats up for election each year held (since 2012) as part of the November general election. The board appoints a superintendent to oversee the district's day-to-day operations and a business administrator to supervise the business functions of the district.
