= Wenonah School District =

School district in Gloucester County, New Jersey, US

Address
- 200 North Clinton Avenue Wenonah, Gloucester County, New Jersey, 08090; United States
- Coordinates: 39.794299°N 75.149185°W

District information
- Grades: K-6
- Superintendent: Kristine Height
- Business administrator: Michelle Jankauskas (interim)
- Schools: 1

Students and staff
- Enrollment: 163 (as of 2023–24)
- Faculty: 19.5 FTEs
- Student–teacher ratio: 8.4:1

Other information
- District Factor Group: I
- Website: District website
Ind.	Per pupil	District spending	Rank (*)	K-6 average	%± vs. average
1A	Total Spending	$14,424	3	$18,891	−23.6%
1	Budgetary Cost	11,548	8	13,649	−15.4%
2	Classroom Instruction	7,780	11	8,366	−7.0%
6	Support Services	1,364	3	2,161	−36.9%
8	Administrative Cost	1,294	11	1,467	−11.8%
10	Operations & Maintenance	1,068	3	1,552	−31.2%
13	Extracurricular Activities	42	24	39	7.7%
16	Median Teacher Salary	58,589	32	57,437
Data from NJDoE 2014 Taxpayers' Guide to Education Spending. *Of K-6 districts with any number of students. Lowest spending=1; Highest=59

The Wenonah School District is a community public school district that serves students in preschool through sixth grade from Wenonah, in Gloucester County, in the U.S. state of New Jersey.

As of the 2023–24 school year, the district, comprised of one school, had an enrollment of 163 students and 19.5 classroom teachers (on an FTE basis), for a student–teacher ratio of 8.4:1.

For seventh through twelfth grades, public school students attend Gateway Regional High School, a regional public high school that also serves students from the boroughs of National Park, Westville and Woodbury Heights, as part of the Gateway Regional High School District. As of the 2023–24 school year, the high school had an enrollment of 875 students and 82.2 classroom teachers (on an FTE basis), for a student–teacher ratio of 10.6:1.

== History ==
In the 2016–17 school year, Wenonah had the 37th smallest enrollment of any school district in the state, with 177 students.

The district had been classified by the New Jersey Department of Education as being in District Factor Group "I", the second-highest of eight groupings. District Factor Groups organize districts statewide to allow comparison by common socioeconomic characteristics of the local districts. From lowest socioeconomic status to highest, the categories are A, B, CD, DE, FG, GH, I and J.

== School ==
Wenonah Elementary School served an enrollment of 162 students in grades PreK-6 for the 2023–24 school year.

== Administration ==
Core members of the district's administration are:

- Kristine Height, chief school administrator
- Michelle Jankauskas, interim business administrator and board secretary

== Board of education ==
The district's board of education, composed of nine members, sets policy and oversees the fiscal and educational operation of the district through its administration. As a Type II school district, the board's trustees are elected directly by voters to serve three-year terms of office on a staggered basis, with three seats up for election each year held (since 2012) as part of the November general election. The board appoints a superintendent to oversee the district's day-to-day operations and a business administrator to supervise the business functions of the district.
