= Gloucester County Special Services School District =

Special education public school district in New Jersey

Gloucester County Special Services District

Address
- 1340 Tanyard Road Sewell, Gloucester County, New Jersey, 08080; United States
- Coordinates: 39.791965°N 75.125290°W

District information
- Grades: PreK-12
- Superintendent: James H. Dundee Jr.
- Business administrator: Christopher Retzbach
- Schools: 1

Students and staff
- Enrollment: 521 (as of 2022–23)
- Faculty: 95.5 FTEs
- Student–teacher ratio: 5.5:1

Other information
- Website: www.gcsssd.org
Ind.	Per pupil	District spending	Rank (*)	Special svcs. average	%± vs. average
1A	Total Spending	$49,515	3	$18,891	162.1%
1	Budgetary Cost	41,648	2	57,252	−27.3%
2	Classroom Instruction	23,057	2	32,861	−29.8%
6	Support Services	9,345	3	11,945	−21.8%
8	Administrative Cost	3,729	1	5,725	−34.9%
10	Operations & Maintenance	5,327	5	6,215	−14.3%
13	Extracurricular Activities	179	2	195	−8.2%
Data from NJDoE 2014 Taxpayers' Guide to Education Spending. *Of Special svcs. districts with any number of students. Lowest spending=1; Highest=8

The Gloucester County Special Services School District is a special education public school district headquartered in the Sewell section of Deptford Township, in Gloucester County, in the U.S. state of New Jersey. Its schools offer educational and therapeutic services for students of elementary and high school age in Gloucester County who have emotional or physical disabilities that cannot be addressed by their school districts.

As of the 2022–23 school year, the district, comprised of one school, had an enrollment of 521 students and 95.5 classroom teachers (on an FTE basis), for a student–teacher ratio of 5.5:1.

== Schools ==
Schools in the district (with 2022–23 enrollment data from the National Center for Education Statistics) are:

- Bankbridge Elementary School (grades preschool to 6)
  - Ronald Rutter, principal
- Bankbridge Regional School (grades 6-12; with 521 students combined across programs)
  - Ronald Rutter, principal

== Administration ==
Core members of the district's administration are:

- James H. Dundee Jr., superintendent
- Christopher Retzbach, business administrator and board secretary

== Board of education ==
The district's board of education, comprised of seven members, sets policy and oversees the fiscal and educational operation of the district through its administration. The county executive superintendent serves as a member, with six other members appointed by the director of the Board of County Commissioners to three-year terms on a staggered basis, with two terms up for reappointment each year. The board appoints a superintendent to oversee the district's day-to-day operations and a business administrator to supervise the business functions of the district.
