= Westville School District =

School district in Gloucester County, New Jersey, US

Address
- 101 Birch Street Westville, Gloucester County, New Jersey, 08093; United States
- Coordinates: 39.866482°N 75.127785°W

District information
- Grades: PreK to 6
- Superintendent: Shannon Whalen
- Business administrator: Janice Grassia
- Schools: 1

Students and staff
- Enrollment: 367 (as of 2023–24)
- Faculty: 36.9 FTEs
- Student–teacher ratio: 10.0:1

Other information
- District Factor Group: B
- Website: www.westvillesd.com
Ind.	Per pupil	District spending	Rank (*)	K-6 average	%± vs. average
1A	Total Spending	$16,213	16	$18,891	−14.2%
1	Budgetary Cost	13,975	25	13,649	2.4%
2	Classroom Instruction	9,318	33	8,366	11.4%
6	Support Services	1,987	21	2,161	−8.1%
8	Administrative Cost	1,355	19	1,467	−7.6%
10	Operations & Maintenance	1,236	9	1,552	−20.4%
13	Extracurricular Activities	79	33	39	102.6%
16	Median Teacher Salary	65,915	53	57,437
Data from NJDoE 2014 Taxpayers' Guide to Education Spending. *Of K-6 districts with any number of students. Lowest spending=1; Highest=59

The Westville School District is a community public school district that serves students in pre-kindergarten through sixth grade from Westville, in Gloucester County, in the U.S. state of New Jersey.

As of the 2023–24 school year, the district, comprised of one school, had an enrollment of 367 students and 36.9 classroom teachers (on an FTE basis), for a student–teacher ratio of 10.0:1.

The district had been classified by the New Jersey Department of Education as being in District Factor Group "B", the second lowest of eight groupings. District Factor Groups organize districts statewide to allow comparison by common socioeconomic characteristics of the local districts. From lowest socioeconomic status to highest, the categories are A, B, CD, DE, FG, GH, I and J.

For seventh through twelfth grade, public school students attend Gateway Regional High School, a regional public high school that also serves students from the boroughs of National Park, Wenonah and Woodbury Heights, as part of the Gateway Regional High School District. As of the 2023–24 school year, the high school had an enrollment of 875 students and 82.2 classroom teachers (on an FTE basis), for a student–teacher ratio of 10.6:1.

== School ==
The district serves students in grades PreK–6 at Parkview Elementary School. The school served 362 students as of the 2023–24 school year.

- Brian Dericks, principal

== Administration ==
Core members of the district's administration are:

- Shannon Whalen, superintendent
- Janice Grassia, business administrator and board secretary

== Board of education ==
The district's board of education, comprised of nine members, sets policy and oversees the fiscal and educational operation of the district through its administration. As a Type II school district, the board's trustees are elected directly by voters to serve three-year terms of office on a staggered basis, with three seats up for election each year held (since 2012) as part of the November general election. The board appoints a superintendent to oversee the district's day-to-day operations and a business administrator to supervise the business functions of the district.
