= Swedesboro High School =

Former school in New Jersey, United States

Swedesboro High School was a public high school serving students in ninth through twelfth grade in Swedesboro, in Gloucester County, in the U.S. state of New Jersey. The school was operated by the Swedesboro-Woolwich School District starting in 1923. The school closed in June 1963 in advance of the opening of Kingsway Regional High School the following September.

The school was constructed in 1923 at a cost of $233,000 (equivalent to $4.4 million in 2025), and was described by the county superintendent as the "costliest school in the county". The school served students from Swedesboro and Woolwich Township, while students from East Greenwich Township and Logan Township attended as part of sending/receiving relationships. The school offered a curriculum that also included agricultural education. The school closed in June 1963, in advance of the opening of the new Kingsway Regional High School.

== Notable alumni ==
- Earl Rapp (1921–1992), professional baseball outfielder and scout, who played in MLB for the Detroit Tigers, Chicago White Sox, New York Giants, St. Louis Browns and Washington Senators.
