= Greenwich Township School District (Gloucester County, New Jersey) =

School district in Gloucester County, New Jersey, US

Address
- 415 Swedesboro Road Gibbstown, Gloucester County, New Jersey, 08027; United States
- Coordinates: 39.818194°N 75.265119°W

District information
- Grades: K-8
- Superintendent: Jennifer M. Foley
- Business administrator: Scott A. Campbell
- Schools: 2

Students and staff
- Enrollment: 421 (as of 2021–22)
- Faculty: 43.0 FTEs
- Student–teacher ratio: 9.8:1

Other information
- District Factor Group: DE
- Website: www.gtsdk8.us
Ind.	Per pupil	District spending	Rank (*)	K-8 average	%± vs. average
1A	Total Spending	$19,111	39	$18,891	1.2%
1	Budgetary Cost	17,980	60	14,159	27.0%
2	Classroom Instruction	10,142	55	8,659	17.1%
6	Support Services	3,396	60	2,167	56.7%
8	Administrative Cost	1,742	36	1,547	12.6%
10	Operations & Maintenance	2,642	63	1,612	63.9%
13	Extracurricular Activities	37	6	104	−64.4%
16	Median Teacher Salary	58,137	24	61,136
Data from NJDoE 2014 Taxpayers' Guide to Education Spending. *Of K-8 districts with 401-750 students. Lowest spending=1; Highest=64

The Greenwich Township School District is a community public school district that serves students in kindergarten through eighth grade from Greenwich Township, in Gloucester County, in the U.S. state of New Jersey.

As of the 2021–22 school year, the district, comprising two schools, had an enrollment of 421 students and 43.0 classroom teachers (on an FTE basis), for a student–teacher ratio of 9.8:1.

The district is classified by the New Jersey Department of Education as being in District Factor Group "DE", the fifth-highest of eight groupings. District Factor Groups organize districts statewide to allow comparison by common socioeconomic characteristics of the local districts. From lowest socioeconomic status to highest, the categories are A, B, CD, DE, FG, GH, I and J.

Public school students in ninth through twelfth grades attend Paulsboro High School in Paulsboro as part of a sending/receiving relationship with the Paulsboro Public Schools. As of the 2021–22 school year, the high school had an enrollment of 359 students and 30.6 classroom teachers (on an FTE basis), for a student–teacher ratio of 11.7:1.

== Schools ==
Schools in the district (with 2024–25 enrollment data from the National Center for Education Statistics) are:

Elementary school

- Broad Street Elementary School with 290 students in grades K-5
  - Alisa Whitcraft, principal

Middle school

- Nehaunsey Middle School with 137 students in grades 6-8
  - Ryan Hudson, principal

== Administration ==
Core members of the district's administration are:

- Ryan Hudson, superintendent
- Scott A. Campbell, business administrator and board secretary

== Board of education ==
The district's board of education, comprised of seven members, sets policy and oversees the fiscal and educational operation of the district through its administration. As a Type II school district, the board's trustees are elected directly by voters to serve three-year terms of office on a staggered basis, with either two or three seats up for election each year held (since 2013) as part of the November general election. The board appoints a superintendent to oversee the district's day-to-day operations and a business administrator to supervise the business functions of the district.
