= Delsea Regional School District =

School district in Gloucester County, New Jersey, US

Address
- 242 Fries Mill Road Franklinville, Gloucester County, New Jersey, 08322; United States
- Coordinates: 39.655002°N 75.055384°W

District information
- Grades: 7-12
- Superintendent: Fran Ciociola
- Business administrator: Joseph Collins
- Schools: 2

Students and staff
- Enrollment: 1,632 (as of 2023–24)
- Faculty: 126.4 FTEs
- Student–teacher ratio: 12.9:1

Other information
- District Factor Group: CD
- Website: delsearegional.us
Ind.	Per pupil	District spending	Rank (*)	7-12 average	%± vs. average
1A	Total Spending	$18,540	8	$18,891	−1.9%
1	Budgetary Cost	12,652	4	14,586	−13.3%
2	Classroom Instruction	6,970	3	8,339	−16.4%
6	Support Services	2,112	17	2,114	−0.1%
8	Administrative Cost	1,165	1	1,561	−25.4%
10	Operations & Maintenance	1,642	10	1,798	−8.7%
13	Extracurricular Activities	444	2	673	−34.0%
16	Median Teacher Salary	70,939	30	65,769
Data from NJDoE 2014 Taxpayers' Guide to Education Spending. *Of 7-12 districts with any number of students. Lowest spending=1; Highest=47

The Delsea Regional School District is a regional public school district serving students in seventh through twelfth grades from Elk Township and Franklin Township, two constituent communities in Gloucester County, in the U.S. state of New Jersey. Students from Newfield attend the district's schools as part of a sending/receiving relationship begun in September 2010 after Newfield ended its prior relationship with the Buena Regional School District.

As of the 2023–24 school year, the district, comprised of two schools, had an enrollment of 1,632 students and 126.4 classroom teachers (on an FTE basis), for a student–teacher ratio of 12.9:1.

The district participates in the Interdistrict Public School Choice Program, which allows non-resident students to attend school in the district at no cost to their parents, with tuition covered by the resident district. Available slots are announced annually by grade.

== History ==
In September 1957, the New Jersey Department of Education approved a study for a regional high school district in southern Gloucester County covering Clayton, Elk Township and Franklin Township. At the time, high school students from Elk Township had attended Glassboro High School as part of a sending/receiving relationship with the Glassboro Public Schools, while those from Franklin township had attended Clayton High School as part of an agreement with the Clayton Public Schools, with students experiencing overcrowding at both schools.

The Delsea Regional District was established and the high school opened in October 1960. The district celebrated its 50th anniversary in 2010.

The New Jersey Department of Education considered a vote by the Franklin Township Board of Education in June 2010 requesting that the district withdraw from the Delsea Regional School District, which would require that the Delsea region be dissolved as about 80% of the regional district's students come from Franklin. With the withdrawal of Franklin Township, two options being considered were to either have Franklin and Elk Townships create a new regional district with Newfield students attending on a send-receive basis, or having Franklin Township establish its own PreK-12 district which would receive students from both Elk Township and Newfield.

The district had been classified by the New Jersey Department of Education as being in District Factor Group "CD." District Factor Groups organize districts statewide to allow comparison by common socioeconomic characteristics of the local districts. From lowest socioeconomic status to highest, the categories are A, B, CD, DE, FG, GH, I and J.

== Schools ==
Schools in the district (with 2023–24 enrollment data from the National Center for Education Statistics) are:

- Delsea Regional Middle School with 497 students in grades 7 and 8
  - John Bertolino, principal
- Delsea Regional High School with 1,090 students in grades 9–12
  - Michele DePasquale, principal

== Administration ==
Core members of the district's administration are:

- Fran Ciociola, superintendent
- Joseph Collins, business administrator and board secretary

== Board of education ==
The district's board of education, comprised of nine members, sets policy and oversees the fiscal and educational operation of the district through its administration. As a Type II school district, the board's trustees are elected directly by voters to serve three-year terms of office on a staggered basis, with three seats up for election each year held (since 2014) as part of the November general election. The board appoints a superintendent to oversee the district's day-to-day operations and a business administrator to supervise the business functions of the district. The seats on the board of education are allocated to the constituent municipalities based on population, with seven seats assigned to Franklin Township and two to Elk Township.
