= Clearview Regional High School =

Public school in New Jersey, US

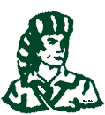

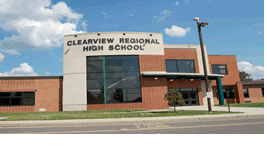

Location
- 625 Breakneck Road; Mullica Hill, Gloucester County, New Jersey 08062; United States
- 39.752043°N 75.208976°W

Information
- Type: Public high school
- Established: September 1960
- NCES School ID: 340321002506
- Principal: Thomas Jones
- Faculty: 87.5 FTEs
- Enrollment: 1,332 (as of 2024–25)
- Student to teacher ratio: 15.2:1
- Colors: Forest green and gold
- Athletics conference: Tri-County Conference (general); West Jersey Football League (football)
- Team name: Pioneers
- Rival: Kingsway Regional High School
- Website: hs.clearviewregional.edu

Clearview Regional High School is a regional public high school serving students in ninth through twelfth grades from Harrison Township and Mantua Township, two communities in Gloucester County, in the U.S. state of New Jersey, operating as part of the Clearview Regional High School District.

As of the 2024–25 school year, the school had an enrollment of 1,332 students and 87.5 classroom teachers (on an FTE basis), for a student–teacher ratio of 15.2:1. There were 207 students (15.5% of enrollment) eligible for free lunch and 33 (2.5% of students) eligible for reduced-cost lunch.

== History ==
Constructed on an 80-acre (32 ha) site at a cost of $1.5 million (equivalent to $16.6 million in 2025), the school opened in September 1960, with 950 students in seventh through tenth grades. Students from Mantua Township had attended Pitman High School as part of a sending/receiving relationship, while students from Harrison Township were sent on a tuition-basis to Glassboro High School.

== Awards, recognition and rankings ==
The school was the 109th-ranked public high school in New Jersey out of 339 schools statewide in New Jersey Monthly magazine's September 2014 cover story on the state's "Top Public High Schools", using a new ranking methodology. The school had been ranked 144th in the state of 328 schools in 2012, after being ranked 142nd in 2010 out of 322 schools listed. The magazine ranked the school 130th in 2008 out of 316 schools. The school was ranked 141st in the magazine's September 2006 issue, which surveyed 316 schools across the state.

Schooldigger.com ranked the school tied for 106th out of 381 public high schools statewide in its 2011 rankings (an increase of 8 positions from the 2010 ranking) which were based on the combined percentage of students classified as proficient or above proficient on the mathematics (85.2%) and language arts literacy (97.5%) components of the High School Proficiency Assessment (HSPA).

== Curriculum ==
The school has articulation agreement with Rowan College at Gloucester County under which students can earn credit at both the high school and college level for 15 courses offered by Clearview, such as AP Government and AP Calculus.

All courses are meant to fulfill New Jersey's Common Core Standards.

== Athletics ==
The Clearview Regional High School Pioneers compete as one of the member schools in the Tri-County Conference, which is comprised of public and private high schools located in Camden, Cape May, Cumberland, Gloucester and Salem counties. The conference is overseen by the New Jersey State Interscholastic Athletic Association (NJSIAA). With 1,104 students in grades 10–12, the school was classified by the NJSIAA for the 2019–20 school year as Group IV for most athletic competition purposes, which included schools with an enrollment of 1,060 to 5,049 students in that grade range. The football team competes in the Continental Division of the 94-team West Jersey Football League superconference and was classified by the NJSIAA as Group IV South for football for 2024–2026, which included schools with 890 to 1,298 students.

Kingsway Regional High School is Clearview's athletic rival, with the football teams from the two schools competing against each other on Thanksgiving Day for the Coaches Trophy.

The boys spring track team won the state championship in Group II in 1966 and 1968.

The boys track team was state Group I-II indoor relay co-champion in 1966.

The girls team won the NJSIAA spring track Group II title in 1990–1992.

The 1998 softball team finished the season with a record of 16-9 after winning the Group III state championship, having defeated Passaic Valley Regional High School by a score of 7–2 in the final game of the tournament. The team won the 2002 South, Group III sectional championship with a 5–3 win over Toms River High School South in the tournament final. The team repeated as winner of the sectional title in 2003, edging Cumberland Regional High School by a score of 4–3.

The wrestling team won the South Jersey Group III sectional title in 2014-2016 and won the Group III state championship in 2014. Ty Whalen won the NJSIAA 132-lb individual state wrestling tournament in 2021, becoming the fourth Clearview wrestler to win a state title.

In 2016, the baseball team won the South Jersey Group IV sectional championship, defeating Millville High School by a score of 3–0 in the tournament final.

The field hockey team won the South Jersey Group III state sectional championship in 2017 and 2019, and won the Group III state title in 2019 and 2023–2025. The program won its first Group III state title in 2019, defeating runner-up Warren Hills Regional High School by a score of 2–1 in the championship game.

Clearview participates in the South Jersey High School Ice Hockey League, a high school ice hockey league with 16 teams participating at the varsity level from South Jersey. The girls' soccer team were co-champions in the Tri-County Conference in 2004 and were champions in the 2008 and 2009 season. The girls also made appearances in the finals of the South Jersey state playoffs in 2005 and 2008. Clearview's golf team won the Tri-County Conference in 2008 and 2009. The football team went undefeated in the regular season in 1972 and 2006. The girls' varsity swim team won Tri-County Conference Championship titles in 2005, 2006, 2007, 2008 and 2010.

== Marching band ==
The Clearview Regional Marching Band was Tournament of the Bands Chapter One Champions in 1975, 1993-1994 (Group 2) and 1995-1997 (Group 3). The Clearview Band was recognized as the Atlantic Coast Champion in Group 3 in 1995.

The 2008 show was entitled "Shapes". The Clearview Regional Marching Band was crowned the 2008 USSBA New Jersey State champions (group II) on October 26, 2008, in Union, NJ. The competition was originally scheduled to be held on the 25th at Giants Stadium, but was rained out and rescheduled to the following day at Union High School.

In November 2008, the Clearview Regional Marching Band took 2nd place for Group II at the USSBA National Championships held at the United States Naval Academy in Annapolis, Maryland. The Percussion Section also received the award for "Best Percussion Award" in Group II.

The 2009 show was entitled "Tragic Kingdom: The Rise and Fall of Babylon 2009", and was written by the Marching Band Director, Calvin Spencer. The Percussion was written by former assistant director, Ron Latham. The Clearview Regional Marching Band finished 2nd in Group I at the USSBA New Jersey state championships. The band placed 3rd at the Northern States Championships and placed 4th at the USSBA National Championships. The Percussion Section received the "Best Percussion Award" for Group I. This was the second straight year that the Clearview Percussion Section won this award.

The 2014 show was entitled "Goddess of Fire". The band placed 2nd in the Tournament of Bands (ToB) New Jersey state championships, and also placed 1st in the ToB Chapter One South Jersey Championship. The band also placed 2nd in the ToB Atlantic Coast Championships in Hershey, Pennsylvania.

== Administration ==
The school's principal is Thomas Jones. His core administration team includes three assistant principals.

== Notable alumni ==
- John Brancy (born 1988, class of 2007), Grammy Award-winning operatic baritone
- Jeff Datz (born 1959), professional baseball scout and a former Major League Baseball player and coach
- Richard Newbill (born 1968), former NFL linebacker who played with the Minnesota Vikings and Seattle Seahawks
- Michelle Tumolo (born 1991), women's lacrosse coach and former player who has been the head coach of the Army Black Knights women's lacrosse team
