= Franklin Township Public Schools (Gloucester County, New Jersey) =

School district in Gloucester County, New Jersey, US

Address
- 3228 Coles Mill Road Franklin Township, Gloucester County, New Jersey, 08322; United States
- Coordinates: 39.619665°N 75.018811°W

District information
- Grades: PreK-6
- Superintendent: Brian Betze (interim)
- Business administrator: Trish Birmingham
- Schools: 3

Students and staff
- Enrollment: 1,338 (as of 2022–23)
- Faculty: 116.2 FTEs
- Student–teacher ratio: 11.5:1

Other information
- District Factor Group: CD
- Website: www.franklintwpschools.org
Ind.	Per pupil	District spending	Rank (*)	K-6 average	%± vs. average
1A	Total Spending	$16,401	19	$18,891	−13.2%
1	Budgetary Cost	12,229	9	13,649	−10.4%
2	Classroom Instruction	7,355	7	8,366	−12.1%
6	Support Services	1,618	10	2,161	−25.1%
8	Administrative Cost	1,350	17	1,467	−8.0%
10	Operations & Maintenance	1,668	36	1,552	7.5%
13	Extracurricular Activities	15	11	39	−61.5%
16	Median Teacher Salary	52,013	12	57,437
Data from NJDoE 2014 Taxpayers' Guide to Education Spending. *Of K-6 districts with any number of students. Lowest spending=1; Highest=59

The Franklin Township Public Schools are a community public school district that serves students in pre-kindergarten through sixth grade from Franklin Township, in Gloucester County, in the U.S. state of New Jersey.

As of the 2022–23 school year, the district, comprising three schools, had an enrollment of 1,338 students and 116.2 classroom teachers (on an FTE basis), for a student–teacher ratio of 11.5:1.

Students in public school from Newfield attend the Franklin Township district's schools as part of a sending/receiving relationship in which Newfield accounts for about 100 of the nearly 1,400 students in the district.

For seventh through twelfth grades, students attend the Delsea Regional School District, which serves students from both Elk Township and Franklin Township. Students from Newfield attend the district's schools as part of a sending/receiving relationship begun in September 2010 after Newfield ended its prior relationship with the Buena Regional School District. Schools in the district (with 2022–23 enrollment data from the National Center for Education Statistics) are Delsea Regional Middle School with 518 students in grades 7-8 and Delsea Regional High School with 1,074 students in grades 9-12.

== History ==
Students from Franklin township had attended Clayton High School as part of a sending/receiving relationship with the Clayton Public Schools, until Delsea Regional High School opened for the 1960–61 school year..

The New Jersey Department of Education considered a vote by the Franklin Township Board of Education in June 2010 requesting that the district withdraw from the Delsea Regional School District, which would require that the Delsea region be dissolved as about 80% of the regional district's students come from Franklin. With the withdrawal of Franklin Township, two options being considered were to either have Franklin and Elk Townships create a new regional district with Newfield students attending on a send-receive basis, or having Franklin Township establish its own PreK-12 district which would receive students from both Elk Township and Newfield.

The district had been classified by the New Jersey Department of Education as being in District Factor Group "CD", the sixth-highest of eight groupings. District Factor Groups organize districts statewide to allow comparison by common socioeconomic characteristics of the local districts. From lowest socioeconomic status to highest, the categories are A, B, CD, DE, FG, GH, I and J.

== Schools ==
Schools in the district (with 2022–23 enrollment data from the National Center for Education Statistics) are:

- Mary F. Janvier School with 555 students in grades K-2
  - Henry N. Kobik, principal
- Main Road School with 392 students in grades 3-4
  - Nicole Inverso, principal
- Caroline L. Reutter School with 379 students in grades 5-6
  - Ted Peters, principal

== Administration ==
Core members of the district's administration are:

- Brian Betze, interim superintendent of schools
- Trish Birmingham, business administrator and board secretary

== Board of education ==
The district's board of education, composed of nine members, sets policy and oversees the fiscal and educational operation of the district through its administration. As a Type II school district, the board's trustees are elected directly by voters to serve three-year terms of office on a staggered basis, with three seats up for election each year held (since 2014) as part of the November general election. The board appoints a superintendent to oversee the district's day-to-day operations and a business administrator to supervise the business functions of the district.
