= Clearview Regional High School District =

School district in Gloucester County, New Jersey, US

Address
- 420 Cedar Road Mullica Hill, Gloucester County, New Jersey, 08062; United States
- Coordinates: 39.748862°N 75.209249°W

District information
- Grades: 7-12
- Superintendent: John Horchak III
- Business administrator: Esther R. Pennell
- Schools: 2

Students and staff
- Enrollment: 2,120 (as of 2023–24)
- Faculty: 157.8 FTEs
- Student–teacher ratio: 13.4:1

Other information
- District Factor Group: GH
- Website: www.clearviewregional.edu
Ind.	Per pupil	District spending	Rank (*)	7-12 average	%± vs. average
1A	Total Spending	$15,959	2	$18,891	−15.5%
1	Budgetary Cost	11,360	2	14,586	−22.1%
2	Classroom Instruction	6,661	2	8,339	−20.1%
6	Support Services	1,445	3	2,114	−31.6%
8	Administrative Cost	1,336	4	1,561	−14.4%
10	Operations & Maintenance	1,334	4	1,798	−25.8%
13	Extracurricular Activities	487	3	673	−27.6%
16	Median Teacher Salary	62,125	12	65,769
Data from NJDoE 2014 Taxpayers' Guide to Education Spending. *Of 7-12 districts with any number of students. Lowest spending=1; Highest=47

Clearview Regional High School District is a regional public school district serving students in seventh through twelfth grades from the constituent districts of Harrison Township and Mantua Township, two communities in Gloucester County, in the U.S. state of New Jersey.

As of the 2023–24 school year, the district, comprised of two schools, had an enrollment of 2,120 students and 157.8 classroom teachers (on an FTE basis), for a student–teacher ratio of 13.4:1.

The district had been classified by the New Jersey Department of Education as being in District Factor Group "GH", the third-highest of eight groupings. District Factor Groups organize districts statewide to allow comparison by common socioeconomic characteristics of the local districts. From lowest socioeconomic status to highest, the categories are A, B, CD, DE, FG, GH, I and J.

== History ==
Constructed on an 80-acre (32 ha) site at a cost of $1.5 million (equivalent to $16.6 million in 2025), the district's initial high school facility opened in September 1960, with 950 students in seventh through tenth grades. Students from Mantua Township had attended Pitman High School as part of a sending/receiving relationship, while students from Harrison Township were sent on a tuition-basis to Glassboro High School.

Desilets v. Clearview Regional Board of Education, was a case involving the district in which the New Jersey Supreme Court ruled in 1994 that a curricular student newspaper has a lower standard of protection under the First Amendment based on the educational mission of the school.

== Schools ==
Schools in the district (with 2023–24 enrollment data from the National Center for Education Statistics) are:

- Clearview Regional Middle School with 697 students in grades 7 and 8
  - Kate Bourquin, principal
- Clearview Regional High School with 1,412 students in grades 9-12
  - Thomas Jones, principal

== Administration ==
Core members of the district's administration are:

- John Horchak III, superintendent
- Esther R. Pennell, business administrator and board secretary

== Board of education ==
The district's board of education, comprised of nine members, sets policy and oversees the fiscal and educational operation of the district through its administration. As a Type II school district, the board's trustees are elected directly by voters to serve three-year terms of office on a staggered basis, with three seats up for election each year held (since 2012) as part of the November general election. The board appoints a superintendent to oversee the district's day-to-day operations and a business administrator to supervise the business functions of the district. Seats on the nine-member board are allocated based on population, with five seats assigned to Mantua and four to Harrison Township.
