= Logan Township School District =

School district in Gloucester County, New Jersey, US

Address
- 110 School Lane Logan Township, Gloucester County, New Jersey, 08085; United States
- Coordinates: 39.748539°N 75.332887°W

District information
- Grades: PreK-8
- Superintendent: Kristi Jansen
- Business administrator: Dawn Leary
- Schools: 3

Students and staff
- Enrollment: 876 (as of 2021–22)
- Faculty: 82.5 FTEs
- Student–teacher ratio: 10.6:1

Other information
- District Factor Group: FG
- Website: www.logan.k12.nj.us
Ind.	Per pupil	District spending	Rank (*)	K-8 average	%± vs. average
1A	Total Spending	$17,127	41	$18,891	−9.3%
1	Budgetary Cost	15,526	69	14,159	9.7%
2	Classroom Instruction	9,525	71	8,659	10.0%
6	Support Services	2,566	70	2,167	18.4%
8	Administrative Cost	1,398	25	1,547	−9.6%
10	Operations & Maintenance	1,956	74	1,612	21.3%
13	Extracurricular Activities	75	29	104	−27.9%
16	Median Teacher Salary	62,550	52	61,136
Data from NJDoE 2014 Taxpayers' Guide to Education Spending. *Of K-8 districts with more than 750 students. Lowest spending=1; Highest=84

The Logan Township School District is a community public school district that serves students in pre-kindergarten through eighth grade from Logan Township, in Gloucester County, in the U.S. state of New Jersey.

As of the 2021–22 school year, the district, comprising three schools, had an enrollment of 876 students and 82.5 classroom teachers (on an FTE basis), for a student–teacher ratio of 10.6:1.

The district is classified by the New Jersey Department of Education as being in District Factor Group "FG", the fourth-highest of eight groupings. District Factor Groups organize districts statewide to allow comparison by common socioeconomic characteristics of the local districts. From lowest socioeconomic status to highest, the categories are A, B, CD, DE, FG, GH, I and J.

Public school students in ninth through twelfth grades are educated at Kingsway Regional High School under a sending/receiving relationship in which tuition is paid on a per-pupil basis to the Kingsway Regional School District, which serves students in seventh through twelfth grades from East Greenwich Township, South Harrison Township, Swedesboro and Woolwich Township. As of the 2021–22 school year, the district, comprising two schools, had an enrollment of 2,863 students and 231.8 classroom teachers (on an FTE basis), for a student–teacher ratio of 12.4:1. Schools in the district (with 2021–22 enrollment data from the National Center for Education Statistics) are Kingsway Regional Middle School with 925 students in grades 7-8 and Kingsway Regional High School with 1,893 students in grades 9-12. Under a 2011 proposal, Kingsway would merge with its constituent member's K-6 districts to become a full K-12 district, with various options for including Logan Township as part of the consolidated district.

== Schools ==
Schools in the district (with 2024–25 enrollment data from the National Center for Education Statistics) are:

- Francis E. Donnelly Early Childhood Learning Center with 186 students in grades PreK-K
  - Nikima Stewart (resigned ), principal
- Logan Elementary School with 374 students in grades 1-5
  - Carrie Selb, principal
- Logan Middle School with 258 students in grades 6-8
  - Kara Damminger, principal

== Administration ==
Core members of the district's administration are:

- Kristi Jansen, superintendent
- Christian Albadine, business administrator / board secretary

== Board of education ==
The district's board of education, comprised of nine members, sets policy and oversees the fiscal and educational operation of the district through its administration. As a Type II school district, the board's trustees are elected directly by voters to serve three-year terms of office on a staggered basis, with three seats up for election each year held (since 2012) as part of the November general election. The board appoints a superintendent to oversee the district's day-to-day operations and a business administrator to supervise the business functions of the district.
