= Gloucester County, New Jersey =

County in New Jersey, United States

- County
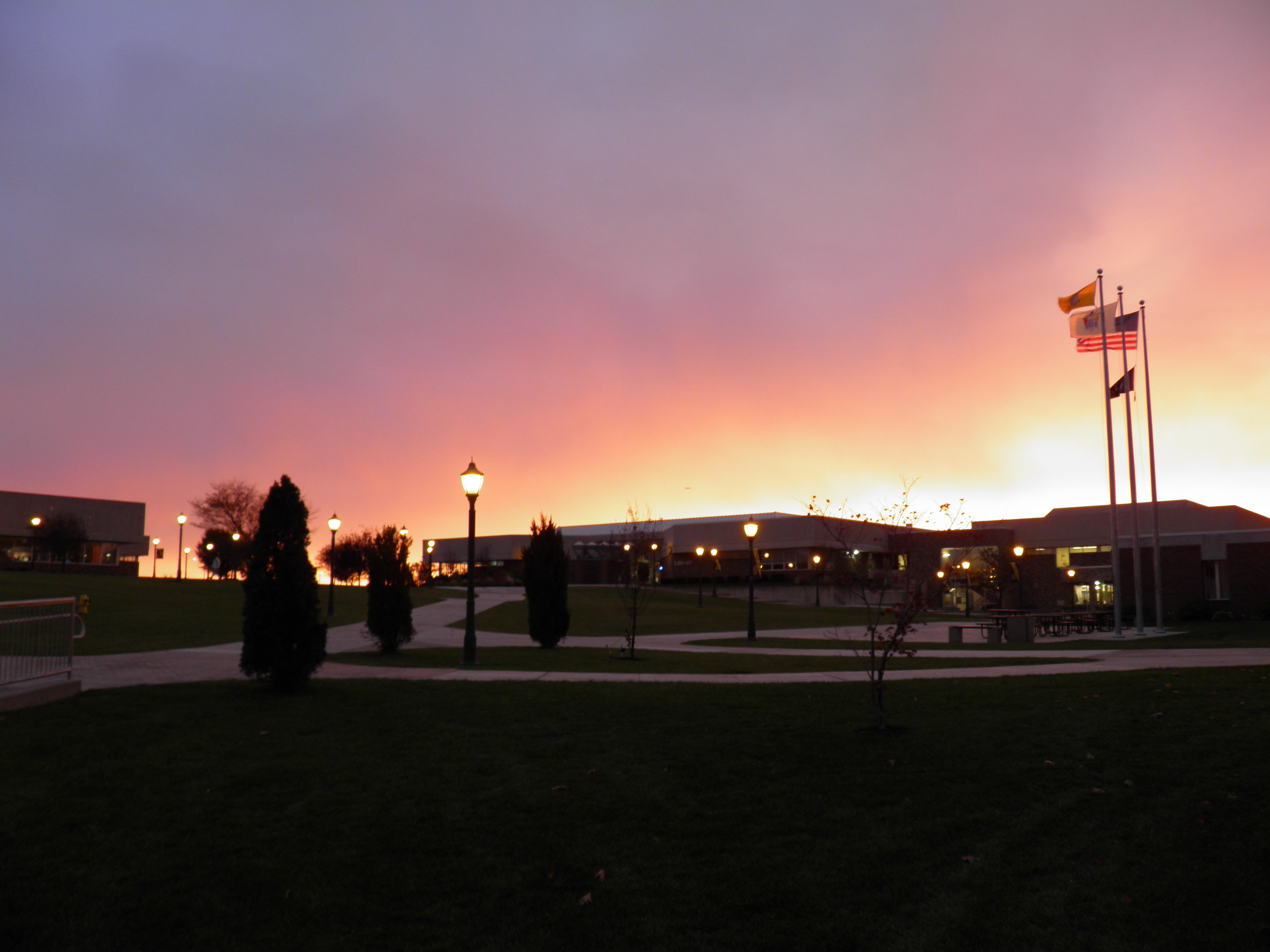
- Rowan College of South Jersey in Sewell at sunset in November 2010

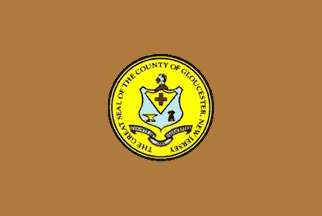
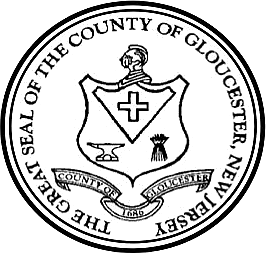
- Flag Seal Logo

- Location within the U.S. state of New Jersey
- Interactive map of Gloucester County, New Jersey
- Coordinates: 39.71°N 75.14°W
- Country: United States
- State: New Jersey
- Founded: 1686
- Named for: Gloucester / Gloucestershire, England
- Seat: Woodbury
- Largest Municipality: Washington Township (population); Franklin Township (area)

Government
  - Commission Director: Frank J. DiMarco (D, Deptford Township)

Area
  - Total: 336.77 sq mi (872.2 km^{2})
  - Land: 322.00 sq mi (834.0 km^{2})
  - Water: 14.77 sq mi (38.3 km^{2}) 4.4%

Population (2020)
  - Total: 302,294
  - Estimate (2025): 312,638 ▲
  - Density: 938.8/sq mi (362.5/km^{2})
- Time zone: UTC−5 (Eastern)
  - Summer (DST): UTC−4 (EDT)
- Congressional districts: 1st, 2nd
- Website: gloucestercountynj.gov

Gloucester County (/ˈɡlɒstər/ GLOST-ər) is a county in the U.S. state of New Jersey. As of the 2020 census, the county was the state's 14th-most populous county with a population of 302,294, its highest decennial count ever and an increase of 14,006 (+4.9%) from the 288,288 counted in the 2010 census, which in turn represented an increase of 33,615 (+13.2%) from the 2000 census population of 254,673. The United States Census Bureau's Population Estimates Program estimated a 2025 population of 312,638, an increase of 10,344 (+3.4%) from the 2020 decennial census. Its county seat is Woodbury. The county is part of the South Jersey region of the state.

The county's largest municipality by population in 2020 was Washington Township, with a population of 48,677, while the largest municipality by area was Franklin Township, which covered 56.39 square miles (146.0 km^{2}).

The county is part of the Philadelphia metropolitan area, which is formally designated as the Philadelphia–Camden–Wilmington, PA–NJ–DE–MD Metropolitan Statistical Area.

Gloucester County borders Philadelphia, the nation's sixth-most populous city, to its northwest across the Delaware River. Atlantic City is 52 miles (84 km) to the county's southeast. Gloucester County and adjacent Salem County, also in South Jersey, have become an East Coast epicenter for logistics and warehouse construction.

== History ==
Woodbury, the county seat, was founded in 1683 and is the county's oldest municipality. National Park in Gloucester County was the site of the American Revolutionary War's Battle of Red Bank, where Fort Mercer once stood. It is now the site of Red Bank Battlefield Park in National Park. The remains of the Royal Navy's HMS Augusta were laid in Red Bank Battlefield Park until they were later moved to Gloucester City.

During the colonial era, Gloucester County's main industry sector was agriculture. Woodbury was the site of the county courthouse, the county jail, a Quaker meeting house that is still in existence, and an inn located on the current location of Woodbury Crossings. Due in part to the county's many creeks that lead to the Delaware River and Atlantic Ocean, smuggling was once common in the county.

In June 1967, the county hosted the Glassboro Summit Conference, a Cold War summit between U.S. President Lyndon B. Johnson and Soviet Premier Alexei Kosygin held on June 23–25 at Hollybush Mansion in Glassboro, the home of the president of Glassboro State College (now Rowan University). The site was chosen as a compromise roughly halfway between New York, where Kosygin had addressed the United Nations, and Washington. Johnson and Kosygin failed to reach agreement on limiting anti-ballistic missile systems, but the summit's friendly atmosphere became known as the "Spirit of Glassboro".

=== Etymology ===
The county is named after the city of Gloucester and county of Gloucestershire in England.

== Geography and climate ==
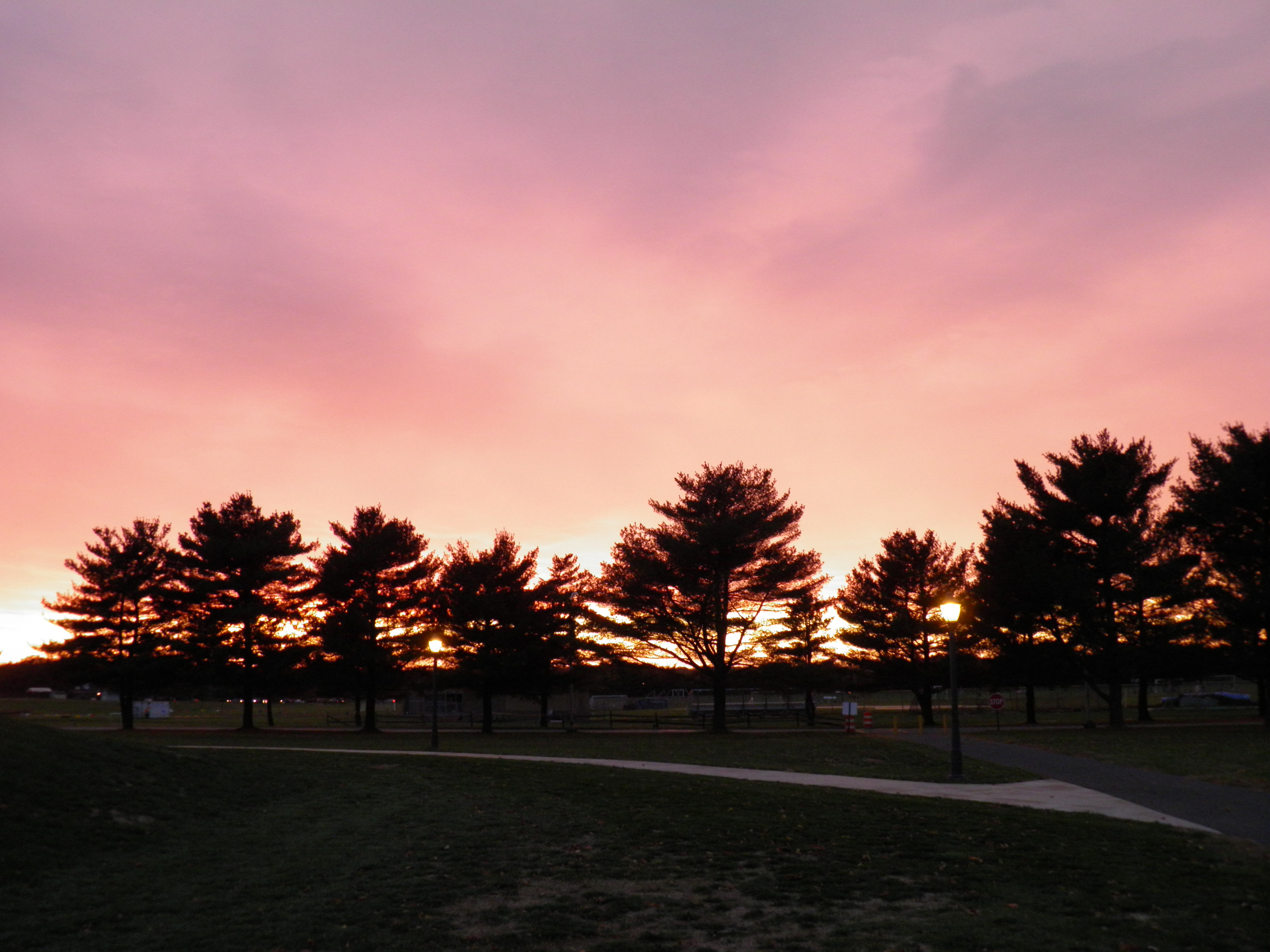
Gloucester County features coastal plains, where pine trees often grow, as seen at Rowan College of South Jersey.

According to the U.S. Census Bureau, as of the 2020 census, the county had a total area of 336.77 square miles (872.2 km^{2}), of which 322.00 square miles (834.0 km^{2}) was land (95.6%) and 14.77 square miles (38.3 km^{2}) was water (4.4%). Gloucester County is largely comprised of low-lying rivers and coastal plains, stretching southeastward from the Delaware River to the New Jersey Pine Barrens. The highest elevation in the county is a slight rise on County Road 654 southeast of Monroe Township that rises to approximately 180 feet (55 m) above sea level. The county's lowest elevation is at sea level on the Delaware River.

=== Climate and weather ===
Average temperatures in the county seat of Woodbury have ranged from a low of 26 °F (−3 °C) in January to a high of 87 °F (31 °C) in July. A record low of −11 °F (−24 °C) was recorded in February 1934 and a record high of 106 °F (41 °C) was recorded in August 1918. Average monthly precipitation ranged from 2.75 inches (70 mm) in February to 4.35 inches (110 mm) in July. The county has a humid subtropical climate (Cfa). Average monthly temperatures in Newfield range from 33.0 °F in January to 76.6 °F in July.

== Demographics ==
Historical population
Census	Pop.	Note	%±
1790	13,363		—
1800	16,115		20.6%
1810	19,744		22.5%
1820	23,089		16.9%
1830	28,431		23.1%
1840	25,438	*	−10.5%
1850	14,655	*	−42.4%
1860	18,444		25.9%
1870	21,562		16.9%
1880	25,886		20.1%
1890	28,649		10.7%
1900	31,905		11.4%
1910	37,368		17.1%
1920	48,224		29.1%
1930	70,802		46.8%
1940	72,219		2.0%
1950	91,727		27.0%
1960	134,840		47.0%
1970	172,681		28.1%
1980	199,917		15.8%
1990	230,082		15.1%
2000	254,673		10.7%
2010	288,288		13.2%
2020	302,294		4.9%
2025 (est.)	312,638		3.4%
Historical sources: 1790–1990 1970–2010; 2000 2010 2020 * = Lost territory in previous decade.

Swedesboro and Bridgeport were among the earliest European settlements in New Jersey and were both part of the 17th century New Sweden colony. Gloucester County dates back to May 26, 1686, when courts were established separate from those in Burlington County. On May 17, 1694, the county was officially formed and its boundaries defined as part of West Jersey. Portions of Gloucester County were set off on February 7, 1837, to create Atlantic County. On March 13, 1844, its boundaries were again defined as part of the creation of neighboring Camden County. The county was named for the city of Gloucester and the county of Gloucestershire in the United Kingdom.

=== 2020 census ===
As of the 2020 census, the county had a population of 302,294, representing an increase of 14,006 (4.9%) from the 288,288 residents enumerated in the 2010 census. The median age was 40.1 years, 21.5% of residents were under the age of 18, and 16.5% were 65 years of age or older, while for every 100 females there were 94.7 males and for every 100 females age 18 and over there were 91.9 males age 18 and over.

The racial makeup of the county was 76.2% White, 10.9% Black or African American, 0.2% American Indian and Alaska Native, 3.2% Asian, <0.1% Native Hawaiian and Pacific Islander, 2.7% from some other race, and 6.8% from two or more races. Hispanic or Latino residents of any race comprised 7.3% of the population.

88.7% of residents lived in urban areas, while 11.3% lived in rural areas.

There were 110,471 households in the county, of which 32.5% had children under the age of 18 living in them. Of all households, 51.9% were married-couple households, 15.4% were households with a male householder and no spouse or partner present, and 25.9% were households with a female householder and no spouse or partner present. About 23.3% of all households were made up of individuals and 10.6% had someone living alone who was 65 years of age or older.

There were 117,208 housing units, of which 5.7% were vacant. Among occupied housing units, 77.3% were owner-occupied and 22.7% were renter-occupied. The homeowner vacancy rate was 1.5% and the rental vacancy rate was 7.5%.

=== Racial and ethnic composition ===
Gloucester County, New Jersey – Racial and ethnic composition Note: the US Census treats Hispanic/Latino as an ethnic category. This table excludes Latinos from the racial categories and assigns them to a separate category. Hispanics/Latinos may be of any race.
Race / Ethnicity (NH = Non-Hispanic)	Pop 1980	Pop 1990	Pop 2000	Pop 2010	Pop 2020	% 1980	% 1990	% 2000	% 2010	% 2020
White alone (NH)	178,858	202,989	218,262	233,695	225,355	89.47%	88.22%	85.70%	81.06%	74.55%
Black or African American alone (NH)	16,769	19,591	22,562	27,906	31,517	8.39%	8.51%	8.86%	9.68%	10.43%
Native American or Alaska Native alone (NH)	303	424	426	361	331	0.15%	0.18%	0.17%	0.13%	0.11%
Asian alone (NH)	1,052	2,798	3,763	7,534	9,475	0.53%	1.22%	1.48%	2.61%	3.13%
Native Hawaiian or Pacific Islander alone (NH)	x	x	60	62	74	x	x	0.02%	0.02%	0.02%
Other race alone (NH)	528	149	221	310	1,103	0.26%	0.06%	0.09%	0.11%	0.36%
Mixed race or Multiracial (NH)	x	x	2,796	4,708	12,304	x	x	1.10%	1.63%	4.07%
Hispanic or Latino (any race)	2,407	4,131	6,583	13,712	22,135	1.20%	1.80%	2.58%	4.76%	7.32%
Total	199,917	230,082	254,673	288,288	302,294	100.00%	100.00%	100.00%	100.00%	100.00%

=== 2010 census ===
The 2010 United States census counted 288,288 people, 104,271 households, and 75,805 families in the county. The population density was 895.3 inhabitants per square mile (345.7/km^{2}). There were 109,796 housing units at an average density of 341 per square mile (132/km^{2}). The racial makeup was 83.56% (240,890) White, 10.06% (29,006) Black or African American, 0.17% (501) Native American, 2.64% (7,609) Asian, 0.03% (95) Pacific Islander, 1.41% (4,055) from other races, and 2.13% (6,132) from two or more races. Hispanic or Latino of any race were 4.76% (13,712) of the population.

Of the 104,271 households, 33.4% had children under the age of 18; 55.6% were married couples living together; 12.4% had a female householder with no husband present and 27.3% were non-families. Of all households, 22% were made up of individuals and 8.9% had someone living alone who was 65 years of age or older. The average household size was 2.72 and the average family size was 3.2.

24.4% of the population were under the age of 18, 9.4% from 18 to 24, 25.6% from 25 to 44, 28.3% from 45 to 64, and 12.4% who were 65 years of age or older. The median age was 38.7 years. For every 100 females, the population had 94.4 males. For every 100 females ages 18 and older there were 91.1 males.

== Economy ==
The Bureau of Economic Analysis calculated that the county's gross domestic product was $14.0 billion in 2021, which was ranked 14th in the state and was a 2.8% increase from the prior year.

== Education ==
=== Colleges and universities ===
Rowan University in Glassboro is a public university that was founded in 1923 on a 25-acre (10 ha) site donated by the borough.

Rowan College of South Jersey is the county college for Gloucester County. It was established in 1966 as Gloucester County College and opened to students two years later in 1968. Its main campus is in Sewell in Gloucester County; it also operates two satellite campuses in Vineland and Millville, both in Cumberland County.

=== School districts ===
School districts in Gloucester County include:

K-12

- Clayton Public Schools
- Deptford Township Schools
- Glassboro Public Schools
- Gloucester County Special Services School District
- Gloucester County Vocational-Technical School District
- Monroe Township Public Schools
- Paulsboro Public Schools
- Pitman School District
- Washington Township Public School District
- West Deptford Public Schools
- Woodbury Public Schools

Secondary

- Clearview Regional High School District
- Delsea Regional School District
- Gateway Regional School District
- Kingsway Regional School District

Elementary (K-6, except as indicated)

- East Greenwich Township School District
- Elk Township School District
- Franklin Township Public Schools
- Greenwich Township School District (K-8)
- Harrison Township School District
- Logan Township School District (K-8)
- Mantua Township School District
- National Park School District
- South Harrison Township School District
- Swedesboro-Woolwich School District – Consolidated
- Wenonah School District
- Westville School District
- Woodbury Heights School District

=== Vocational school ===
Gloucester County has a vocational school, the Gloucester County Institute of Technology, a four-year vocational-technical high school in Deptford Township that serves students from across the county and is part of the Gloucester County Vocational-Technical School District, located in Sewell.

== Municipalities ==
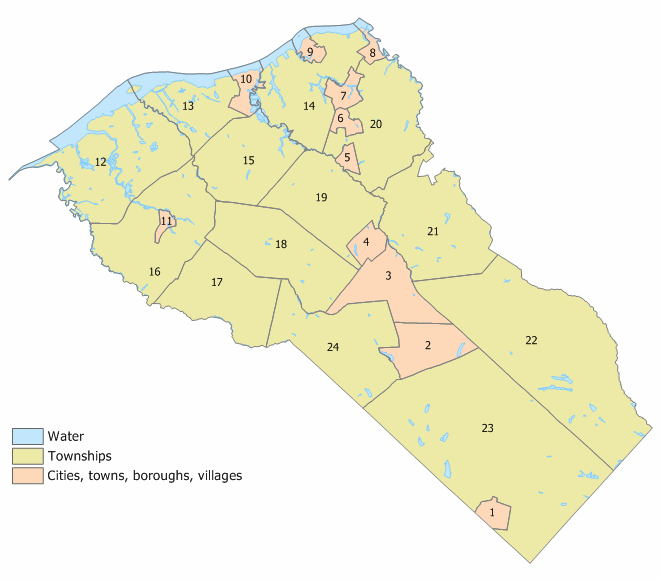
Map of municipalities in Gloucester County

Gloucester County's 24 municipalities along with population, housing units and area from the 2010 U.S. census include:

Municipality (with map key)	Map key	Municipal type	Pop.	Housing Units	Total Area	Water Area	Land Area	Pop. Density	Housing Density	School District	Communities
Clayton	2	borough	8,807	3,128	7.33	0.19	7.14	1,145.5	438.1	Clayton	
Deptford	20	township	31,977	12,361	17.61	0.25	17.36	1,760.3	712.0	Deptford	Almonesson; Good Intent; Oak Valley CDP (3,497)
East Greenwich; Township	15	township	11,706	3,405	14.92	0.48	14.44	661.7	235.8	Kingsway (7-12); East Greenwich (PK-6)	Mickleton CDP (2,285); Mount Royal CDP (777); Wolfert
Elk Township	24	township	4,424	1,576	19.69	0.19	19.49	216.3	80.8	Delsea (7-12); Elk Township (PK-6)	
Franklin; Township	23	township	16,380	6,104	56.47	0.56	55.91	300.9	109.2	Delsea (7-12); Franklin Township (K-6)	Franklinville CDP (1,927); Malaga CDP (1,475)
Glassboro	3	borough	23,149	6,590	9.22	0.04	9.18	2,022.9	717.5	Glassboro	
Greenwich; Township	13	township	4,917	2,048	12.03	3.06	8.97	546.2	228.3	Paulsboro (9-12) (S/R); Greenwich Township (K-8)	Billingsport; Gibbstown CDP (3,822)
Harrison; Township	18	township	13,641	4,089	19.23	0.09	19.14	648.7	213.6	Clearview (7-12); Harrison Township (PK-6)	Ewan; Mullica Hill CDP (4,698); Richwood CDP (part; 3,400)
Logan Township	12	township	6,000	2,172	26.93	5.00	21.93	275.6	99.1	Kingsway (9-12) (S/R); Logan (PK-8)	Beckett CDP (4,834); Bridgeport CDP (389); Repaupo
Mantua; Township	19	township	15,235	5,980	15.92	0.07	15.85	960.1	377.3	Clearview (7-12); Mantua Township (PK-6)	Richwood CDP (part; 59); Sewell CDP (part; 3,346)
Monroe; Township	22	township	37,117	13,387	46.93	0.53	46.39	778.8	288.6	Monroe Township	Victory Lakes CDP (1,999); Williamstown CDP (15,082)
National Park	9	borough	3,026	1,153	1.45	0.45	1.00	3,023.2	1,148.1	Gateway (7-12); National Park (PK-6)	
Newfield	1	borough	1,774	626	1.71	0.00	1.70	912.0	367.6	Delsea (7-12); Franklin Township (K-6) (S/R)	
Paulsboro	10	borough	6,196	2,533	2.60	0.71	1.90	3,216.4	1,336.2	Paulsboro	
Pitman	4	borough	8,780	3,705	2.31	0.04	2.27	3,976.1	1,634.8	Pitman	
South Harrison; Township	17	township	3,395	1,056	15.73	0.05	15.68	201.7	67.4	Kingsway (7-12); South Harrison (K-6)	Harrisonville CDP (306)
Swedesboro	11	borough	2,711	1,004	0.76	0.03	0.72	3,568.4	1,386.5	Kingsway (7-12); Swedesboro-Woolwich (K-6)	
Washington; Township	21	township	48,677	17,810	21.60	0.22	21.38	2,271.0	833.0	Washington Township	Grenloch; Hurffville; Turnersville CDP (3,594); Sewell CDP (part; 3,346)
Wenonah	5	borough	2,283	860	0.98	0.01	0.97	2,342.8	884.4	Gateway (7-12); Wenonah (K-6)	
West Deptford	14	township	22,197	9,441	17.87	2.45	15.41	1,406.6	612.6	West Deptford	Colonial Manor; Thorofare CDP (2,806)
Westville	8	borough	4,264	1,912	1.38	0.35	1.02	4,187.0	1,867.0	Gateway (7-12); Westville (PK-6)	
Woodbury	7	city	9,963	4,456	2.06	0.05	2.01	5,064.0	2,217.9	Woodbury	
Woodbury Heights	6	borough	3,098	1,125	1.23	0.01	1.22	2,499.4	920.4	Gateway (7-12); Woodbury Heights (PK-6)	
Woolwich; Township	16	township	12,577	3,275	21.23	0.32	20.91	487.8	156.6	Kingsway (7-12); Swedesboro-Woolwich (K-6)	
Gloucester County		county	302,294	109,796	337.18	15.17	322.01	895.3	341.0		

== Transportation ==
=== Roads and highways ===
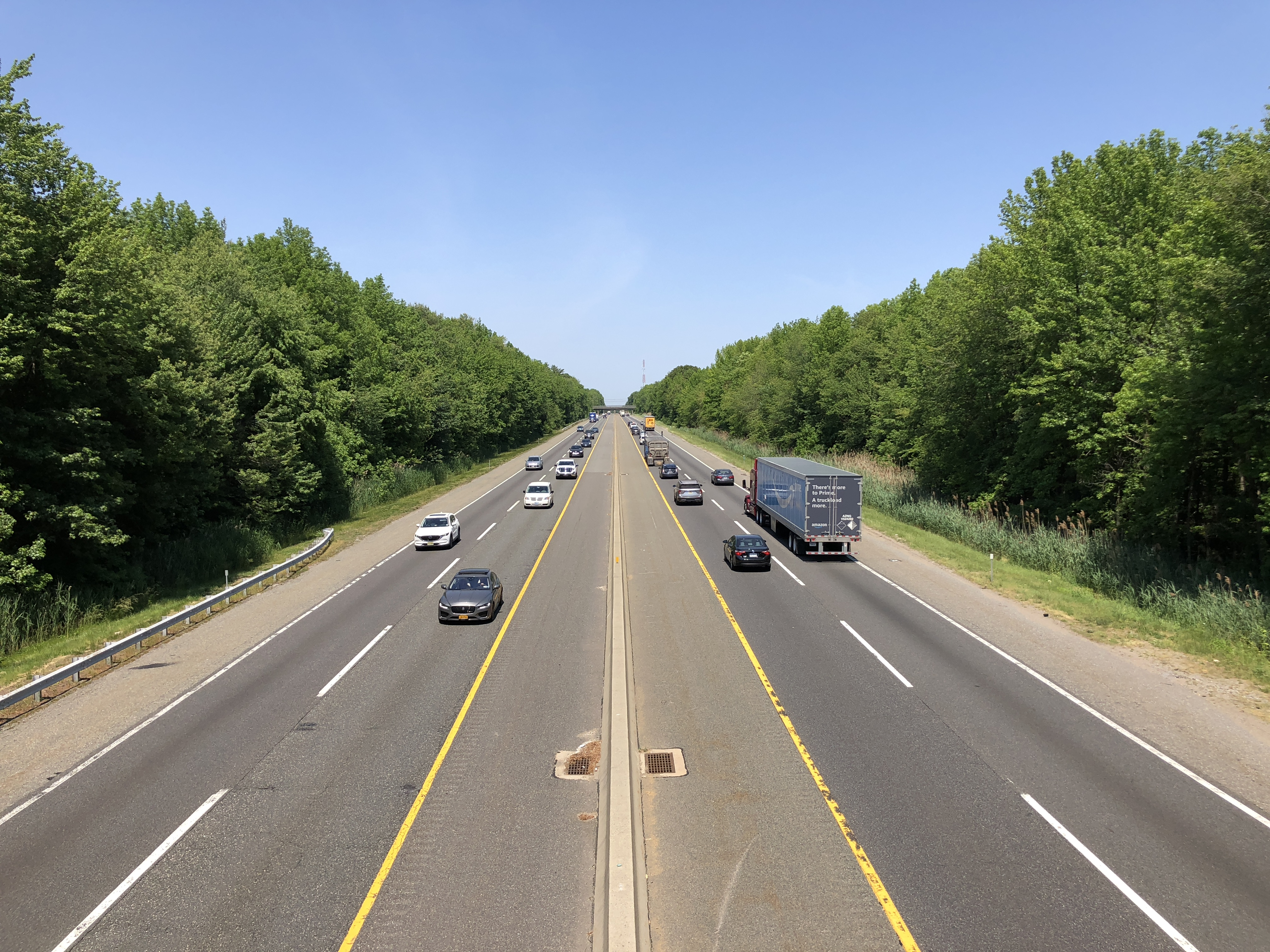
New Jersey Turnpike in Deptford Township in May 2021

As of 2010, the county had 1,698.59 miles (2,733.62 km) of roadways, 1,126.99 miles (1,813.71 km) of which is maintained by the local municipality, 406.47 miles (654.15 km) by Gloucester County, 145.11 miles (233.53 km) by the New Jersey Department of Transportation, 2.22 miles (3.57 km) by the Delaware River Port Authority, 1.09 miles (1.75 km) by the South Jersey Transportation Authority, and 16.71 miles (26.89 km) by the New Jersey Turnpike Authority.

Various county, state, U.S. routes, and interstates pass through the county. Major county highways include County Route 534, County Route 536, County Route 538, County Route 544, County Route 551, County Route 553, County Route 555, and County Route 557.

State Routes include Route 41, Route 42, which is part of the North-South Freeway, Route 45, Route 47, Route 55, Route 77, and Route 168. Route 324 is located in Logan Township in the county. The three U.S. routes that traverse the county include: U.S. Route 130 in the northwest, U.S. Route 322 near the county's center, and U.S. Route 40 at the county's southern tip.

The Commodore Barry Bridge crosses the Delaware River, carrying U.S. Route 322 between Chester, Pennsylvania and Logan Township in the county.

Interstate 295 is an interstate that runs through the county's northwest for about 14 miles (23 km). The New Jersey Turnpike passes through the county in the northwest and interchanges at Exit 2 in Woolwich Township in the county. The Atlantic City Expressway briefly passes through the county in Washington Township before ending at an interchange with Route 42.

=== Public transportation ===
NJ Transit bus service between the county and 30th Street Station in Center City Philadelphia is available on the 313 and 315 routes. Additional public transportation in the county includes the 400, 401 (from Salem), 402 (from Pennsville Township), 403, 408, 410 (from Bridgeton), and 412 (from Sewell) routes, and local service is available on the 455 (Cherry Hill to Paulsboro) and 463 (between Woodbury and the Avandale Park/Ride in Winslow Township) routes.

The Glassboro–Camden Line, a proposed 18-mile (28.97 km) diesel multiple unit (DMU) light rail system to connect with the River Line and PATCO Speedline in Camden, was initially anticipated to be in operation by 2019. However, a lack of an official sponsor and funding source have to date delayed the project.

=== Freight rail ===
Gloucester County is located in Conrail's South Jersey/Philadelphia Shared Assets Area, freight rail in the county travels along the Penns Grove Secondary, the Salem Branch, and the Vineland Secondary. SMS Rail Lines handles interchanges with CSX Transportation and Norfolk Southern Railway.

=== Port ===
The Port of Paulsboro is located on the Delaware River and Mantua Creek in and around Paulsboro in the county. Traditionally one of the nation's busiest ports for marine transfer operations of petroleum products, the port is undergoing redevelopment as an adaptable omni port able to handle bulk, breakbulk cargo, and shipping containers. Studies completed in 2012 concluded that the port is well suited to become a center for the manufacture, assembly, and transport of wind turbines and platforms involved in wind power development.

== Government ==
=== County government ===
Gloucester County is governed by a Board of County Commissioners and includes seven members who are elected at-large to three-year terms of office on a staggered basis in partisan elections, with either two or three seats coming up for election each November. At a reorganization meeting held each January, the Board selects a director and a deputy director from among the members. In 2017, commissioners, then called freeholders, were paid $16,908 annually and the director was paid $17,908. As of 2025, Gloucester County's Commissioners are (with terms for director and deputy director ending December 31):

Commissioner	Party, Residence, Term
Director Frank J. DiMarco	D, Deptford Township, 2025
Deputy Director Jim Jefferson	D, Woodbury 2026
Nicholas DeSilvio	R, Franklin Township, 2027
Denice DiCarlo	D, West Deptford Township 2025
Joann Gattinelli	D, Washington Township, 2026
Christopher Konawel Jr.	R, Glassboro, 2027
Matt Weng	D, Pitman, 2026

Pursuant to Article VII Section II of the Constitution of New Jersey, each county in New Jersey is required to have three elected administrative officials known as constitutional officers. These officials are the County Clerk and County Surrogate, both elected for five-year terms of office, and the County Sheriff, who is elected for a three-year term. Gloucester County's constitutional officers are:

Title	Representative
County Clerk	James N. Hogan (D, Franklin Township; 2027),
Sheriff	Carmel Morina (D, Greenwich Township; 2027)
Surrogate	Giuseppe "Joe" Chila (D, Woolwich Township; 2028).

Gloucester County's prosecutor, appointed in March 2020, is Christine A. Hoffman. Along with Cumberland and Salem counties, Gloucester County is part of Vicinage 15 of the New Jersey Superior Court, which is based in Woodbury in Gloucester County; the assignment judge for the vicinage is Benjamin C. Telsey. Gloucester County Courthouse is located in Woodbury.

=== Federal representatives ===
Gloucester County is part of the 1st and 2nd Congressional Districts. For the 119th United States Congress, New Jersey's 1st congressional district is represented by Donald Norcross (D, Camden). For the 119th United States Congress, New Jersey's 2nd congressional district is represented by Jeff Van Drew (R, Dennis Township).

=== State representatives ===
The 24 municipalities of Gloucester County are part of three legislative districts.

District	Senator	Assembly	Municipalities
3rd	John Burzichelli (D)	Heather Simmons (D) Dave Bailey (D)	Clayton, East Greenwich Township, Elk Township, Glassboro, Greenwich Township, Harrison, Logan Township, Mantua, National Park, Newfield, Paulsboro, Pitman, South Harrison Township, Swedesboro, Wenonah, West Deptford Township, Westville, and Woolwich Township. The remainder of this district includes portions of Cumberland County and all of Salem County.
4th	Paul D. Moriarty (D)	Dan Hutchinson (D) Cody Miller (D)	Franklin Township, Monroe Township, and Washington Township. The remainder of this district covers portions of Camden County and Atlantic County.
5th	Nilsa Cruz-Perez (D)	William Spearman (D) Bill Moen (D)	Deptford Township, Woodbury, and Woodbury Heights. The remainder of this district includes portions of Camden County

== Politics ==
United States presidential election results for Gloucester County, New Jersey
Year	Republican		Democratic		Third party(ies)	
Year	No.	%	No.	%	No.	%
1896	4,727	59.02%	2,981	37.22%	301	3.76%
1900	4,471	57.60%	2,828	36.43%	463	5.96%
1904	4,829	59.14%	2,818	34.51%	518	6.34%
1908	5,318	56.38%	3,706	39.29%	409	4.34%
1912	1,856	21.12%	3,364	38.29%	3,566	40.59%
1916	5,352	54.82%	3,745	38.36%	665	6.81%
1920	11,693	66.60%	4,869	27.73%	995	5.67%
1924	15,513	72.74%	4,167	19.54%	1,648	7.73%
1928	25,627	79.34%	6,594	20.41%	81	0.25%
1932	18,782	55.96%	13,817	41.17%	962	2.87%
1936	15,813	43.18%	20,516	56.02%	293	0.80%
1940	17,674	46.38%	20,284	53.22%	153	0.40%
1944	16,684	48.28%	17,758	51.39%	113	0.33%
1948	19,477	54.46%	15,785	44.14%	503	1.41%
1952	25,103	54.89%	20,536	44.90%	98	0.21%
1956	30,646	60.41%	20,007	39.44%	75	0.15%
1960	32,474	52.16%	29,752	47.79%	33	0.05%
1964	23,702	37.00%	40,305	62.93%	45	0.07%
1968	30,596	44.52%	27,438	39.92%	10,697	15.56%
1972	44,806	62.92%	25,509	35.82%	894	1.26%
1976	34,888	46.33%	38,726	51.43%	1,688	2.24%
1980	40,306	51.08%	29,804	37.77%	8,793	11.14%
1984	54,041	62.08%	32,702	37.57%	307	0.35%
1988	51,708	58.68%	35,479	40.26%	930	1.06%
1992	37,335	35.69%	42,425	40.55%	24,859	23.76%
1996	32,116	31.96%	51,915	51.66%	16,464	16.38%
2000	42,315	39.44%	61,095	56.94%	3,888	3.62%
2004	60,033	46.91%	66,835	52.23%	1,096	0.86%
2008	60,315	43.10%	77,267	55.21%	2,364	1.69%
2012	59,456	43.86%	74,013	54.59%	2,101	1.55%
2016	67,544	47.82%	66,870	47.34%	6,840	4.84%
2020	83,340	48.27%	86,702	50.22%	2,612	1.51%
2024	83,326	50.61%	78,708	47.81%	2,601	1.58%

The county has tended to be a bellwether, as it has voted for the national winner all but four times since 1936. In 2016, Donald Trump became the first Republican to win Gloucester County (through a narrow plurality of 674 votes) since 1988, when George H. W. Bush won it and New Jersey's electoral votes as well, the last time a Republican has done so. In 2020, the county voted for Democrat Joe Biden, but in 2024 it voted for Trump again, this time giving him a full majority of over 50%. As of October 2021, there were a total of 230,545 registered voters in Gloucester County. Of these, 89,073 (38.6%) were registered as Democrats, 57,779 (25.1%) were registered as Republicans and 80,776 (35.0%) were registered as unaffiliated. There were 2,917 voters (1.3%) registered to other parties.

Senate Class 1 election results

United States Senate election results for Gloucester County, New Jersey1
Year	Republican		Democratic		Third party(ies)	
Year	No.	%	No.	%	No.	%
2024	77,303	48.51%	80,034	50.23%	2,012	1.26%
2018	56,090	49.81%	52,203	46.36%	4,309	3.83%
2012	52,591	40.48%	74,271	57.16%	3,072	2.36%
2006	36,559	44.89%	42,766	52.51%	2,117	2.60%
2000	49,660	47.95%	49,802	48.08%	4,115	3.97%
1994	30,429	44.67%	34,458	50.59%	3,231	4.74%
1988	39,232	45.34%	46,247	53.44%	1,055	1.22%
1982	27,280	44.17%	33,409	54.10%	1,067	1.73%

Senate Class 2 election results

United States Senate election results for Gloucester County, New Jersey2
Year	Republican		Democratic		Third party(ies)	
Year	No.	%	No.	%	No.	%
2020	80,943	47.64%	85,489	50.31%	3,487	2.05%
2014	31,717	45.11%	37,131	52.81%	1,456	2.07%
2013	20,871	48.85%	21,240	49.71%	613	1.43%
2008	55,024	42.00%	72,990	55.72%	2,992	2.28%
2002	31,140	42.12%	41,009	55.47%	1,776	2.40%
1996	40,105	42.16%	49,190	51.71%	5,830	6.13%
1990	25,374	40.89%	35,379	57.01%	1,307	2.11%
1984	30,096	34.76%	56,072	64.76%	421	0.49%

=== State elections ===
Governor election results

Gubernatorial election results for Gloucester County, New Jersey
Year	Republican		Democratic		Third party(ies)	
Year	No.	%	No.	%	No.	%
2025	61,265	47.39%	67,066	51.88%	935	0.72%
2021	54,976	54.57%	44,959	44.63%	813	0.81%
2017	32,448	42.31%	42,349	55.22%	1,898	2.47%
2013	50,640	64.11%	27,060	34.26%	1,285	1.63%
2009	39,815	47.26%	37,066	43.99%	7,370	8.75%
2005	33,225	42.95%	41,128	53.17%	3,004	3.88%
2001	28,210	39.91%	41,083	58.12%	1,392	1.97%
1997	30,314	38.41%	41,082	52.06%	7,519	9.53%
1993	31,252	41.18%	41,931	55.25%	2,709	3.57%
1989	20,871	30.07%	47,760	68.81%	777	1.12%
1985	35,424	63.57%	19,662	35.28%	640	1.15%
1981	21,017	31.97%	44,259	67.32%	471	0.72%
1977	20,532	36.40%	33,433	59.27%	2,446	4.34%
1973	18,149	34.55%	34,097	64.92%	279	0.53%
1969	35,255	62.72%	20,446	36.37%	511	0.91%
1965	24,487	47.80%	26,411	51.56%	328	0.64%
1961	24,183	48.77%	25,289	51.01%	109	0.22%
1957	19,012	44.90%	23,297	55.02%	30	0.07%
1953	18,216	50.07%	18,012	49.51%	152	0.42%

== Emergency services ==
Gloucester County is served by the Gloucester County Emergency Medical Services (GCEMS), the first county-based EMS agency in New Jersey, which provides emergency services to the municipalities of Clayton, Deptford Township, East Greenwich Township, Elk Township, Franklin Township, Glassboro, Greenwich Township, Harrison Township, Logan Township, Mantua Township, Monroe Township, National Park, Newfield, Paulsboro, Pitman, South Harrison Township, Swedesboro, Wenonah, West Deptford Township, Westville, Woolwich Township, Woodbury, and Woodbury Heights.

GCEMS was launched in September 2007 with the goal of providing emergency medical services to county residents within nine minutes from the time of dispatch 90 percent of the time, which is considered to be the gold standard in EMS services. The program currently has 56 ambulances in service around the clock and four power shift ambulances on duty from 8am to 8pm seven days a week. GCEMS operates three Quick Response Vehicles (QRV) units that based in West Deptford Township, Newfield, and South Harrison Township. The department operates from 19 stations throughout the county. GCEMS administrative offices are located at the county's Emergency Response Center in Clayton. It was the winner of the 2010 Outstanding Public EMS Agency by the State of New Jersey.

Gloucester County's special weapons and tactics (SWAT) unit includes police officers from Gloucester County and provides emergency services for SWAT-oriented scenarios, including barricaded and suicidal subjects, hostage rescues, high-risk warrant service, dignitary protection, and counterterrorism responses.

=== Heroin overdoses ===
In 2014, heroin overdose rate in Gloucester County was 17.3 deaths per 100,000 people, the fourth-highest rate in New Jersey and nearly seven times the national average.

== Notable people ==
- Corey Clement (born 1994), former professional football player, Dallas Cowboys, New York Giants, and Philadelphia Eagles (Glassboro)
- Danielson, American Indie pop band (Clarksboro)
- Linda Fiorentino (born 1958 or 1960), actress (Mantua Township)
- Grace Helbig (born 1985), comedian, actress, author, talk show host, and YouTube personality (Woodbury)
- Michael Johns (born 1964), health care executive, former White House presidential speechwriter, conservative policy analyst and writer (Deptford Township)
- Tara Lipinski (born 1982), Olympic gold medal winner, figure skating (Sewell)
- Bryant McKinnie (born 1979), former professional football player, Baltimore Ravens, Miami Dolphins, and Minnesota Vikings (Woodbury)
- J. Hampton Moore (1864–1950), former mayor of Philadelphia (Woodbury).
- Milt Plum (born 1935), former professional football player, Cleveland Browns, Detroit Lions, Los Angeles Rams, and New York Giants (Westville)
- Jimmy Rollins (born 1978), former professional baseball player, Chicago White Sox, Los Angeles Dodgers, and Philadelphia Phillies (Woolwich Township)
- Stephen Mallozzi (born 2001), NASCAR Camping World Truck Series driver for Reaume Brothers Racing (Swedesboro)
- Patti Smith (born 1946), punk rock musician (Deptford Township)
- Steve Squyres (born 1956), former professor, Cornell University, and principal investigator of the Mars Exploration Rover mission (Wenonah)
- Charles C. Stratton (1796–1859), New Jersey governor and former Member of Congress (Swedesboro)

== Recreation ==
=== Gloucester County Historical Society ===
The Gloucester County Historical Society, founded in 1903, maintains a collection of materials and artifacts related to the history of South Jersey. Hunter–Lawrence–Jessup House in Woodbury displays many of these artifacts.

=== Edelman Fossil Park & Museum ===
The Edelman Fossil Park & Museum of Rowan University, in Mantua Township, is one of the county's largest visitor attractions. Rowan purchased the former Inversand Company marl quarry in 2015 and built a $73 million, 44,000-square-foot (4,100 m^{2}) museum on the 65-acre (26 ha) site, funded in part by a $25 million gift from alumni Jean and Ric Edelman. The museum, led by paleontologist Kenneth Lacovara, opened on March 29, 2025, above a quarry preserving fossils from the mass extinction 66 million years ago, and was expected to draw about 200,000 visitors a year. It is New Jersey's largest public net-zero facility.

=== National protected area ===
- Great Egg Harbor River (part)

== See also ==
- National Register of Historic Places listings in Gloucester County, New Jersey
