= Kingsway Regional School District =

Regional high school district in Gloucester County, New Jersey General Assembly

Address
- 213 Kings Highway Woolwich Township, Gloucester County, New Jersey, 08085
- Coordinates: 39.748539°N 75.332887°W

District information
- Grades: 7-12
- Established: 1963
- Superintendent: James J. Lavender
- Business administrator: Jason Schimpf
- Schools: 2

Students and staff
- Enrollment: 2,962 (as of 2022–23)
- Faculty: 208.0 FTEs
- Student–teacher ratio: 14.2:1

Other information
- District Factor Group: FG
- Website: www.krsd.org
Ind.	Per pupil	District spending	Rank (*)	7-12 average	%± vs. average
1A	Total Spending	$15,225	1	$18,891	−19.4%
1	Budgetary Cost	10,737	1	14,586	−26.4%
2	Classroom Instruction	6,094	1	8,339	−26.9%
6	Support Services	1,417	2	2,114	−33.0%
8	Administrative Cost	1,324	3	1,561	−15.2%
10	Operations & Maintenance	1,511	6	1,798	−16.0%
13	Extracurricular Activities	390	1	673	−42.1%
16	Median Teacher Salary	50,938	1	65,769
Data from NJDoE 2014 Taxpayers' Guide to Education Spending. *Of 7-12 districts with any number of students. Lowest spending=1; Highest=47

The Kingsway Regional School District is a regional public school district serving students from five communities in Gloucester County, in the U.S. state of New Jersey. The district serves students in seventh through twelfth grades from East Greenwich Township, South Harrison Township, Swedesboro and Woolwich Township. Students in ninth through twelfth grades from Logan Township who attend as part of a sending/receiving relationship in which tuition is paid on a per-pupil basis by the Logan Township School District.

As of the 2022–23 school year, the district, comprised of two schools, had an enrollment of 2,962 students and 208.0 classroom teachers (on an FTE basis), for a student–teacher ratio of 14.2:1.

The Kingsway Regional School District is classified by the New Jersey Department of Education as being in District Factor Group "FG", the fourth-highest of eight groupings. District Factor Groups organize districts statewide to allow comparison by common socioeconomic characteristics of the local districts. From lowest socioeconomic status to highest, the categories are A, B, CD, DE, FG, GH, I and J.

== History ==
Designed with 40 classrooms built to accommodate an enrollment of 1,100 and constructed at a cost of $1.75 million on a site covering 65 acres (26 ha), the school opened in September 1963 for an initial enrollment of 675 students in grades 7-12, including students in grades 9-12 who had previously attended Swedesboro High School, which ended operations after 40 years. Prior to the school's opening, students had attended either Sweedesboro High School or Woodstown High School.

Under a 2011 proposal, Kingsway would have merged with its constituent member's K-6 districts to become a full K-12 district, with various options for including Logan Township as part of the consolidated district.

== Schools ==
Schools in the district (with 2022–23 enrollment data from the National Center for Education Statistics) are:

- Kingsway Regional Middle School with 954 students in grades 7-8
  - Brian Tonelli, principal
- Kingsway Regional High School with 1,947 students in grades 9-12
  - Stefanie Fox-Manno, principal

The two schools adjoin each other in Woolwich Township.

== Administration ==
Core members of the district's administration are:

- James J. Lavender, superintendent
- Jason Schimpf, business administrator

== Board of education ==
The district's board of education, comprised of nine elected members, sets policy and oversees the fiscal and educational operation of the district through its administration. As a Type II school district, the board's trustees are elected directly by voters to serve three-year terms of office on a staggered basis, with three seats up for election each year held (since 2012) as part of the November general election. The board appoints a superintendent to oversee the district's day-to-day operations and a business administrator to supervise the business functions of the district. Seats on the board of education are allocated based on the population of the constituent districts, with four seats assigned to Woolwich Township, three to East Greenwich Township and one each to South Harrison Township and Swedesboro. The Logan Township district appoints a member to serve on the Kingsway board.
