= Walter L. Stewart Jr. =

US Army major general

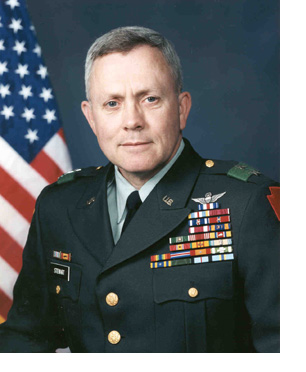
- Stewart as a major general in 1995
- Born: July 17, 1944 (age 82); Camden, New Jersey, US
- Alma mater: Temple University; Albright College; United States Army Command and General Staff College
- Spouse: Sheila Ann Hughes (m. 1968)
- Children: 3
- Military career
- Service: United States Army; Pennsylvania Army National Guard
- Service years: 1966–2000
- Rank: Major General
- Units: United States Army Aviation Branch; United States Army Infantry Branch
- Commands: 28th Infantry Division; 28th Aviation Brigade; 28th Aviation Battalion; Company A, 28th Aviation Battalion
- Conflicts: Vietnam War; Operation Joint Endeavor
- Awards: Silver Star; Defense Superior Service Medal; Legion of Merit; Complete List
- Other work: Owner, tour and travel company

Walter L. Stewart Jr. (born 17 July 1944) is a retired United States Army officer. A veteran of the Vietnam War and Operation Joint Endeavor, he attained the rank of major general as Director for Mobilization and Reserve Component Affairs at United States European Command from 1994 to 1996, the first National Guard major general mobilized for federal service since the Berlin Crisis of 1961. Stewart commanded the 28th Infantry Division from 1996 to 1998, and his awards included the Silver Star, Defense Superior Service Medal, and Legion of Merit.

A native of Camden, New Jersey, Stewart was raised and educated in Glassboro and received an associate's degree from Temple University. He enlisted in the army in 1966. He completed Officer Candidate School in 1967 and received his commission as a second lieutenant. He was qualified in Aviation and Infantry, and served in Aviation units in South Vietnam during the Vietnam War (July 1969 to August 1970).

Stewart subsequently moved to Bernville, Pennsylvania, where he owned and operated a tour and travel business. He joined the Pennsylvania Army National Guard in 1973, and he served in Aviation units including command at the battalion and brigade level. He was a 1981 graduate of the United States Army Command and General Staff College, and he completed his bachelor's degree at Albright College in 1990.

From 1994 to 1996, Stewart served at the United States European Command from October 1994 to 1996, including support of Operation Joint Endeavor. He commanded the 28th Infantry Division from 1996 to 1998, and from 1998 to his 2000 retirement, he was deputy commander of Pennsylvania's State Area Command. After retiring, Stewart's activities included authoring a memoir of his Vietnam War service and election to the North Heidelberg Township Board of Supervisors.

== Early life ==
Walter Lewis Stewart Jr. was born in Camden, New Jersey on 17 July 1944, the son of Walter L. Stewart Sr. and Esther (Heil) Stewart. He was raised and educated in Glassboro, and he graduated from Franklinville's Delsea Regional High School in 1962. His family subsequently moved to Quakertown, Pennsylvania, and he attended Temple University's Technical Institute, from which he received an Associate of Arts degree in mechanical engineering in 1966.

In June 1966, Stewart enlisted in the United States Army. After completing basic training at Fort Dix, New Jersey, he was assigned to Fort Monmouth, New Jersey, where he was trained as a microwave radio operator. Stewart was subsequently selected for officer training and attended Officer Candidate School at Fort Benning, Georgia. He went on to become qualified in both the Aviation and Infantry branches.

== Start of career ==
From December 1967 to July 1969, Stewart served at Fort Devens, Massachusetts, where his assignments included training officer (December 1967 to February 1968), maintenance officer (February to April 1968), assistant family housing officer (April to May 1968), and a second posting as maintenance officer (May 1968 to July 1969). He was promoted to first lieutenant in December 1968.

Stewart served in South Vietnam during the Vietnam War, and his postings included Section Commander, 121st Aviation Company (July to August 1969), Assistant Platoon Commander, 121st Aviation Company (August to October 1969), Platoon Commander, 121st Aviation Company (October to December 1969), Assistant Platoon Commander, 121st Aviation Company (December 1969 to February 1970), and Platoon Commander, 162nd Aviation Company (February to August 1970). After returning to the United States, he was posted to Fort Stewart, Georgia, where he served as executive officer of Company D, 2nd Aircraft Maintenance Battalion from August to December 1970. From December 1970 to January 1971, he was plans officer on the staff of Third United States Army's Aircraft Maintenance Brigade. He was the brigade's assistant plans officer from January to July 1971. From July 1971 to January 1972, he completed his regular army service as the brigade's assistant operation and training officer.

== Continued career ==
From January 1972 to July 1973, Stewart was assigned to the United States Army Reserve Control Group. In his civilian career, he was a resident of Bernville, Pennsylvania, where he became the owner and operator of a tour and travel company. In July 1973, he was promoted to captain and joined the Pennsylvania Army National Guard. His initial assignment was commander of Service Platoon, Troop N, 104th Cavalry Regiment, 28th Infantry Division in Lancaster. In April 1975 he was assigned as executive officer of Company A, 28th Aviation Battalion, 28th Infantry Division in Harrisburg.

Stewart commanded Company A, 28th Aviation Battalion from October 1975 to November 1977, and he was promoted to major in November 1977. From November November 1977 to May 1981 he served as the 28th Aviation Battalion's plans, operations and training officer (S-3). In 1981, he graduated from the United States Army Command and General Staff College. He served as the battalion's executive officer from May 1981 to September 1982. From September 1982 to September 1984, Stewart served as the aviation training officer at the Pennsylvania National Guard's State Area Command, and he was promoted to lieutenant colonel in December 1982.

From September 1984 to September 1986, Stewart commanded the 28th Aviation Battalion. He commanded the 28th Aviation Brigade from September 1986 to February 1991. In October 1986, he received promotion to colonel. In 1990, he received his Bachelor of Science degree in accounting from Albright College.

== Later career ==
In February 1991, Stewart was appointed as Pennsylvania's assistant adjutant general for army, and he was promoted to brigadier general in May 1991. From December 1993 to October 1994, he served as the 28th Infantry Division's assistant division commander for support. From October 1994 to October 1996, he was mobilized for federal active duty as director for mobilization and reserve component affairs at the United States European Command (EUCOM). He was promoted to major general in June 1995, and his assignment at EUCOM made him the first National Guard major general to be mobilized for federal service since the Berlin Crisis of 1961. His mobilization included support Operation Joint Endeavor, the Implementation Force (IFOR) that enforced peace in Bosnia and Herzegovina following the end of the Bosnian War. From October 1996 to November 1998, Stewart commanded the 28th Infantry Division. From November 1998 until retiring in May 2000, he served as deputy commander of Pennsylvania's State Area Command, the same position held by Joseph F. Perugino, his successor as division commander.

Following his military retirement, Stewart authored numerous magazine articles and newspaper editorials on military readiness and defense policy. In addition, he authored a book about his Vietnam War service, 2023's Jefferson's Angels: How ending the draft doomed the American Republic. In 2005, he was a successful Republican candidate for the North Heidelberg Township Board of Supervisors. He also took part in veterans' activities, including speaking at events to honor veterans of World War II.

== Awards ==
=== Federal awards ===
Stewart's federal awards and decorations included:

- Silver Star
- Defense Superior Service Medal
- Legion of Merit
- Distinguished Flying Cross with 1 bronze oak leaf cluster
- Bronze Star Medal with 1 bronze oak leaf cluster
- Meritorious Service Medal
- Air Medal with numeral 31
- Army Commendation Medal with 1 bronze oak leaf cluster
- Army Good Conduct Medal
- Army Reserve Components Achievement Medal
- National Defense Service Medal with 1 bronze service star
- Vietnam Service Medal
- Armed Forces Reserve Medal
- Army Service Ribbon
- Army Reserve Components Overseas Training Ribbon
- Vietnam Campaign Medal with 60 Device
- Republic of Vietnam Cross of Gallantry with 1 silver star
- Master Army Aviator Badge
- Overseas Service Bar (2)

=== State awards ===
Among Stewart's state awards were:

- Pennsylvania Service Ribbon
- Pennsylvania 20 Year Medal
- Pennsylvania MG Thomas. R. White Medal
- Pennsylvania GEN Thomas. J. Stewart Medal

== Dates of rank ==
Stewart's dates of rank included:

- Major General, Army National Guard, 22 June 1995
- Brigadier General, Army National Guard, 15 May 1991
- Colonel, Army National Guard, 1 October 1986
- Lieutenant Colonel, Army National Guard, 3 December 1982
- Major, Army National Guard, 22 February 1977
- Captain, Army National Guard, 14 July 1973
- First Lieutenant, Army of the United States, 4 December 1969
- First Lieutenant, United States Army Reserve, 3 December 1969
- First Lieutenant, Army of the United States, 4 December 1968
- Second Lieutenant, United States Army Reserve, 4 December 1967
