= John Packer (disambiguation) =

John Packer is an English bishop.

John Packer may also refer to:

- John Black Packer (1824–1891), American politician
- John Hayman Packer (1730–1806), British actor
- John Packer (chemist) (1899–1971), New Zealand chemistry professor and prominent administrator at the University of Canterbury
