= Brenton Wallace =

American architect and army general

Major General Brenton G. Wallace
- Born: Brenton Greene Wallace; June 28, 1891; Philadelphia, Pennsylvania, US
- Died: June 3, 1968 (aged 76); Bryn Mawr, Pennsylvania
- Burial place: Valley Forge Memorial Gardens
- Education: University of Pennsylvania
- Spouse: Dorothy Harriet Wallower (m. 1920–1968)
- Military career
- Allegiance: United States of America
- Branch: United States Army; Pennsylvania Army National Guard
- Service years: 1917–1919, 1941–1945
- Rank: Brigadier general
- Commands: 166th Field Artillery
- Wars: World War I World War II
- Awards: Legion of Merit; Croix de Guerre; Order of the British Empire

Brenton Greene Wallace (Note: Some references give his middle name as George) (June 28, 1891 – June 3, 1968) was an American architect and army veteran.

== Biography ==
Wallace was born in Philadelphia in the state of Pennsylvania. His parents were Richard H. Wallace and Lorena DeVoe Broesbeck. He was educated at the University of Pennsylvania and graduated with a B.S. in economics in 1913. In 1914 he co-founded an architectural firm, Wallace & Warner with partner Frederick Warner. The firm gained notoriety for designing houses for suburbs forming along Philadelphia's Main Line. His firm specialized in housing styles such as Cotswold, Norman Farmhouse and Pennsylvania Farmhouse. Wallace also founded the Main Line Builders Association and was its first president.

In 1917 Wallace joined the 107th Field Artillery and served in France during World War I. He was reactivated for service during World War II and he commanded the 166th Field Artillery Regiment. He was seconded to Operations and Training staff of General Patton's 3rd Army as assistant chief of staff in charge of liaison officers. He was promoted to brigadier general before the end of the war. In 1946 he wrote one of the first historical narratives of the war entitled Patton and His Third Army. It was a popular book and went through five printings. During his service he received a number of citations, including five battle stars in France, the Legion of Merit, the Bronze Star, Croix de Guerre with the Star of Vermeil and the Order of the British Empire. After World War II Wallace returned to Pennsylvania and remained active in the National Guard, commanding the 28th Infantry Division Artillery, and later received promotion to major general as the division commander.

After the war he returned to his architectural business. At this time he specialized in commercial and industrial design, including shopping centers and department stores. Some of his notable designs include the Bryn Mawr Medical Building, Haverford Square Shopping Center and Wynnewood Shopping Center.

Wallace was active in the community serving on several boards and service organizations, including the American Red Cross, which he chaired from 1947 to 1948. He also served as director of housing for the state of Pennsylvania from 1946 to 1947.

In 1920 he married Dorothy Harriet Wallower. Together they raised two sons and a daughter. Wallace died in 1968 and is buried at Valley Forge Memorial Gardens in Pennsylvania.
