= General Dougherty =

General Dougherty may refer to:

- Charles B. Dougherty (1860–1924), Pennsylvania Army National Guard major general
- Ivan Dougherty (1907–1998), Australian Army major general
- Russell E. Dougherty (1920–2007), U.S. Air Force four-star general
