= Wendell P. Bowman =

US army major general (1847–1928)

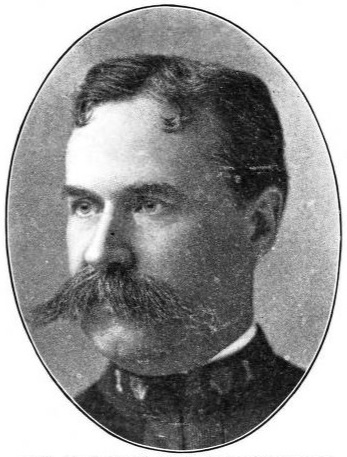
- From 1902's Philadelphia and Notable Philadelphians
- Born: October 31, 1847; Byberry, Pennsylvania, US
- Died: April 8, 1928 (aged 80); Merion Station, Pennsylvania, US
- Burial place: Merion Friends Burial Ground, Merion Station, Pennsylvania, US
- Spouse: Elizabeth W. "Lizzie" Malcolm (m. 1876–1928)
- Military career
- Allegiance: Union; United States
- Service: Union Army; United States Army
- Service years: 1861–1865 (Union Army); 1877–1910 (National Guard)
- Rank: Major General
- Unit: Pennsylvania National Guard
- Commands: Company H, 1st Pennsylvania Militia Infantry Regiment; 1st Pennsylvania Militia Infantry Regiment; 1st Pennsylvania Militia Brigade; Pennsylvania National Guard Division
- Wars: American Civil War; Spanish–American War
- Other work: Attorney

Wendell P. Bowman (October 31, 1847 – April 8, 1928) was a major general in the Pennsylvania National Guard, and served as commander of the 28th Infantry Division.

== Early life ==
Wendell Phillips Bowman was born in Byberry, Pennsylvania on October 31, 1847, the son of Henry Bowman and Grace (Bartine) Bowman. Bowman's father was a temperance advocate and opponent of slavery, and he named his son after the famous abolitionist Wendell Phillips. He lived at his family's home, "Cream Ridge," and was educated at the Benjamin Rush School and the Byberry Friends' School.

He was still a boy when the American Civil War broke out in 1861, and was too young for military service, so he became a drummer for a militia unit, the Byberry Guards. At age 15 he joined the 44th Pennsylvania Militia, which was later mustered into federal service as a unit of the Pennsylvania Reserves. He was a participant in the 1863 Battle of Gettysburg, and was discharged later in 1863. In July, 1864 Bowman joined the 197th Pennsylvania Infantry, and he served until November.

He then joined an Iowa regiment, in which he served until being discharged for ill health. Bowman was unable to walk as a result of his illness and complications caused by the harsh conditions of his service, and used crutches until he was able to begin walking unaided again in 1874.

After the war Bowman studied law in the firm of George H. Earle, Sr. and Richard P. White (brother and husband of Caroline Earle White), attained admission to the bar in 1872, and practiced in Philadelphia. Bowman was active in the Grand Army of the Republic, and served as Judge Advocate of the Department of Pennsylvania. He was also a sought after speech maker, and gave orations for Pennsylvania's Republican Party, Decoration Day commemorations, and other celebrations. On April 18, 1876 Bowman married Elizabeth (Lizzie) W. Malcolm (died October 26, 1929), the daughter of Baptist clergyman Thomas Shields Malcolm.

== Continued career ==
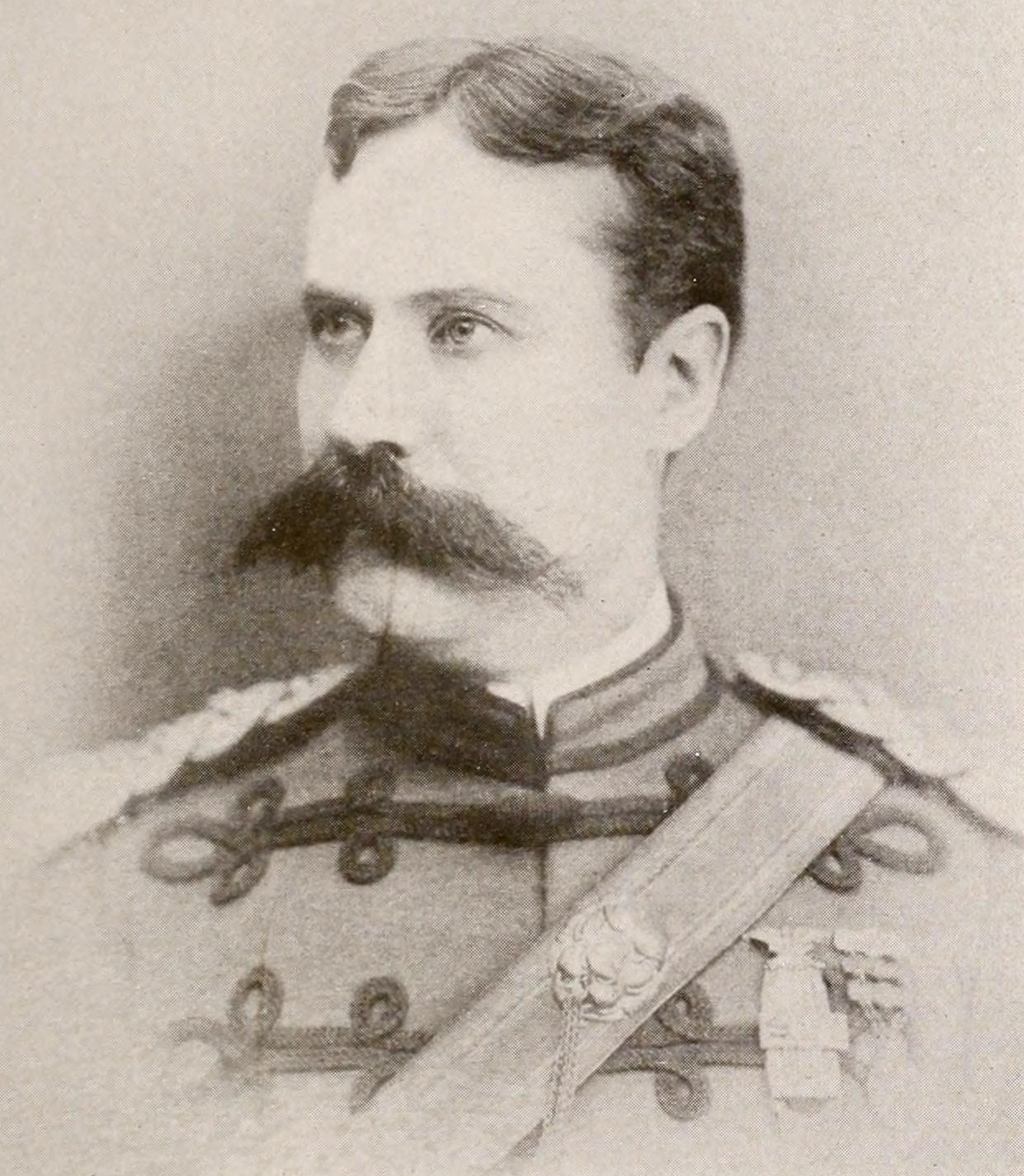
Bowman in 1898's Memorial History of the City of Philadelphia

In 1877 Bowman joined the 20th Pennsylvania Regiment, which was organized to respond to labor unrest during the Great Railroad Strike of 1877. In 1878 he received a commission as a captain in command of Company H, 1st Regiment, Pennsylvania National Guard. He advanced through the ranks to major in November 1879, and lieutenant colonel in October 1885. He became regimental commander with the rank of colonel in 1887.

Bowman volunteered for the Spanish–American War and his regiment was mustered into federal service in 1898. He was seriously injured when he was thrown from his horse during training at Mount Gretna on May 2, 1898, and was unable to lead the regiment when it departed Pennsylvania. As a result, command passed to his lieutenant colonel, J. Lewis Good.

The war ended before the 1st Pennsylvania departed for Cuba, and the regiment returned from its Tennessee encampment to Pennsylvania to be mustered out. Having recovered from his injury, Bowman resumed command after the regiment returned to Pennsylvania.

In August 1907 Bowman became commander of Pennsylvania's 1st Brigade as a brigadier general. In March 1910 he became commander of the Pennsylvania National Guard Division, the organization later known as the 28th Infantry Division, and he was promoted to major general. He served until retiring in October 1910, and was succeeded by Charles B. Dougherty. Bowman died at his home "The Elms" in Merion Station, Pennsylvania on April 8, 1928, and was buried at Merion Friends Burial Ground.
