= 197th Pennsylvania Infantry Regiment =

Union Army infantry regiment

197th Pennsylvania Volunteer Infantry
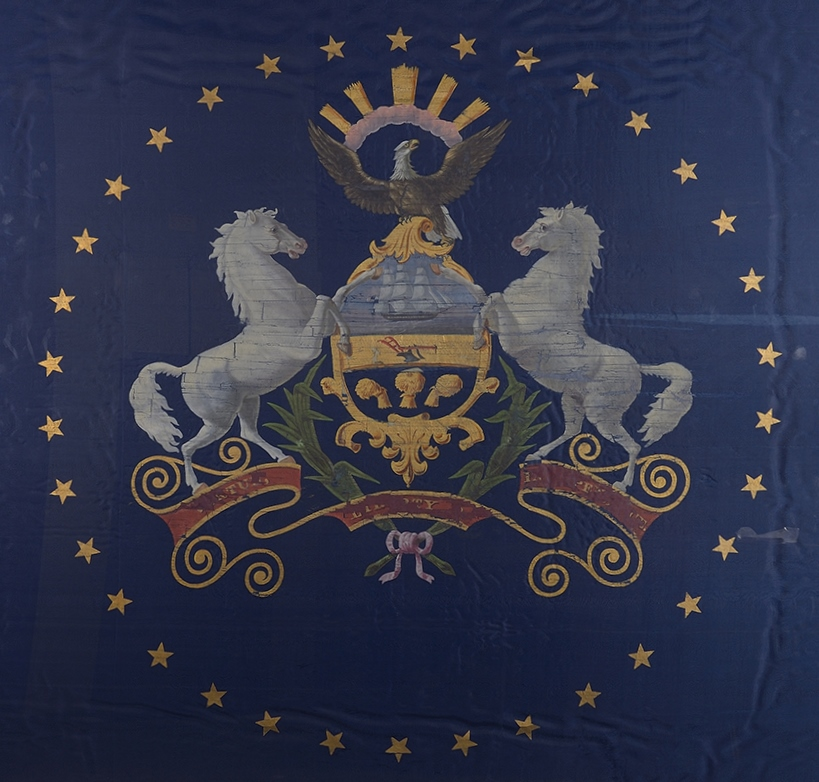
- State Flag of Pennsylvania, circa 1863.
- Active: 22 July – 11 November 1864
- Country: United States of America
- Allegiance: Union
- Branch: Union Army
- Role: Infantry
- Size: 932 officers and men (total enrollment)

The 197th Regiment Pennsylvania Volunteer Infantry, alternately the 3rd Coal Exchange Regiment was an infantry regiment of the Union Army in the American Civil War. Raised in Philadelphia in mid-1864, the regiment was made up of Hundred Days Men in an effort to augment existing manpower for an all-out push to end the war within 100 days, and spent most of its service guarding Confederate prisoners of war at Rock Island.

== History ==
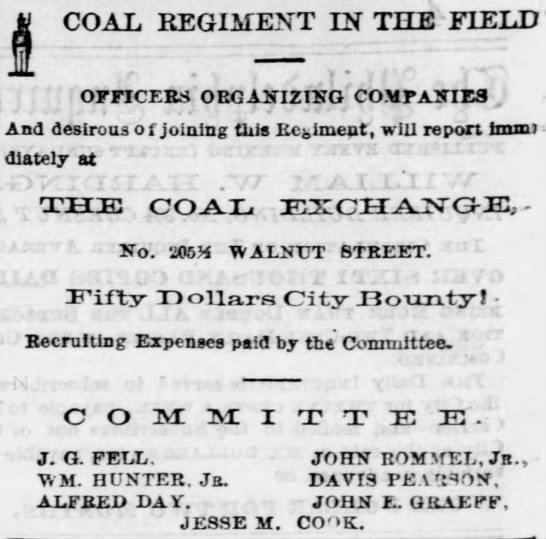
A newspaper recruiting advertisement for the regiment, showing the bounty offered

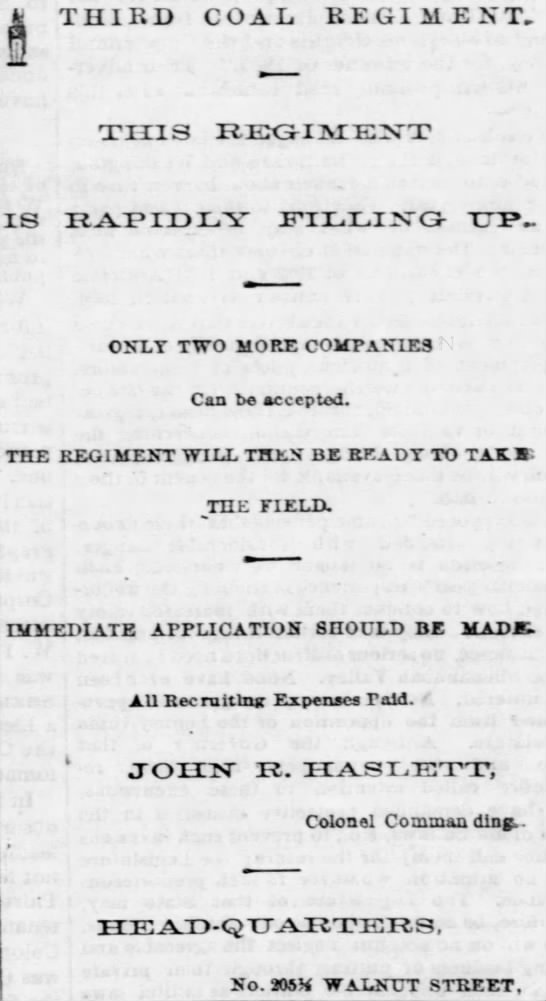
A newspaper recruiting advertisement for the regiment

The regiment was organized at Camp Cadwalader near Philadelphia on 22 July 1864, under the command of volunteer officer Colonel John R. Haslett, who had worked as a house painter before the war. It was alternately known as the 3rd Coal Exchange Regiment due to its having been organized with the assistance of the Coal Exchange Association of Philadelphia, and had a total enrollment of 932. All companies were recruited in Philadelphia, except for a portion of one company in Montgomery County. According to Samuel Penniman Bates' official history, "a large proportion" of the regiment were "well schooled soldiers." Shortly after its organization, the regiment was sent to Camp Bradford at Mankin's Woods near Baltimore on 29 July, where it trained for two weeks. From there, it entrained for Rock Island in August to guard Confederate prisoners of war. The number of guards was insufficient for the task, and this placed pressure on the 197th, which repeated the 133rd Illinois Infantry's practice of firing upon prisoners, but was otherwise undistinguished. The regiment returned to Philadelphia at the end of its term, and was mustered out there on 11 November. During its service, six men of the regiment died of disease.

== Notable personnel ==
Emmet Crawford, who later served as a United States Army officer during the Apache Wars, served as first sergeant of Company K. Future Pennsylvania National Guard General Wendell P. Bowman served as a corporal in Company K.

== See also ==
- List of Pennsylvania Civil War regiments
- Pennsylvania in the Civil War
