= Pomfret Manor Cemetery =

Sunbury, Pennsylvania cemetery

- Interactive map of Pomfret Manor Cemetery

Details
- Established: 1870
- Location: 900 Packer Street, Sunbury, Pennsylvania
- Country: United States
- Coordinates: 40.8689°N 76.7799°W
- Find a Grave: Pomfret Manor Cemetery

Pomfret Manor Cemetery is a cemetery located in Sunbury, Pennsylvania. Former members of the United States Congress and U.S. Medal of Honor winners are among the notable interments here.

== History ==
Incorporated as the Mt. Pleasant Cemetery Company on August 4, 1870, this cemetery was officially organized on August 22 of that same year. At that time, the following individuals were appointed as the cemetery's first executive officers: Alexander Jordan, president; J. A. Cake, treasurer; and Lloyd T. Rohrbach, secretary. Other members of the organization's first board of directors were: Rev. George J. Brensinger, Rev. Gideon J. Burton, Rev. W. W. Evans, Rev. George W. Hemperley, Rev. Samuel K. Milliken, and William M. Rockefeller. On June 9, 1873, the cemetery's name was officially changed to Pomfret Manor Cemetery. Nearly two decades later, historian Charles Herbert Bell provided these further details:

The grounds comprise twenty acres, situated within the borough limits of East Sunbury at a considerable elevation above the river. Five acres were improved and adapted to cemetery purposes, and, although some interments were made, the project was for some years practically abandoned. A reorganization of the company was effected August 1, 1890, with the following officers: president, George B. Reimensnyder; secretary and treasurer, W. H. Druckemiller; directors: Rev. George Parson, George B. Reimensnyder, J. H. Alleman, Rev. W. E. Parson, and Ira Shipman. Under the new management, the cemetery promises to become one of the most attractive places of interment in the county.

In April 1915, the cemetery was threatened briefly by the spread of the Shade Mountain Fire, a large forest fire which destroyed hundreds of acres of second-growth timber in Northumberland County and threatened Snyder County's Shade Mountain huckleberry district.

On June 20, 1918, the Sunbury Volunteer Firemen's Association continued its annual tradition of honoring deceased firemen with a parade through Sunbury, which stopped at the Pomfret Manor Cemetery, where the marchers decorated the graves of firemen interred there. Rev. Charles K. Gibson then addressed the crowd and marchers before they moved on for another ceremony at Susquehanna Park.

== Notable interments ==
- Charles C. Bowen, Northumberland County Representative to the Pennsylvania House of Representatives (1905)
- Maj. Gen. Charles M. Clement, first recipient of the U.S. Army's Spanish War Service and Mexican Border Service medals, and commander of the Pennsylvania National Guard's 28th Infantry Division
- Birdie Cree, Major League Baseball outfielder
- Herbert Wesley Cummings, U.S. Congressman (68th session)
- Bvt. Lt. Col. Thomas W. Hoffman, U.S. Medal of Honor recipient
- Isaac Clinton Kline, U.S. Congressman (67th session)
- John Black Packer, Pennsylvania deputy attorney general (1845–1847), member of the Pennsylvania House of Representatives (1850–1851), and U.S. Congressman (42nd and 43rd sessions)
- Simon Peter Wolverton, Pennsylvania senator (1878, 1880, and 1884) and U.S. Congressman (52nd and 53rd sessions)
