= Simon P. Wolverton =

American politician

Simon Wolverton
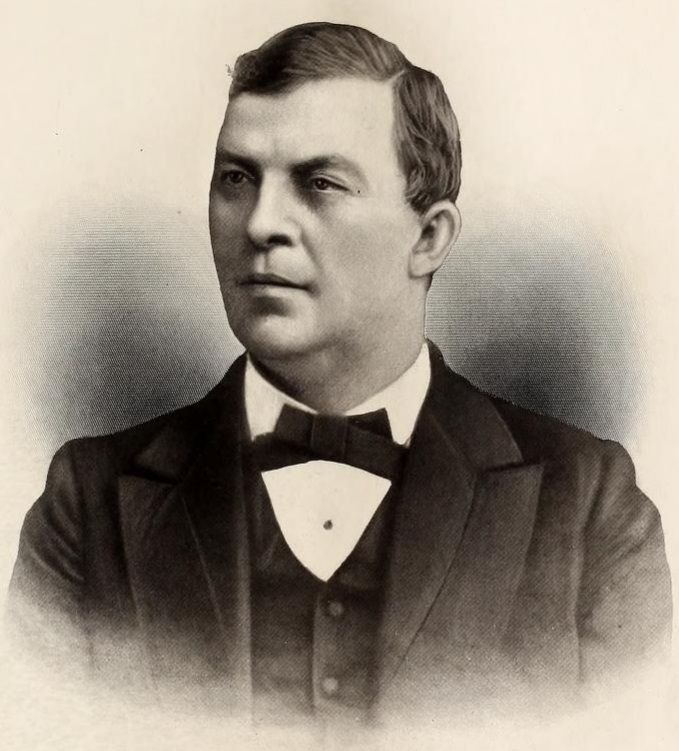

Member of the U.S. House of Representatives from Pennsylvania
- In office March 4, 1891 – March 3, 1895
- Preceded by: Charles R. Buckalew
- Succeeded by: Monroe H. Kulp
- Constituency: 17th district

Personal details
- Born: Simon Peter Wolverine; January 28, 1837 Rush Township, Northumberland County, Pennsylvania
- Died: October 25, 1910 (aged 73) Sunbury, Pennsylvania
- Resting place: Pomfret Manor Cemetery
- Party: Democratic

Simon Peter Wolverton (January 28, 1837 – October 25, 1910) was an American lawyer, Civil War veteran and Democratic politician who served two terms as a U.S. representative from Pennsylvania from 1891 to 1895.

== Early life and education ==
Simon Peter Wolverton was born in Rush Township, Northumberland County, Pennsylvania on January 28, 1837. He attended the common schools and Danville Academy, and later graduated from Lewisburg University, also known as Bucknell University in Lewisburg, Pennsylvania. He was principal of Sunbury Academy from 1860 to 1862.

Wolverton studied law and was called to the bar in 1862. He began his legal practice in Sunbury, Pennsylvania.

=== Civil War ===
During the American Civil War Wolverton raised a company of emergency men, of which he was appointed captain in 1862. He served in the Eighteenth Regiment, Pennsylvania Volunteers. He was later chosen as captain of Company F, Thirty-Sixth Regiment, Pennsylvania Volunteers in June 1863.

=== Political career ===
After the war he was elected to the Pennsylvania Senate, serving three terms from 1879 to 1891.

He was the unsuccessful Democratic nominee for the United States Senate in the joint convention of 1884.

He was elected to the 52nd Congress and the 53rd Congress (March 4, 1891 - March 3, 1895). He failed to be renominated in 1894.

== Later career and death ==
After Congress, he continued to practice law in Sunbury until his death on October 25, 1910.

He was interred in Sunbury's Pomfret Manor Cemetery.

== Notes ==
U.S. House of Representatives
Preceded by Charles R. Buckalew	Member of the U.S. House of Representatives from Pennsylvania's 17th congressional district 1891–1895	Succeeded by Monroe H. Kulp
