= 104th Aviation Regiment (United States) =

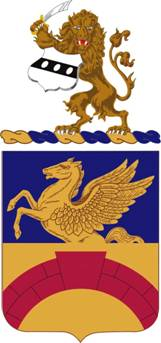
- coat of arms
- Country: USA
- Branch: United States Army Aviation Branch
- Type: Aviation
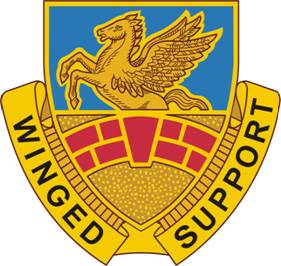
- Distinctive unit insignia

Aircraft flown
- Cargo helicopter: CH-47F Chinook
- Utility helicopter: UH-60L/HH-60M Black Hawk

The 104th Aviation Regiment is an aviation regiment of the U.S. Army, primarily provided by the Army National Guard.

Both battalions of the regiment are part of the Combat Aviation Brigade, 28th Infantry Division. The 1st Battalion is an attack helicopter battalion of the Pennsylvania Army National Guard.

The 2d Battalion, 104th Aviation Regiment was formed in October, 1990 at Fort Indiantown Gap as an assault helicopter battalion. The 2nd Battalion exchanged its Bell UH-1 Hueys (as an aviation battalion) for Sikorsky UH-60 Blackhawks (as a general support aviation battalion) in 2002.

== Structure ==
- 1st Battalion - disbanded 2016
  - Company C (WV ARNG)
- 2nd Battalion (General Support)
  - Headquarters and Headquarters Company
    - Detachment 2 (CT ARNG), Aviation Support Facility, Windsor Locks, Connecticut
    - Detachment 3 (WV ARNG)
  - Company A (UH-60)
  - Company B (CH-47F) at Army Aviation Support Facility at Bradley International Airport (CT ARNG)
    - Detachment 1 (CT ARNG), Aviation Support Facility, Windsor Locks, Connecticut
  - Company C (HH-60M) at Army Aviation Support Facility #1, Mid-Ohio Valley Regional Airport (WV ARNG)
  - Company D (Engineering)
    - Detachment 2 (CT ARNG), Windsor Locks, Connecticut
    - Detachment 3 (WV ARNG)
  - Company E
    - Detachment 2 (CT ARNG), Windsor Locks, Connecticut
    - Detachment 3 (WV ARNG)
  - Company F (Air Traffic Services) at Muir Army Airfield, Fort Indiantown Gap, Pennsylvania (PA ARNG), primarily staffed by air traffic control operators (MOS 15Q)
  - Company G (UH-60L) at Army Aviation Support Facility #1 at Lincoln Airport (NE ARNG).
    - Detachment 2
