= Charles M. Clement =

United States Army general and politician

Charles Maxwell Clement
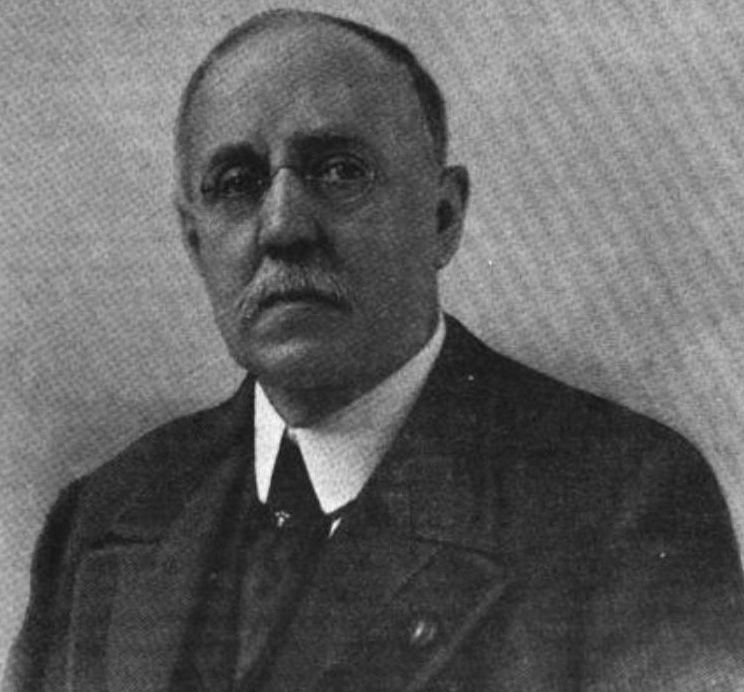
- Born: October 28, 1855; Sunbury, Pennsylvania, U.S.
- Died: September 9, 1934 (aged 78); Sunbury, Pennsylvania, U.S
- Military career
- Allegiance: United States of America
- Branch: United States Army
- Service years: 1877–1917
- Rank: Major general
- Unit: Pennsylvania Army National Guard
- Commands: 12th Pennsylvania Infantry Regiment; 3rd Brigade, 28th Infantry Division; 28th Infantry Division
- Conflicts: Spanish–American War; Pancho Villa Expedition; World War I
- Awards: Spanish War Service Medal (First recipient); Mexican Border Service Medal (First recipient)
- Other work: Attorney

Charles Maxwell Clement (October 28, 1855 – September 9, 1934) was a Pennsylvania attorney and Army National Guard officer who attained the rank of major general as commander of the 28th Infantry Division.

== Early life ==
Charles M. Clement was born in Sunbury, Pennsylvania on October 28, 1855, the son of John Kay Clement and Mary S. (Zeigler) Clement. He was educated at academies in Sunbury and Burlington, New Jersey, afterwards working as a clerk in the Northumberland County Prothonotary's office. He read law, attained admission to the bar, and commenced practice in Sunbury in 1878.

== Career ==
Clement was also active in business, including serving as President of the Central Railroad of Pennsylvania and attorney for or board of directors member of several utilities and other corporations.

A Republican, he served in various local and county party positions, including Chairman of the Northumberland County Republican Committee. He also held local office, including member of Sunbury's City Council, Assistant Burgess, school board member, and City Solicitor. In the 1890s he served as Deputy Secretary of the Commonwealth.

== Military service ==
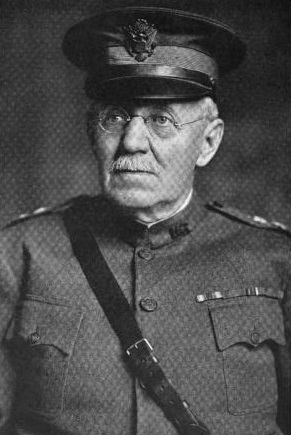
Clement as commander of the 28th Division at the start of WW I.

Clement was an organizer of the Sunbury Guards, a unit which was incorporated into the National Guard as Company E, 12th Pennsylvania Infantry Regiment. Enlisting as a Private in 1877, he was soon commissioned as a Captain, and he commanded the company for several years.

In 1896 he was promoted to major of the 12th Infantry. In 1898 he became the regiment's Lieutenant Colonel and second in command. He served in this position when the regiment was mustered into federal service for the Spanish–American War, and remained until the regiment was discharged in October, 1898.

Remaining in the National Guard after the war, he was promoted to colonel as commander of the 12th Infantry.

In 1910 he was promoted to brigadier general as commander of Pennsylvania's 3rd Infantry Brigade.

Clement was promoted to major general in 1915 and assigned to succeed Charles B. Dougherty as commander of the 28th Infantry Division, then known as the 7th Division. He led the division during its service on the border with Mexico as part of the Pancho Villa Expedition.

At the start of World War I Clement was still in command, though he was nearing retirement age. When the 28th Division was called to active duty, Clement traveled to France to observe front line combat and obtain information on trench warfare techniques so that he could incorporate them into the division's training.

Clement returned to the United States and trained the 28th Division until shortly before it embarked for France. He retired for medical reasons in late 1917, completing over 40 years of military service.

== Awards ==
When the United States Army created the Spanish War Service and Mexican Border Service Medals, Clement was designated as the first official recipient of each, in recognition of his status as the longest-tenured National Guard officer eligible for the medals at the time they were authorized.

== Retirement, death and burial ==
Clement was active in the Masons, Sons of the American Revolution and other fraternal, civic and veterans organizations. In retirement he wrote several articles and gave many speeches on Pennsylvania history, military history and other topics.

He died in Sunbury on September 9, 1934, and was buried in Sunbury's Pomfret Manor Cemetery.

== Family ==
In 1879 Clement married Alice Virginia Withington (1855–1933). They had four sons, John Kay (1880–1971), Martin Withington (1881–1966), Charles Frances (1884–1963) and Theron Ball (1896–1965).

John Kay Clement (Trinity College, 1901, Ph.D. in chemistry, University of Göttingen, 1904) was a career Army officer who served in the Spanish–American War, World War I and World War II, and retired as a colonel.

Martin W. Clement (Trinity College, 1901) was a prominent railroad executive who served as President of the Pennsylvania Railroad. He was a veteran of the Pennsylvania National Guard's 12th Regiment. During World War I he was an advisor to the U.S. Railroad Administration, and he performed a similar function for the War Department during World War II.

Charles F. Clement (Trinity College, 1905, University of Pennsylvania Law School, 1908) was an attorney and business executive who served as President of Philadelphia's Winslow-Knickerbocker Coal Company and attained the rank of colonel as a Pennsylvania National Guard member, including commanding the 28th Infantry Division's Military Police Battalion and serving on the division staff during World War I.

Theron B. Clement (Trinity College, 1917) served in the Pennsylvania National Guard and was a captain and assistant quartermaster with the 28th Infantry Division in World War I. He later pursued a business career, and was an executive with the International Mercantile Marine Company, Transcontinental and Western Air, Union Switch & Signal, and the General Grinding Wheel Corporation.
