= 103rd Engineer Battalion (United States) =

US Army battalion

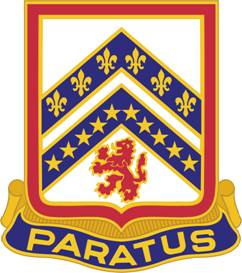
Distinctive Unit Insignia: 103rd Eng Bn

The 103rd Engineer Battalion was an engineer battalion of the United States Army, raised from the Pennsylvania Army National Guard. It was one of several 21st century units with extensive Colonial era roots and campaign credit for the War of 1812.

The 103rd Engineer Battalion traced its origins to the Associators, constituted on 21 November 1747, at Philadelphia by Benjamin Franklin. The original Associators included several companies of artillery, which were combined on 29 December 1747, to form the Train of Artillery of Philadelphia. It is from these artillery companies that the 103rd Engineer Battalion is derived. During the French and Indian War, these companies served at Forts Pitt and Erie.

In 1775 when the Associated Regiment of Foot of Philadelphia was reorganized as the Associators of the City and Liberties of Philadelphia, it included one battalion of artillery. On 1 May 1775, this artillery battalion underwent further reorganization to form the Philadelphia Artillery Battalion under the command of Colonel Samuel Mifflin.

Its Revolutionary War Campaigns include the Trenton, Princeton, Brandywine, Germantown, and New Jersey 1777.

The Philadelphia Artillery Battalion was ordered into Continental Service on 2 July 1776, at Philadelphia, and mustered out in January 1777 at Morristown, New Jersey. During this period, the unit served in New York, Pennsylvania and New Jersey, and participated in the Trenton and Princeton campaigns.

- While remaining in state service, the Philadelphia Artillery Battalion also formed Procter's 4th Company, organized in Philadelphia in October 1775, and was expanded to form the Pennsylvania State Artillery Battalion in August 1776, which was assigned to the Main Continental Army in September 1776. The Pennsylvania State Artillery Battalion was expanded again to form the Pennsylvania State Artillery Regiment in February 1777, and relieved from the Main Continental Army. On 10 June 1777, the Pennsylvania State Artillery Regiment was adopted into the Continental Army as Procter's Continental Artillery Regiment, which became the 4th Continental Artillery Regiment in 1783.

At the Battle of Fort Washington, Margaret ("Captain Molly") Corbin, the wife on an enlisted man in one of the companies of the Philadelphia Artillery Battalion, became the first American woman to be wounded on the battlefield and later the first woman to be paid a pension by the U. S. government for her service. When her husband, John Corbin, was killed during the assault on Fort Tryon, a small outer redoubt of Fort Washington, she took his place in the gun crew, cleaning and loading the cannon. She was seriously wounded by grapeshot shortly before the Hessians overran the battery. Margaret was put on the rolls of the Invalid Regiment at West Point. She died in Highland Fall, New York, in 1800 at the age of 49; her gravesite is unknown however there is a memorial to her in the post cemetery.

Another story about another "Molly" who distinguished herself on the battlefield has come down to us from the Battle of Monmouth, which was fought on a sweltering day in late June 1778. According to the legend of Molly Pitcher, Mary Hays, the wife of William Hays, a soldier in Proctor's 4th Continental Artillery, was bringing pitchers of water from a nearby spring to the cannon crews when she saw her husband collapse. Mary is then reported to have picked up the rammer, joined the gun crew, and continued to work the cannon for the rest of the battle. It is further reported that for her heroism General Washington warranted her as a non-commissioned officer and awarded her a pension for life. There are eyewitness accounts that verify that Mary was present at the battle, that there was a woman bringing water to the cannon crews, and that a woman was seen assisting her husband at a gun. There is no record of any woman receiving a military title after the battle or any record of Mary receiving a federal pension (although she did receive a pension from the State of Pennsylvania for her war service, not her husband's). Her contemporaries referred to Mary as "Captain Molly" or "Sergeant Molly," not as "Molly Pitcher." The name "Molly Pitcher" appeared in print for the first time in 1837 and was greatly popularized by the painting "Molly Pitcher: Heroine of Monmouth," by Nathaniel Currier. William Hays survived the war, after which he and Mary settled in Carlisle, Pennsylvania. William died in 1789, after which Mary married another Revolutionary War veteran, George McCauley. She died in 1832, and is buried in Carlisle.

Beginning in 1784 and culminating in 1794, Proctor's Artillery Battalion and the Philadelphia Artillery Battalion were consolidated to form the Regiment of Artillery of the City of Philadelphia, which was mustered into federal service during the War of 1812 as the Regiment of Artillery. Thus the Battalion is among Army National Guard units with campaign credit for the War of 1812.

The 103rd Engineer Battalion's lineage was traced to the 1st Regiment, Infantry, Pennsylvania National Guard. This regiment was in federal service on the Mexican Border (during the Pancho Villa Expedition) from June to October 1916. On 5 August 1917, it was drafted into federal service and became the 109th Infantry Regiment. However, it was redesignated to the 1st Infantry, Pennsylvania National Guard in October 1919. The 1st Infantry was converted and redesignated as 103rd Engineer Regiment, an element of the 28th Infantry Division 1 April 1921. The 103rd Engineer Regiment was an element of the Pennsylvania Army National Guard's 28th Division. It was organized and federally recognized in Philadelphia, Pa. 18 July 1921. It was inducted into Federal service for World War II in Philadelphia, Pennsylvania 17 February 1941.

On 17 February 1942, the regiment was broken up and its elements reorganized and redesignated as follows: Regiment (less the 2nd Battalion) as the 103rd Engineer Battalion, an element of the 28th Infantry Division. The 2nd Battalion was redesignated as the 180th Engineer Battalion and relieved from assignment to the 28th Infantry Division.

On 1 August 1942, the 180th Engineer Battalion was redesignated as the 180th Engineer Heavy Pontoon Battalion. On 27 November 1945, the 180th Engineer Heavy Pontoon Battalion was inactivated at Camp Miles Standish, Massachusetts. On 24 May 1946, the 103rd Combat Battalion (the 103rd Engineer Battalion was redesignated the 103rd Combat Battalion 9 March 1943) and the 180th Engineer Heavy Pontoon Battalion consolidated and were designated as the 103rd Engineer Combat Battalion.

The unit was disbanded in March 2026 at Fort Mifflin.

== Shield ==
The shield of the Distinctive Unit Insignia is white to indicate early service as Infantry, whereas service as Infantry during the Civil War and World War I is indicated by the blue chevronelles, blue being the more recent color for Infantry. The red border signifies that the organization is now an Engineer unit. The ten stars represent ten battle honors in the Civil War, while the six fleur-de-lis represent World War I service. The red lion signifies service against the British in the War of 1812.
