= Thomas W. Hoffman =

American Civil War Medal of Honor recipient (1839–1905)

Thomas William Hoffman
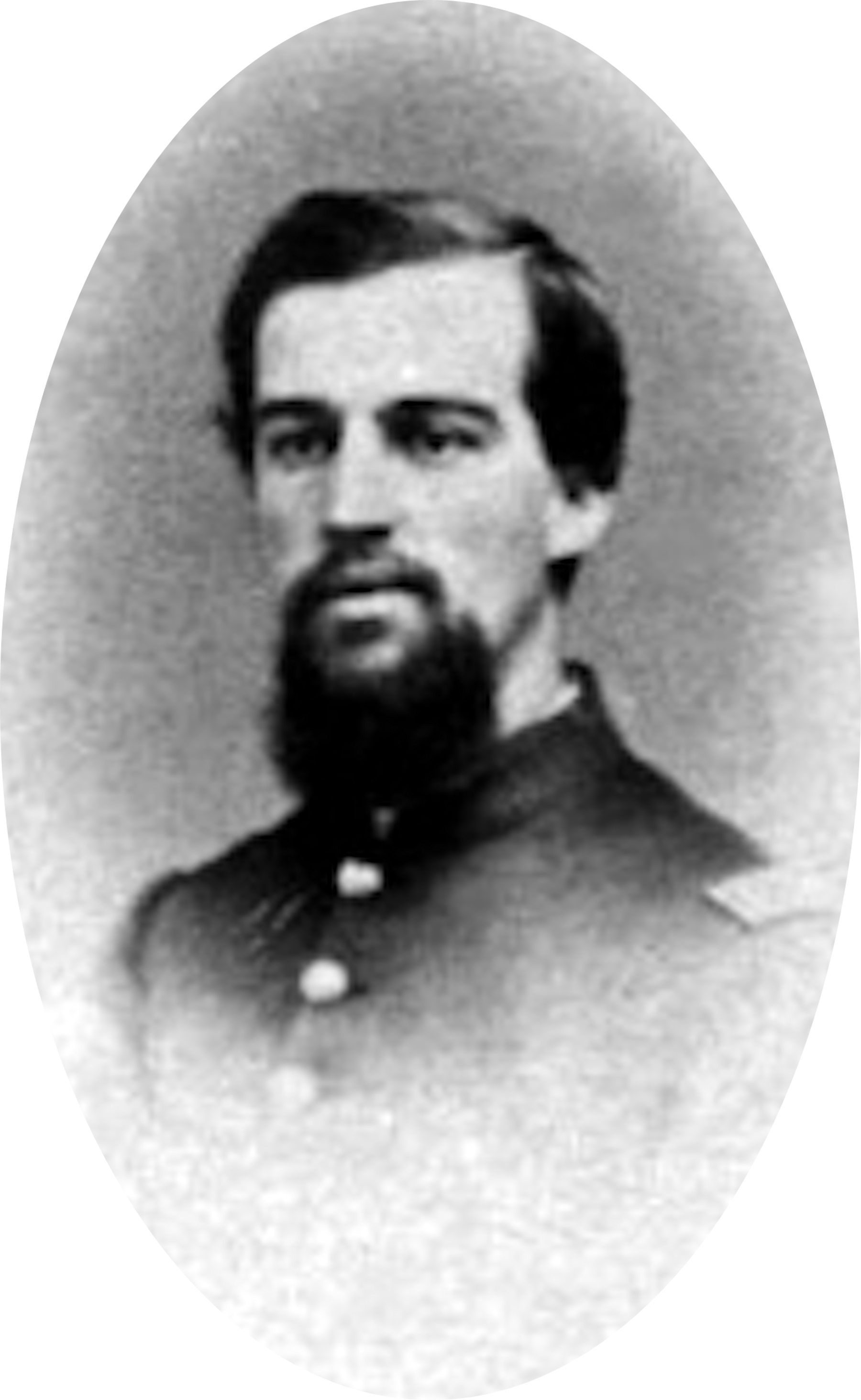
- Hoffman in 1865
- Born: July 21, 1839; Berrysburg, Pennsylvania, US
- Died: April 18, 1905 (aged 65); Scranton, Pennsylvania, US
- Burial place: Pomfret Manor Cemetery, Sunbury, Pennsylvania
- Military career
- Allegiance: United States
- Branch: United States Army
- Rank: Brevet Lieutenant colonel
- Units: 1.) Company E, 72nd Pennsylvania Infantry (1861–1863); 2.) 143rd Company, 2nd Battalion, U.S. Veteran Reserve Corps (1863); 3.) Company A, 208th Pennsylvania Infantry (1864–1865)
- Conflicts: American Civil War
- Awards: Medal of Honor

Thomas William Hoffman (July 21, 1839 – April 18, 1905) was an American soldier who fought with the Union Army as a member of the 208th Pennsylvania Infantry during the American Civil War. He was recognized with his nation's highest military honor, the U.S. Medal of Honor, for his display of "extraordinary heroism" when preventing the retreat of a regiment during the Third Battle of Petersburg, Virginia on April 2, 1865. That award was conferred on July 19, 1895.

== Formative years ==
Born in Berrysburg, Pennsylvania on July 21, 1839, Thomas William Hoffman was a son of Amos Hoffman (1809–1897) and Amanda (Harper) Hoffman (1815–1897). He was reared and educated in Dauphin County with siblings: Jacob Franklin (1841–1916), Edwin (born circa 1845), Henrietta C. (1849–1932), and Adeline H. (1853–1943). His younger brother, Oscar A. (1857–1857), was just two weeks old when he died on May 2, 1857.

In 1850, Thomas Hoffman resided with his parents and siblings, John, Edwin, and Henrietta, on the family's farm in Lykins Township.

== Civil War ==
Battle of Antietam, September 17, 1862, by Thure de Thulstrup.

At the age of 25, Hoffman enlisted for Civil War military service. After enrolling at Philadelphia on August 10, 1861, he then officially mustered in that same day as a private with Company E of the 72nd Pennsylvania Infantry (also known as the "Fire Zouaves"). Transported with his regiment to Virginia, he saw action in the Battle of Ball's Bluff (October 21, 1861), participated in the advances by the Union troops of Major-General Nathaniel P. Banks on Winchester and Yorktown, and fought in the Seven Days Battles of Seven Pines (also known as Fair Oaks, May 31 to June 1, 1862), Savage's Station (June 29, 1862), and Malvern Hill (July 1, 1862) before engaging in the battles of Antietam (September 17, 1862), Fredericksburg (December 12–15, 1862), and Chancellorsville (April 30 to May 6, 1863). On October 1, 1863, he was transferred to the 143rd Company of the 2nd Battalion, U.S. Veteran Reserve Corps (also known as the invalid corps), and was subsequently honorably mustered out.

Returning home to Dauphin County, Hoffman then helped to raise a new regiment, the 208th Pennsylvania Infantry. Re-enrolling for Civil War military service and commissioned as a captain by Pennsylvania Governor Andrew Gregg Curtin in Harrisburg, Pennsylvania on September 7, 1864, he was then placed in charge that same day of Company A of that regiment. His younger brother, Jacob, served under him in Company A.

Attached to the Provisional Brigade, Defenses of Bermuda Hundred, U.S. Army of the James, from September to November 1864, Hoffman and his fellow 208th Pennsylvanians performed fatigue and picket duties in the vicinity of Bermuda Hundred, Virginia as part of the operations related to the Siege of Richmond. Reassigned to the Provisional Brigade, 9th U.S. Army Corps' Army of the Potomac for December of that year, they supported the Union's Weldon Railroad Expedition. Reassigned to the 9th Corps' 1st Brigade, 3rd Division, they then fought in the battles of Dabney's Mill and Hatcher's Run (February 5–7, 1865), Fort Stedman (March 25), and in the Appomattox Campaign (March 28 to April 9).

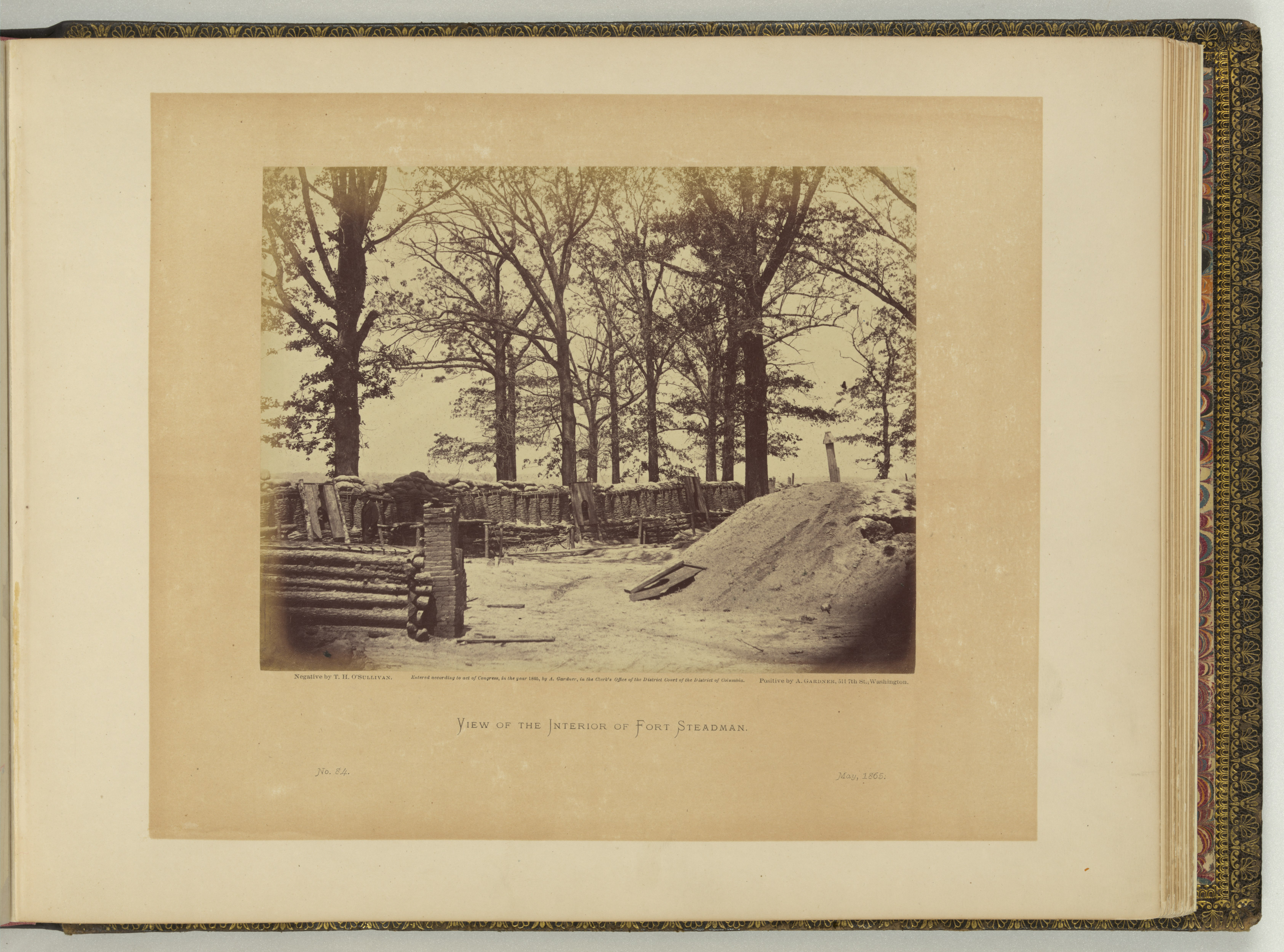
Interior of Fort Stedman, 1865 (T. H. O'Sullivan and A. Gardner).

During the opening days of this latter campaign, Hoffman was detailed, on April 1, as acting engineer officer with the 3rd Division, 9th U.S. Army Corps. The next day, he performed the act of "extraordinary heroism" for which he would later be awarded his nation's highest honor for valor, the U.S. Medal of Honor. Interviewed later in life, Hoffman described what happened that day:

During the week that we were stationed at Steadman our division was ordered to capture Lee's works. I was detailed on General Hartranft's staff as engineer officer of the division.

The troops were ordered out in the middle of the night and deployed inside our picket lines. When daylight began to show on the eastern horizon a signal gun was fired. This was the signal for the attack and our troops advanced to the fray. They rushed across the space between the two lines, tore down the obstructions, jumped into the moat from whence they scaled the walls of the fort, capturing four forts with twenty-five guns in a space of five minutes. We also captured a large number of prisoners.

The rebels made a great effort to retake the forts, making numerous charges, but we succeeded in holding them back during the entire day. Sometime during the afternoon I was sent out by General Hartranft to the commanding officer of the second brigade to ascertain if it were possible for him to hold the forts captured.

Just as I came to the forts it happened that my own regiment, the Two Hundred and Eighth was deployed.... When I was but a short distance away I heard the lieutenant-colonel of my regiment call to the men to retreat, and that they were being surrounded. Presently he and the major of the regiment started on the run for the rear, expecting the regiment to follow. I took the situation at a glance and drawing my sword called to the men at the top of my voice, "Don't a man of you run; they can't drive you out of here."

When the line officers discovered that there was some one to take charge of the regiment they immediately rallied the men and kept them in position.

Recognized for his valor that day, Hoffman was promoted by brevet to the rank of major on March 25. Afterward, the 208th Pennsylvania moved on in pursuit of Confederate General-in-Chief Robert E. Lee's army (April 3–9) and, following Lee's surrender to General Ulysses S. Grant at Appomattox, was involved in Union Operations at Nottaway Court House (April 9–20), City Point (April 20–28), and Alexandria from late April until mid-May when then regiment headed to Washington, D.C. in order to participate in the Union's Grand Review of the Armies (May 23).

On June 1, 1865, Hoffman was honorably when his regiment was mustered out of service. On August 2, 1865, he was recognized for his service to the nation with a brevet promotion to the rank of lieutenant colonel of volunteers. In response, he penned a thank you note from his home at Port Trevorton.

== Post-war life ==
Following his honorable discharge from the military, Hoffman returned home to Pennsylvania. Less than a month later, on June 27, 1865, he wed Sallie F. Shindel (1843–1890) at Saint John's Lutheran Church near Berrysburg in Lykens Township, Dauphin County. A native of Gratz in Dauphin County, she was a daughter of Solomon Shindel, who had served in the Pennsylvania House of Representatives in 1843. Shortly thereafter, Hoffman and his wife welcomed the births of three children: Susan, Mary (also known as "Mamie"), and Elizabeth, who were born, respectively, circa 1866, 1868, and 1876.

By 1890, Hoffman had relocated to Northumberland County, Pennsylvania, and was residing in the community of Mount Carmel. That year, he became a widower when his wife, Sallie, died in Mount Carmel on April 2, and was laid to rest at the Pomfret Manor Cemetery in Sunbury, Pennsylvania. Nearly a year to the day later, he remarried, taking Helen Delucia Fisk, M.D. (1848–1941) as his second wife in a wedding ceremony which was held on April 5, 1892, in Dansville, New York, where Fisk, a graduate of the New York Medical College, was employed as a physician by the Jackson Sanitarium.

By the turn of the century, Hoffman was working as a bookkeeper for the Meadow Brook Coal Company, and residing with his second wife at the boarding house operated by Margaret Kries and Marion Cantner at 124 Adams Avenue in Scranton, Pennsylvania.

== Death and interment ==
Hoffman died at the age of 65, on April 18, 1905, in Scranton, Pennsylvania. His remains were carried by train from Lackwanna County to Northumberland County via the Delaware and Hudson Railroad, where he was then laid to rest at the Pomfret Manor Cemetery in Sunbury, Pennsylvania.

== Medal of Honor citation ==
The President of the United States of America, in the name of Congress, takes pleasure in presenting the Medal of Honor to Captain Thomas W. Hoffman, United States Army, for extraordinary heroism on April 2, 1865, while serving with Company A, 208th Pennsylvania Infantry, in action at Petersburg, Virginia. Captain Hoffman prevented a retreat of his regiment during the battle.

== See also ==
- List of Medal of Honor recipients
- Pennsylvania in the American Civil War
