= Charles B. Dougherty =

Pennsylvania Army National Guard officer

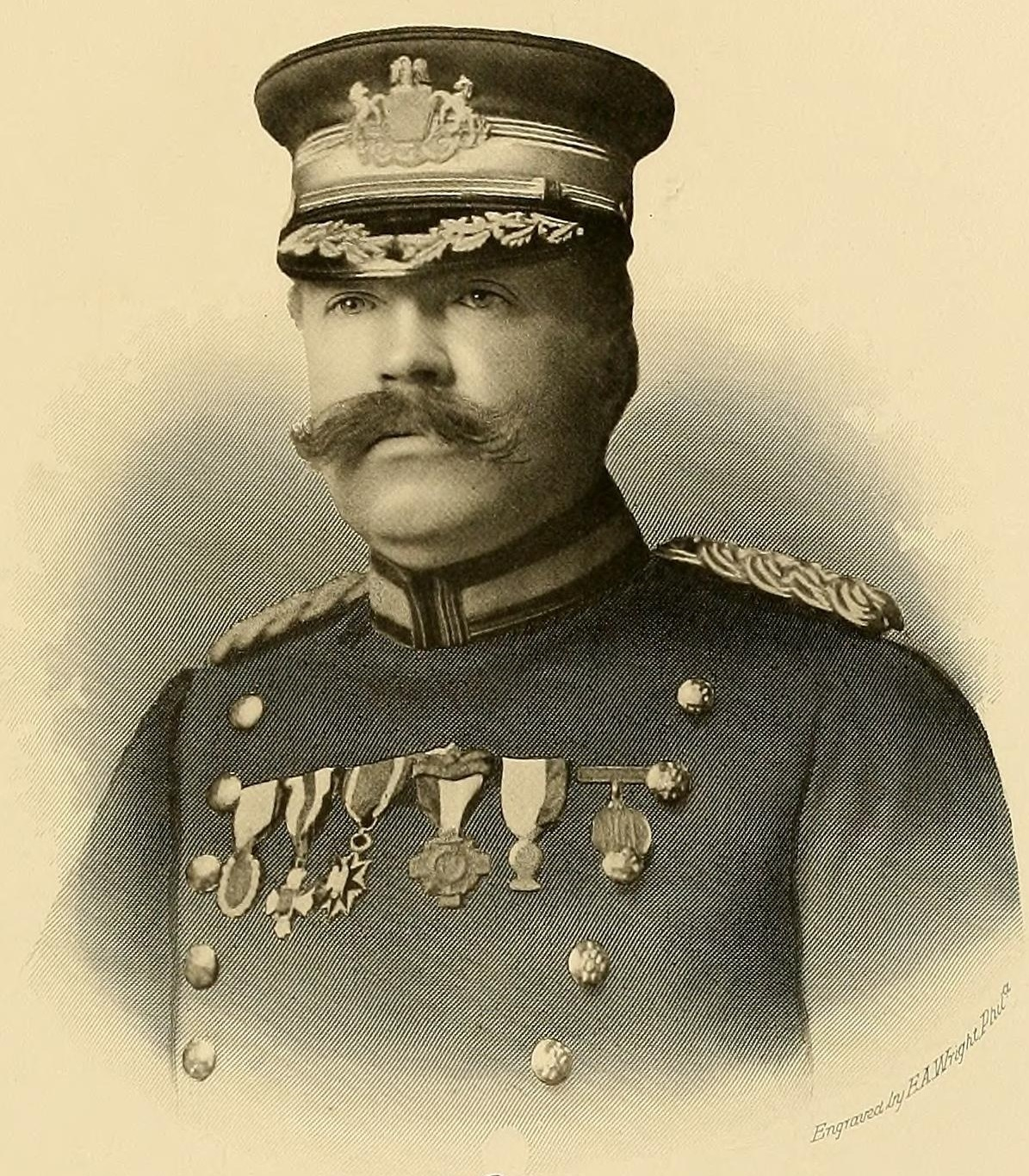
- Dougherty as depicted in Volume 1 of 1906's Genealogical and Family History of the Wyoming and Lackawanna Valleys
- Born: September 3, 1860; Wilkes-Barre, Pennsylvania, U.S.
- Died: August 1, 1924 (aged 63) Wilkes-Barre, Pennsylvania, U.S.
- Buried: Oak Lawn Cemetery and Mausoleum, Wilkes-Barre, Pennsylvania
- Allegiance: United States of America
- Branch: Pennsylvania National Guard
- Service years: 1881–1915
- Rank: Major General
- Commands: 9th Regiment; 3rd Brigade; 28th Infantry Division
- Conflicts: Spanish–American War
- Other work: Manager and executive, Susquehanna Coal Company
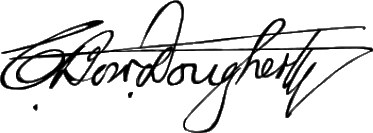
- Signature

Charles Bowman Dougherty (September 3, 1860 – August 1, 1924) was an officer in the Pennsylvania Army National Guard. He attained the rank of major general as commander of the 28th Infantry Division.

== Early life ==
Charles B. Dougherty was born in Wilkes-Barre, Pennsylvania, on September 3, 1860. He was educated in Wilkes-Barre and attended Emerson Institute in Washington, D.C. As an adult, his name was often abbreviated "C. Bow. Dougherty", and he was called "Bow".

== Business career ==
Dougherty spent his entire career with the Susquehanna Coal Company and its successor companies, advancing through the corporate ranks to become chief clerk, purchasing agent, and then assistant manager.

== Military career ==
In 1881 he enlisted in the Pennsylvania National Guard's 9th Regiment (now the 109th Field Artillery). He advanced through the enlisted ranks to sergeant major before receiving his commission as a first lieutenant in 1887. He advanced through the officer ranks to become regimental commander in 1897 with the rank of colonel.

Dougherty commanded the 9th Regiment when it was federalized for the Spanish–American War in 1898, and continued in command after returning to Pennsylvania. During the war he also served twice as commander of 3rd Brigade, 3rd Division, III Corps.

In 1901 he was appointed commander of the Pennsylvania National Guard's 3rd Brigade as a brigadier general.

After succeeding Wendell P. Bowman, from 1910 to 1915 Dougherty held the rank of major general as commander of the Pennsylvania National Guard Division, now known as the 28th Infantry Division. At the time he was the youngest officer to command the division, and the first commander who had not been a veteran of the American Civil War. He retired in 1915, and was succeeded as division commander by Charles M. Clement.

== Later life ==
Dougherty was active in the Naval and Military Order of the Spanish–American War, and later the Military Order of Foreign Wars.

He applied for return to active duty in World War I, but was unable to persuade the Secretary of War and Army Chief of Staff to act favorably. During the 1918 influenza epidemic he led efforts to address the problem in the Wilkes-Barre area. In addition, Dougherty served as a member of the state armory board, which provided oversight of construction, maintenance and use of armories and other National Guard training facilities.

== Death and burial ==
Dougherty was in ill health for the last six years of his life. He died in Wilkes-Barre on August 1, 1924, after having become ill while attending a military banquet in New York City and being transported to his home. He was buried at Oak Lawn Cemetery and Mausoleum in Wilkes-Barre.

== Family ==
In 1883 Dougherty married Anna D. Posten of Wilkes-Barre. They were the parents of four daughters, two of whom lived to adulthood—Helen and Marion.

== Published works ==
Historical Souvenir of the Ninth Regiment, Infantry, N. G. P. Wilkes-Barre, PA: Wilkes-Barre Armory Association. 1896.

Military offices
Preceded by Wendell P. Bowman	Commanding General of the 28th Infantry Division; 1910–1915	Succeeded by Charles M. Clement
