= Muir Army Heliport =

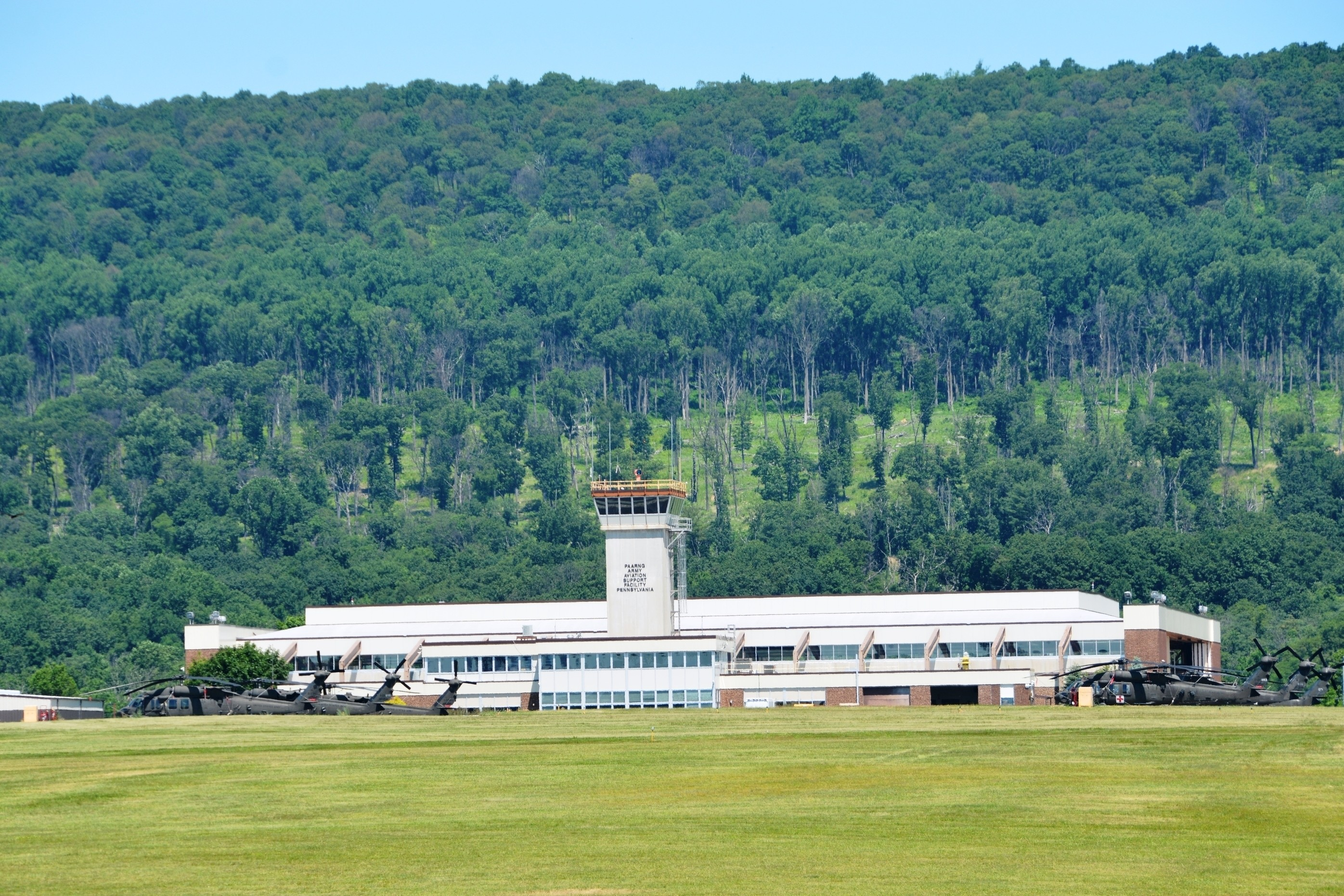
- Muir Army Heliport at Fort Indiantown Gap, PA
- IATA: MUI; ICAO: KMUI; FAA LID: MUI

Summary
- Airport type: Military
- Owner: United States Army
- Operator: Pennsylvania Army National Guard
- Location: Fort Indiantown Gap, Pennsylvania
- Elevation AMSL: 488 ft / 149 m
- Coordinates: 40°26′05″N 076°34′09″W
- Website: Official website

Runways
Direction	Length		Surface
Direction	ft	m	Surface
7/25	3,967	1,209	asphalt

Muir Army Heliport (previously Muir Army Airfield) (IATA: MUI, ICAO: KMUI, FAA LID: MUI) is a military airport at Fort Indiantown Gap, near Annville, Pennsylvania, United States. It is home to the 28th Combat Aviation Brigade and Eastern Army National Guard Aviation Training Site (EAATS), operated by the Pennsylvania Army National Guard. It is 24 nautical miles (44 kilometres) northeast of the central business district of Harrisburg, in South Central Pennsylvania. The airfield has one active runway designated 7/25 with a 3,978 ft × 98 ft (1,212 m × 30 m) asphalt surface.

== History ==
Muir Army Airfield was established as an airstrip in the 1930s and was originally the central parade ground and emergency landing field of the Fort Indiantown Gap military reservation. On July 12, 1941, the first airplane piloted by Major Edgar Scattergood, Air Office of the 28th Infantry Division, landed on the newly dedicated Muir Field. The 3,200 x 100 foot runway was of good size for fixed-wing aircraft at the time; however, the Army Corps of Engineers built the runway in a northeast-southwest direction. The prevailing wind blows out of the mountains from the northwest, so there is usually a permanent crosswind during normal weather conditions.

The airfield was named in honor of Major General Charles H. Muir, the Commanding General of the 28th Division during World War I.

In 2023, the airfield was redesignated as Muir Army Heliport.

== Units ==
- Combat Aviation Brigade, 28th Infantry Division
  - Headquarters and Headquarters Company (HHC)
  - 2d Battalion (General Support), 104th Aviation Regiment (2-104th GSAB)
  - 628th Aviation Support Battalion (628th ASB)

== Eastern Army National Guard Training Site ==
EAATS was established in by the United States Army in 1981 and focuses on utility and cargo missions, specifically conducting Sikorsky UH-60 Black Hawk and Boeing CH-47 Chinook qualifications for pilots, instructor pilots, and maintenance test pilots, as well as enlisted maintainers and crewmembers. The 28th Expeditionary Combat Aviation Brigade, headquartered at Muir Army Airfield, provides all the maintenance support for EAATS.

== Statistics ==
Muir Army Airfield currently accommodates 42 helicopters, conducting about 70,000 take-offs and landings annually, making it the second busiest helicopter base in the U.S. Army.

== See also ==
- List of United States Army airfields
- United States Army Aviation Center of Excellence
