= John B. Packer =

American politician (1824–1891)

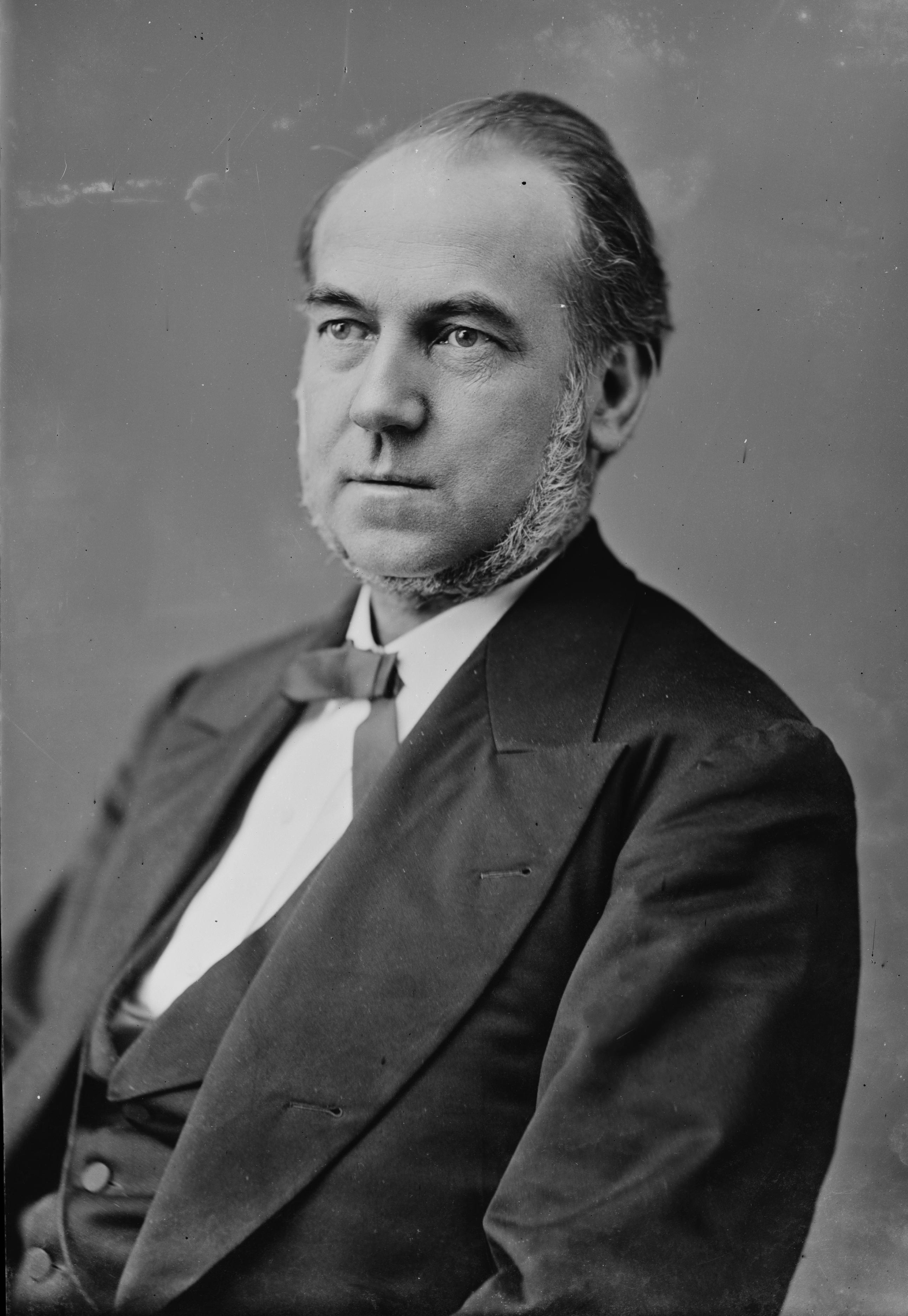
Packer, 1870–1880

John Black Packer (March 21, 1824 – July 7, 1891) was a Republican member of the U.S. House of Representatives from Pennsylvania.

== Biography ==
John B. Packer was born in Sunbury, Pennsylvania on March 21, 1824. Initially a private student, he later attended the Sunbury Academy in Sunbury, Pennsylvania.

From 1839 to 1842, he served with the corps of engineers that was employed by the Commonwealth of Pennsylvania in the survey and construction of public improvements.

After completed law studies, Packer was admitted to the bar on August 6, 1844, and began his legal practice in Sunbury, where he was also engaged in banking.

Deputy attorney general of the Commonwealth of Pennsylvania from 1845 to 1847, he subsequently served in the Pennsylvania State House of Representatives in 1850 and 1851. He also became one of the organizers of the Susquehanna Railroad Company in 1851.

Packer was then elected as a Republican to the forty-first and to the three succeeding Congresses. He served as chairman of the United States House Committee on Railways and Canals during the Forty-second Congress and United States House Committee on Post Office and Post Roads during the Forty-third Congress.

After declining to be a candidate for renomination in 1876, he resumed the practice of law in Sunbury, as well as his banking activities.

He died in Sunbury on July 7, 1891 and was interred at the Pomfret Manor Cemetery in Sunbury.

U.S. House of Representatives
Preceded by George F. Miller	Member of the U.S. House of Representatives from Pennsylvania's 14th congressional district 1869–1877	Succeeded by John W. Killinger
