= Pennsylvania–Lithuania National Guard Partnership =

Military partnership

Pennsylvania–Lithuania State Partnership
- Part of the U.S. European Command State Partnership Program
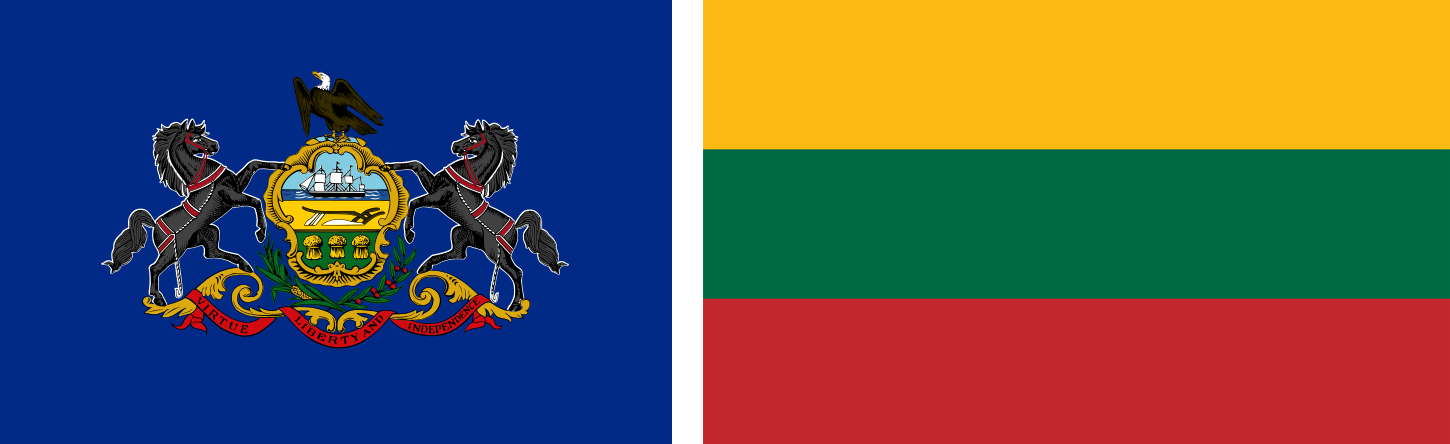
- Origin: 1993
- Country president: Gitanas Nausėda
- Prime minister: Ingrida Šimonytė
- Minister of defense: Laurynas Kasčiūnas
- Ambassador to U.S.: Zygimantas Pavilionis
- Ambassador to Lithuania: Deborah Ann McCarthy
- Adjutant general: Wesley E. Craig
- 2012 Engagements: 12
- NATO member: Yes (2004)
- EU member: Yes (2004)

Lithuania

The Pennsylvania–Lithuania National Guard Partnership is one of 25 European partnerships that make up the U.S. European Command State Partnership Program and one of 88 worldwide partnerships that make-up the National Guard State Partnership Program. The Partnership was established on April 27, 1993. In the 30 years that have followed, Pennsylvania and Lithuania have conducted more than 500 exchanges that cover diverse topics such as Senior Leader Engagements, Recruiting, NCO Professional Development, Military Decision Making Process and Strategic Planning, Range Development, Airfield Development and Standards, Defense Support to Civil Authorities, Family Programs, and Resiliency. Also, Pennsylvania and Lithuania have jointly deployed to Afghanistan in support of ISAF, including four rotations of a Police Operational Mentor and Liaison Team. Pennsylvania also provided nine rotations of a team of Logistics Advisors to the Lithuanian led Provincial Reconstruction Team in the Gowhr Province. Pennsylvania and Lithuania are looking at other opportunities to jointly deploy to further expand the relationship between their militaries.

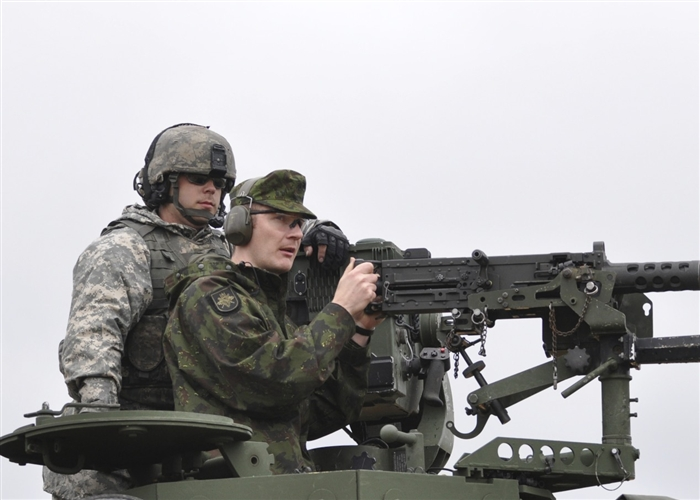
Pennsylvania National Guard Soldiers participate in a joint live fire exercise with Lithuanian Soldiers as part of U.S. Army in Europe's multinational security exercise Saber Strike.

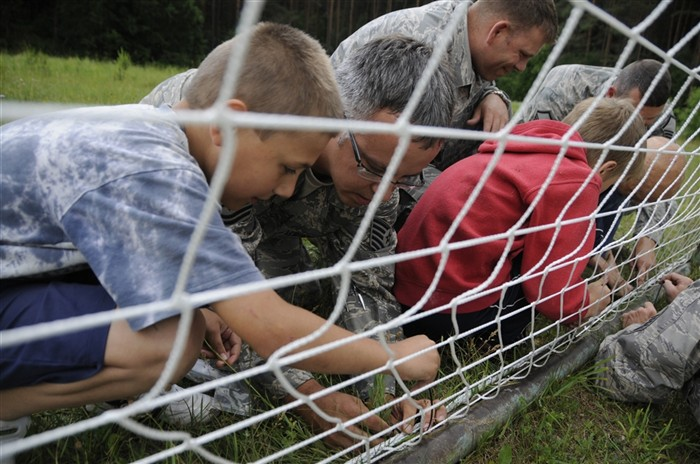
Soldiers from Pennsylvania visit an orphanage in Lithuania to help repair sports and playground equipment, assist with landscaping chores and play with the children at the facility.

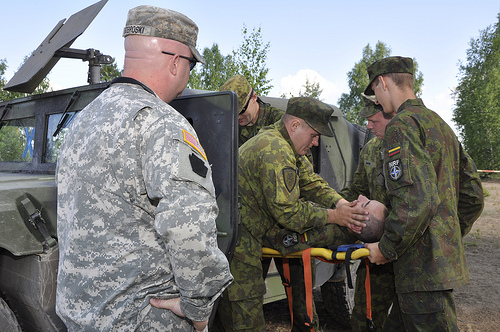
A Pennsylvania Guardsman instructs Lithuanian troops on vehicle extraction techniques.

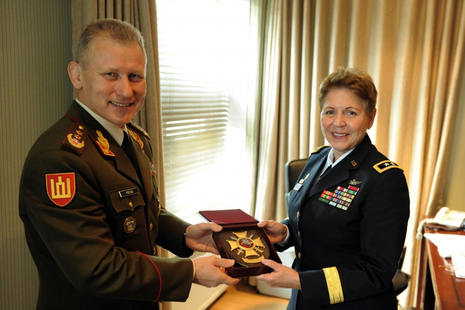
MG Jessica L. Wright, the Adjutant General of the Pennsylvania National Guard, meets with Maj. Gen. Arvydas Pocius, the Chief of Defence of Lithuania.

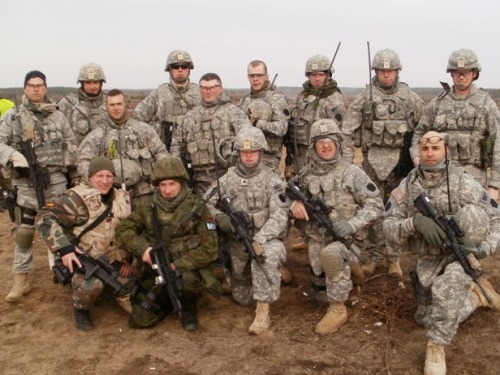
Members of the Pennsylvania National Guard are serving in Afghanistan alongside Lithuanians, and helping to train Afghan policemen.

== History ==
- Declared Independence in 1991.
- Established State Partnership Program on April 27, 1993.
- EU and NATO accession in 2004
- Lithuania cooperates with Estonia and Latvia in several joint military exercises. (Saber Strike, Amber Hope)
- Lithuania's niche capability for NATO is water purification. They have a significant interest in the development of an Energy Security Center of Excellence.
- Lithuania hosts the Baltic Air Policing Mission at Šiauliai International Airport.

== Partnership focus ==
Lithuanian's #1 defense priority is energy security. Additional focus areas include Cyber Defense, continuing to participate in expeditionary operations and ISAF, as well as developing new and capable interagency partnerships. Lithuania also hosts the Baltic Air Policing Mission at the Šiauliai International Airport.

Pennsylvania and Lithuanian consistently participate in joint exercises together, such as Saber Strike and Amber Hope, which promote regional stability and security, strengthens international military partnering and fosters trust while improving interoperability between participating nations.

The State Partnership Program highlights the role of the National Guard as an all-volunteer, professional military with dual missions to support the nation and the state. The unique civil-military nature of the Pennsylvania National Guard enables it to interact with Lithuanian active and reserve forces, as well as civilian and governmental agencies. As a result, the Pennsylvania Emergency Management Agency and the Lithuanian Fire and Rescue Service have developed a five-year strategic plan to find ways to cooperate, along with the Pennsylvania National Guard in areas like Disaster Preparedness and Defense Support of Civil Authorities.
