= Combat Aviation Brigade, 28th Infantry Division =

- Shoulder sleeve insignia of the 28th Infantry Division
- Country: United States
- Branch: United States Army
- Type: Combat Aviation Brigade
- Role: Aviation
- Size: Brigade
- Part of: 28th Infantry Division
- Garrison/HQ: Muir Army Airfield, PA
- Nickname: TF Anvil
- Campaigns: War on terrorism

Commanders
- Current commander: Col. Michael Girvin

Insignia
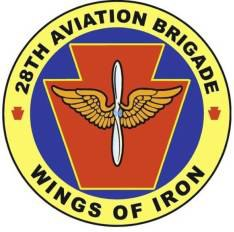
- badge

The Combat Aviation Brigade, 28th Infantry Division is an aviation unit of the Pennsylvania Army National Guard. It is one of four brigades of the 28th Infantry Division. It provides helicopters for both federal and state active duty missions. The aviators of the CAB fly the Sikorsky UH-60 Black Hawk, Eurocopter UH-72A Lakota and Boeing CH-47 Chinook helicopters.

The brigade commander is Lt. Col. Michael Girvin, and the Command Sergeant Major is Command Sgt. Maj. Jeffery Huttle.

Currently, the brigade is made up of the:

- Headquarters and Headquarters Company (HHC)
- 2d Battalion (General Support), 104th Aviation Regiment (2-104th GSAB)
- 628th Aviation Support Battalion (628th ASB)

== History ==
The Aviation Brigade traces its heritage to 1 June 1959 with the activation of the 28th Aviation Company at the Capital City Airport, New Cumberland, Pennsylvania. The unit was reorganized as the 28th Aviation Battalion on 1 April 1963 and later relocated to 18th and Herr Streets (1976) and 21st and Herr Streets (1980) in Harrisburg, Pennsylvania.

On 1 October 1986, the Aviation Brigade was organized under the Army of Excellence (AOE) design. Station relocation to the World War II barracks in area 2, Fort Indiantown Gap, occurred on 1 May 1992 for HHC, Aviation Brigade, and Detachment 1, HHT, Troops C and D (Air), 1st Squadron, 104th Cavalry, ending 33 years of service in the Harrisburg area.

As of mid-1999, the brigade operated 86 Bell UH-1 Iroquois "Huey" and Bell AH-1 Cobra helicopters, as well as a supporting element of 27 M1 Abrams tanks and other ground combat equipment. Although training in the brigade is focused on possible employment in time of war, its soldiers are frequently called on to rescue endangered citizens and perform other emergency missions across the state.

=== 2009 Iraq deployment ===
Soldiers of the CAB, 28th Infantry Division began mobilization on 29 January 2009 for Operation Iraqi Freedom 09-11. Over 2,000 soldiers from multiple states completed validation training at Fort Sill, Oklahoma before moving to Camp Buehring, Kuwait. Throughout the opening days of May 2009, soldiers flew into multiple forward operating bases across Iraq with the majority of the brigade based out of Tallil, Al Kut, and Basrah.

- Headquarters, Combat Aviation Brigade
  - 2d Battalion (General Support), 104th Aviation Regiment
    - Company A (Assault), 1st Battalion, 106th Aviation Regiment
    - Company B (Heavy Lift), 2d Battalion, 104th Aviation Regiment
    - Company C (Attack), 3d Battalion, 159th Aviation Regiment***
    - Company C (Medical Evacuation), 1st Battalion, 52nd Aviation Regiment
    - Company D (Maintenance), 2d Battalion, 104th Aviation Regiment
    - Company E (Supply), 2d Battalion, 104th Aviation Regiment
    - Company F (Air Traffic Control), 2d Battalion, 104th Aviation Regiment
  - 1st Battalion, 189th Aviation Regiment (Montana Army National Guard)
  - 1st Battalion (Assault Helicopter), 150th Aviation Regiment
  - 1st Battalion, 224th Aviation Regiment
  - 628th Aviation Support Battalion (628th ASB)

(*** Company C, 3d Battalion, 159th Aviation Regiment is a Regular Army unit that was OPCON to the 2d Battalion (General Support), 104th Aviation Regiment during OIF 08-10. It is currently task organized as a part of the 12th Combat Aviation Brigade stationed in Germany.)

=== 2020 Middle East deployment ===
The brigade deployed to the Middle East in the summer of 2020 replacing the Combat Aviation Brigade, 34th Infantry Division. The 28th ECAB, operating under the name Task Force Anvil, is made up of almost 2000 Soldiers from the active component and nine different states' national guards- Indiana, New Jersey, Ohio, West Virginia, Wisconsin, Michigan, Nebraska and Oklahoma with the majority of Soldiers coming from Pennsylvania. They are conducting combat operations and providing military support to civilian authorities in support or Operation Spartan Shield, maintaining a U.S. military posture in southwest Asia, and Operation Inherent Resolve, the fight against Daesh. Everyone from the 28th ECAB returned home safely by June 2021.

The 28th ECAB's primary elements included:

- Headquarters and Headquarters Company
- 628th Aviation Support Battalion
- 2d Battalion (General Support), 104th Aviation Regiment
- 1st Battalion (Assault), 137th Aviation Regiment
- 4th Battalion (Attack Reconnaissance), 4th Combat Aviation Brigade
