= Spanish War Service Medal =

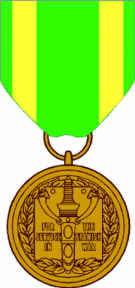
- Obverse
- Type: Service medal
- Awarded for: Military personnel who performed active duty during the Spanish–American War, but did not qualify for the Spanish Campaign Medal.
- Presented by: Department of War
- Status: Obsolete
- Established: July 9, 1918
- Service ribbon of the medal

The Spanish War Service Medal was a United States military medal of the U.S. Army which was established by an act of the U.S. Congress on 9 July 1918 (40 Stat. 873). The medal recognizes those members of the Army and of the U.S. Volunteers who performed active duty during the Spanish–American War, but did not qualify for the Spanish Campaign Medal.

== Background ==
The primary purpose for the creation of the Spanish War Service Medal was to recognize units of the Army which had performed homeland defense in the United States during the years of the Spanish–American War. The award was also presented extensively to members of the United States National Guard who had been federalized for active military duty but had not been deployed to actual combat in the Spanish–American War.

The first recipient was Major General Charles M. Clement who was the longest-tenured National Guard officer eligible for the award at the time it was authorized. The medal was similar in design to the Mexican Border Service Medal, which had been established the same year as the Spanish War Service Medal.

== Criteria ==
To be awarded the Spanish War Service Medal, a service member must have served on active duty in the United States Army between 20 April 1898 and 11 April 1899. Those who were awarded the Spanish Campaign Medal were ineligible to receive the Spanish War Service Medal.

The Spanish War Service Medal was a one time decoration and there were no devices authorized to the medal. The award was also strictly for Army personnel, since United States Navy and Marine Corps personnel, who had served in the Spanish–American War, qualified for the Spanish Campaign Medal regardless if overseas duty was performed.

== Appearance ==
The medal is made of bronze and is 1 3/8 inches (35 mm) wide. The obverse of the medal is a Roman sword hanging on a tablet bearing the inscription FOR SERVICE IN THE SPANISH WAR. The tablet is surrounded by a wreath, while the sword is sheathed representing the service of the National Guard within the Continental United States, not in combat. The reverse bears the coat of arms of the United States over a scroll inscribed FOR SERVICE surrounded by a wreath with the insignia of the Infantry at left, Artillery at the bottom and Cavalry at right. The ribbon is emerald green 1 3/8 inches (35 mm) wide. At the edges are golden yellow stripes 1/4 inch (6.4 mm) wide.
