= Pennsylvania Army National Guard =

Military of the U.S. state of Pennsylvania

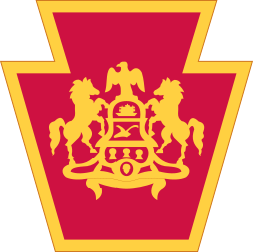
- Distinctive shoulder sleeve insignia
- Active: 1747-present
- Country: United States
- Allegiance: Pennsylvania
- Branch: United States Army
- Type: Reserve land force
- Role: United States Army National Guard
- Size: 15,514
- Part of: Pennsylvania National Guard
- Garrison/HQ: Harrisburg, Pennsylvania

Commanders
- Civilian leadership: President Donald Trump (Commander-in-Chief); Daniel Driscoll (Secretary of the Army); Governor Josh Shapiro (Governor of the Commonwealth of Pennsylvania)
- Commonwealth military leadership: Major General John Pippy (Adjutant General)

Insignia
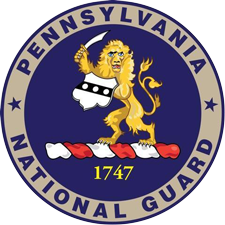
- Seal of the Pennsylvania National Guard

- Pennsylvania Army National Guard Crest

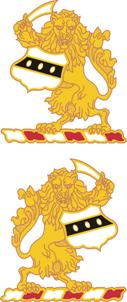
- Pennsylvania Army National Guard STARC DUI

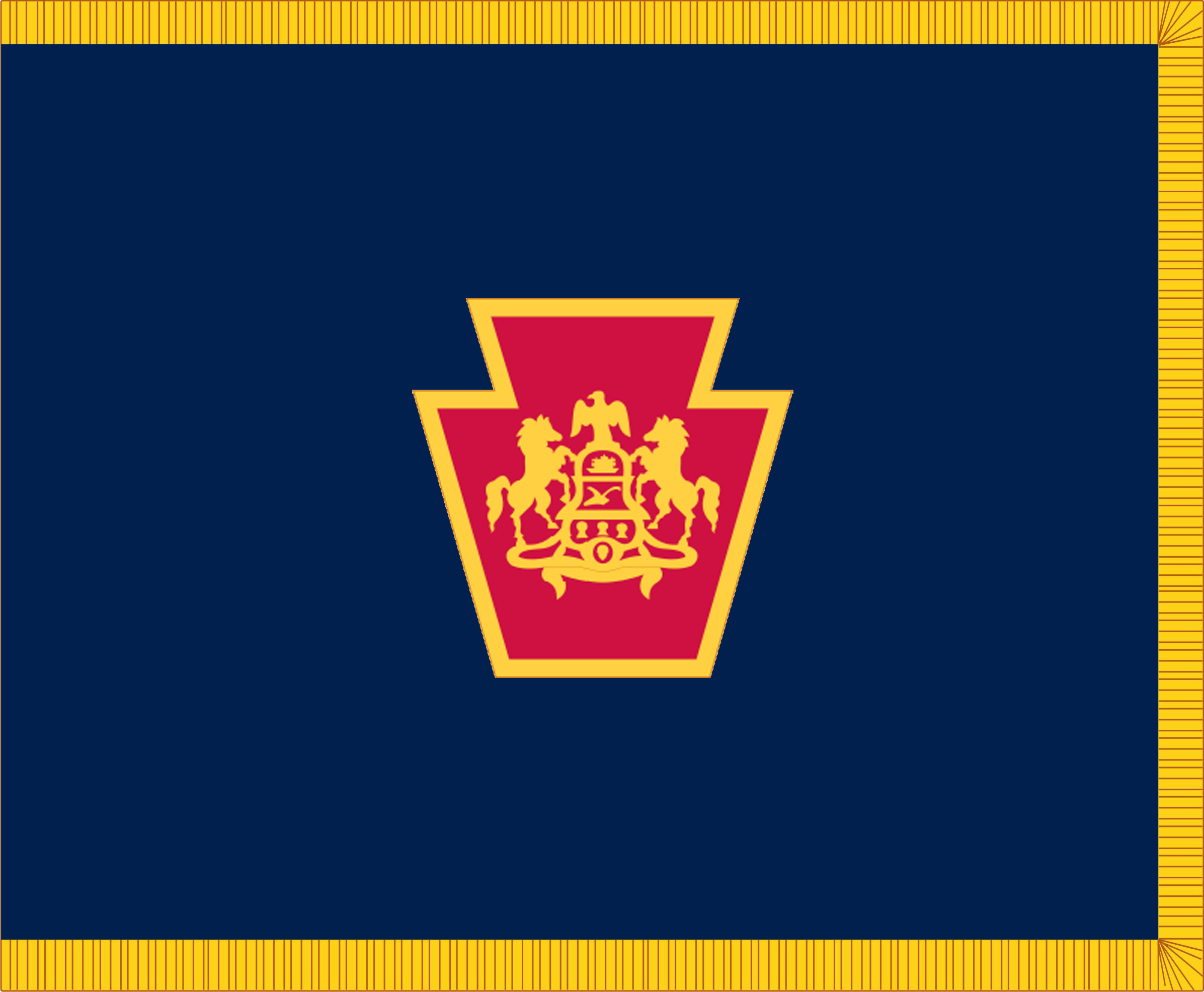
- Pennsylvania Army National Guard Headquarters Flag

The Pennsylvania Army National Guard, abbreviated PAARNG, is part of the United States Army National Guard and is based in the U.S. Commonwealth of Pennsylvania. Together with the Pennsylvania Air National Guard, it is directed by the Pennsylvania Department of Military and Veterans Affairs. The PAARNG maintains 124 armories and is present in 87 communities across the Commonwealth.

== Creation ==
The Pennsylvania National Guard traces its lineage back to the militia organized by Benjamin Franklin in 1747 known as the Associators. Franklin organized artillery and infantry units to defend the city of Philadelphia against French and Spanish privateers. The first meeting of the Associators occurred on 21 November 1747, and on 7 Dec. 1747, the enlistees and officers were formally commissioned by the Provincial Council President, Anthony Palmer. On that day, hundreds of armed Associators presented themselves to Palmer at the Philadelphia Courthouse. Official National Guard webpages state that 'he wisely stated their activities were "not disapproved" and duly commissioned all of them.'

Only in 1755 did this volunteer militia gain official status. On November 25, 1755, the Pennsylvania Assembly passed the Militia Act of 1755. This measure 'legalized a military force from those who were willing and desirous of being united for military purposes within the province.' This was as a result of citizens' pleas for protection from the French and Indians on the western borders. Two years later, a compulsory militia law was also enacted. All males between 17 and 45 years of age, having a freehold worth 150 pounds a year, were to be organized into companies. Every enrolled militiaman was required to appear for training, arming himself, on the first Mondays of March, June, August, and November.

In 1793, the governor of Pennsylvania, Thomas Mifflin established the Adjutant General's Office to provide for "a new system for the regulation of the militia." The next year, Pennsylvania contributed 4,000 militiamen to a four-state force which quelled the Whiskey Rebellion in the western part of the state. Amongst the force were men of the First Troop Philadelphia City Cavalry, the oldest continuously serving U.S. Army unit.

The War of 1812 drew 14,000 Pennsylvanians into active service. During the war, the ancestors of three present day PA ARNG units gained campaign credit. Today those ARNG units are the 103rd Engineer Battalion, the 111th Infantry Regiment, and the Headquarters & Headquarters Troop, 2nd Squadron, 104th Cavalry Regiment. Before the Battle of Lake Erie, an artillery company provided volunteers to serve as cannoneers aboard Commodore Perry's ships. That unit is known today as Wilkes-Barre's 109th Field Artillery Regiment.

The Washington Grays of Philadelphia (also known as Volunteer Corps of Light Infantry, Light Artillery Corps, Washington Grays, Artillery Corps, Washington Grays) was a Volunteer regiment which functioned during peace and war. The Regiment was formed in 1822 and was eventually integrated into the Pennsylvania National Guard in 1879.

At the start of the American Civil War in April 1861, five units from the Lehigh Valley raced to Washington, D.C., which was under threat, in response to an urgent plea from Congress. President Abraham Lincoln proclaimed them the "First Defenders"—an honor still borne by their descendants in varied PA National Guard units.

Over 360,000 Pennsylvanians served in the Union Army, more than any other Northern state except New York. Beginning with President Lincoln's first call for troops and continuing throughout the war, Pennsylvania mustered 215 infantry regiments, as well as dozens of emergency militia regiments that were raised to repel threatened invasions in 1862 and 1863 by the Confederate States Army. Twenty-two cavalry regiments were also mustered, as well as dozens of light artillery batteries.

== Pennsylvania National Guard ==
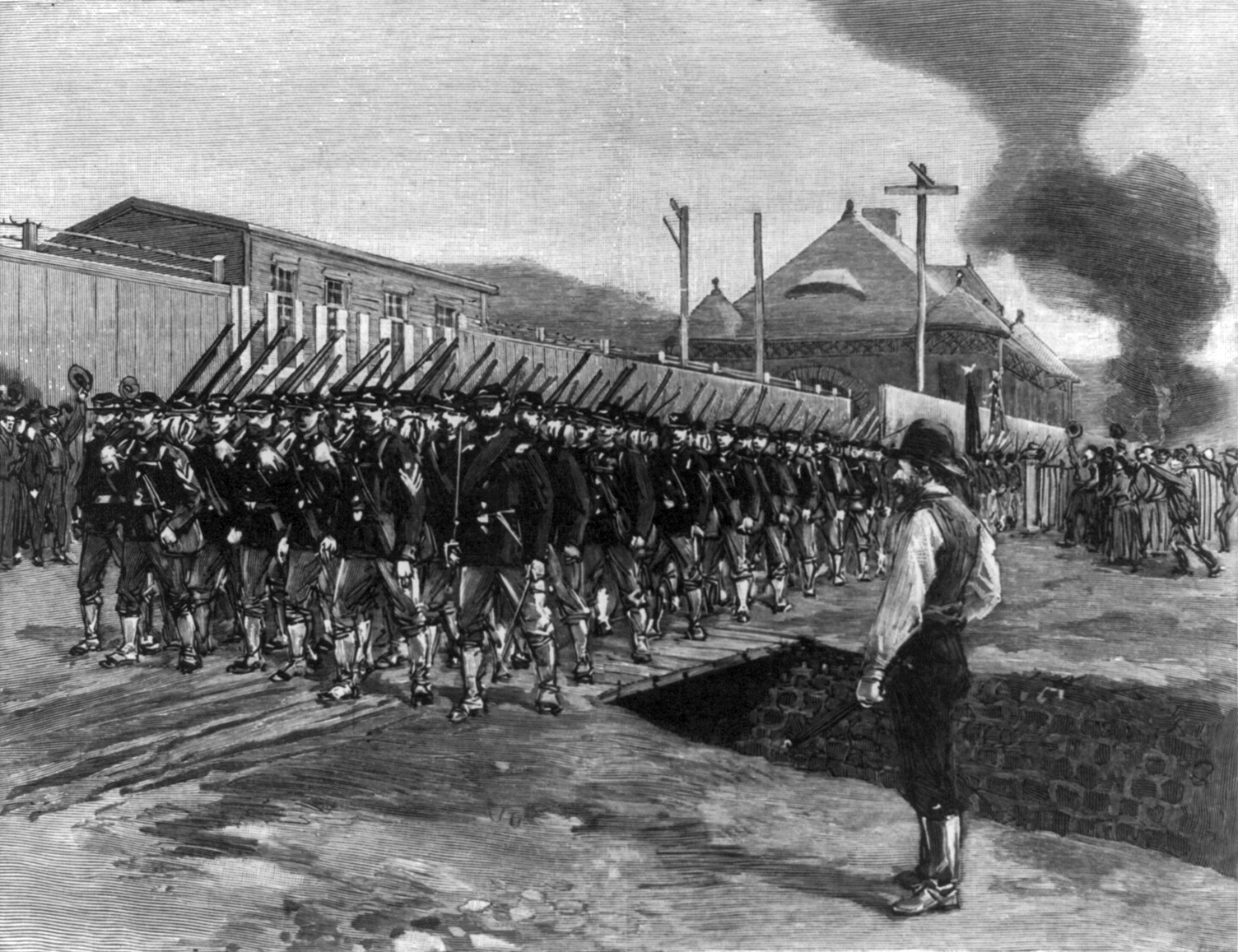
Troops of the 80th Regiment arriving in Homestead during the Homestead Strike of 1892

In 1870, the name "militia" was dropped, and the force became by state law the "National Guard of Pennsylvania."

In 1879, the Pennsylvania National Guard established a division, organized in a fashion not specifically approved by the War Department. The keystone was prescribed as the designated symbol of the National Guard of Pennsylvania on 27 August 1879.

The Pennsylvania National Guard was mobilized for the Spanish–American War and the Pancho Villa Expedition. When the United States Army created the Spanish War Service and Mexican Border Service Medals, Major General Charles M. Clement was designated as the first official recipient of each, in recognition of his status as the longest-tenured National Guard officer eligible for the medals at the time they were authorized. Clement served in the Pennsylvania National Guard from 1877 to 1917, and commanded the 28th Infantry Division at the start of World War I.

During the mobilization after the U.S. entry into World War I in 1917, a number of previously separately numbered Pennsylvania infantry regiments were given U.S. Army designations. Thus the 109th Infantry Regiment, the 110th Infantry Regiment, the 111th Infantry Regiment, and the 112th Infantry Regiment were established. These regiments formed the two brigades (55th and 56th) of the newly designated 28th Division, which then saw war service in Europe. Alongside the four regiments of infantry were created four machine-gun battalions.

The 104th Cavalry Regiment (United States) was formed on 1 June 1921 by reorganization of the 8th Infantry, PA ARNG. It became a part of the 21st Cavalry Division. On 1 May 1922, elements of the machine gun battalions which had served in World War I were reorganized as the 213th Coast Artillery.

On 17 February 1942, as part of the triangularization of Army divisions, the previous 103rd Engineer Regiment was broken up and the 103rd Engineer Battalion established. The other battalion of the regiment became the 180th Engineer Battalion.

After being activated in February 1941, the 28th Infantry Division was reorganized in February 1942, and the 111th Infantry Regiment detached for other duties. The division trained in the Carolinas, Virginia, Louisiana, Texas, and Florida. It went overseas on 8 October 1943, arriving in South Wales. On 22 July 1944, the division landed in Normandy. It took part in the Normandy, Northern France, Rhineland, Ardennes-Alsace, and Central European campaigns. It saw 196 days of combat.

In February 1942, the 111th Regiment was re-formed as a regimental combat team in the Army Ground Forces Reserve to guard militarily important facilities in the Chesapeake Bay area. From this assignment, it was transferred to the Pacific Theater in late 1943.

After being inactivated as part of the Army on 13 December 1945 at Camp Shelby, Mississippi, the 28th Infantry Division was reorganized on 20 November 1946 and returned to the Pennsylvania Army National Guard, with its headquarters established at Harrisburg.

Among the units formed after the end of World War II reorganization of the National Guard was the 628th Tank Battalion.

Following the outbreak of the Korean War, several Pennsylvania units saw active service there. Meanwhile, the 28th Division was ordered into active federal service 5 September 1950 at Harrisburg. The Division re-opened the mothballed Camp Atterbury, Indiana and remained there from 13 September 1950 to 23 November 1951. It was sent to Germany to augment NATO forces in Germany. During the Korean War, the 28th was mobilized and deployed to Europe as a part of the NATO command defending Western Europe from the threat of Soviet attack and remained on federal service until 22 May 1954.

In June 1959 the Pennsylvania Army National Guard was extensively reorganized in line with the Pentomic (ROCID) organization then coming into force. At that time, a number of separate Tank and Field Artillery Battalions which had served through World Wars I and II were reorganized as regiments. Thus the 103rd Armor Regiment (constituted 1 June 1959, partially from the 628th Tank Bn), 107th Field Artillery Regiment, the 108th Field Artillery Regiment, the 109th Field Artillery Regiment, the 166th Field Artillery Regiment, the 229th Field Artillery Regiment (United States), and the 28th Aviation Company were established or re-established.

From 1959 to 1974, the 176th Air Defense Artillery Regiment was part of the force. 1-176 and 2-176 were part of the 218 AG(AD) from 1 June 1959 to 1 Apr 1963, after which the 2-176 joined the 213th Artillery Group (Air Defense) until 17 February 1968, and thereafter until 1974 just with the PA ARNG.

In 1972, widespread flooding in the aftermath of Hurricane Agnes resulted in 45 deaths and $3 billion in property damage. Nearly 13,000 Army and Air Guard members were called to state active duty to help with relief operations.

In 1987-1988 Army National Guard aviation units were converted into regiments, and thus the 104th Aviation Regiment was formed in Pennsylvania. The regiment traced its history to the activation of an aviation company for the 28th Infantry Division in 1959. In August 1989, the 165th Military Police Battalion was reorganized as the 1st Battalion, 213th Air Defense Artillery Regiment. Two years earlier, the 165th MP Bn had been headquartered in Lehighton.

After the Iraqi invasion of Kuwait in August 1990, eight Army and Air Guard units from Pennsylvania (seemingly including the 228th Transportation Det, the 121st and 131st Transportation Companies, the 28th Finance Unit, and the 3623rd Maintenance Company) were mobilized for duty during Operations Desert Shield and Desert Storm. Seemingly the four units were scheduled to all return home by May 1991. Every member returned home safely.

Following the end of the Cold War, National Guard State Partnership Programs were established across Europe. In 1993, the Pennsylvania–Lithuania National Guard Partnership was initiated.

In 1996, Pennsylvania Guard members opened roads, transported doctors and patients, and mounted dangerous helicopter rescue operations during statewide flooding and blizzards. The Philadelphia Daily News reported that the 103rd Engineer Battalion had helped clear roads in the city, in conjunction with the Pennsylvania Department of Transportation.

From that year also to 2001, hundreds of Pennsylvania soldiers and airmen deployed to Germany, Hungary (Taszar Air Base, the forward staging base) and Bosnia-Herzegovina as part of peacekeeping efforts (IFOR and SFOR) in the former Yugoslavia. In 1996–97, elements of Headquarters and Headquarters Company (HHC), 213th ASG, HHC 28th Infantry Division, the 28th Personnel Services Battalion, and the 28th Finance Battalion deployed to Europe. The 213th ASG's headquarters processed many active troops through Taszar Air Base on their way into Bosnia-Herzegovina.

== Twenty-first century ==
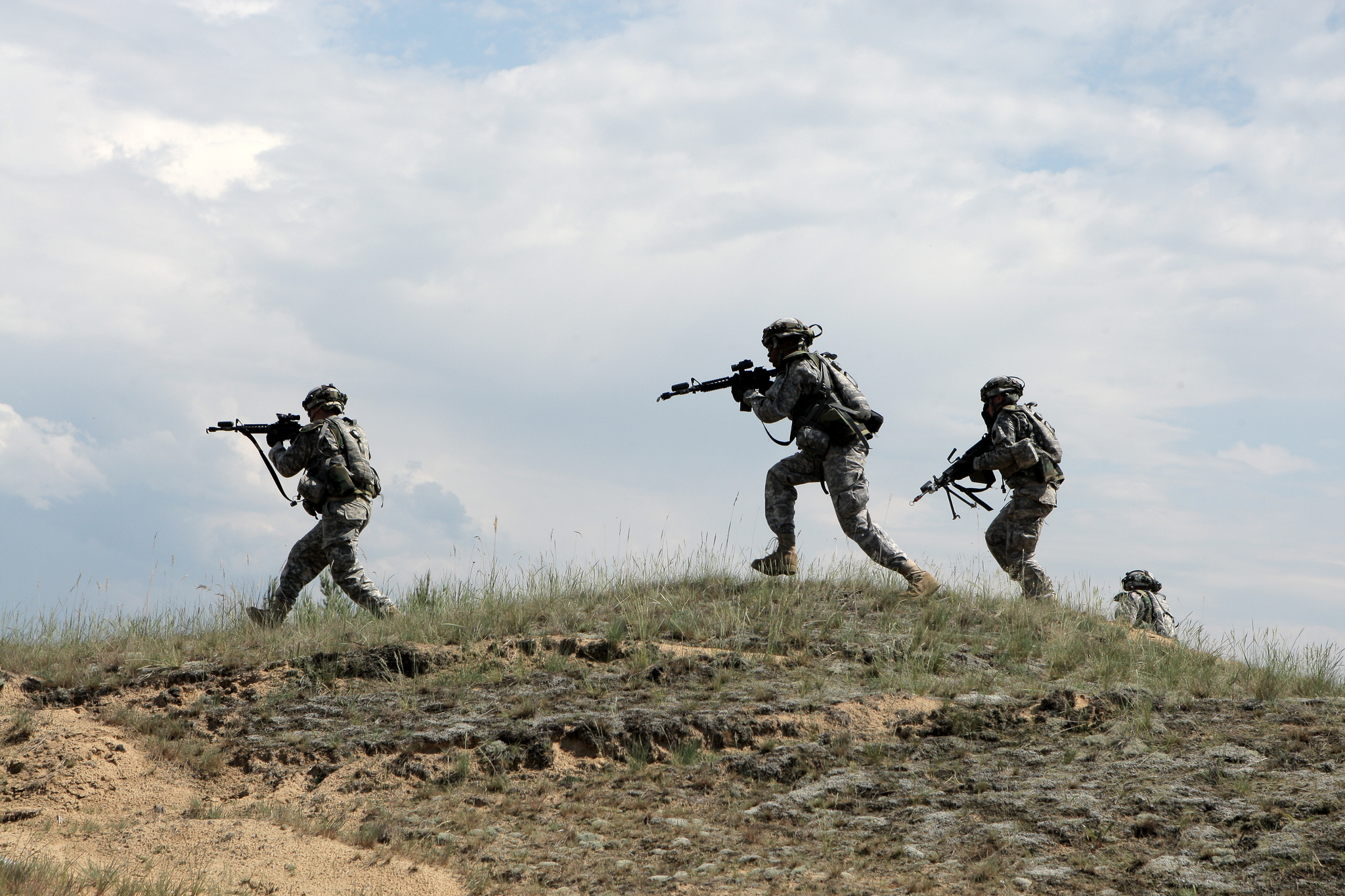
Pennsylvania Army National Guardsmen move forward during an attack at Exercise Saber Strike in Adai, Latvia, June 5, 2013

In 2001, the 56th Brigade was selected as the only reserve component Brigade to be equipped with the Stryker armored personnel carrier, out of seven in the entire United States Army. The brigade was reflagged the 56th Stryker Brigade Combat Team on 24 October 2004 at Fort Indiantown Gap's Muir Army Airfield.

Elements of the 28th Infantry Division deployed twice quickly in succession to Bosnia and Kosovo as part of SFOR and KFOR from 2002. In 2002–03, the Division deployed to Bosnia-Herzegovina (SFOR) and in 2003–04 to Kosovo (KFOR).

From 2005 three brigades deployed to Iraq. The 2nd Infantry Brigade Combat Team deployed to Iraq in 2005–06, the 56th Stryker Brigade Combat Team deployed to Iraq in 2008–09, and the Combat Aviation Brigade, 28th Infantry Division, deployed in 2009.

As of February 20, 2016, under permanent order 051–03, the 55th Armored Brigade Combat Team was redesignated the 55th Maneuver Enhancement Brigade. Under permanent order #051-02 dated February 20, 2016, elements of the 165th Military Police Battalion began to be established, reforming a unit seemingly last active in 1989. As the PA National Guard gained back an MP battalion, it was once again named the 165th based upon the PA ARNG's history. The 1st Battalion, 109th Infantry regiment was transferred to the 2nd Infantry Brigade Combat Team (2nd IBCT). The 3rd Battalion, 103rd Armor Regiment was reassigned to the 278th Armored Brigade Combat Team (278th ABCT), now designated the 278th Armored Cavalry Regiment (278th ACR) Tennessee Army National Guard, with operational control remaining with the Pennsylvania National Guard.

== Organization ==
As of February 2026 the Pennsylvania Army National Guard consists of the following units:

- Joint Force Headquarters-Pennsylvania, Army Element, at Fort Indiantown Gap
  - Headquarters and Headquarters Company, Joint Force Headquarters-Pennsylvania, Army Element, at Fort Indiantown Gap
  - Pennsylvania Recruiting & Retention Battalion, at Fort Indiantown Gap
  - Pennsylvania Medical Detachment, at Fort Indiantown Gap
  - Training Center Fort Indiantown Gap, in Fort Indiantown Gap
  - 3rd Civil Support Team (WMD), at Fort Indiantown Gap
  - Eastern Army National Guard Aviation Training Site, at Muir Army Heliport
  - Army Aviation Support Facility #1, at Muir Army Heliport
  - Army Aviation Support Facility #2, at Johnstown–Cambria County Airport
  - Combined Support Maintenance Shop #1, at Fort Indiantown Gap
  - Combined Support Maintenance Shop #2, in Coraopolis
  - Unit Training Equipment Site #1, at Fort Indiantown Gap
  - Field Maintenance Shop #2, in Taylor
  - Field Maintenance Shop #4, in Phoenixville
  - Field Maintenance Shop #5, in Cambridge Springs
  - Field Maintenance Shop #9, in New Castle
  - Field Maintenance Shop #11, in Connellsville
  - Field Maintenance Shop #14, in Philadelphia
  - Field Maintenance Shop #15, at Fort Indiantown Gap
  - Field Maintenance Shop #17, in Lock Haven
  - Field Maintenance Shop #22, in Pittsburgh
  - Field Maintenance Shop #24, in Carlisle
  - Field Maintenance Shop #27, in Easton
  - Field Maintenance Shop #28, in Williamsport
  - Field Maintenance Shop #29, in State College
  - Field Maintenance Shop #33, in Johnstown
  - Field Maintenance Shop #33, in Graterford
  - 28th Infantry Division, at Harrisburg Military Post
    - Headquarters and Headquarters Battalion, 28th Infantry Division, at Harrisburg Military Post
      - Headquarters Support Company, 28th Infantry Division, at Harrisburg Military Post
      - Company A (Operations), Headquarters and Headquarters Battalion, 28th Infantry Division, at Harrisburg Military Post
      - Company B (Intelligence and Sustainment), Headquarters and Headquarters Battalion, 28th Infantry Division, at Harrisburg Military Post
      - Company C (Signal), Headquarters and Headquarters Battalion, 28th Infantry Division, at Harrisburg Military Post
      - 28th Infantry Division Band, in Torrance
    - 2nd Infantry Brigade Combat Team, in Washington
      - Headquarters and Headquarters Company, 2nd Infantry Brigade Combat Team, in Washington
      - 1st Squadron, 104th Cavalry Regiment, in Philadelphia
        - Headquarters and Headquarters Troop, 1st Squadron, 104th Cavalry Regiment, in Philadelphia
        - Troop A, 1st Squadron, 104th Cavalry Regiment, in Philadelphia
        - Troop B, 1st Squadron, 104th Cavalry Regiment, in Philadelphia
        - Troop C (Dismounted), 1st Squadron, 104th Cavalry Regiment, at Fort Indiantown Gap
      - 1st Battalion, 109th Infantry Regiment, in Scranton
        - Headquarters and Headquarters Company, 1st Battalion, 109th Infantry Regiment, in Scranton
        - Company A, 1st Battalion, 109th Infantry Regiment, in Honesdale
        - Company B, 1st Battalion, 109th Infantry Regiment, in Williamsport
        - Company C, 1st Battalion, 109th Infantry Regiment, in Easton
          - Detachment 1, Company C, 1st Battalion, 109th Infantry Regiment, in Tamaqua
        - Company D (Weapons), 1st Battalion, 109th Infantry Regiment, in Wellsboro
      - 1st Battalion, 110th Infantry Regiment, in Mount Pleasant
        - Headquarters and Headquarters Company, 1st Battalion, 110th Infantry Regiment, in Mount Pleasant
        - Company A, 1st Battalion, 110th Infantry Regiment, in Indiana
        - Company B, 1st Battalion, 110th Infantry Regiment, in Waynesburg
        - Company C, 1st Battalion, 110th Infantry Regiment, in Connellsville
        - Company D (Weapons), 1st Battalion, 110th Infantry Regiment, in Greensburg
      - 1st Battalion, 175th Infantry Regiment, in Dundalk (MD) — (Maryland Army National Guard)
      - 876th Brigade Engineer Battalion, at Johnstown–Cambria County Airport
        - Headquarters and Headquarters Company, 876th Brigade Engineer Battalion, at Johnstown–Cambria County Airport
        - Company A (Combat Engineer), 876th Brigade Engineer Battalion, in Hiller
        - Company B (Combat Engineer), 876th Brigade Engineer Battalion, in Spring City
        - Company C (Signal), 876th Brigade Engineer Battalion, in Washington
        - Company D (Military Intelligence), 876th Brigade Engineer Battalion, in Washington
          - Detachment 1, Company D (Military Intelligence), 876th Brigade Engineer Battalion, at Muir Army Heliport (RQ-28A UAV)
      - 128th Brigade Support Battalion, in Pittsburgh
        - Headquarters and Headquarters Company, 128th Brigade Support Battalion, in Pittsburgh
        - Company A (Distribution), 128th Brigade Support Battalion, in Clearfield
        - Company B (Maintenance), 128th Brigade Support Battalion, in Pittsburgh
        - Company C (Medical), 128th Brigade Support Battalion, in Pittsburgh
        - Company D (Forward Support), 128th Brigade Support Battalion, in Hershey — attached to 1st Squadron, 104th Cavalry Regiment
        - Company E (Forward Support), 128th Brigade Support Battalion, at Johnstown–Cambria County Airport — attached to 876th Brigade Engineer Battalion
        - Company F (Forward Support), 128th Brigade Support Battalion, in Ford City — attached to 1st Battalion, 107th Field Artillery Regiment
        - Company G (Forward Support), 128th Brigade Support Battalion, in Beaver Falls — attached to 1st Battalion, 110th Infantry Regiment
        - Company H (Forward Support), 128th Brigade Support Battalion, in Dundalk (MD) — attached to 1st Battalion, 175th Infantry Regiment (Maryland Army National Guard)
        - Company I (Forward Support), 128th Brigade Support Battalion, in Carbondale — attached to 1st Battalion, 109th Infantry Regiment
    - 56th Stryker Brigade Combat Team, at Horsham Air Guard Station — will convert to a Mobile Brigade Combat Team
      - Headquarters and Headquarters Company, 56th Stryker Brigade Combat Team, at Horsham Air Guard Station
      - 556th Military Intelligence Company, at Horsham Air Guard Station
      - 656th Signal Company, in Torrance
        - Detachment 1, 656th Signal Company, in Philadelphia
      - 865th Engineer Company (Combat), in Punxsutawney
      - Detachment 1, Company M, 56th Mobile Brigade Combat Team, at Muir Army Heliport (RQ-28A UAV)
      - 1st Battalion, 111th Infantry Regiment, in Plymouth Meeting
        - Headquarters and Headquarters Company, 1st Battalion, 111th Infantry Regiment, in Plymouth Meeting
        - Company A, 1st Battalion, 111th Infantry Regiment, in Philadelphia
        - Company B, 1st Battalion, 111th Infantry Regiment, in Coatesville
        - Company C, 1st Battalion, 111th Infantry Regiment, in Kutztown
      - 1st Battalion, 112th Infantry Regiment, in Cambridge Springs
        - Headquarters and Headquarters Company, 1st Battalion, 112th Infantry Regiment, in Cambridge Springs
        - Company A, 1st Battalion, 112th Infantry Regiment, in Butler
        - Company B, 1st Battalion, 112th Infantry Regiment, in Cambridge Springs
        - Company C, 1st Battalion, 112th Infantry Regiment, in Lewis Run
          - Detachment 1, Company C, 1st Battalion, 112th Infantry Regiment, in Butler
      - 2nd Battalion, 112th Infantry Regiment, in Lewistown
        - Headquarters and Headquarters Company, 2nd Battalion, 112th Infantry Regiment, in Lewistown
        - Company A, 2nd Battalion, 112th Infantry Regiment, in Huntingdon
        - Company B, 2nd Battalion, 112th Infantry Regiment, in Duncansville
        - Company C, 2nd Battalion, 112th Infantry Regiment, in Lewisburg
      - 328th Brigade Support Battalion, in Elizabethtown
        - Headquarters and Headquarters Company, 328th Brigade Support Battalion, in Elizabethtown
        - Company A (Distribution), 328th Brigade Support Battalion, in Lebanon
        - Company B (Maintenance), 328th Brigade Support Battalion, in Elizabethtown
        - Company C (Medical), 328th Brigade Support Battalion, in Elizabethtown
        - Company F (Forward Support), 328th Brigade Support Battalion, in Gettysburg — attached to 1st Battalion, 108th Field Artillery Regiment
        - Company G (Forward Support), 328th Brigade Support Battalion, in Plymouth Meeting — attached to 1st Battalion, 111th Infantry Regiment
        - Company H (Forward Support), 328th Brigade Support Battalion, in Cambridge Springs — attached to 1st Battalion, 112th Infantry Regiment
        - Company I (Forward Support), 328th Brigade Support Battalion, in State College — attached to 2nd Battalion, 112th Infantry Regiment
    - 256th Infantry Brigade Combat Team, in Lafayette (LA) — (Louisiana Army National Guard)
    - 28th Division Artillery, in Wilkes-Barre
      - Headquarters and Headquarters Battery, 28th Division Artillery, in Wilkes-Barre
      - 1st Battalion, 107th Field Artillery Regiment, in New Castle
        - Headquarters and Headquarters Battery, 1st Battalion, 107th Field Artillery Regiment, in New Castle
        - Battery A, 1st Battalion, 107th Field Artillery Regiment, in Hermitage
        - Battery B, 1st Battalion, 107th Field Artillery Regiment, in Beaver Falls
        - Battery C, 1st Battalion, 107th Field Artillery Regiment, in Grove City
      - 1st Battalion, 108th Field Artillery Regiment, in Carlisle
        - Headquarters and Headquarters Battery, 1st Battalion, 108th Field Artillery Regiment, in Carlisle
        - Battery A, 1st Battalion, 108th Field Artillery Regiment, in Plymouth
        - Battery B, 1st Battalion, 108th Field Artillery Regiment, in Fayetteville
        - Battery C, 1st Battalion, 108th Field Artillery Regiment, in Philadelphia
      - 1st Battalion, 141st Field Artillery Regiment, in New Orleans (LA) — (Louisiana Army National Guard)
    - 28th Combat Aviation Brigade, at Muir Army Heliport
      - Headquarters and Headquarters Company, 28th Combat Aviation Brigade, at Muir Army Heliport
      - 2nd Battalion (General Support Aviation), 104th Aviation Regiment, at Muir Army Heliport
        - Headquarters and Headquarters Company, 2nd Battalion (General Support Aviation), 104th Aviation Regiment, at Muir Army Heliport
          - Detachment 1, Headquarters and Headquarters Company, 2nd Battalion (General Support Aviation), 104th Aviation Regiment, at Johnstown–Cambria County Airport
          - Detachment 2, Headquarters and Headquarters Company, 2nd Battalion (General Support Aviation), 104th Aviation Regiment, at Bradley Airport (CT) — (Connecticut Army National Guard)
          - Detachment 3, Headquarters and Headquarters Company, 2nd Battalion (General Support Aviation), 104th Aviation Regiment, at Mid-Ohio Valley Airport (WV) — (West Virginia Army National Guard)
        - Company A (CAC), 2nd Battalion (General Support Aviation), 104th Aviation Regiment, at Muir Army Heliport (UH-60L Black Hawk)
        - Company B (Heavy Lift), 2nd Battalion (General Support Aviation), 104th Aviation Regiment, at Muir Army Heliport (CH-47F Chinook)
          - Detachment 1, Company B (Heavy Lift), 2nd Battalion (General Support Aviation), 104th Aviation Regiment, at Bradley Airport (CT) — (Connecticut Army National Guard)
        - Company C (MEDEVAC), 2nd Battalion (General Support Aviation), 104th Aviation Regiment, at Mid-Ohio Valley Airport (WV) (HH-60L Black Hawk) — (West Virginia Army National Guard)
          - Detachment 1, Company C (MEDEVAC), 2nd Battalion (General Support Aviation), 104th Aviation Regiment, at Johnstown–Cambria County Airport
          - Detachment 2, Company C (MEDEVAC), 2nd Battalion (General Support Aviation), 104th Aviation Regiment, at Muir Army Heliport
        - Company D (AVUM), 2nd Battalion (General Support Aviation), 104th Aviation Regiment, at Muir Army Heliport
          - Detachment 1, Company D (AVUM), 2nd Battalion (General Support Aviation), 104th Aviation Regiment, at Johnstown–Cambria County Airport
          - Detachment 2, Company D (AVUM), 2nd Battalion (General Support Aviation), 104th Aviation Regiment, at Bradley Airport (CT) — (Connecticut Army National Guard)
          - Detachment 3, Company D (AVUM), 2nd Battalion (General Support Aviation), 104th Aviation Regiment, at Mid-Ohio Valley Airport (WV) — (West Virginia Army National Guard)
        - Company E (Forward Support), 2nd Battalion (General Support Aviation), 104th Aviation Regiment, at Muir Army Heliport
          - Detachment 1, Company E (Forward Support), 2nd Battalion (General Support Aviation), 104th Aviation Regiment, at Johnstown–Cambria County Airport
          - Detachment 2, Company E (Forward Support), 2nd Battalion (General Support Aviation), 104th Aviation Regiment, at Bradley Airport (CT) — (Connecticut Army National Guard)
          - Detachment 3, Company E (Forward Support), 2nd Battalion (General Support Aviation), 104th Aviation Regiment, at Mid-Ohio Valley Airport (WV) — (West Virginia Army National Guard)
        - Company F (ATS), 2nd Battalion (General Support Aviation), 104th Aviation Regiment, at Muir Army Heliport
        - Company G (MEDEVAC), 2nd Battalion (General Support Aviation), 104th Aviation Regiment, at Lincoln Airport (NE) (HH-60L Black Hawk) — (Nebraska Army National Guard)
          - Detachment 1, Company G (MEDEVAC), 2nd Battalion (General Support Aviation), 104th Aviation Regiment, at West Bend Airport (WI) — (Wisconsin Army National Guard)
          - Detachment 2, Company G (MEDEVAC), 2nd Battalion (General Support Aviation), 104th Aviation Regiment, at Davison Army Airfield (VA) — (District of Columbia Army National Guard)
      - 1st Battalion (Assault), 150th Aviation Regiment, at Joint Base McGuire-Dix-Lakehurst (NJ) — (New Jersey Army National Guard)
        - Company B, 1st Battalion (Assault), 150th Aviation Regiment, at Muir Army Heliport (UH-60M Black Hawk)
      - 1st Battalion (Assault), 230th Aviation Regiment, at Smyrna Airport (TN) — (Tennessee Army National Guard)
        - Company C, 1st Battalion (Assault), 230th Aviation Regiment, at Johnstown–Cambria County Airport (UH-60M Black Hawk)
          - Detachment 1, Headquarters and Headquarters Company, 1st Battalion (Assault), 230th Aviation Regiment, at Johnstown–Cambria County Airport
          - Detachment 1, Company D (AVUM), 1st Battalion (Assault), 230th Aviation Regiment, at Johnstown–Cambria County Airport
          - Detachment 1, Company E (Forward Support), 1st Battalion (Assault), 230th Aviation Regiment, at Johnstown–Cambria County Airport
      - Detachment 1, Company C, 1st Battalion (Assault), 135th Aviation Regiment, at Johnstown–Cambria County Airport (UH-60M Black Hawk)
        - Detachment 1, Headquarters and Headquarters Company, 1st Battalion (Assault), 135th Aviation Regiment, at Johnstown–Cambria County Airport
        - Detachment 1, Company D (AVUM), 1st Battalion (Assault), 135th Aviation Regiment, at Johnstown–Cambria County Airport
        - Detachment 1, Company E (Forward Support), 1st Battalion (Assault), 135th Aviation Regiment, at Johnstown–Cambria County Airport
      - Detachment 1, Company B, 1st Battalion (Security & Support), 224th Aviation Regiment, at Muir Army Heliport (UH-72A Lakota)
      - Detachment 1, Company B, 2nd Battalion (Fixed Wing), 641st Aviation Regiment (Detachment 22, Operational Support Airlift Activity), at Muir Army Heliport (C-12 Huron)
      - 628th Aviation Support Battalion, at Muir Army Heliport
        - Headquarters Support Company, 628th Aviation Support Battalion, at Muir Army Heliport
        - Company A (Distribution), 628th Aviation Support Battalion, at Muir Army Heliport
        - Company B (AVIM), 628th Aviation Support Battalion, at Muir Army Heliport
          - Detachment 1, Company B (AVIM), 628th Aviation Support Battalion, at Joint Base McGuire–Dix–Lakehurst (NJ) — (New Jersey Army National Guard)
          - Detachment 3, Company B (AVIM), 628th Aviation Support Battalion, at McGhee Tyson Airport (TN) — (Tennessee Army National Guard)
        - Company C (Signal), 628th Aviation Support Battalion, at Muir Army Heliport
    - 28th Division Sustainment Brigade, in Springfield (OH) — (Ohio Army National Guard)
      - 728th Division Support Sustainment Battalion, in Spring City
        - Headquarters and Headquarters Company, 728th Division Sustainment Support Battalion, in Spring City
        - Company A (Composite Supply Company), 728th Division Sustainment Support Battalion, in Philadelphia
        - Company B (Support Maintenance Company), 728th Division Sustainment Support Battalion, at Fort Indiantown Gap
        - Company C (Composite Truck Company), 728th Division Sustainment Support Battalion, in Phoenixville
          - Detachment 1, Company C (Composite Truck Company), 728th Division Sustainment Support Battalion, in Philadelphia
          - Detachment 2, Company C (Composite Truck Company), 728th Division Sustainment Support Battalion, at Fort Indiantown Gap
    - 55th Maneuver Enhancement Brigade, in Scranton
      - Headquarters Support Company, 55th Maneuver Enhancement Brigade, in Scranton
        - Detachment 1, Headquarters Support Company, 55th Maneuver Enhancement Brigade, in Lehighton
      - 213th Signal Company, in Tobyhanna
      - 165th Military Police Battalion, at Fort Indiantown Gap
        - Headquarters and Headquarters Detachment, 165th Military Police Battalion, at Fort Indiantown Gap
        - 28th Military Police Company (Combat Support), in Friedens
        - 1069th Military Police Company (Combat Support), in Sellersville
          - Detachment 1, 1069th Military Police Company (Combat Support), at Fort Indiantown Gap
      - 337th Engineer Battalion, in Danville
        - Headquarters and Headquarters Company, 337th Engineer Battalion, in Danville
        - Forward Support Company, 337th Engineer Battalion, in Scranton
        - 128th Chemical Company, in Philadelphia
        - 192nd Engineer Detachment (Fire Fighting Team — Fire Truck), at Fort Indiantown Gap
        - 228th Engineer Company (Vertical Construction Company), at Fort Indiantown Gap
  - 213th Regional Support Group, in Allentown
    - Headquarters and Headquarters Company, 213th Regional Support Group, in Allentown
    - 108th Medical Company (Area Support), in Allentown
    - 109th Mobile Public Affairs Detachment, at Fort Indiantown Gap
    - 213th Human Resources Company, at Fort Indiantown Gap
    - 28th Finance Battalion, in Lebanon
      - Headquarters and Headquarters Detachment, 28th Finance Battalion, in Lebanon
      - 528th Finance Company, in Lebanon
      - 828th Finance Company, in Lebanon
      - 928th Finance Company, in Lebanon
    - 228th Transportation Battalion (Motor), at Fort Indiantown Gap
      - 121st Transportation Company (Medium Truck) (Cargo), at Johnstown–Cambria County Airport
        - Detachment 1, 121st Transportation Company (Medium Truck) (Cargo), at Fort Indiantown Gap
      - 131st Transportation Company (Medium Truck) (Cargo), in Williamstown
        - Detachment 1, 131st Transportation Company (Medium Truck) (Cargo), in Lehighton
  - 166th Regiment, Regional Training Institute, at Fort Indiantown Gap
    - Headquarters and Headquarters Detachment, 166th Regiment, at Fort Indiantown Gap
    - 1st Battalion (Maneuver), 166th Regiment, at Fort Indiantown Gap
    - 2nd Battalion (Modular Training), 166th Regiment, at Fort Indiantown Gap
    - 3rd Battalion (NCO Academy), 166th Regiment, at Fort Indiantown Gap
    - 4th Battalion (Medical Battalion Training Site), 166th Regiment, at Fort Indiantown Gap

Aviation unit abbreviations: CAC — Command Aviation Company; MEDEVAC — Medical evacuation; AVUM — Aviation Unit Maintenance; AVIM — Aviation Intermediate Maintenance; ATS — Air Traffic Service

== See also ==
- Category:Pennsylvania militiamen in the American Revolution
- List of Pennsylvania Civil War regiments
- Pennsylvania State Guard
- List of United States militia units in the American Revolutionary War
