= Joe Crispin =

American basketball coach (born 1979)

- Crispin in 2026

Air Force Falcons
- Title: Head coach
- League: Mountain West Conference

Personal information
- Born: July 18, 1979 (age 47) Woodbury, New Jersey, U.S.
- Listed height: 6 ft 0 in (1.83 m)
- Listed weight: 185 lb (84 kg)

Career information
- High school: Pitman (Pitman, New Jersey)
- College: Penn State (1997–2001)
- NBA draft: 2001: undrafted
- Playing career: 2001–2012
- Position: Point guard
- Number: 11
- Coaching career: 2014–present

Career history

Playing
- 2001: Los Angeles Lakers
- 2001: Southern California Surf
- 2002: Phoenix Suns
- 2002: Gary Steelheads
- 2002–2003: Rockford Lightning
- 2003: AEK Athens
- 2003–2004: Kansas City Knights
- 2004: Pennsylvania ValleyDawgs
- 2004–2005: Kansas City Knights
- 2005: Anwil Wloclawek
- 2005–2006: Navigo.it Teramo
- 2007: CAI Zaragoza
- 2007–2009: Bandırma Banvit
- 2009–2010: Enel Brindisi
- 2010–2011: Basket Barcellona
- 2011–2012: Azovmash Mariupol

Coaching
- 2014–2016: Rowan (assistant)
- 2016–2023: Rowan
- 2023–2026: Penn State (assistant)
- 2026–present: Air Force

Career highlights
- As player: ABA MVP (2004); ABA All-Star (2005); ABA All Star-Game (2005); First-team All-Big Ten (2001); Second-team All-Big Ten (2000); As head coach: NJAC regular season (2023); NJAC tournament (2019)
- Stats at NBA.com
- Stats at Basketball Reference

Joseph Steven Crispin (born July 18, 1979) is an American men's college basketball coach and former player. He is currently the head coach of the Air Force Falcons men's basketball team. He previously served as an assistant coach for the Penn State Nittany Lions and as the head coach for the Rowan Profs.

== Early life ==
Crispin was born at Underwood-Memorial Hospital in Woodbury, New Jersey.

He later starred as a point guard for Pitman High School, leading the Panthers to the New Jersey Group I state championship in 1997 while setting the Gloucester County all-time scoring record for boys' high school basketball. He averaged 35.6 points per game during his junior and senior seasons, and 24.9 points per game across his entire high school career. Across 117 career games, he failed to score at least 10 points only once.

== College career ==
Crispin played college basketball at Penn State alongside his brother, Jon Crispin. The brothers were part of the 2001 Penn State team that upset national powerhouse North Carolina in the NCAA tournament.

== Professional career ==
=== NBA career ===
Crispin played in the NBA during the 2001-02 season, splitting time between the Los Angeles Lakers and Phoenix Suns. He signed with the Miami Heat in 2003 but was waived before the 2003–04 season began.

=== Overseas career ===
Crispin has also played in the ABA, CBA, USBL, with Anwil Włocławek of the Polish Basketball League, with Teramo in Italy, and with Banvit of the Turkish Basketball League. He signed with Barcellona Pozzo di Gotto in Italy for the 2010–11 season. The next season, he joined Azovmash Mariupol in Ukraine.

== Coaching career ==
On March 18, 2026, Crispin was announced as the next head men's basketball coach at the United States Air Force Academy. He had previously spent several years as the head coach at Rowan University and as an assistant coach at Penn State.

== Head coaching record ==
Record table
Season	Team	Overall	Conference	Standing	Postseason
Rowan Profs (New Jersey Athletic Conference) (2016–2023)
2016–17	Rowan	17–10	11–7	4th	
2017–18	Rowan	13–13	9–9	T-5th	
2018–19	Rowan	22–7	13–5	2nd	NCAA Division III Second Round
2019–20	Rowan	15–12	10–8	T-4th	
2020–21	Rowan	—	—	—	Season canceled due to COVID-19
2021–22	Rowan	23–6	14–4	2nd	NCAA Division III First Round
2022–23	Rowan	24–6	16–2	1st	NCAA Division III Sweet 16
Rowan:		90–54 (.625)	57–35 (.620)		
Air Force Falcons (Mountain West Conference) (2026–present)
2026–27	Air Force	3–1	0–0		
Air Force:		3–1 (.750)	0–0 (–)		
Total:		93–55 (.628)			
National champion Postseason invitational champion Conference regular season champion Conference regular season and conference tournament champion Division regular season champion Division regular season and conference tournament champion Conference tournament champion

== Personal life ==
Crispin and his wife Erin lived in Glassboro, New Jersey while he was the head coach at Rowan.
