= Pitman Grove =

Historic house in New Jersey, United States

- U.S. National Register of Historic Places
- U.S. Historic district
- New Jersey Register of Historic Places
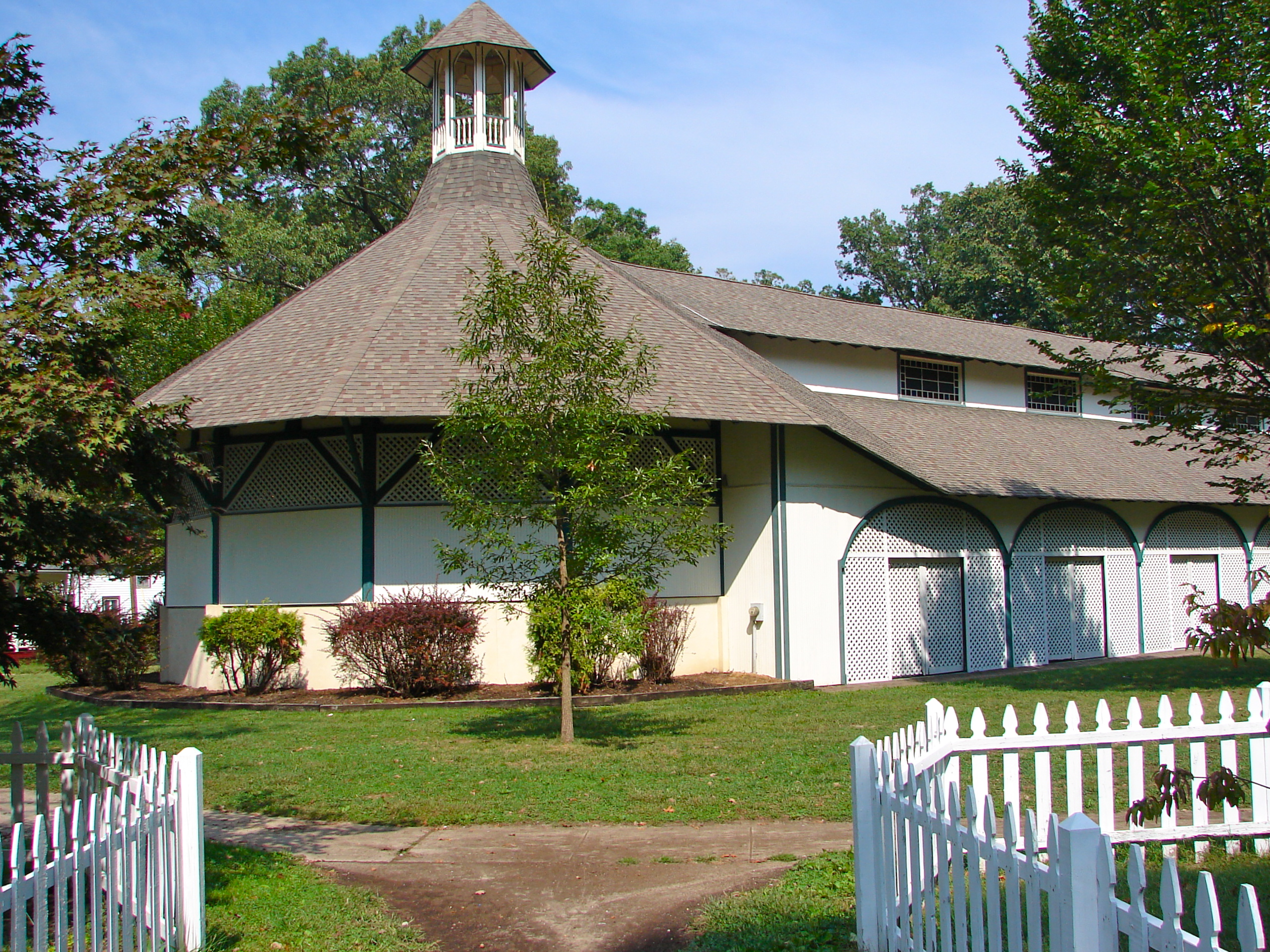
- Pitman Grove Camp Meeting Auditorium

- Location within Gloucester County, New Jersey Location within New Jersey Location within the United States
- Location: Bounded by Holly, East, Laurel, and West Avenues (both sides), Pitman, New Jersey
- Coordinates: 39°43′50″N 75°7′58″W
- Area: 20 acres (8.1 ha)
- Architectural style: Second Empire, Italianate
- NRHP reference No.: 77000870
- NJRHP No.: 1412

Significant dates
- Added to NRHP: August 19, 1977
- Designated NJRHP: July 10, 1976

Pitman Grove is a 20-acre (8.1 ha) historic district located in the borough of Pitman in Gloucester County, New Jersey. It was added to the National Register of Historic Places on August 19, 1977, for its significance in architecture, religion, and community planning. The district includes 349 contributing buildings.

The Grove centers around a circular park where the Pitman Grove Auditorium was constructed. Twelve numbered avenues, lined with cottages, radiate from this circle like spokes on the hub of a wheel.

The Grove was established in 1871 as a Methodist summer camp meeting site. From its early days, it attracted a large number of visitors. In 1892, a reporter for The Philadelphia Record recorded 60,000 visitors over a 16-day period. Increasingly, people started to live in the Grove year-round. In 1905, it became a part of the Borough of Pitman.

== Pitman Grove Auditorium ==
The first structure on this site was a temporary “preaching stand” built in 1871. This was quickly replaced by a twelve-sided pavilion, about fifty feet in diameter capped by a cupola, covering a stage raised off the ground and protected by a wood railing at its perimeter. In 1878, the Auditorium was remodeled, and a new, rectangular-plan wing added to provide seating capacity. The building was expanded in 1911 adding 24-foot side aisles at both the north and south elevations. Gas lanterns lit the Auditorium beginning in the early 1880s with electrical arch lights added in 1897.

Architectural features include: colored Queen Anne Style windows, a combination of vertical board and batten siding with shingled siding above at the east end entrance, and a three-bay arrangement of a wide central aisle flanked to each side by a smaller side aisle.

The auditorium changed in the early 1960s to reflect a more modern style. An extensive renovation in 1993-94 attempted to restore the building to its pre-1911 appearance. Despite renovations over time, many original materials and features remain.

Built by the New Jersey Camp Meeting Association the auditorium continues to be used for camp meetings each summer as well as a place of secular assembly throughout the year. It is now owned by the Borough of Pitman.

Other nearby Camp Meeting Association buildings included: Whitecar Tabernacle which was located on the unit block of Fourth Avenue and was used mainly for children's religious services and instruction. Lizzie Smith Temple was located at the corner of Wesley and South Avenues.

== Gallery ==
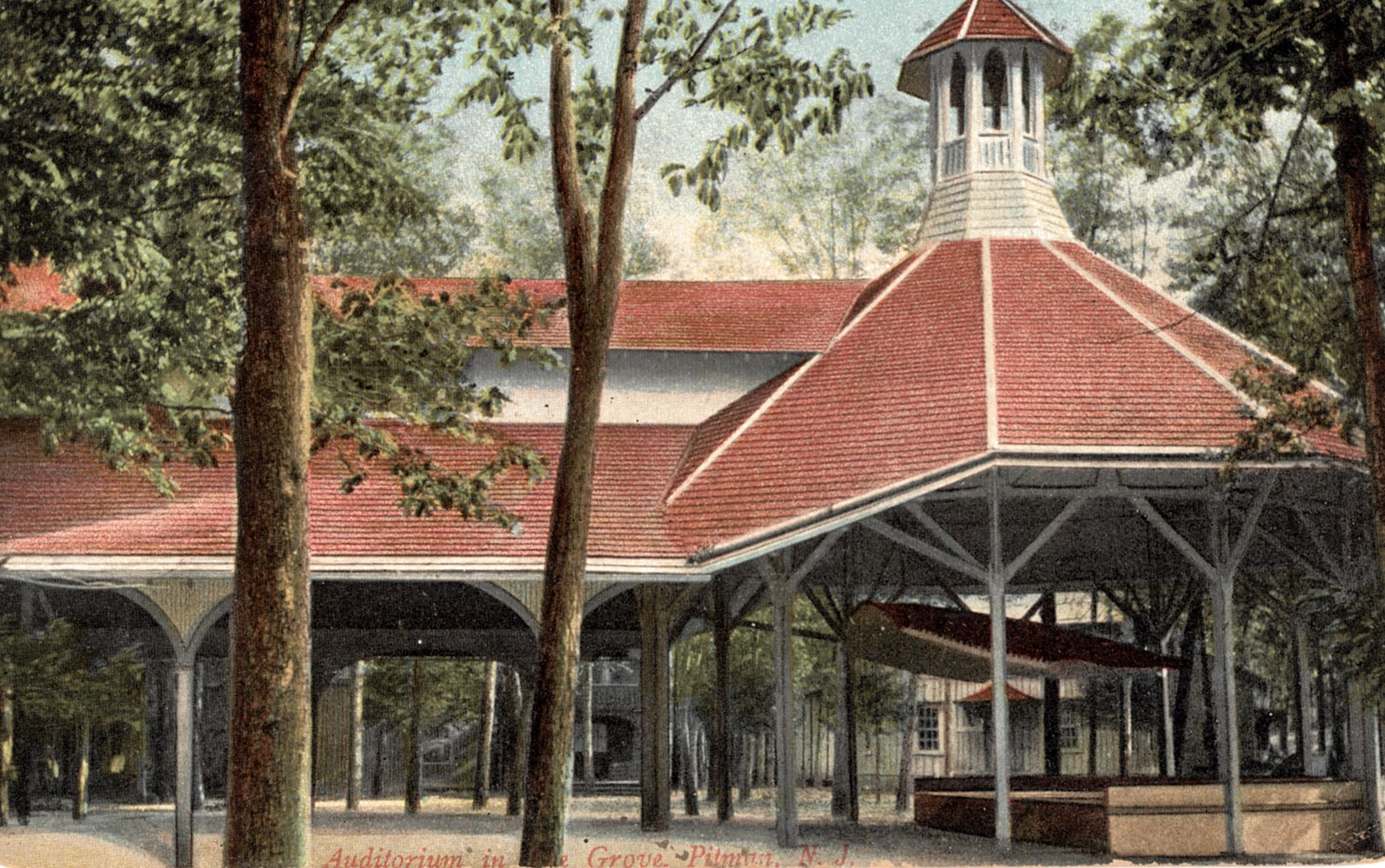
The auditorium in a postcard from 1908

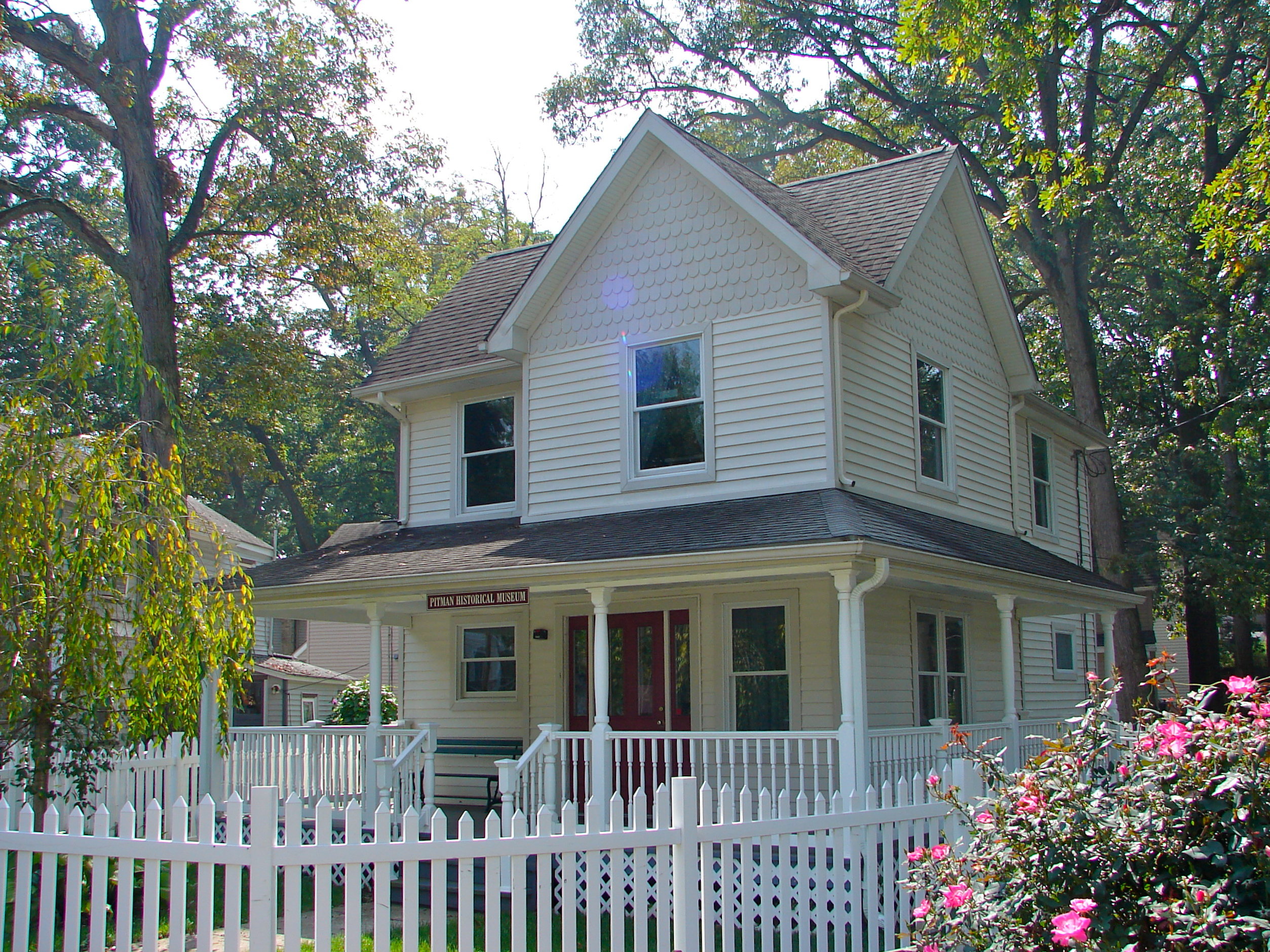
Pitman Grove Museum

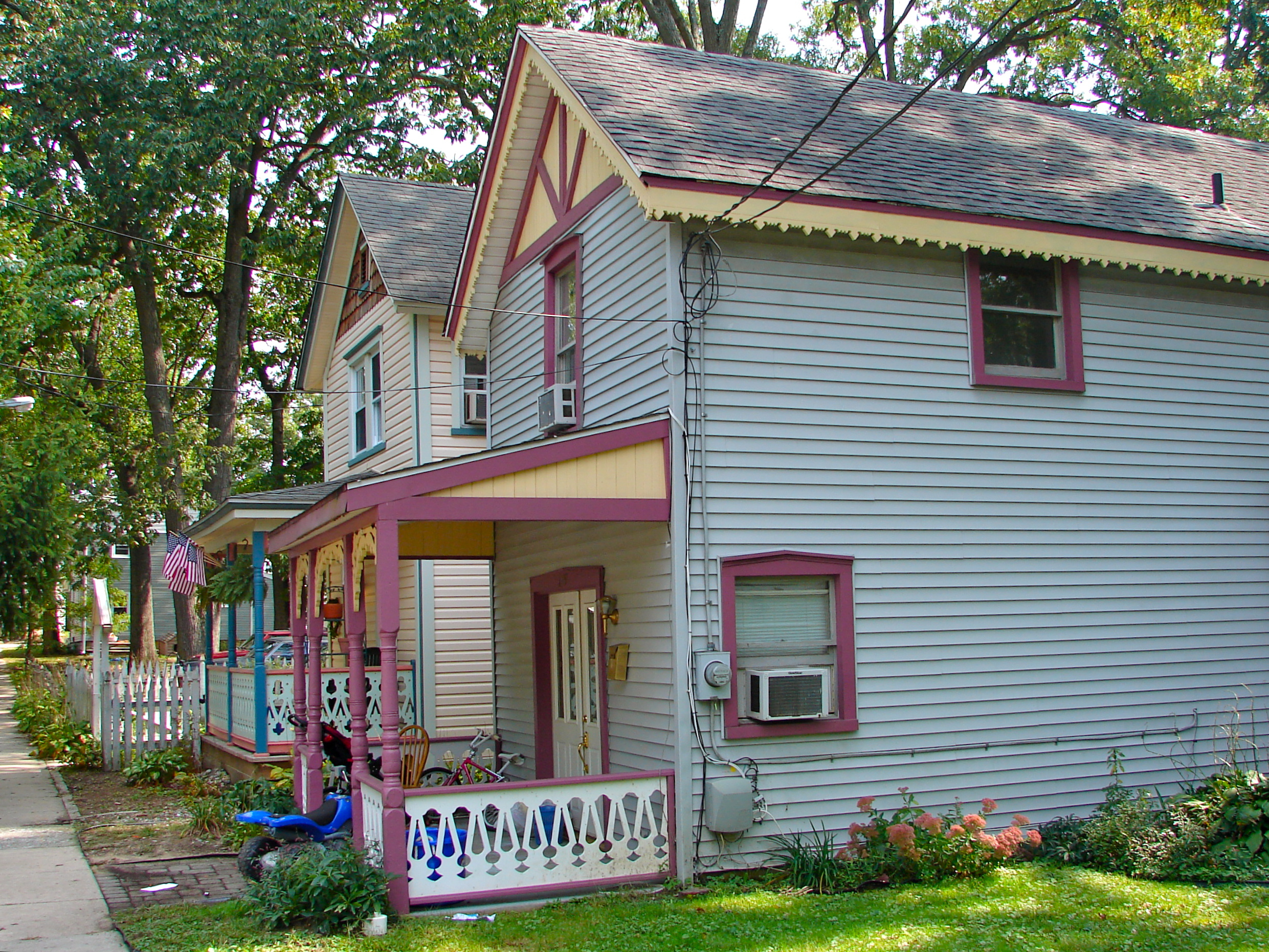
Houses in Pitman Grove

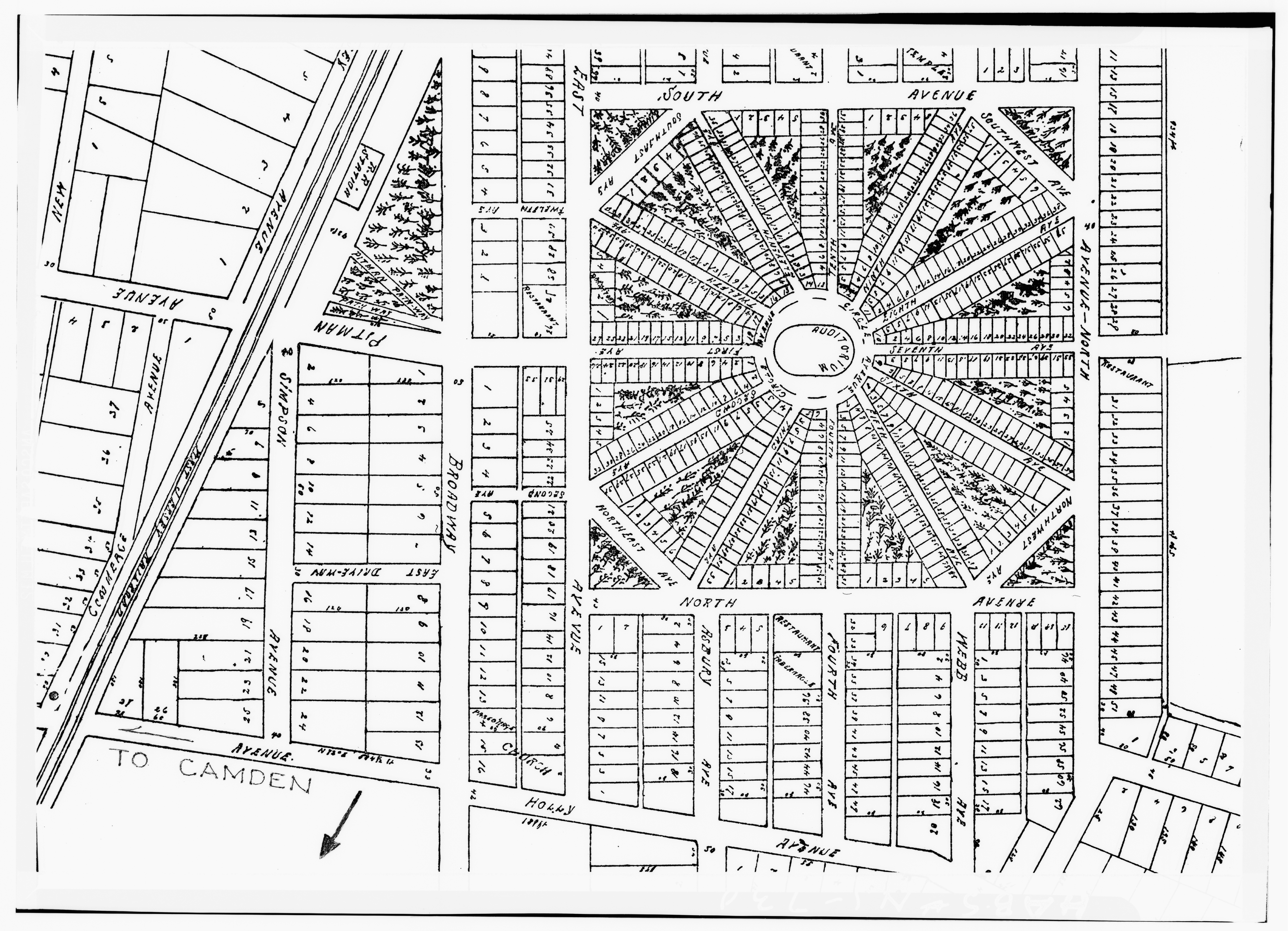
Map of Pitman including the Grove

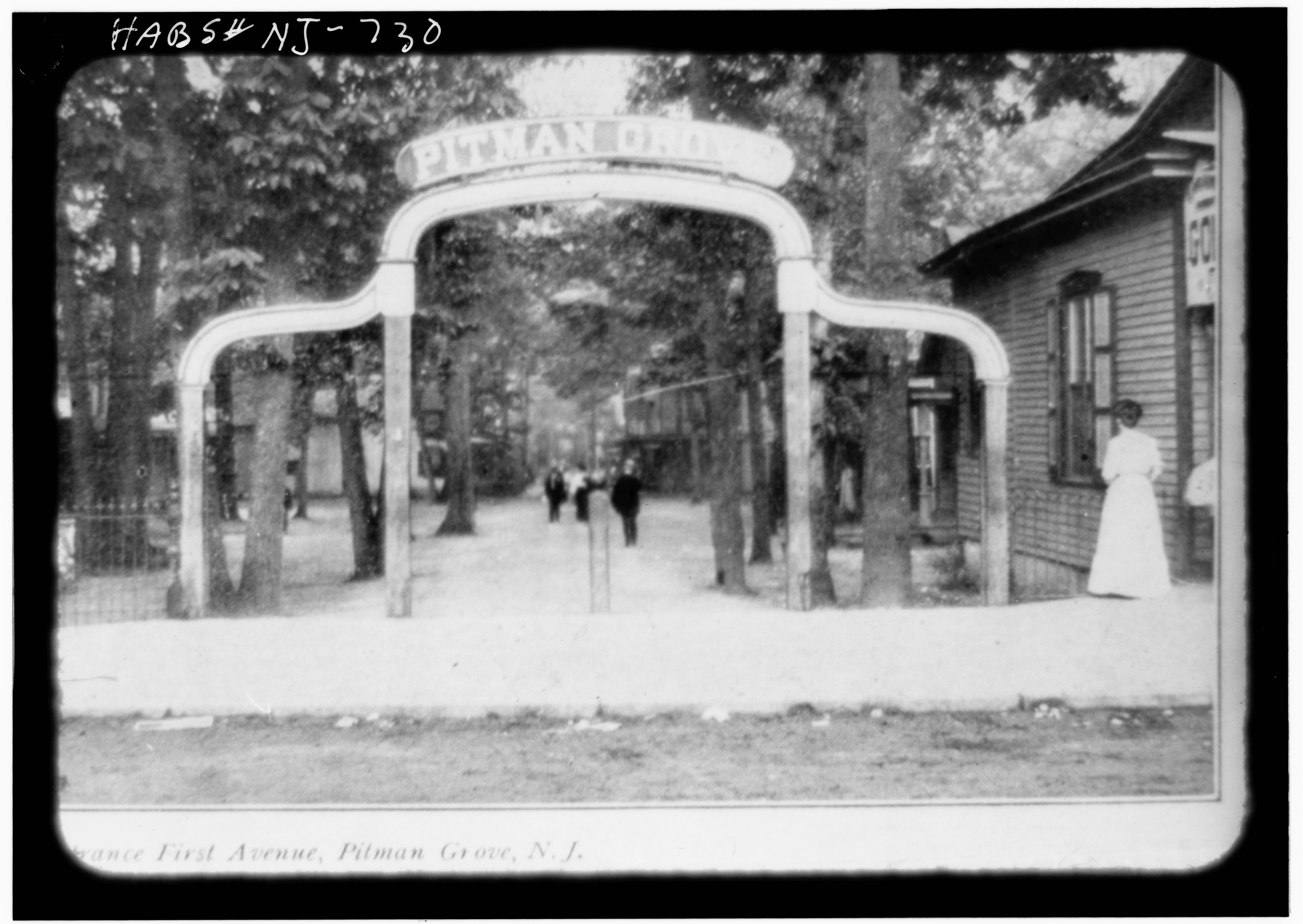
Grove entrance, c. 1890

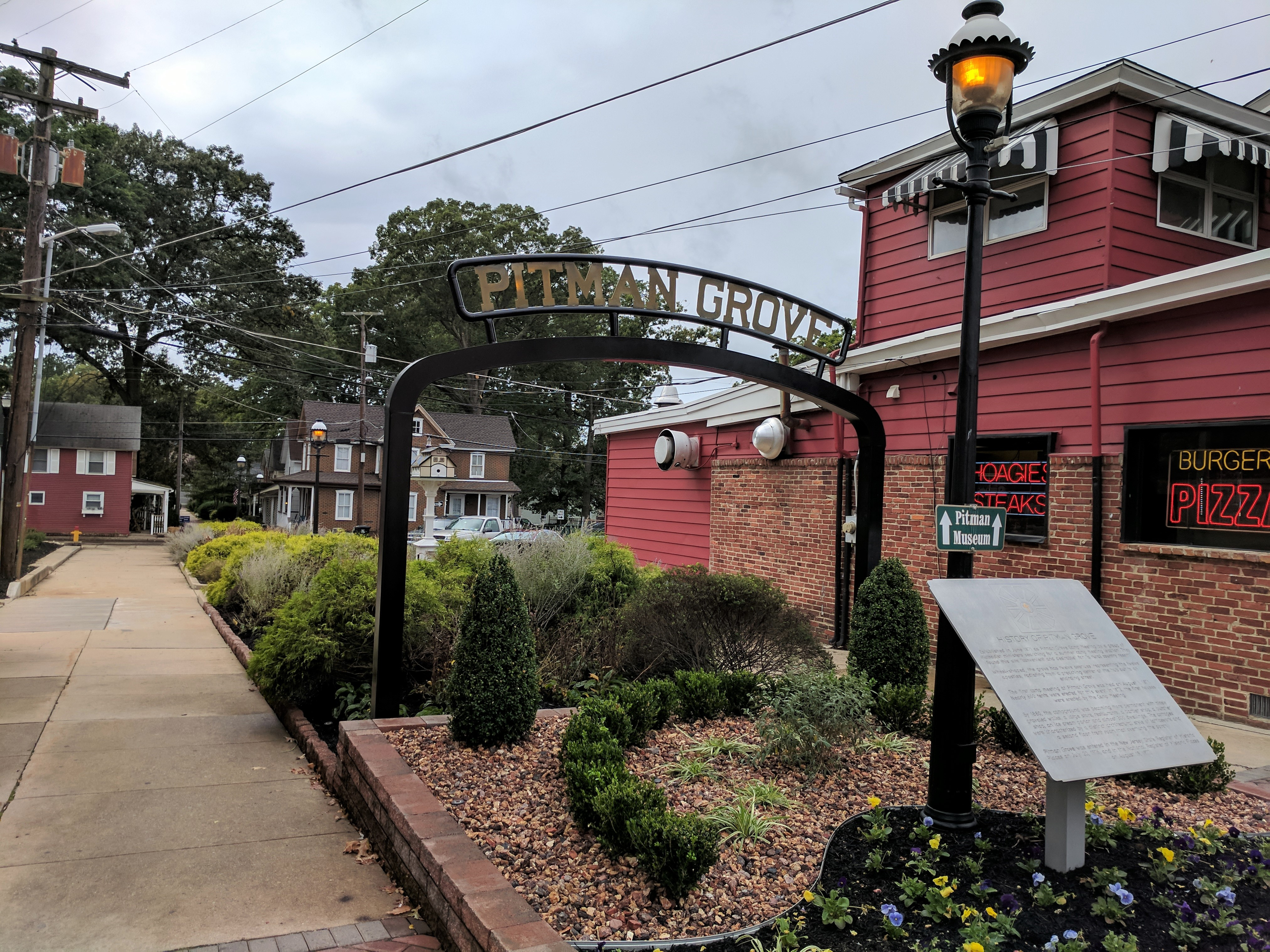
Grove entrance, 2017

== See also ==
- National Register of Historic Places listings in Gloucester County, New Jersey
