= Pitman School District =

School district in Gloucester County, New Jersey, US

Address
- 420 Hudson Avenue Pitman, Gloucester County, New Jersey, 08071; United States
- Coordinates: 39.734455°N 75.139453°W

District information
- Grades: PreK-12
- Superintendent: Robert Preston
- Business administrator: Robert Miles
- Schools: 3

Students and staff
- Enrollment: 1,147 (as of 2023–24)
- Faculty: 104.3 FTEs
- Student–teacher ratio: 11.0:1

Other information
- District Factor Group: FG
- Website: www.pitman.k12.nj.us
Ind.	Per pupil	District spending	Rank (*)	K-12 average	%± vs. average
1A	Total Spending	$17,273	18	$18,891	−8.6%
1	Budgetary Cost	14,057	28	14,783	−4.9%
2	Classroom Instruction	8,607	31	8,763	−1.8%
6	Support Services	2,183	31	2,392	−8.7%
8	Administrative Cost	1,551	18	1,485	4.4%
10	Operations & Maintenance	1,309	8	1,783	−26.6%
13	Extracurricular Activities	361	13	268	34.7%
16	Median Teacher Salary	65,954	40	64,043
Data from NJDoE 2014 Taxpayers' Guide to Education Spending. *Of K-12 districts with up to 1,800 students. Lowest spending=1; Highest=49

The Pitman School District is a comprehensive community public school district that serves students in pre-kindergarten through twelfth grade from Pitman, in Gloucester County, in the U.S. state of New Jersey.

As of the 2023–24 school year, the district, comprised of three schools, had an enrollment of 1,147 students and 104.3 classroom teachers (on an FTE basis), for a student–teacher ratio of 11.0:1.

== History ==
The district had been classified by the New Jersey Department of Education as being in District Factor Group "FG", the fourth-highest of eight groupings. District Factor Groups organize districts statewide to allow comparison by common socioeconomic characteristics of the local districts. From lowest socioeconomic status to highest, the categories are A, B, CD, DE, FG, GH, I and J.

Due to a loss of state aid, the board of education announced in April 2023 a reconfiguration plan for the school district under which two elementary schools would be closed. Beginning with the 2023–24 school year the district was restructured so that Memorial School serves grades PreK–1, Pitman Elementary School (housed at the former Pitman Middle School) covers grades 2–6 and Pitman Junior/Senior High School houses students in grades 7–12.

The students of W. C. K. Walls Elementary School and Elwood Kindle Elementary School voted on the new name for their school and selected Pitman Elementary School. This name was approved by the board of education.

== Schools ==
Schools in the district (with 2023–24 enrollment data from the National Center for Education Statistics) are:

Elementary schools

- Memorial Elementary School with 228 students in grades PreK–1
  - Kiersten Miller, principal
- Pitman Elementary School with 413 students in grades 2–6
  - Karolyn Mason, principal

High school

- Pitman Junior / Senior High School with 487 students in grades 7–12
  - Kristen Stewart, principal

== Administration ==
Core members of the district's administration are:

- Robert Preston, superintendent
- Chris DeStratis, business administrator and board secretary

== Board of education ==
The district's board of education, comprised of seven members, sets policy and oversees the fiscal and educational operation of the district through its administration. As a Type II school district, the board's trustees are elected directly by voters to serve three-year terms of office on a staggered basis, with either two or three seats up for election each year held (since 2012) as part of the November general election. The board appoints a superintendent to oversee the district's day-to-day operations and a business administrator to supervise the business functions of the district.
