= Jon Crispin =

American basketball player (born 1981)

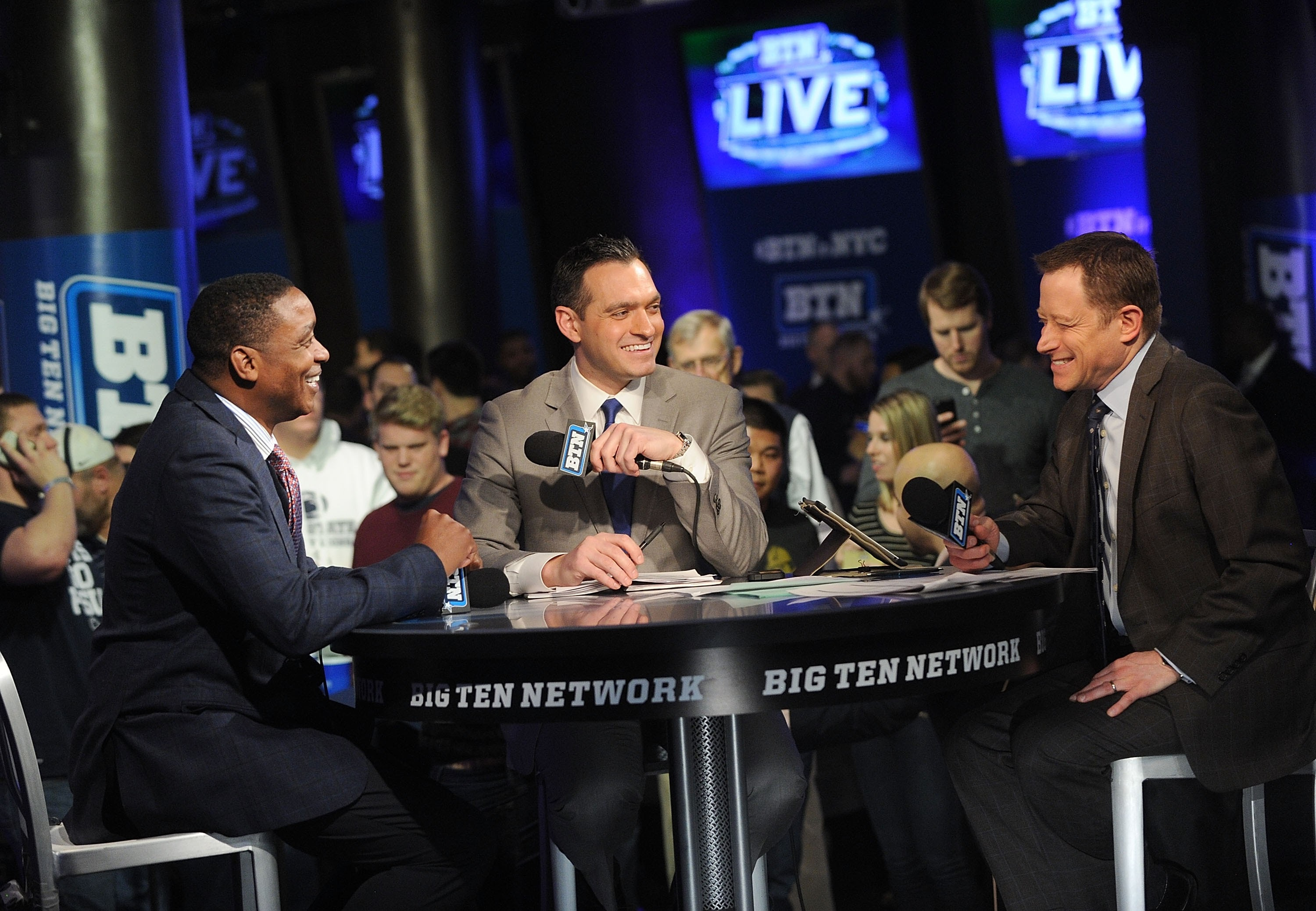
- Crispin on Big Ten Network in 2016

Personal information
- Born: January 19, 1981 (age 45) Woodbury, New Jersey, U.S.
- Listed height: 6 ft 2 in (1.88 m)
- Listed weight: 195 lb (88 kg)

Career information
- High school: Pitman (Pitman, New Jersey)
- College: Penn State (1999–2001); UCLA (2002–2004)
- NBA draft: 2004: undrafted
- Position: Shooting guard

Jonathan Scott Crispin (born January 19, 1981) is a basketball analyst and color commentator for ESPN, NBC and Peacock. In college, he played basketball for the Penn State Nittany Lions and UCLA Bruins.

== Early years ==
=== Personal ===
Jonathan Scott Crispin was born on January 19, 1981, at Underwood-Memorial Hospital in Woodbury, New Jersey to parents Steven and Susan Crispin; he has a brother and two sisters. His older brother is former high school and Penn State teammate Joe Crispin. Joe had a brief NBA career. His father Steve played football at Villanova. Jon's grandfather Cliff was a two-sport (baseball and basketball) athlete at Temple (1957–59) and played in the 1958 Final Four. Cliff also owns the Maryland state high school boys' basketball single game scoring record of 79, set in 1956.

=== Pitman High School ===
Crispin attended his hometown Pitman High School from 1995 to 1999. He became a four-year starter on the varsity basketball team, two of which were alongside his older brother Joe. As a senior, he earned an "All-Group All-State" second-team honor. For three straight years he earned Group I All-State honors. During his prep basketball career, Crispin led the Panthers to two conference titles, two South Jersey crowns and two Group I NJ State Championships (1997 & 1998).

As a junior in 1998, Jon scored a school-record 62 points (21–35 FG, 12–19 threes) in a South Jersey Group I playoff game versus Penns Grove High School. He eventually ended his prep career as fourth on Gloucester County's all-time scoring charts after collecting 2,319 points. His brother Joe finished top in Gloucester County history after having scored 2,651 points.

Jon was a multi-sport star, also having lettered twice in baseball and three times in football. He was All-Tri-County Conference in football twice and once in baseball. Jon received multiple high-major Division I offers for football and garnered significant attention from MLB scouts as a pitcher.

== College ==
=== Penn State ===
Jon followed older brother Joe to play basketball for the Nittany Lions in State College, Pennsylvania. As a true freshman (1999–2000) he started 22 of 31 games played. Jon finished the season as the team's fourth highest scorer (9.3 ppg / 228 total) despite missing four games in February due to a foot stress fracture.

As a sophomore (2000–01), Crispin started 31 of 33 games but averaged a diminished 7.2 points. He was fifth in scoring (7.2 / 236) and most of his statistics dipped a little from his freshman season. Jon's best performance came when he scored a career-high 26 points in the Nittany Lions' 73–68 upset at Kentucky on November 25, 2000 in the Wildcats' home opener. He was also a starter throughout the 2001 NCAA Men's Division I Basketball Tournament and helped Penn State reach the Sweet 16. The 84–72 loss against Temple would be the last time he and Joe would ever play as high school or collegiate teammates.

=== UCLA ===
Jon decided to transfer to the national basketball powerhouse UCLA Bruins prior to the start of his junior season. Due to NCAA transfer eligibility rules, Crispin was forced to sit out the 2001–02 season.

After becoming eligible for his red-shirted junior season in 2002–03, Crispin played in 23 games (one start) while averaging 2.3 points. His 37.9 three-point percentage ranked second on the team while his 90.0 free throw percentage ranked first. He was voted Lindy's Number 3 College Basketball Transfer in the nation prior to the season.

Jon Crispin's final college season (2003–04) had him see action in only nine total games, two of which were starts. He scored 18 points all season for a 2.0 per game average. However, Jon was awarded the Elvin C. Ducky Drake Memorial Award, presented annually to "the member of the UCLA basketball team selected for his competitive spirit, inspiration and unselfish contribution to the team."

== Post-college ==
After college, Jon spent two years playing professional basketball overseas (in Spain and Ireland), as well as in the ABA in the States. During and following his professional playing career, Jon was filmed in numerous television commercials including Ruby Tuesday's, Nike, and Coca-Cola, as well as modeled for print advertisements.

When he resided in Los Angeles, California, Jon began his broadcasting career working for Fox Sports Radio, Fox Sports, Time Warner SportsNet, the Big Ten Network, and ESPN as a radio show host, college basketball analyst, and in-game color commentator. Jon previously served as the lead basketball analyst and color commentator for the Big Ten Network in Chicago, Illinois. He now is a color commentator for ESPN, NBC and Peacock.
