= 2005 ABA All-Star Game =

Annual mid-season exhibition

2006 ABA All-Star Game
West	East
163	149
- Venue: Thomas & Mack Center, Las Vegas
- MVP: Lou Kelly

The 2005 American Basketball Association All-Star Game was held at the 17,923 seat Thomas & Mack Center in Las Vegas, where West defeated East, 163–149. Lou Kelly of the Las Vegas Rattlers was named the Most Valuable Player. The big names of the event were the former NBA players Lawrence Moten, Joe Crispin, Todd Day and Anthony Miller. The latter who played 7 seasons in the NBA joined Atlanta Vision mid-season from the Atlanta Hawks.

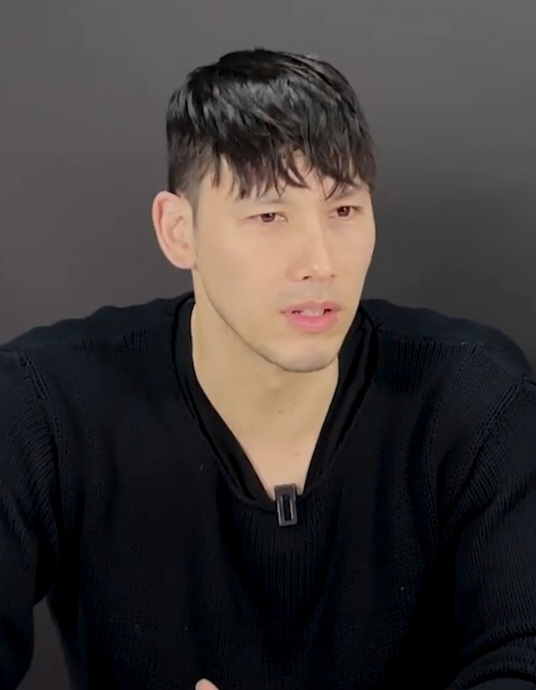
American-Korean Eric Sandrin was selected for the West

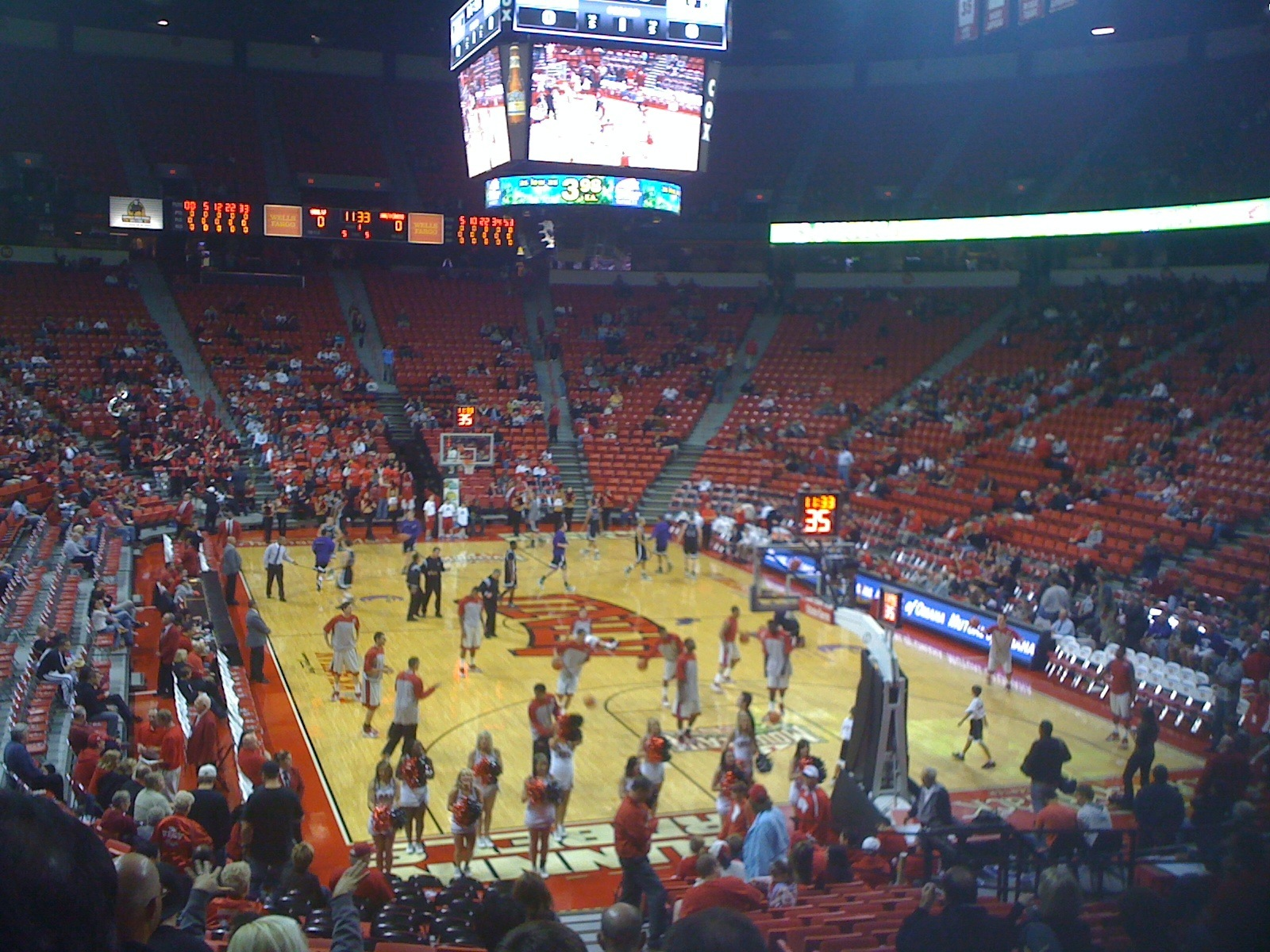

|Inside the arena before UNLV basketball game

== The Game ==
The winning West team was led by Lou Kelly, a UNLV who graduate scored 32 points in the All-Star game and was named the game MVP, Daryl Dorsey from Indiana who added 26 points and Todd Day with 25.

The best player for the Eats teams was Randy Gill who performed for 27 points, 15 rebounds and 10 assists. Antwain Barbour and Willie Shaw with 25 and 23 points respectively, also shone for the East All-Stars.

== All-Star teams ==
=== Rosters ===
East All-Stars
Pos.	Player	Team	Previous appearances
Starters
G	Derrick Washington	New Jersey SkyCats	
C	Edmund Saunders	New Jersey SkyCats	
F	Antwain Barbour	Kentucky Colonels	
G	Randy Gill	Maryland Nighthawks	
F	Lawrence Moten	Maryland Nighthawks	
Reserves
G	Detrick White	Mississippi Stingers	
G	Tim Henderson	Mississippi Stingers	
F	Branden Vincent	Mississippi Stingers	
G	Brett Harper	Carolina Thunder	
F	Willie Shaw	Harlem Strong Dogs	
F	Obadiah Toppin	Harlem Strong Dogs	
C	Anthony Miller	Atlanta Vision	
G	Detrick Stevens	Baton Rouge Cajun Pelicans	
Alternates
F	David Shelton	Cincinnati Monarchs	
F	Dontae' Jones	Nashville Rhythm	

West All-Stars
Pos.	Player	Team	Appearance
Starters
G	Donald Harris	Texas Tycoons	
F	DeRon Rutledge	Texas Tycoons	
G	Chris Davis	Texas Tycoons	
F	Kareem Reid	Arkansas RimRockers	
F	Todd Day	Arkansas RimRockers	
Reserves
G	Brian Jackson	Arkansas RimRockers	
C	Gene Shipley	Tijuana Diablos	
G	Curtis Slaughter	Ontario Warriors	
C	(South Korea) Eric Sandrin	Bellevue Blackhawks	
F	Robert Day	Portland Reign	
F	Lou Kelly	Las Vegas Rattlers	
G	Daryl Dorsey	Las Vegas Rattlers	
G	Joe Crispin	Kansas City Knights	
Alternates
F	Kevin Melson	Kansas City Knights	
G	Demetrius Porter	Central Valley Dawgs	
F	Harold Arceneaux	Utah Snowbears	
F	Alex Austin	Utah Snowbears	

== Former NBA players ==
- Anthony Miller
- Todd Day
- Lawrence Moten
- Joe Crispin

== See also ==
- 2006 ABA All-Star Game
