= Pitman, New Jersey =

Borough in Gloucester County, New Jersey, US

- Borough
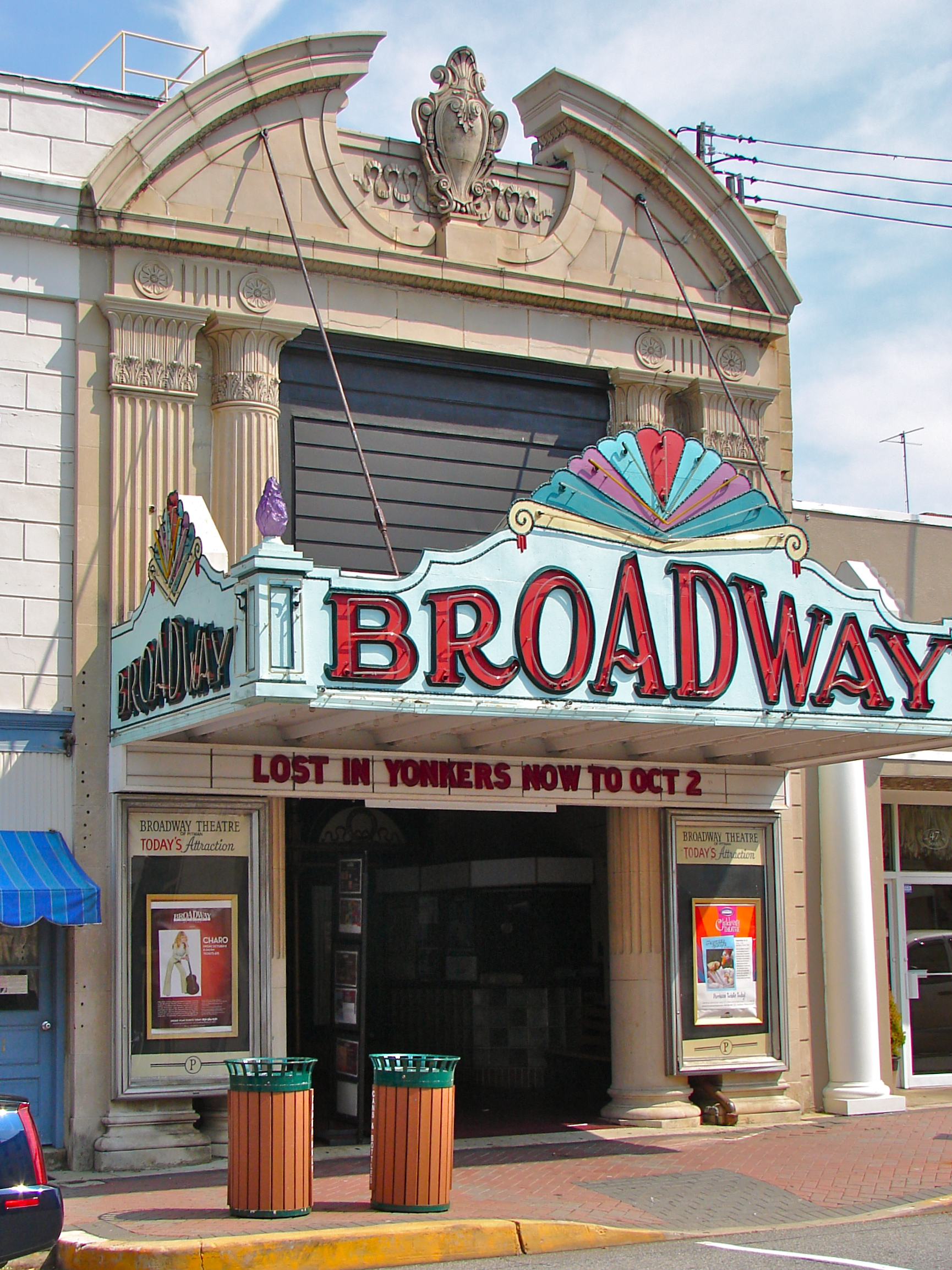
- Broadway Theater in Pitman, September 2010

- Seal
- Mottoes: "The Small Town With A Big Heart" "Everybody Likes Pitman"
- Map of Pitman highlighted within Gloucester County. Inset: Location of Gloucester County in New Jersey.

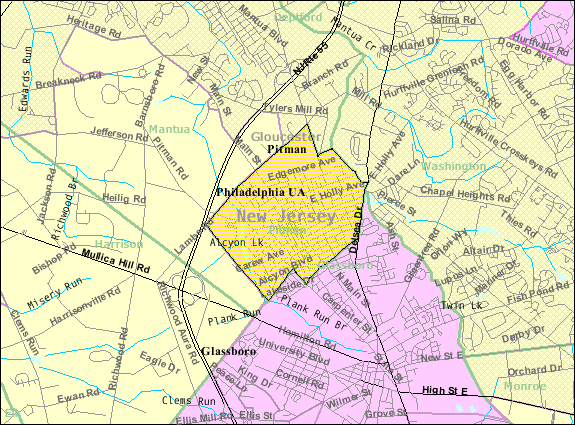
- Census Bureau map of Pitman, New Jersey

- Location in Gloucester County Location in New Jersey Location in the United States
- Coordinates: 39.733094°N 75.129673°W
- Country: United States
- State: New Jersey
- County: Gloucester
- Incorporated: May 24, 1905

Government
  - Type: Borough
  - Body: Borough Council
  - Mayor: Michael L. Razze Jr. (R, term ends December 31, 2027)
  - Administrator / Municipal clerk: Sandra McCafferty

Area
  - Total: 2.26 sq mi (5.85 km^{2})
  - Land: 2.22 sq mi (5.75 km^{2})
  - Water: 0.042 sq mi (0.11 km^{2}) 1.81%
  - Rank: 390th of 565 in state 17th of 24 in county
- Elevation: 125 ft (38 m)

Population (2020)
  - Total: 8,780
  - Estimate (2023): 8,880
  - Rank: 271st of 565 in state 13th of 24 in county
  - Density: 3,958.5/sq mi (1,528.4/km^{2})
  - Rank: 159th of 565 in state 3rd of 24 in county
- Time zone: UTC−05:00 (Eastern (EST))
  - Summer (DST): UTC−04:00 (Eastern (EDT))
- ZIP Code: 08071
- Area code: 856
- FIPS code: 3401559070
- GNIS feature ID: 0885354
- Website: www.pitman.org

Pitman is a borough in Gloucester County, in the U.S. state of New Jersey. As of the 2020 United States census, the borough's population was 8,780, a decrease of 231 (−2.6%) from the 2010 census count of 9,011, which in turn reflected a decline of 320 (−3.4%) from the 9,331 in the 2000 census. The borough was named for Rev. Charles Pitman, a Methodist minister.

== History ==
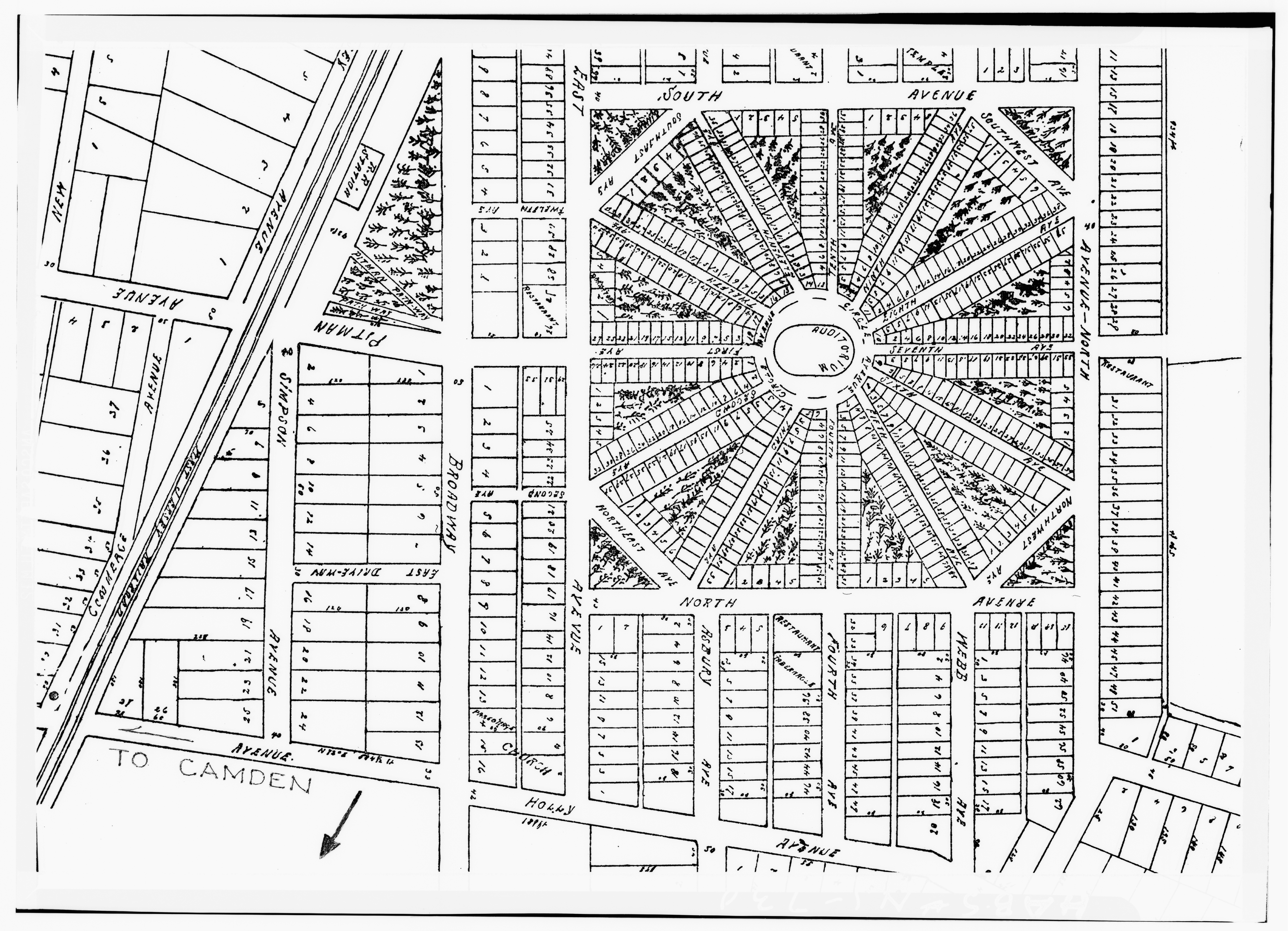
Map of Pitman including the Grove

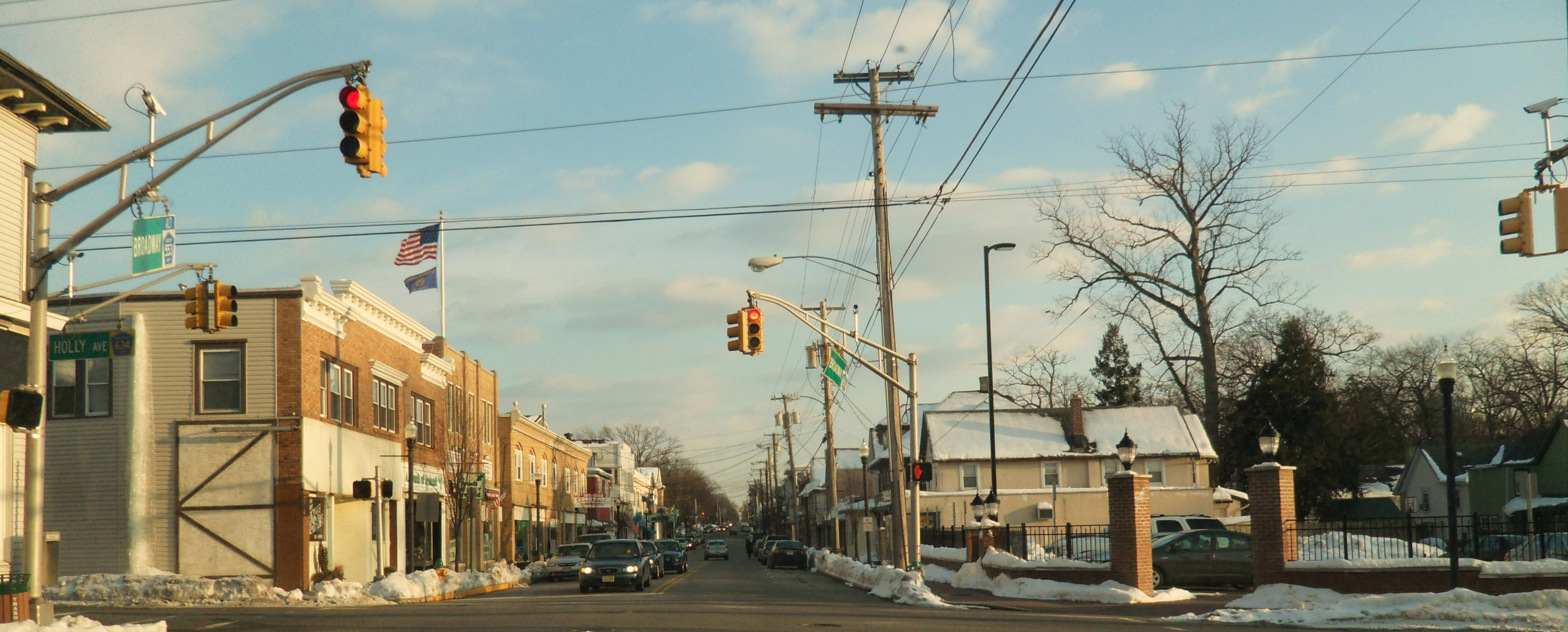
The intersection at Broadway leads to Uptown Pitman, lined with shops, restaurants, and bakeries

In 1871, land was chosen in both Glassboro and Mantua Township to be set aside for a Methodist summer camp meeting. The New Jersey Conference Camp Meeting Association was officially chartered and given authority over the land grant in 1872, and began planning the campground and organizing meetings. The land had an auditorium located on a central meeting ground, and twelve roads originated from the central area as spokes on a wheel.

This area became known as the Pitman Grove, and while worshipers' tents originally lined each of the twelve roads, cottages slowly replaced the tents and formed the foundation of the town of Pitman. By the 1880s, the number of cottages had climbed to 400 and residents had begun staying year-round, both of which led to the establishment of the first public school in 1884. By 1887, businesses had cropped up north of the Grove in an area then-named Arbutus Hill, and in 1892, Alcyon Park was established. The Grove directors resisted the secularization of the Methodist retreat, but in 1904, Grove residents voted 122 to 35 for incorporation as an autonomous borough. On May 24, 1905, Governor of New Jersey Edward C. Stokes signed a law granting the incorporation.

The Pitman Grove was added to the National Register of Historic Places in 1977.

Until August 2014, Pitman was a dry town. In 2015, the borough council authorized an ordinance permitting liquor licenses and a pair of local breweries opened in Pitman's Uptown business district in 2016 under the terms of a state law that allows the sale of beer by the glass in tasting rooms. In November 2016, nearly 65% of voters approved a non-binding referendum allowing the issuance of liquor licenses.

== Geography ==
According to the U.S. Census Bureau, the borough had a total area of 2.26 square miles (5.85 km^{2}), including 2.22 square miles (5.75 km^{2}) of land and 0.04 square miles (0.11 km^{2}) of water (1.81%). The borough borders the Gloucester County municipalities of Glassboro, Mantua Township, and Washington Township.

== Demographics ==
Historical population
Census	Pop.	Note	%±
1910	1,950		—
1920	3,385		73.6%
1930	5,411		59.9%
1940	5,507		1.8%
1950	6,960		26.4%
1960	8,644		24.2%
1970	10,257		18.7%
1980	9,744		−5.0%
1990	9,365		−3.9%
2000	9,331		−0.4%
2010	9,011		−3.4%
2020	8,780		−2.6%
2023 (est.)	8,880	▲	1.1%
Population sources: 1910–2000 1910–1920 1910; 1910–1930 1940–2000; 2000 2010 2020

=== 2020 census ===
As of the 2020 census, Pitman had a population of 8,780. The median age was 41.5 years. 19.9% of residents were under the age of 18 and 18.4% of residents were 65 years of age or older. For every 100 females there were 90.6 males, and for every 100 females age 18 and over there were 86.6 males age 18 and over.

100.0% of residents lived in urban areas, while 0.0% lived in rural areas.

There were 3,410 households in Pitman, of which 28.7% had children under the age of 18 living in them. Of all households, 49.7% were married-couple households, 16.1% were households with a male householder and no spouse or partner present, and 27.5% were households with a female householder and no spouse or partner present. About 27.5% of all households were made up of individuals and 11.5% had someone living alone who was 65 years of age or older.

There were 3,693 housing units, of which 7.7% were vacant. The homeowner vacancy rate was 1.4% and the rental vacancy rate was 13.4%.

Racial composition as of the 2020 census
Race	Number	Percent
White	8,019	91.3%
Black or African American	122	1.4%
American Indian and Alaska Native	5	0.1%
Asian	73	0.8%
Native Hawaiian and Other Pacific Islander	0	0.0%
Some other race	75	0.9%
Two or more races	486	5.5%
Hispanic or Latino (of any race)	346	3.9%

=== 2010 census ===
The 2010 United States census counted 9,011 people, 3,489 households, and 2,327 families in the borough. The population density was 3,976.1 inhabitants per square mile (1,535.2/km^{2}). There were 3,705 housing units at an average density of 1,634.8 per square mile (631.2/km^{2}). The racial makeup was 96.08% (8,658) White, 1.14% (103) Black or African American, 0.09% (8) Native American, 0.62% (56) Asian, 0.03% (3) Pacific Islander, 0.64% (58) from other races, and 1.39% (125) from two or more races. Hispanic or Latino of any race were 2.46% (222) of the population.

Of the 3,489 households, 29.0% had children under the age of 18; 51.1% were married couples living together; 11.5% had a female householder with no husband present and 33.3% were non-families. Of all households, 28.6% were made up of individuals and 13.2% had someone living alone who was 65 years of age or older. The average household size was 2.51 and the average family size was 3.11.

22.4% of the population were under the age of 18, 8.2% from 18 to 24, 24.4% from 25 to 44, 28.1% from 45 to 64, and 16.9% who were 65 years of age or older. The median age was 41.2 years. For every 100 females, the population had 86.8 males. For every 100 females ages 18 and older there were 83.0 males.

The Census Bureau's 2006–2010 American Community Survey showed that (in 2010 inflation-adjusted dollars) median household income was $67,234 (with a margin of error of +/− $7,656) and the median family income was $92,120 (+/− $9,726). Males had a median income of $50,119 (+/− $5,616) versus $46,806 (+/− $6,937) for females. The per capita income for the borough was $30,777 (+/− $2,034). About 4.4% of families and 6.1% of the population were below the poverty line, including 6.7% of those under age 18 and 4.9% of those age 65 or over.

=== 2000 census ===
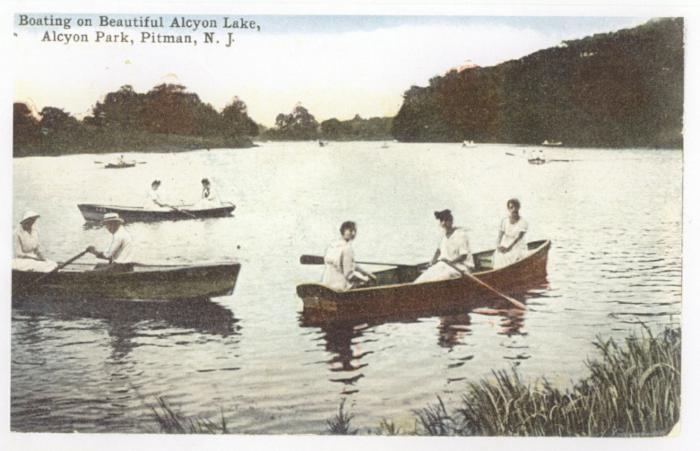
Alcyon Lake

As of the 2000 United States census, there were 9,331 people, 3,473 households, and 2,431 families residing in the borough. The population density was 4,068.3 inhabitants per square mile (1,570.8/km^{2}). There were 3,653 housing units at an average density of 1,592.7 per square mile (614.9/km^{2}). The racial makeup of the borough was 97.16% White, 0.91% African American, 0.12% Native American, 0.62% Asian, 0.01% Pacific Islander, 0.23% from other races, and 0.95% from two or more races. Hispanic or Latino of any race were 1.41% of the population.

There were 3,473 households, out of which 34.0% had children under the age of 18 living with them, 55.5% were married couples living together, 10.9% had a female householder with no husband present, and 30.0% were non-families. Of all households 26.0% were made up of individuals, and 11.1% had someone living alone who was 65 years of age or older. The average household size was 2.60 and the average family size was 3.15.

In the borough, the population was spread out, with 25.2% under the age of 18, 7.9% from 18 to 24, 28.3% from 25 to 44, 23.5% from 45 to 64, and 15.0% who were 65 years of age or older. The median age was 38 years. For every 100 females, there were 86.9 males. For every 100 females age 18 and over, there were 83.3 males.

The median income for a household in the borough was $49,743, and the median income for a family was $59,419. Males had a median income of $40,894 versus $30,889 for females. The per capita income for the borough was $22,133. About 2.8% of families and 5.6% of the population were below the poverty line, including 5.0% of those under age 18 and 8.9% of those age 65 or over.

== Government ==
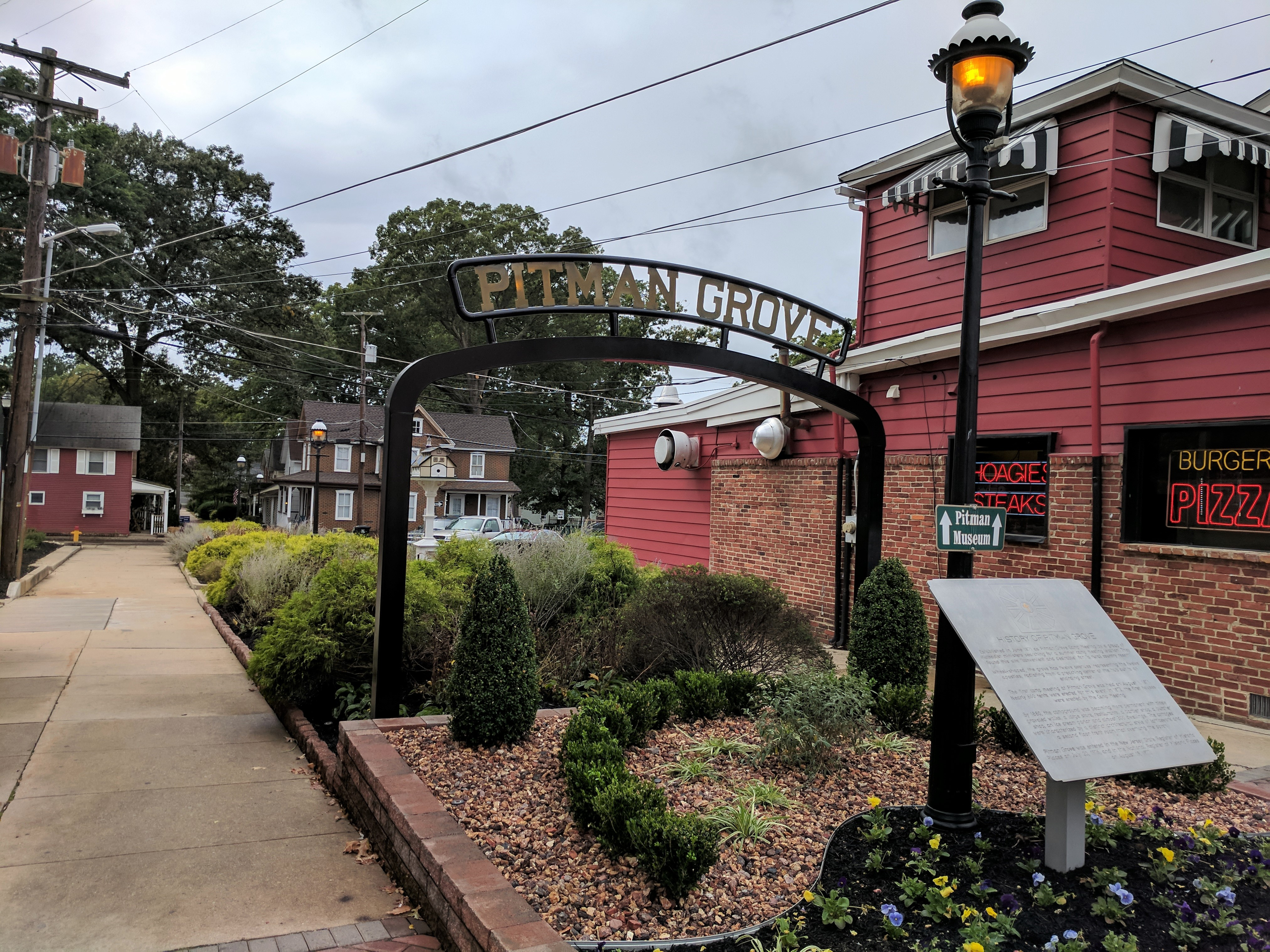
The entrance to Pitman Grove

=== Local government ===
Pitman is governed under the borough form of New Jersey municipal government, one of 218 of 564 municipalities statewide that use this form of government, the most common in the state. The governing body is comprised of a mayor and a borough council, with all positions elected at-large on a partisan basis as part of the November general election. A mayor is elected directly by the voters to a four-year term of office. The borough council includes six members elected to serve three-year terms on a staggered basis, with two seats coming up for election each year in a three-year cycle. The borough form of government used by Pitman is a "weak mayor / strong council" government in which council members act as the legislative body with the mayor presiding at meetings and voting only in the event of a tie. The mayor can veto ordinances subject to an override by a two-thirds majority vote of the council. The mayor makes committee and liaison assignments for council members, and most appointments are made by the mayor with the advice and consent of the council.

As of 2025, the mayor of Pitman Borough is Republican Michael L. Razze, Jr., whose term of office ends December 31, 2027. Members of the Pitman Borough Council are Council President Vanessa James (D, 2025), John Fitzpatrick (R, 2025), Debra Guarni (D, 2027), Adam Mazzola (D, 2026), Sarah Musto (R, 2027) and Robert Uyehara (D, 2026).

=== Federal, state, and county representation ===
Pitman is located in the 1st Congressional District and is part of New Jersey's 3rd state legislative district.

For the 119th United States Congress, New Jersey's 1st congressional district is represented by Donald Norcross (D, Camden). New Jersey is represented in the United States Senate by Democrats Cory Booker (Newark, term ends 2027) and Andy Kim (Moorestown, term ends 2031).

For the 2026–2027 session, the 3rd legislative district of the New Jersey Legislature is represented in the State Senate by John Burzichelli (D, Paulsboro) and in the General Assembly by David Bailey (D, Woodstown) and Heather Simmons (D, Glassboro).

Gloucester County is governed by a board of county commissioners, whose seven members are elected at-large to three-year terms of office on a staggered basis in partisan elections, with either two or three seats coming up for election each year. At a reorganization meeting held each January, the Board selects a Director and a Deputy Director from among its members. As of 2025, Gloucester County's Commissioners are:

Director Frank J. DiMarco (D, Deptford Township, 2025), Matt Weng (D, Pitman, 2026), Joann Gattinelli (D, Washington Township, 2026), Nicholas DeSilvio (R, Franklin Township, 2027), Denice DiCarlo (D, West Deptford Township, 2025) Deputy Director Jim Jefferson (D, Woodbury, 2026) and Christopher Konawel Jr. (R, Glassboro, 2027).

Gloucester County's constitutional officers are: Clerk James N. Hogan (D, Franklin Township; 2027), Sheriff Carmel Morina (D, Greenwich Township; 2027) and Surrogate Giuseppe "Joe" Chila (D, Woolwich Township; 2028).

=== Politics ===
United States presidential election results for Pitman 2024 2020 2016 2012 2008 2004
Year	Republican		Democratic		Third party(ies)	
Year	No.	%	No.	%	No.	%
2024	2,408	45.53%	2,764	52.26%	117	2.21%
2020	2,526	45.52%	2,888	52.05%	135	2.43%
2016	2,139	46.48%	2,211	48.04%	252	5.48%
2012	2,036	45.67%	2,340	52.49%	82	1.84%
2008	2,164	45.34%	2,529	52.99%	80	1.68%
2004	2,369	49.58%	2,345	49.08%	64	1.34%

As of March 2011, there were a total of 6,118 registered voters in Pitman, of which 1,840 (30.1%) were registered as Democrats, 1,446 (23.6%) were registered as Republicans and 2,824 (46.2%) were registered as Unaffiliated. There were 8 voters registered as Libertarians or Greens.

Gubernatorial election results for Pitman
Year	Republican		Democratic		Third party(ies)	
Year	No.	%	No.	%	No.	%
2025	1,994	43.84%	2,513	55.26%	41	0.90%
2021	1,961	51.88%	1,776	46.98%	43	1.14%
2017	1,288	42.01%	1,673	54.57%	105	3.42%
2013	1,842	60.95%	1,095	36.23%	85	2.81%
2009	1,498	47.18%	1,373	43.24%	304	9.57%
2005	1,481	46.35%	1,568	49.08%	146	4.57%

In the 2012 presidential election, Democrat Barack Obama received 52.5% of the vote (2,340 cast), ahead of Republican Mitt Romney with 45.7% (2,036 votes), and other candidates with 1.8% (82 votes), among the 4,508 ballots cast by the borough's 6,297 registered voters (50 ballots were spoiled), for a turnout of 71.6%. In the 2008 presidential election, Democrat Barack Obama received 52.4% of the vote (2,529 cast), ahead of Republican John McCain with 44.8% (2,164 votes) and other candidates with 1.7% (80 votes), among the 4,828 ballots cast by the borough's 6,486 registered voters, for a turnout of 74.4%. In the 2004 presidential election, Republican George W. Bush received 49.3% of the vote (2,369 ballots cast), outpolling Democrat John Kerry with 48.8% (2,345 votes) and other candidates with 1.0% (64 votes), among the 4,804 ballots cast by the borough's 6,350 registered voters, for a turnout percentage of 75.7.

In the 2013 gubernatorial election, Republican Chris Christie received 61.0% of the vote (1,842 cast), ahead of Democrat Barbara Buono with 36.2% (1,095 votes), and other candidates with 2.8% (85 votes), among the 3,090 ballots cast by the borough's 6,157 registered voters (68 ballots were spoiled), for a turnout of 50.2%. In the 2009 gubernatorial election, Republican Chris Christie received 46.4% of the vote (1,498 ballots cast), ahead of Democrat Jon Corzine with 42.5% (1,373 votes), Independent Chris Daggett with 8.4% (270 votes) and other candidates with 1.1% (34 votes), among the 3,231 ballots cast by the borough's 6,255 registered voters, yielding a 51.7% turnout.

United States Senate election results for Pitman1
Year	Republican		Democratic		Third party(ies)	
Year	No.	%	No.	%	No.	%
2024	2,348	45.02%	2,774	53.18%	94	1.80%
2018	1,955	49.46%	1,826	46.19%	172	4.35%
2012	1,858	42.96%	2,337	54.03%	130	3.01%
2006	1,578	49.25%	1,525	47.60%	101	3.15%

United States Senate election results for Pitman2
Year	Republican		Democratic		Third party(ies)	
Year	No.	%	No.	%	No.	%
2020	2,548	46.55%	2,786	50.90%	140	2.56%
2014	1,273	49.19%	1,260	48.69%	55	2.13%
2013	871	52.09%	772	46.17%	29	1.73%
2008	2,007	44.55%	2,373	52.67%	125	2.77%

== Education ==
Pitman School District serves public school students in pre-kindergarten through twelfth grade. As of the 2023–24 school year, the district, comprised of three schools, had an enrollment of 1,147 students and 104.3 classroom teachers (on an FTE basis), for a student–teacher ratio of 11.0:1. Schools in the district (with 2023–24 enrollment data from the National Center for Education Statistics) are Memorial Elementary School with 228 students in grades PreK–1, Pitman Elementary School with 413 students in grades 2–6 and Pitman Junior / Senior High School with 487 students in grades 7–12.

Guardian Angels Regional School is a K–8 school that operates under the auspices of the Roman Catholic Diocese of Camden and accepts students from Clayton. Its PreK-3 campus is in Gibbstown while its 4-8 campus is in Paulsboro. Our Lady Queen of Peace Church in Pitman is one of the sending parishes.

== Transportation ==
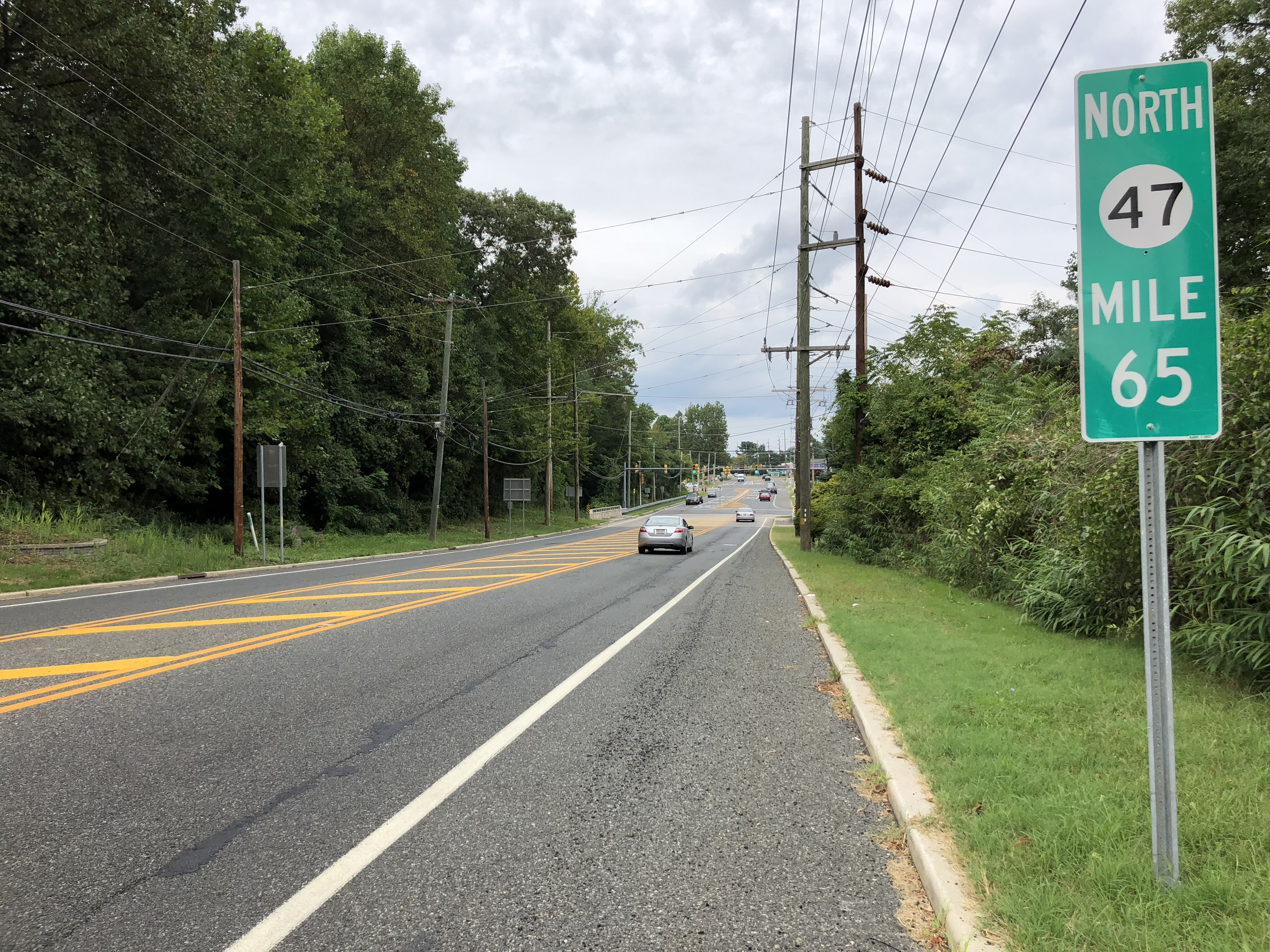
Route 47 northbound the east edge of Pitman

=== Roads and highways ===
As of May 2010, the borough had a total of 37.20 miles (59.87 km) of roadways, of which 29.77 miles (47.91 km) were maintained by the municipality and 7.43 miles (11.96 km) by Gloucester County.

Route 47 is the main highway directly serving Pitman, running along the borough's eastern border with Glassboro. County Route 553, and County Route 553 Alternate are the main county roads passing through Pitman. Route 55 passes just to the west of Pitman in neighboring Mantua Township.

=== Public transportation ===
NJ Transit provides bus service between the borough and Philadelphia on the 313, 408 and 412 routes.

The community is a planned stop on the Glassboro–Camden Line, an 18-mile (28.97 km) diesel multiple unit (DMU) light rail system that was projected for completion in 2019. However, as of 2019, completion is not expected until 2025.

== Notable people ==
People who were born in, residents of, or otherwise closely associated with Pitman include:

- George Anastasia (born 1947), author and journalist
- Hank Beebe (1926–2023), composer who was known for his choral compositions and Broadway musicals
- Madeline Brewer (born 1992), actress best known for her roles in "Orange is the New Black" and "The Handmaid's Tale"
- Joe Crispin (born 1979), Gloucester County's all-time leading scorer for boys' high school basketball (2,651 career points) who played in the NBA for the Lakers and Suns
- Jon Crispin (born 1981), Gloucester County's fourth all-time leading boys' scorer (2,319 career points) in high school. Played collegiately for two seasons at Penn State with brother Joe, then transferred and spent last two seasons with the UCLA Bruins
- Preston Foster (1900–1970), actor
- Harry Gamble (1930–2014), football coach and executive
- Erica Scanlon Harr (born 1982), Miss New Jersey 2004
- John E. Hunt (1908–1989), represented New Jersey's 1st congressional district in the United States House of Representatives from 1967 to 1975
- C. Austin Miles (1868–1946), prolific writer of thousands of hymns and gospel songs, who was best known for his 1912 hymn "In the Garden"
- Jane Moffet (1930–2018), utility player who played for four seasons in the All-American Girls Professional Baseball League
- Patti Smith (born 1946), singer-songwriter, poet and visual artist
- John E. Wallace Jr. (born 1942), former Associate Justice of the New Jersey Supreme Court
- Don Wildman (born 1961), actor and television host
