= Pitman High School =

High school in Gloucester County, New Jersey, US

Pitman Junior / Senior High School

Location
- 225 Linden Avenue; Pitman, Gloucester County, New Jersey 08071; United States
- Coordinates: 39.73991°N 75.127429°W

Information
- Type: Public high school
- School district: Pitman School District
- NCES School ID: 341308002616
- Principal: Kristen Stewart
- Faculty: 46.8 FTEs
- Grades: 7–12
- Enrollment: 487 (as of 2023–24)
- Student to teacher ratio: 10.4:1
- Colors: Orange black
- Athletics conference: Tri-County Conference (general); West Jersey Football League (football)
- Team name: Panthers
- Yearbook: Talisman
- Website: phs.pitman.k12.nj.us

Pitman Junior / Senior High School (commonky known as Pitman High School) is a comprehensive community public high school in Pitman, in Gloucester County, in the U.S. state of New Jersey, serving students in seventh through twelfth grades as the lone secondary school of the Pitman School District.

As of the 2023–24 school year, the school had an enrollment of 487 students and 46.8 classroom teachers (on an FTE basis), for a student–teacher ratio of 10.4:1. There were 69 students (14.2% of enrollment) eligible for free lunch and 17 (3.5% of students) eligible for reduced-cost lunch.

== History ==
The district created its first high school program in 1922; before which students were sent to either Glassboro High School and Woodbury High School. In June 1926, a group of 50 students became the first graduates of the high school. A new Pitman High School opened in September 1926, having been constructed at a cost of $225,000 (equivalent to $4.1 million in 2025). That building was repurposed as a middle school after the current high school building was completed in 1972.

Students from Mantua Township had attended Pitman High School as part of a sending/receiving relationship until Clearview Regional High School opened in September 1960. Pitman officials had notified the Mantua Township School District that its incoming ninth grade students could no longer be accepted at the Pitman school after September 1958.

Due to a loss of state aid, the board of education announced in April 2023 a reconfiguration plan for the school district under which two elementary schools would be closed. Beginning with the 2023–24 school year the district was restructured so that Pitman Junior/Senior High School houses students in grades 7–12.

== Awards, recognition and rankings ==
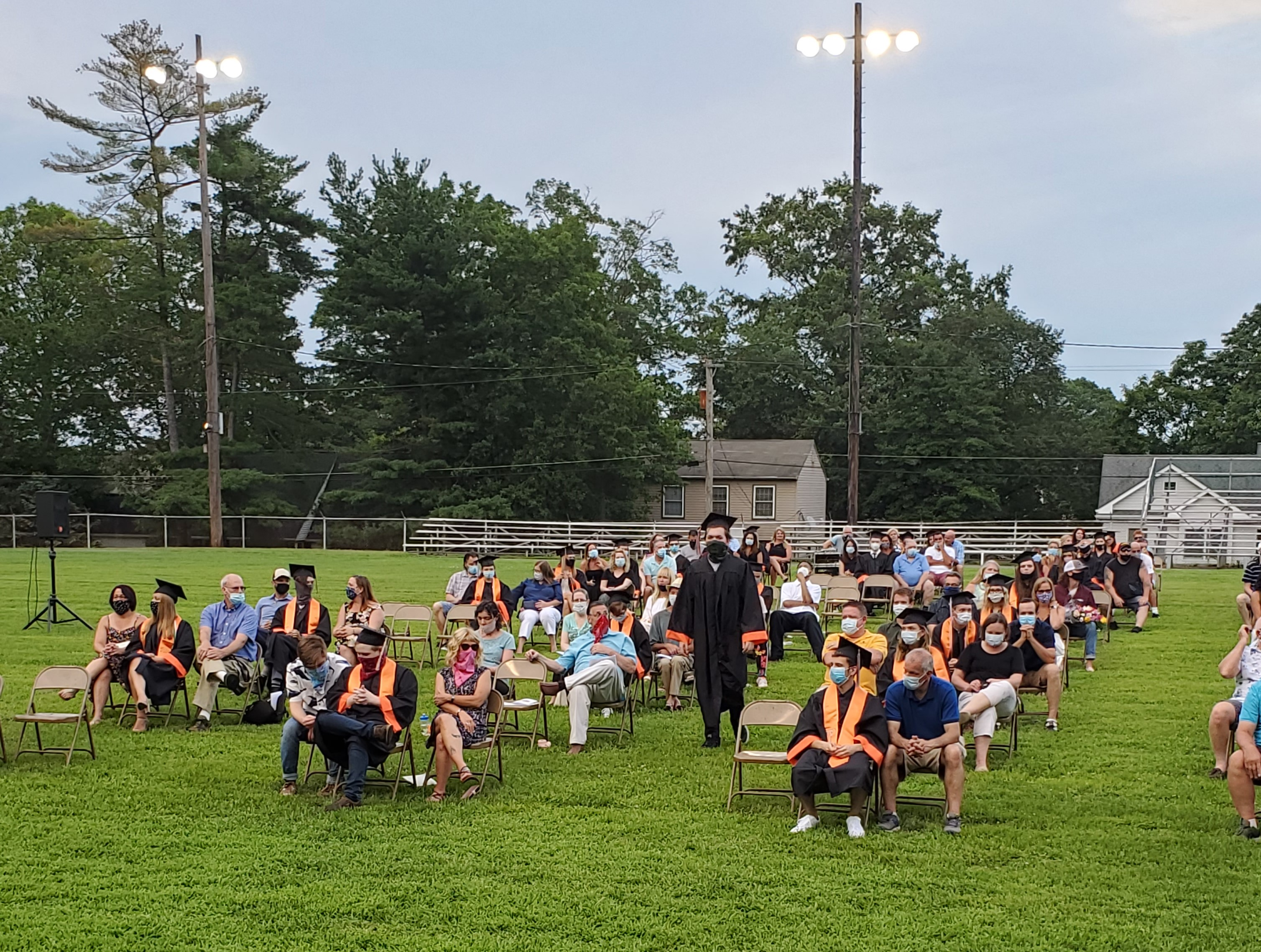
Members of the class of 2020 sit with their parents at a special graduation ceremony held during the COVID-19 pandemic

The school was the 198th-ranked public high school in New Jersey out of 339 schools statewide in New Jersey Monthly magazine's September 2014 cover story on the state's "Top Public High Schools", using a new ranking methodology. The school had been ranked 100th in the state of 328 schools in 2012, after being ranked 119th in 2010 out of 322 schools listed. The magazine ranked the school 102nd in 2008 out of 316 schools. The school was ranked 122nd in the magazine's September 2006 issue, which surveyed 316 schools across the state. Schooldigger.com ranked the school 157th out of 381 public high schools statewide in its 2011 rankings (a decrease of 45 positions from the 2010 ranking) which were based on the combined percentage of students classified as proficient or above proficient on the mathematics (82.6%) and language arts literacy (93.6%) components of the High School Proficiency Assessment (HSPA).

== Athletics ==
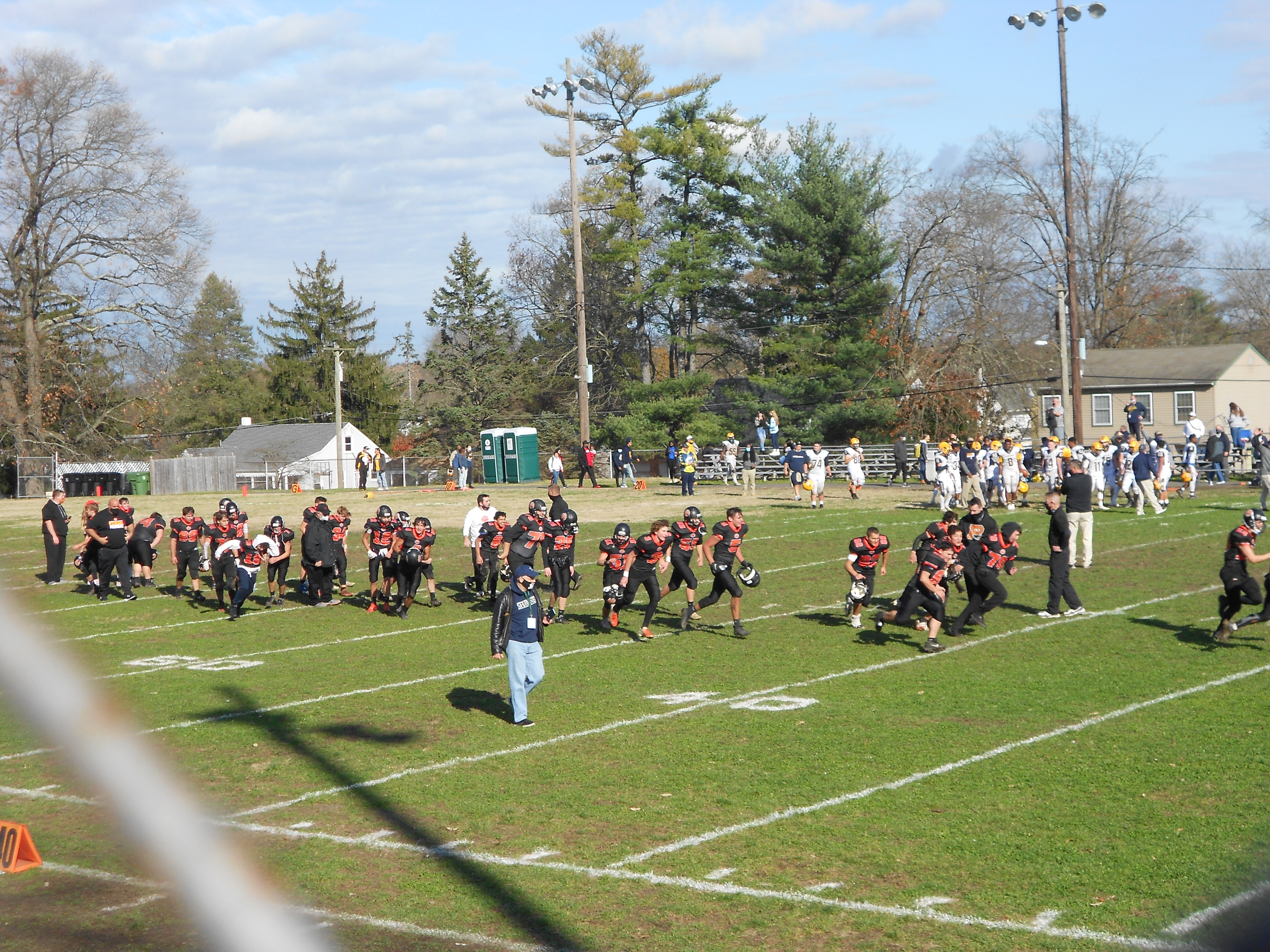
The Pitman Panthers run across Davis Field after defeating the Clayton Clippers at the 2020 Thanksgiving football game

The Pitman High School Panthers compete as one of the member schools in the Tri-County Conference, which is comprised of public and private high schools located in Camden, Cape May, Cumberland, Gloucester and Salem counties. The conference is overseen by the New Jersey State Interscholastic Athletic Association (NJSIAA). With 239 students in grades 10–12, the school was classified by the NJSIAA for the 2022–24 school years as Group I South for most athletic competition purposes. The football team competes in the Royal Division of the 94-team West Jersey Football League superconference and was classified by the NJSIAA as Group I South for football for 2024–2026, which included schools with 185 to 482 students.

The boys track team won the Group I spring / outdoor track state championship in 1942.

The field hockey team won the South II and overall state championship in 1974, defeating West Essex High School, won the South Jersey Group I state sectional championship in 1981-1983 and 2013, and won the Group I state title in 1981 (vs. Whippany Park High School), 1982 (vs. Belvidere High School) and 1983 (as co-champion with Chatham Township High School). The 1974 team defeated Collingswood High School in the semifinals before a 3–2 win against West Essex in the tournament final to earn the overall state title.

In 1989, 1993 and 1995, the girls' soccer team lost the Group II state tournament to Morris Catholic High School, the team that won the title for eight consecutive years from 1988 to 1995.

The boys' basketball team won the Group I state championship in 1997 (defeating runner-up Science Park High School in the finals of the tournament), 1998 (vs. Bloomfield Tech High School) and 2014 (vs. Bloomfield Tech). Led by 31 points from Joe Crispin and 24 from brother Jon, the 1997 team won the Group I title with a 73–67 win against Science High School of Newark in the championship game played at the Atlantic City Convention Hall. In 2014, the team won their third Group I title with a 59–48 win against Bloomfield Tech.

The girls tennis team won the South I state championship in 1971 and 1972, and won the Group I state title in 2006 (vs. Verona High School). The team won the South Jersey Group I state tournament in 1999, topping Pennsville Memorial High School 4–1 in the final match. The team repeated the title in 2000 with a 4–1 win against Haddon Township High School. The team won the 2006 South, Group I state sectional championship with a 4–1 victory over Point Pleasant Beach High School in the tournament final. The team won the 2006 Group II state title at Mercer County Park, topping Highland Park High School 5–0 in the semifinals and Verona High School by a score of 3–2 to take the championship.

The boys' soccer team won the 1999 and 2010 South Jersey Group I sectional titles with wins over Bordentown Regional High School, 2–1, and Maple Shade High School, 3–0, respectively.

In 2010, the girls' track and field team scored 40 points to tie Westwood for the Group I state championship. The team had won the 2010 Group I sectional title after they defeated Lindenwold High School by less than one point.

In 2010, the boys' baseball team won its first state title with a 5–0 win over Whippany Park in the state championship game. The team had won the South Jersey Group I state sectional title from 1963 to 1966.

The girls cross country running team won the Group I state championship in 2013.

== Marching band ==
The Pitman High School marching band competes in the 3 Open Class of the United States Scholastic Band Association (USSBA) and fluctuates from 60 to 70 members

The school's marching band was Chapter One Champions in 1999 (Group 1).

The Pitman Panther Marching band won the I class of Cavalcade of Bands in 2003.

The Pitman Panther Marching Band won the USSBA NJ state championships in 2006.

With their 2007 show, Spanish Fire, The PHS Marching Band won the 2007 USSBA Group 3A All States Championships in Allentown, PA on November 11, 2007. The win launched the band in to the Open Class of the division where the more seasoned and established programs compete, along with an invitation to the 2008 USSBA Championships in Annapolis, MD at the United States Naval Academy.

== Jazz ensemble ==
The jazz ensemble began competing in the NJAJE Competitions in the 2010 school year. In 2010 the band earned a Bronze Rating at Preliminary Finals and a Silver Rating in 2011.

In the Cavalcade of Bands circuit in 2010 the Trumpet section was awarded a best section award at Cavalcade of Bands Jazz Championships hosted at Souderton High School.

Competing in the NJ division of Cavalcade of Bands in 2011 the Pitman Jazz Ensemble received awards for Best Trumpet Section, Best Trombone Section, Soloist Award for T.J. Hayden, and was named the Independence Division Champions for the State of New Jersey. In the Cavalcade of Bands Finals for the season the band placed 3rd overall.

== KotoriCon ==
On January 6, 2012, the school hosted part of the anime convention KotoriCon, namely a concert by Johnny Yong Bosch (Adam Park in Mighty Morphin Power Rangers, among other parts) and his band Eyeshine. (The remainder of the convention was at Rowan College at Gloucester County.)

== Administration ==
The high school's principal is Kristen Stewart. Her core administration team includes two assistant principals.

== Notable alumni ==
- Hank Beebe (1926–2023), composer who was known for his choral compositions and Broadway musicals
- Madeline Brewer (born 1992, class of 2010), actress
- Joe Crispin (born 1979, class of 1997), Gloucester County's all-time leading scorer for boys' high school basketball (2,651 career points) who played in the NBA for the Los Angeles Lakers and Phoenix Suns
- Jon Crispin (born 1981, class of 1999), Gloucester County's fourth all-time leading boys' scorer (2,319 career points) in high school. Played collegiately for two seasons at Penn State with brother Joe, then transferred and spent last two seasons with the UCLA Bruins
- Jane Moffet (1930–2018), utility player who played for four seasons in the All-American Girls Professional Baseball League
- Erica Scanlon (Class of 2000), Miss New Jersey 2004
- John E. Wallace Jr. (born 1942, class of 1960), former Associate Justice of the New Jersey Supreme Court
