= Jane Moffet =

American baseball player (1930–2018)

- Utility
- Born: July 2, 1930; Pitman, New Jersey, U.S.
- Died: March 16, 2018 (age 87); Cape May Court House, New Jersey, U.S.
- Batted: Right Threw: Right
- Stats at Baseball Reference

Teams
- Springfield Sallies (1949–1950); Chicago Colleens (1950); Kalamazoo Lassies (1951–1952); Battle Creek Belles (1952)

Jane Moffet (July 2, 1930 – March 16, 2018) was an American utility player who played from 1949 through 1952 in the All-American Girls Professional Baseball League (AAGPBL). Listed at 5 ft 10 in (1.78 m), 151 pounds (68 kg), Moffett batted and threw right-handed.

She was born in Pitman, New Jersey and graduated from Pitman High School in 1948, where she competed in basketball and field hockey, but never played baseball.

Moffet was one of the 15 players born in New Jersey to join the All-American Girls Professional Baseball League in its 12-year history. She was among the most versatile players in the late years of the circuit, playing catcher, first base and the outfield. She made the league by mistake and ended up playing for four different teams in part of four seasons.

Moffet was allocated to the travelling Springfield Sallies and Chicago Colleens for two years to acquire more experience and better professional quality. In 1950, she played 21 games mostly as a catcher and hit .161 with 11 runs and nine RBI. She continued her college education, but joined the league at the end of each semester to play ball.

In 1951 Moffett was promoted to the Kalamazoo Lassies and she played in 94 of the 100 games of her team. Smooth at the plate, she was just as splendid in the field, turning in seemingly effortless catches between all three outfield spots. She finished her rookie season with a .205 average (64-for-312), including 11 doubles, one triple and 23 stolen bases, driving in 23 runs while scoring 35 times.

Moffet opened 1952 with Kalamazoo, but was dealt to the Battle Creek Belles during the midseason, as the league usually switched players as needed to help new teams to be competitive. She posted a combined .238 average in 56 games, while dividing her playing time at first base and the outfield.

At the end of four years, Moffet quit the league and remained in New Jersey because her mother was terminally ill. Then, she finished her master's degree at Rutgers University and worked in the education area for more than four decades. Eventually, she became a high school principal at Saddle Brook High School until her retirement in 1994.

Since 1988 Moffet is part of Women in Baseball, a permanent display based at the Baseball Hall of Fame and Museum in Cooperstown, New York, which was unveiled to honor the entire All-American Girls Professional Baseball League rather than individual baseball personalities.

Retired from a position as principal of Saddle Brook High School, Moffet lived in Rio Grande, New Jersey until the time of her death.

== Career statistics ==
Batting

GP	AB	R	H	2B	3B	HR	RBI	SB	BB	SO	BA	OBP
150	463	13	33	2	3	0	14	31	47	53	.210	.282

Collective fielding

GP	PO	A	E	TC	DP	FA
140	326	38	23	387	11	.939
