= Anthony Miller (basketball) =

American basketball player (born 1971)

Personal information
- Born: October 22, 1971 (age 55) Benton Harbor, Michigan, U.S.
- Listed height: 6 ft 9 in (2.06 m)
- Listed weight: 225 lb (102 kg)

Career information
- High school: Benton Harbor (Benton Harbor, Michigan)
- College: Michigan State (1991–1994)
- NBA draft: 1994: 2nd round, 39th overall pick
- Drafted by: Golden State Warriors
- Playing career: 1994–2010
- Position: Power forward
- Number: 2, 34, 9, 41

Career history
- 1994–1996: Los Angeles Lakers
- 1996: Florida Beachdogs
- 1996–1998: Atlanta Hawks
- 1999–2000: Houston Rockets
- 2000: Atlanta Hawks
- 2000: Houston Rockets
- 2001: Philadelphia 76ers
- 2002–2004: Yakima Sun Kings
- 2004: Atlanta Hawks
- 2007–2008: Shanghai Sharks

Career highlights
- 2× CBA champion (2003, 2006); CBA All-Star (2004); ABA All-Star (2005); Mr. Basketball of Michigan (1990)

Career NBA statistics
- Points: 510 (2.8 ppg)
- Rebounds: 488 (2.7 rpg)
- Assists: 66 (0.4 apg)
- Stats at NBA.com
- Stats at Basketball Reference

Anthony Miller (born October 22, 1971) is an American former professional basketball player who played parts of eight seasons in the National Basketball Association (NBA). He was selected by the Golden State Warriors in the second round (39th pick overall) of the 1994 NBA draft. He was born and raised in Benton Harbor, Michigan.

A 2.06 m (6 ft 9 in) forward from Michigan State University, Miller played in eight NBA seasons for the Los Angeles Lakers, Atlanta Hawks, Houston Rockets and Philadelphia 76ers. He has also been under contract with the Minnesota Timberwolves and Golden State Warriors. The last time Miller played in the NBA was during the 2004-05 season, appearing in 2 games for the Hawks.

In his NBA career, Miller played in 181 games and scored a total of 510 points.

Miller played in the Continental Basketball Association (CBA) for the Yakima Sun Kings and won CBA championships in 2003 and 2006. He signed with the American Basketball Association's Las Vegas Aces on August 27, 2008.

Miller appeared in the 1996 sports comedy movies Space Jam (along with then-coach Del Harris) and Eddie, both along with Laker teammates Cedric Ceballos and Vlade Divac.
