= John Aveni =

American football player (1935–2002)

No. 89
- Positions: Placekicker, tight end, defensive end

Personal information
- Born: March 17, 1935; Glassboro, New Jersey, U.S.
- Died: January 20, 2002 (aged 66); Philadelphia, Pennsylvania, U.S.
- Listed height: 6 ft 3 in (1.91 m)
- Listed weight: 212 lb (96 kg)

Career information
- High school: Glassboro
- College: Indiana
- NFL draft: 1959: 27th round, 321st overall pick

Career history
- Chicago Bears (1959–1960); New York Giants (1961)*; Washington Redskins (1961); Pottstown Firebirds (1969)
- * Offseason or practice squad member only

Career NFL statistics
- Field goal attempts/makes: 63/22
- Field goal %: 34.9
- Extra points: 72/80
- Receiving yards: 84
- Total touchdowns: 1
- Stats at Pro Football Reference

John Patrick Aveni (March 17, 1935 – January 20, 2002) was an American professional football placekicker and tight end in the National Football League (NFL) for the Chicago Bears and Washington Redskins.

== Early life ==
Aveni was born in Glassboro, New Jersey and attended Glassboro High School, where he played high school football at three different positions. He then was awarded a full scholarship and played college football at Indiana University in Bloomington, Indiana. He graduated in 1959 with a degree in business marketing.

== Professional career ==
Aveni was selected in the 27th round of the 1959 NFL draft by the Chicago Bears, where he played from 1959 to 1960. In June 1961, he was traded to the New York Giants for defensive back Lee Riley. However, in July 1961, before playing a down for the Giants, Aveni was involved in a three-team trade with the Giants, Dallas Cowboys and Washington Redskins. The Giants received ends Jim Podoley and Joe Walton from the Redskins, the Redskins received Fred Dugan from the Cowboys and Aveni, end Jerry Daniels, and defensive halfback Dave Whitsell from the Giants, and the Cowboys received placekicker Allen Green and a sixth round for the 1962 NFL draft from the Giants that the team later used to draft George Andrie.

== Coaching and teaching career ==
Aveni began as a health and physical education teacher at Glassboro High School in 1960 during the football off-season. Then, after retiring from professional football, he moved to Pitman, New Jersey and briefly worked as an insurance agent. He then returned to Glassboro High School in 1965 as a teacher in business, health and physical education and a coach for football, basketball and golf. Aveni became a student personnel adviser in 1971, then was named assistant principal in 1975 later, before becoming principal in 1985. In 1976, he led the Glassboro football team to the South Jersey Group 1 championship as a rookie head coach. In 1983, he led the Bulldogs (South Jersey's only undefeated, untied football squad that season) to another Group 1 title. Running back Gordon Lockbaum later became a Heisman Trophy candidate at College of the Holy Cross. After eight years as principal, Aveni became the director of special programs for the school district until he retired in 1997. He continued in education as an adjunct professor at Gloucester County College.

Aveni was elected to The Gloucester County, NJ Sports Hall of Fame in 1983.

== Personal life ==
Aveni married his wife, Margaret, in 1959 and raised three daughters. On January 20, 2002, he suffered a stroke and died at Temple University Hospital in Philadelphia, Pennsylvania.
