= Jarvis Lynch =

United States Marine Corps general

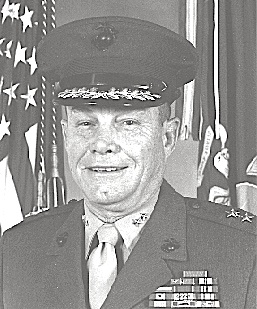
- MajGen Jarvis Lynch, USMC
- Born: February 17, 1933 (age 93); Glassboro, New Jersey, U.S.
- Military career
- Allegiance: United States of America
- Branch: United States Marine Corps
- Service years: 1956–1991
- Rank: Major general
- Commands: 2nd Force Service Support Group
- Conflicts: Vietnam War
- Awards: Distinguished Service Medal; Legion of Merit; Bronze Star

Jarvis D. Lynch Jr., USMC, (born February 17, 1933) is a Major General that served in the Vietnam War. He retired in 1991 when he was the commanding general of the Marine Corps Recruit Depot out of Parris Island, South Carolina.

== Early years ==
A native of Glassboro, New Jersey, Lynch graduated from Glassboro High School in 1951.

== Military career ==
He received his B.S. degree from the United States Naval Academy in June 1956, and was commissioned a second lieutenant in the Marine Corps. He also holds an M.S. degree in management technology from American University, conferred in 1973.

Upon completion of The Basic School, Quantico, Virginia, in March 1957, he was assigned to the 1st Battalion, 4th Marines in Hawaii. While there, he was promoted to first lieutenant in December 1957. Transferred to Los Angeles, California, in May 1959, he was assigned to the Officer Selection Team as the assistant officer selection officer until May 1962. He was promoted to captain in October 1961. Lynch transferred overseas in July 1962, where he served for a year as an assistant operations officer, 3rd Marine Division, on Okinawa. On his return to the states in August 1963, he served for two years as the senior tactics instructor and chief instructor of the 2d Infantry Training Regiment, Camp Pendleton, California. During July 1965, he returned to the United States Naval Academy as an instructor and company officer. While at Annapolis, he was promoted to major in October 1966.

From August 1967 until June 1968, he attended the Marine Corps Command and Staff College at Quantico, graduating as an honor graduate. He was transferred to South Vietnam for duty as the operations officer of 2nd Battalion, 26th Marines (also Battalion Landing Team 2/26) and later with Special Landing Force Alpha. Ordered to Headquarters Marine Corps, Washington, D.C., in August 1969, Lynch served as a plans officer in the Plans and Programs Branch, G-3 Division.

In January 1972, he returned to school and received his master's degree from American University in Washington, D.C. Following completion of school in July 1973, Lynch was promoted to lieutenant colonel. He was assigned duties as instructor and chief of Combat Service Support Instruction Division, Education Center, at the Marine Corps Combat Development and Education Command, Quantico. From April 1977 until June 1978, Lynch attended the Naval War College at Newport, Rhode Island, graduating with distinction. The following month, he returned to the Far East for duty as the operations officer of III Marine Amphibious Force, on Okinawa. During December of that year, he was promoted to colonel.

Lynch reported to New Orleans and assumed duty as the deputy director, 8th Marine Corps district, in August 1979. In June 1981, he became the 18th director of the 8th Marine Corps District in New Orleans. He served in this capacity until June 1983, when he reported to Headquarters, Fleet Marine Force, Pacific, Camp H. M. Smith, Hawaii, to assume the duties as chief of staff. While serving in this capacity, he was selected in February 1985 for promotion to brigadier general. He was advanced to that grade on June 18, 1985, and assigned as the assistant chief of staff for operations, Headquarters, Allied Forces, Northern European Command, near Oslo, Norway on July 15, 1985.

Lynch was assigned as the commanding general, 2nd Force Service Support Group (Rein), Camp Lejeune, North Carolina, on 18 September 1987. He was advanced to major general on 5 May 1988.

According to the book Making The Corps, Lynch favored tough realistic training in Marine boot camp. His philosophy was "I don't mind bloody or broken noses". He always signed his memos "no prisoners".

== Post-military life ==
In 1995, Lynch was named the U.S. Naval Institute's "Distinguished Author of the Year." A 1988 article, "Landmines, Lies and Other Phenomena", addressing the subject of the ongoing landmine controversy, appeared in the Naval Institute's Proceedings magazine.

== Awards ==
Lynch's decorations and medals include:

	Navy Distinguished Service Medal		
Legion of Merit	Bronze Star w/ 1 award star & valor device	Combat Action Ribbon	Navy Presidential Unit Citation
Navy Unit Commendation	Navy Meritorious Unit Commendation	National Defense Service Medal w/ 1 service star	Vietnam Service Medal w/ 4 service stars
Navy & Marine Corps Overseas Service Ribbon	Vietnam Gallantry Cross w/ gold star	Vietnam Gallantry Cross unit citation	Vietnam Campaign Medal
