= Juwan Johnson =

American football player (born 1996)

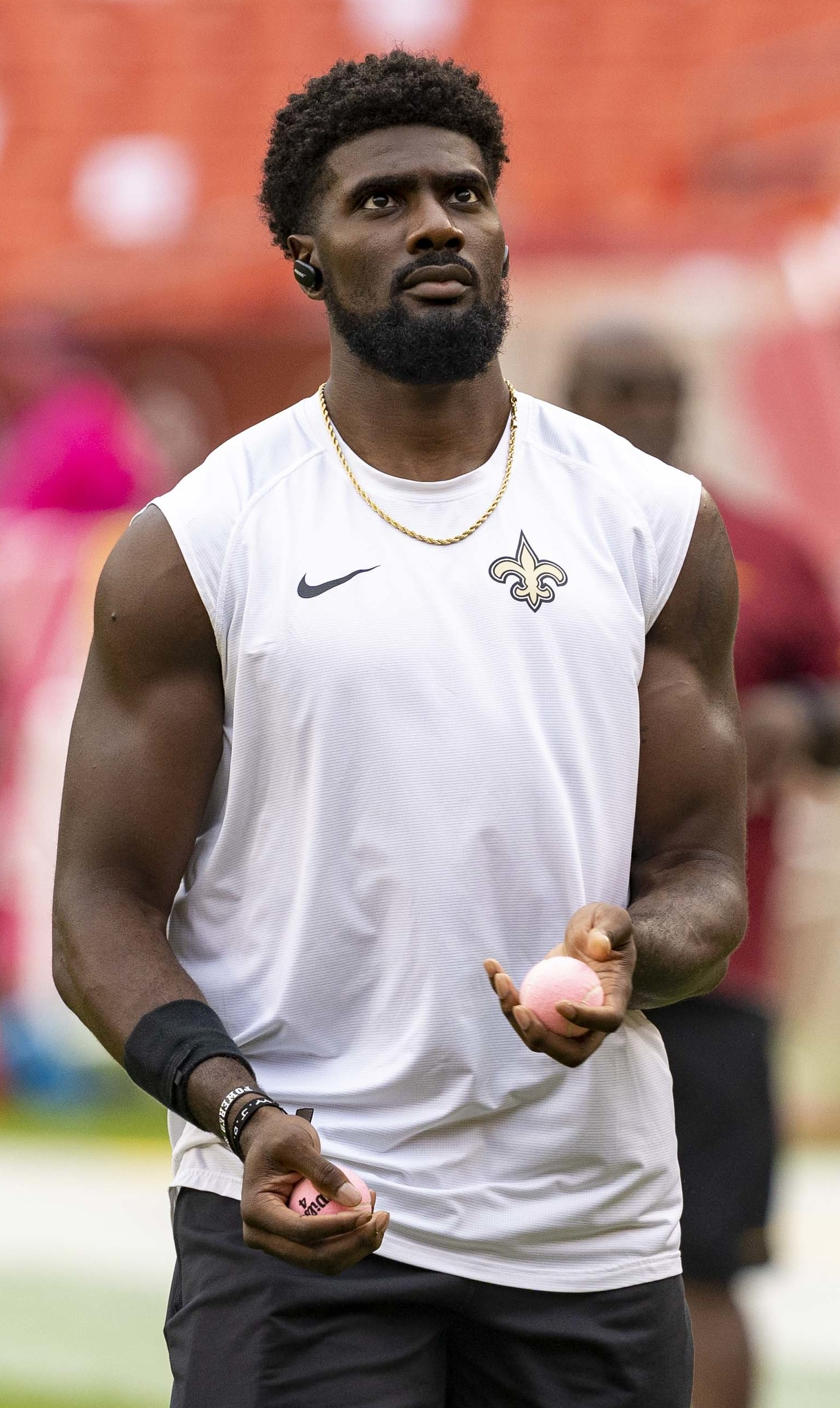
- Johnson in 2021

No. 83 – New Orleans Saints
- Position: Tight end
- Roster status: Active

Personal information
- Born: September 13, 1996 (age 30); Stratford, New Jersey, U.S.
- Listed height: 6 ft 4 in (1.93 m)
- Listed weight: 231 lb (105 kg)

Career information
- High school: Glassboro (Glassboro, New Jersey)
- College: Penn State (2015–2018); Oregon (2019)
- NFL draft: 2020: undrafted

Career history
- New Orleans Saints (2020–present)

Career NFL statistics as of Week 3, 2026
- Receptions: 238
- Receiving yards: 2,684
- Receiving touchdowns: 24
- Stats at Pro Football Reference

Juwan Johnson (born September 13, 1996) is an American professional football tight end for the New Orleans Saints of the National Football League (NFL). He played college football for the Penn State Nittany Lions and Oregon Ducks and signed with the Saints as an undrafted free agent in 2020.

== Early life ==
Born in Stratford, New Jersey, Johnson was raised in Glassboro, New Jersey and played prep football at Glassboro High School.

== College career ==
Johnson played college football as a Wide Receiver at Penn State from 2015 to 2018 before transferring to Oregon for his senior year.

== Professional career ==
Pre-draft measurables
Height	Weight	Arm length	Hand span	Wingspan	40-yard dash	10-yard split	20-yard split	20-yard shuttle	Three-cone drill	Vertical jump	Broad jump	Bench press
6 ft 4 in (1.93 m)	230 lb (104 kg)	34 1/4 in (0.87 m)	10 1/2 in (0.27 m)	6 ft 9 5/8 in (2.07 m)	4.58 s	1.54 s	2.68 s	4.27 s	6.94 s	33.0 in (0.84 m)	10 ft 4 in (3.15 m)	14 reps
All values from NFL Combine/Pro Day

Johnson signed with the New Orleans Saints as an undrafted free agent following the 2020 NFL draft on April 27, 2020. He was waived during final roster cuts on September 5, 2020, and signed to the team's practice squad the next day. He was elevated to the active roster on October 24, October 31, December 5, and December 12 for the team's weeks 7, 8, 13, and 14 games against the Carolina Panthers, Chicago Bears, Atlanta Falcons, and Philadelphia Eagles, and reverted to the practice squad after each game. He was signed to the active roster on December 19.

Johnson played in 14 games (starting 2) for New Orleans in 2021, accumulating 159 yards and 4 touchdowns on 13 receptions. In 2022, Johnson played in 16 games for the Saints, hauling in 42 receptions for 508 yards and a career–high (and team–high) 7 touchdowns.

On March 11, 2023, Johnson signed a two-year contract extension with the Saints. He played in 13 games (starting 11) for the Saints in 2023, recording 37 receptions for 368 yards and 4 touchdowns.

On June 13, 2024, it was announced that Johnson would undergo foot surgery, causing him to be questionable for the start of the regular season.

On March 12, 2025, Johnson signed a three-year, $30.75 million contract extension with the Saints.

== NFL career statistics ==
Legend
**Bold**	Career high

=== Regular season ===
Year	Team	Games		Receiving					Fumbles	
Year	Team	GP	GS	Rec	Yds	Avg	Lng	TD	Fum	Lost
2020	NO	7	4	4	39	9.8	19	0	0	0
2021	NO	14	2	13	159	**12.2**	27	4	0	0
2022	NO	16	**12**	42	508	12.1	41	**7**	0	0
2023	NO	13	11	37	368	9.9	32	4	0	0
2024	NO	**17**	5	50	548	11.0	30	3	**2**	0
2025	NO	**17**	10	**77**	**889**	11.5	**52**	3	**2**	**2**
2026	NO	5	5	25	248	9.9	27	3	1	1
Total		89	49	248	2,759	10.9	52	24	5	3

== Personal life ==
Johnson is a Christian. He is married to Chanen Johnson. They have two daughters.
