= Glassboro Public Schools =

School district in Gloucester County, New Jersey, US

Address
- 560 Joseph Bowe Boulevard Glassboro, Gloucester County, New Jersey, 08028; United States
- Coordinates: 39.704599°N 75.116935°W

District information
- Grades: PreK to 12
- Superintendent: Mark J. Silverstein
- Business administrator: Michael Sloan
- Schools: 4

Students and staff
- Enrollment: 1,895 (as of 2022–23)
- Faculty: 155.7 FTEs
- Student–teacher ratio: 12.2:1

Other information
- District Factor Group: B
- Website: www.gpsd.us
Ind.	Per pupil	District spending	Rank (*)	K-12 average	%± vs. average
1A	Total Spending	$18,832	50	$18,891	−0.3%
1	Budgetary Cost	13,748	35	14,783	−7.0%
2	Classroom Instruction	8,119	34	8,763	−7.3%
6	Support Services	1,925	22	2,392	−19.5%
8	Administrative Cost	1,700	52	1,485	14.5%
10	Operations & Maintenance	1,586	32	1,783	−11.0%
13	Extracurricular Activities	224	6	268	−16.4%
16	Median Teacher Salary	65,734	46	64,043
Data from NJDoE 2014 Taxpayers' Guide to Education Spending. *Of K-12 districts with 1,800-3,500 students. Lowest spending=1; Highest=68

The Glassboro Public Schools is a comprehensive community public school district that serves students in pre-kindergarten through twelfth grade from Glassboro, in Gloucester County, in the U.S. state of New Jersey.

As of the 2022–23 school year, the district, comprising four schools, had an enrollment of 1,895 students and 155.7 classroom teachers (on an FTE basis), for a student–teacher ratio of 12.2:1.

The district participates in the Interdistrict Public School Choice Program, which allows non-resident students to attend school in the district at no cost to their parents, with tuition covered by the resident district. Available slots are announced annually by grade.

== History ==
Glassboro High School was established in 1913 at the corner of High Street and Lake Street. With increased enrollment, a new facility located on Delsea Drive was constructed at a cost of $400,000 (equivalent to $7.7 million in 2025) and dedicated in May 1930. In 1965, the school moved to a new building costing $2.275 million (equivalent to $23.9 million in 2025) at 550 Joseph L. Bowe Boulevard, across from Rowan University, where it has been located since.

Students from Elk Township had attended Glassboro High School as part as part of a sending/receiving relationship with the Elk Township School District until Delsea Regional High School opened for the 1960–61 school year. On June 19, 1986, President Ronald Reagan became the first sitting president to speak at a high school graduation when he spoke at the Glassboro High School commencement ceremonies.

With student enrollment dropping by 13% over the previous five years, the district sold Glassboro Intermediate School, which had served grades seven and eight, to Rowan University in 2021. The sale netted the district $3.4 million and an annual reduction of $175,000 in maintenance costs. 7th and 8th-grade students who had previously been served at the school were shifted to Thomas E. Bowe Elementary School, which had previously served fourth to sixth grades.

The district had been classified by the New Jersey Department of Education as being in District Factor Group "B", the second lowest of eight groupings. District Factor Groups organize districts statewide to allow comparison by common socioeconomic characteristics of the local districts. From lowest socioeconomic status to highest, the categories are A, B, CD, DE, FG, GH, I and J.

== Schools ==
Schools in the district (with 2022–23 enrollment data from the National Center for Education Statistics) are:

Elementary schools

- J. Harvey Rodgers School with 265 students in grades PreK and kindergarten
  - Melanie Sweeney, principal
- Dorothy L. Bullock School with 651 students in grades 1-5
  - Kelly Marchese, principal

Middle school

- Thomas E. Bowe Middle School with 432 students in grades 6-8
  - Lauren Kerr, principal

High school

- Glassboro High School with 518 students in grades 9-12
  - Monique Stowman-Burke, principal

== Administration ==
Core members of the district's administration are:

- Mark J. Silverstein, superintendent
- Michael Sloan, business administrator and board secretary

== Board of education ==
The district's board of education, composed of nine members, sets policy and oversees the fiscal and educational operation of the district through its administration. As a Type II school district, the board's trustees are elected directly by voters to serve three-year terms of office on a staggered basis, with three seats up for election each year held (since 2012) as part of the November general election. The board appoints a superintendent to oversee the district's day-to-day operations and a business administrator to supervise the business functions of the district.
