= Gordie Lockbaum =

American football player (born 1965)

No. 17
- Positions: Running back, safety

Personal information
- Born: November 16, 1965 (age 60); Media, Pennsylvania, U.S.
- Listed height: 5 ft 11 in (1.80 m)
- Listed weight: 195 lb (88 kg)

Career information
- High school: Glassboro (Glassboro, New Jersey)
- College: Holy Cross (1984–1988)
- NFL draft: 1988: 9th round, 236th overall pick

Career history
- Pittsburgh Steelers (1988)*; Buffalo Bills (1989)*; Massachusetts Marauders (1994)
- * Offseason or practice squad member only

Awards and highlights
- First-team All-American (1986); Nils V. "Swede" Nelson Award (1987)
- Stats at ArenaFan.com
- College Football Hall of Fame

Gordon Carl Lockbaum (born November 16, 1965) is an American former college football player, who was a standout two-way player (playing both offense and defense) in NCAA Division I-AA.

== College career ==
Lockbaum was raised in Glassboro, New Jersey, and spent his prep years at Glassboro High School where he competed in football, baseball, and wrestling; he graduated in 1984. Lockbaum attended the College of the Holy Cross in Worcester, Massachusetts, from 1984 to 1988, where he played wide receiver and halfback on offense, defensive back on defense, and was a kick returner on special teams.

Lockbaum was a starting cornerback during his freshman season, and moved to strong safety as a sophomore. Before his junior season, the Holy Cross coaching staff (head coach Mark Duffner, offensive coordinate Tom Rossley, and defensive coordinator Kevin Coyle) decided to use Lockbaum on both offense and defense. He became the first two-way player since Leroy Keyes of Purdue in 1968.

In Lockbaum's junior season of 1986, he rushed for 827 yards on 144 carries, caught 57 passes for 860 yards, and scored 22 touchdowns on offense; on defense he had 46 tackles, two fumble recoveries, and one interception; on special teams he returned 21 kickoffs for 452 yards. In a game against Dartmouth he scored six touchdowns, and in a game against Army he was on the field for 143 of 171 total plays. He was named WTBS college football player of the year, New Jersey Sports Writers Association college player of the year, and finished fifth in the Heisman Trophy balloting.

In his senior season of 1987, he rushed for 403 yards on 85 carries, and caught 77 passes for 1152 yards, amassing 2041 all-purpose yards and again scoring 22 touchdowns, while continuing to play defense and special teams. He finished third in the Heisman Trophy balloting, second in the Maxwell Award voting, and was runner-up for the inaugural Walter Payton Award (Division I-AA player of the year). After the conclusion of the regular season, Lockbaum was selected for three all-star games; the Senior Bowl, the East–West Shrine Game, and the Blue–Gray Football Classic. He appeared in all three games, seeing the most action in the Shrine Game, where he played five positions (cornerback, free safety, strong safety, fullback, and wide receiver).

Lockbaum was a two-time First Team All-America selection (1986 and 1987) as a defensive back. He still holds several Holy Cross offensive records, including most touchdowns in a season and most points in a season (22 and 132, respectively, accomplished in both 1986 and 1987). Lockbaum was inducted into the Glassboro High School Hall of Fame in 1989, the Holy Cross Varsity Club Hall of Fame in 1993, the College Football Hall of Fame in 2001, and the ECAC Hall of Fame in 2017.

== Professional career ==
Lockbaum was selected in the 1988 NFL draft by the Pittsburgh Steelers in the ninth round, and played for them during the preseason as a running back, but was released by the team in August of that year. In 1989, he was signed by the Buffalo Bills, who moved him to safety, but he was again released before the start of the regular season. In 1994, he played briefly for the Massachusetts Marauders of the Arena Football League.

== Personal life ==
Lockbaum received a degree in economics from Holy Cross, and became an executive for an insurance company. His son, also nicknamed Gordie, played shortstop in the 2002 Little League World Series for the Worcester team that reached the US championship game, and later attended Amherst College where he was a defensive back on the football team.
