= Glassboro High School =

High school in Gloucester County, New Jersey, US

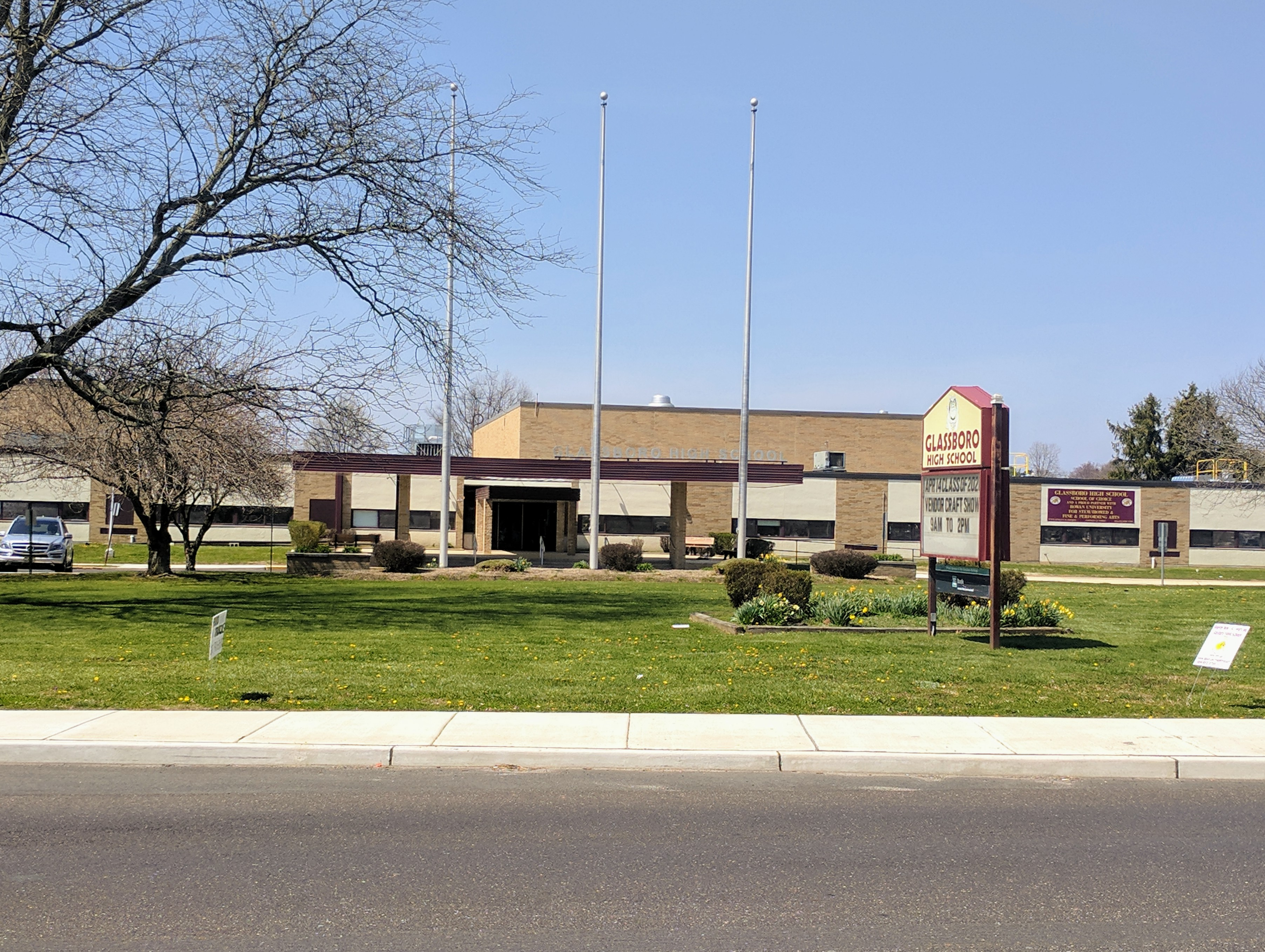
- Glassboro High School in April 2018

Location
- 550 Joseph L. Bowe Boulevard; Glassboro, Gloucester County, New Jersey 08028; United States; 39.715102°N 75.122005°W

Information
- Type: Public high school
- Established: 1913
- NCES School ID: 340588002558
- Principal: Monique Stowman-Burke
- Faculty: 50.6 FTEs
- Enrollment: 561 (as of 2024–25)
- Student to teacher ratio: 11.1:1
- Colors: Maroon and gold
- Athletics conference: Tri-County Conference (general); West Jersey Football League (football)
- Team name: Bulldogs
- Rivals: Paulsboro High School; Penns Grove High School
- Website: www.gpsd.us/o/ghs

Glassboro High School is a comprehensive community public high school that serves students in ninth through twelfth grades from Glassboro, in Gloucester County, in the U.S. state of New Jersey. It is the sole secondary school of the Glassboro Public Schools.

As of the 2024–25 school year, the school had an enrollment of 561 students and 50.6 classroom teachers (on an FTE basis), for a student–teacher ratio of 11.1:1. There were 231 students (41.2% of enrollment) eligible for free lunch and 13 (2.3% of students) eligible for reduced-cost lunch.

== History ==
The school was originally established in 1913 at the corner of High Street and Lake Street. With increased enrollment, a new facility located on Delsea Drive was constructed at a cost of $400,000 (equivalent to $7.7 million in 2025) and dedicated in May 1930. In 1965, the school moved to a new building costing $2.275 million (equivalent to $23.9 million in 2025) at 550 Joseph L. Bowe Boulevard, across from Rowan University, where it has been located since.

Students from Elk Township had attended Glassboro High School as part as part of a sending/receiving relationship with the Elk Township School District until Delsea Regional High School opened for the 1960–61 school year.

On June 19, 1986, President Ronald Reagan became the first sitting president to speak at a high school graduation when he spoke at the Glassboro High School commencement ceremonies.

== Awards, recognition and rankings ==
The school was the 221st-ranked public high school in New Jersey out of 339 schools statewide in New Jersey Monthly magazine's September 2014 cover story on the state's "Top Public High Schools", using a new ranking methodology. The school had been ranked 231st in the state of 328 schools in 2012, after being ranked 188th in 2010 out of 322 schools listed. The magazine ranked the school 197th in 2008 out of 316 schools. The school was ranked 242nd in the magazine's September 2006 issue, which surveyed 316 schools across the state.

== Athletics ==
The Glassboro High School Bulldogs compete as one of the member schools in the Tri-County Conference, which is comprised of public and private high schools located in Camden, Cape May, Cumberland, Gloucester and Salem counties. The conference is overseen by the New Jersey State Interscholastic Athletic Association (NJSIAA). With 386 students in grades 10–12, the school was classified by the NJSIAA for the 2022–24 school years as Group I South for most athletic competition purposes. The football team competes in the Patriot Division of the 94-team West Jersey Football League superconference and was classified by the NJSIAA as Group I South for football for 2024–2026, which included schools with 185 to 482 students.

The school participates as the host school / lead agency for joint cooperative boys / girls swimming and boys / girls tennis teams with Clayton High School, while Clayton is the host school for a co-op wrestling team. These co-op programs operate under agreements scheduled to expire at the end of the 2023–24 school year.

The boys track team won the Group I spring / outdoor track state championship in 1967 and 2009.

The baseball team won the South Jersey Group I state sectional title in 1970.

The field hockey team won the South II sectional title and the overall state championship in 1972 and won the Group I state title in 1975, defeating West Morris Mendham High School in the tournament final. The 1972 team finished the season with an 18–0 record, winning the South Jersey II section title with a 1–0 win against Cherry Hill High School West and taking the state championship with a 7–0 win against a West Essex High School team that came into the finals with a 55-game winning streak. Tied at the half, the 1975 team pulled ahead of Mendham in the second half to win the Group I state title by a score of 4-1 and finish the season with a record of 14–1–2. In 2007, the field hockey team won the South Jersey, Group I state sectional championship with a 3–2 win over St. Joseph High School in the tournament final.

The football team won the South Jersey Group I state sectional championships in 1974 (declared as champion), 1975, 1981, 1983, 1987, 1999, 2007, 2008, 2010, 2011 and 2013. The 1981 team finished the season with a 9–2 record after winning the South Jersey Group I state sectional title by defeating Bordentown Regional High School by a score of 28–7 in the championship game. A home-field crowd of 4,000 watched the 1983 team finish the season with an 11–0 record after winning the South Jersey Group I sectional championship game with a 16–8 victory against Audubon High School. With a crowd of 3,500 in attendance, the 1987 team won the South Jersey Group I sectional title with an 8–0 victory over Paulsboro High School, capping off a 10-0-1 season. In 2007, the team won the sectional title with a 24–7 win over rival Paulsboro. A 28–8 win over Penns Grove High School in the 2008 sectional championship game was part of a season in which the team finished with a 12–0 record. The 2010 team won the sectional title with a 36–0 win over Paulsboro in the playoff finals to finish the season with a 10–2 record. The team won the South Jersey Group I title in 2011 with a 41–13 win in the championship game against Pennsville Memorial High School, finishing the season with a 10–2 record in a season where the two losses included a 55–35 loss to Pennsville. In 2013, the team won its tenth playoff-era sectional title and finished with a 7–5 record after a 44–0 win against Penns Grove in the championship game. In 2024, the Bulldogs won their first ever state championship in football, defeating Cedar Grove High School by a score of 56–14 in the NJSIAA Group I title game.

The boys' basketball team won the Group I state championship in 1978 (defeating Newark Tech High School in the tournament final), in 1991 (vs. Verona High School) and in 1994 (vs. Cresskill High School). The 1994 team won the Group I title with a 72–59 win against Cresskill in the championship game.

Sam Laspata won the 1988 state championship at 140 lbs., becoming the school's only state wrestling champion, in a season in which he won all 34 of his matches. He is a member of the Glassboro High School Sports Hall of Fame and was inducted in 2006 to the Gloucester County Hall of Fame.

The boys' track team won the Group I indoor state championship in 2009. The team won the Group I indoor relay state championship that same year

The boys' soccer team won the Group I state championship in 2018, defeating runner-up New Providence High School on penalty kicks in overtime in the tournament finals.

The 2025 boys' cross country team won the Group I state championship.

== Marching band ==
The school's marching band was Tournament of Bands Chapter One Champions in 1982.

== Mock trial ==
Glassboro High School's mock trial team has had success in the New Jersey's Vincent J. Apruzzese Mock Trial Competition, winning the Gloucester County regional competition in 2016, 2017, 2020, 2022, and 2023. The team won the South Jersey regional competition and finished third in the state for the 2016–2017 season.

== Administration ==
The principal is Monique Stowman-Burke. Her administration team includes the two assistant principal.

== Notable alumni ==
- John Aveni (1935–2002), placekicker and tight end in the National Football League for the Chicago Bears and the Washington Redskins
- Gary Brackett (born 1980, class of 1998), NFL linebacker of the Super Bowl XLI champion Indianapolis Colts
- James B. Carey (1911–1973), labor union leader who served as president of the United Electrical Workers from 1936 to 1941
- Mary Carnell (1861–1925), photographer
- Corey Clement (born 1994, class of 2012), NFL running back of the Super Bowl LII champion Philadelphia Eagles who set a South Jersey record with 6,245 rushing yards
- Sean F. Dalton (born 1962), Prosecutor of Gloucester County, New Jersey who previously served two terms in the New Jersey General Assembly, where he represented the 4th Legislative District
- George Johnson (born 1987, class of 2006), former NFL defensive end for the Tampa Bay Buccaneers, Detroit Lions, Minnesota Vikings and New Orleans Saints
- Juwan Johnson (born 1996), American football wide receiver/tight end for the New Orleans Saints of the National Football League
- Gordie Lockbaum (born 1965, class of 1984), attended Holy Cross College and twice finished in the top five in the Heisman Trophy balloting
- Jarvis Lynch (born 1933, class of 1951), retired major general in the United States Marine Corps
- Keon Sabb (born 2002), American football safety for the Alabama Crimson Tide football team
