= Monroe Township Bikepath =

Harrison G. Shaw Sr. Bike Trail
- Length: 6.36 mi (10.24 km)
- Location: Gloucester County, New Jersey, U.S.
- Trailheads: Williamstown; Downer; Glassboro
- Use: Hiking, cycling
- Difficulty: Easy
- Season: Year round
- Surface: Asphalt, gravel
- Right of way: Pennsylvania-Reading Seashore Lines

The Harrison G. Shaw Sr. Bike Trail is a multi-use trail in New Jersey with a total length of 6.36 miles (10.24 km). The trail runs along a section of the former right-of-way for the Pennsylvania-Reading Seashore Lines railroad. The bike path gets its name from long-time Glassboro resident Harrison Shaw. Harrison served in the US Army Infantry during WWII and saw combat in France with Gen. Patton's 3rd Army, 26th Infantry Div., 104th Regiment. He was captured in Nov. 1944, held until freed by Russian troops in May 1945 and discharged later that year. He was awarded 2 Bronze Stars for his service to his country.

== Trail heads ==
- Route 47 (Delsea Drive) near Grove Street Glassboro. Note that there is no public parking area at this trail head.
- County Road 633 (Blue Bell Road) near Virginia Avenue in Monroe.
