= Mary Carnell =

American photographer (1861–1925)

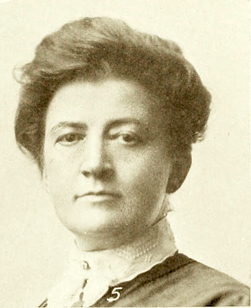
Mary Carnell, from a 1912 publication.

Mary Carnell (December 21, 1861 — October 10, 1925) also seen as Mary Carnell MacEuen, was an American photographer and clubwoman based in Philadelphia, Pennsylvania. She was founder and first president of the Women's Federation of the Photographers' Association of America.

== Early life ==
Mary A. Carnell was born in Glassboro, New Jersey, the daughter of William Carnell and Hannah Elmira Gillman Carnell. She graduated from Glassboro High School. Her father owned an iron foundry. She nearly died in 1890, when her uncle tried to push her into the path of an oncoming train, but she was rescued by the train's conductor.

== Career ==
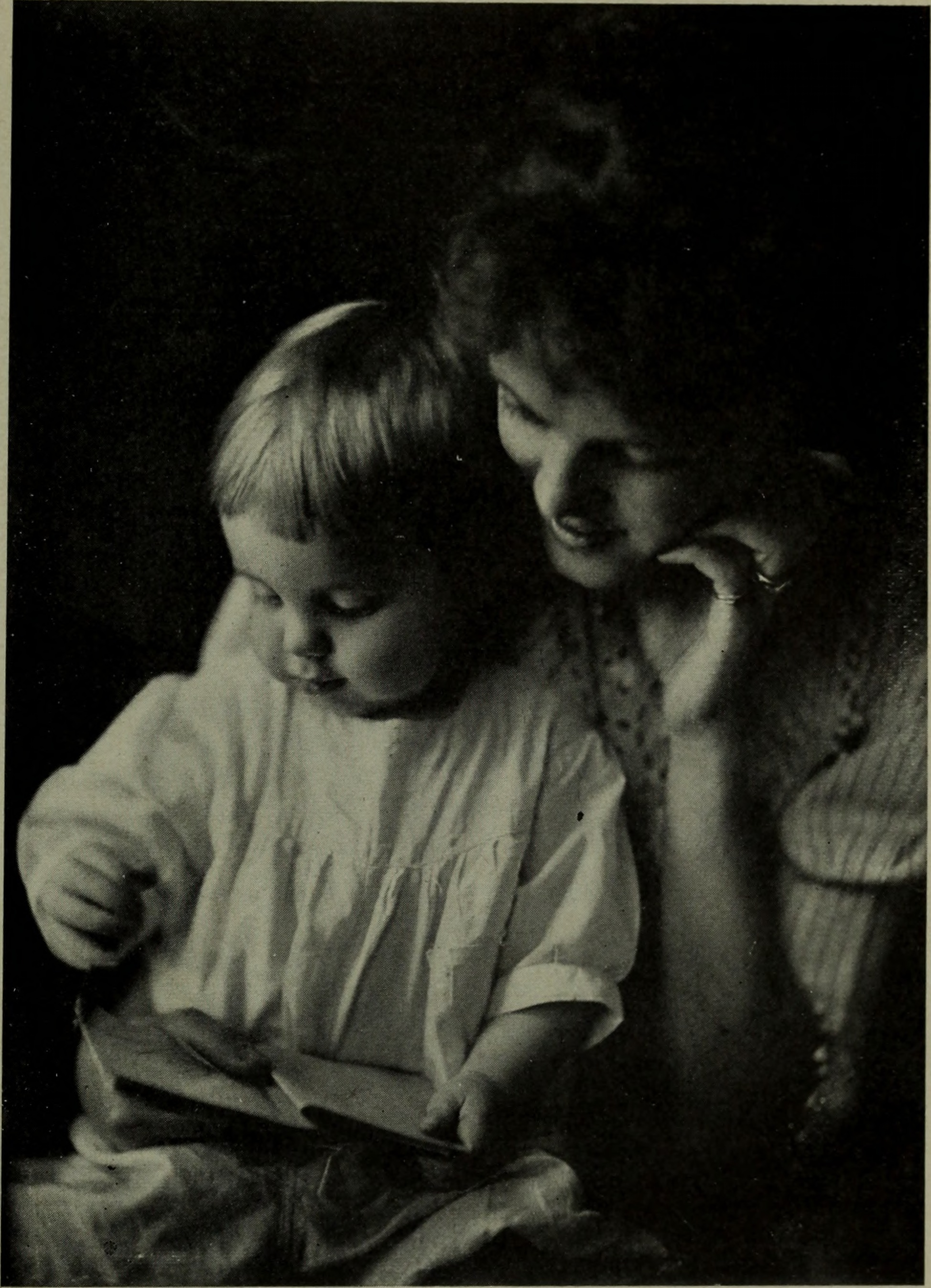
"The Story Book" by Mary Carnell, from a 1911 publication.

Carnell ran her own photographic studio from a home on Spruce Street in Philadelphia. She organized the Women's Federation of the Photographers' Association of America in 1909, and served as its first president for three years. "Her tact and executive ability is apparent in every movement of her stately figure," wrote Bayard Wootten in 1912. "She is the mother of the Federation, and in grateful appreciation of all she has done for the Federation she was voted its head for life."

Carnell was also president of the Ladies' Auxiliary of the Old Guard State Fencibles, member of the Historical Pageant Association of Pennsylvania, president of the Professional Women's Club, member of the Society for the Prevention of Social and Moral Diseases, member of the Dickens Fellowship, and on the board of directors of The Plastic Club.

== Personal life ==
Mary Carnell married Edward Allen MacEuen in 1900. She died in 1925, aged 63 years. Laura H. Carnell, dean of women at Temple University, was her cousin.
