= Glassboro Summit Conference =

1967 meeting between U.S. President Lyndon B. Johnson and Soviet Premier Alexei Kosygin

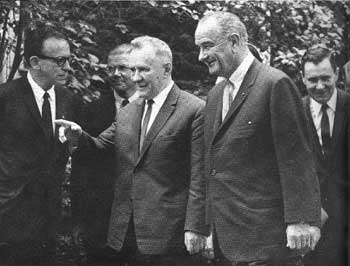
- Premier Alexei Kosygin and President Lyndon B. Johnson during the meeting in Glassboro.
- Host country: United States
- Date: 23–25 June 1967
- Cities: Glassboro, New Jersey
- Venues: Whitney Mansion
- Participants: (Soviet Union) Alexei Kosygin (United States) Lyndon B. Johnson
- Follows: Vienna summit (1961)
- Precedes: Moscow Summit (1972)

The Glassboro Summit Conference, usually just called the Glassboro Summit, was the 23–25 June 1967 meeting of the heads of government of the United States and the Soviet Union—President Lyndon B. Johnson and Premier Alexei Kosygin, respectively—for the purpose of discussing Soviet Union–United States relations in Glassboro, New Jersey, US. During the Arab–Israeli Six-Day War, diplomatic contact and cooperation increased, leading some to hope for an improvement in the two countries' relations. Some even hoped for joint cooperation on the Vietnam War. Although Johnson and Kosygin failed to reach agreement on anything important, the generally amicable atmosphere of the summit was referred to as the "Spirit of Glassboro" and is seen to have improved Soviet–US relations.

== Background ==
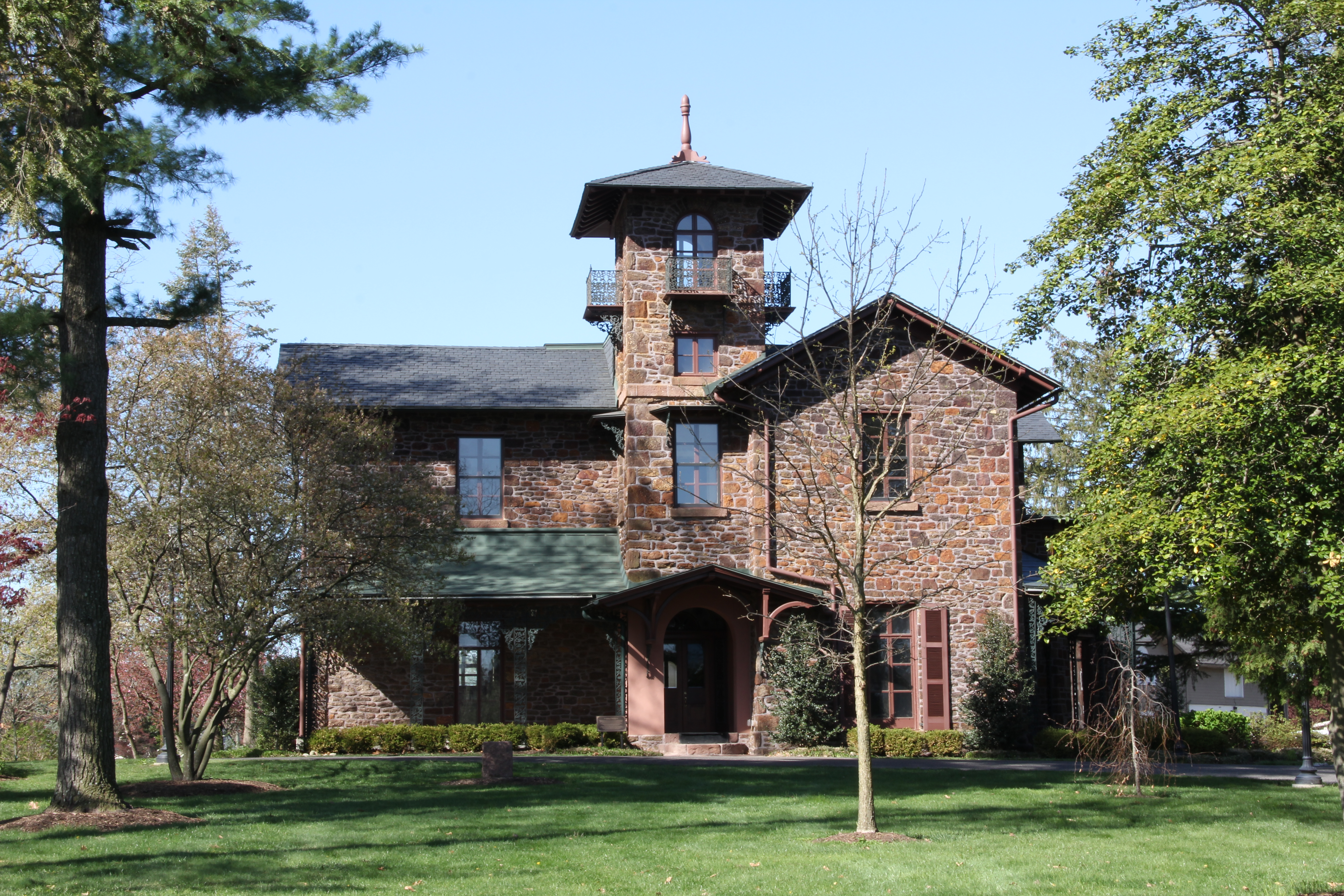
Hollybush Mansion at then Glassboro State College, site of the summit meetings.

With the United States gradually losing ground in the Vietnam War, the administration was looking for other solutions to the conflict.

On 5 June 1967, the Six-Day War began between Israel and the Arab states. The war led to an increase in Soviet-US diplomatic contact and cooperation; there were some who hoped this could continue to help the US solve the Vietnam War and other pressing international issues. On 10 June 1967, Premier Alexei Kosygin wrote a letter to contact President Lyndon B. Johnson. The "hot line" message arrived at the White House to seek communication between the United States and the Soviet Union. Alexei Kosygin gives a quick explanation of what the Soviet Union and United States should do in regards to the Middle Eastern Crisis. In the message Alexei Kosygin writes:

To The White House

To President Lyndon B. Johnson

Dear Mr. President:

The events of the last days have forced me to express to you with all frankness our view. As the situation shows, the resolutions of the Security Council are invalid. Israel has completely ignored them. As you can understand, after the many attempts taken in this direction and the resolutions of the Security Council concerning the termination of aggression on the part of Israel in the Near East - - these attempts have proved ineffective.

A very crucial moment has now arrived which forces us, if military actions are not stopped in the next few hours, to adopt an independent decision. We are ready to do this. However, these actions may bring us into a clash, which will lead to a grave catastrophe. Obviously in the world there are powers to whom this would be advantageous.

We purpose that you demand from Israel that it unconditionally cease military action in the next few hours. On our part, we will do the same. We purpose to warn Israel that, if this is not fulfilled, necessary actions will be taken, including military.

Please give me your views.

A. Kosygin

Several days later, the Soviet Union sent Premier Alexei Kosygin to New York City to deliver a speech on the then-ongoing Middle Eastern crisis at the United Nations headquarters. When the United States government was informed of this, the Americans gladly welcomed Kosygin to a meeting between him and President Lyndon B. Johnson. On 13 June 1967, Johnson sought out J. William Fulbright, a Senator, at a White House reception. Llewellyn Thompson, then US ambassador to the USSR, believed that a conference could "start the process of moving toward an understanding with the Soviets". Fulbright even believed that Johnson was reconsidering his Vietnam strategy. Later, Fulbright wrote two letters to Johnson about the importance of a summit between the two nations. Johnson agreed, and wrote a letter in return, which said they were waiting for a Soviet response for US invitation. Walt Rostow, the National Security Advisor at the time, said it was a 20 percent chance of the summit having a good effect on Soviet–US relations, and only a 10 percent chance of the summit going awry.

The Soviet Political Bureau (Politburo) were divided over the usefulness of the summit. Andrei Gromyko, the Minister of Foreign Affairs at the time and still not a member of the Politburo, was able to win support for it. Gromyko noted that Soviet-US dialogue which had been suspended in 1963 should be reactivated, despite the Vietnam War putting a great deal strain on the two countries' relations.

Kosygin had agreed to address the United Nations and as such, wished to conduct the summit in New York. Johnson, wary of encountering protesters against the war in Vietnam, preferred to meet in Washington, D.C. Roughly equidistant, Hollybush, the residence of the President of Glassboro State College (now Rowan University) in Glassboro, New Jersey was selected as a compromise.

== The summit ==
=== Vietnam War ===
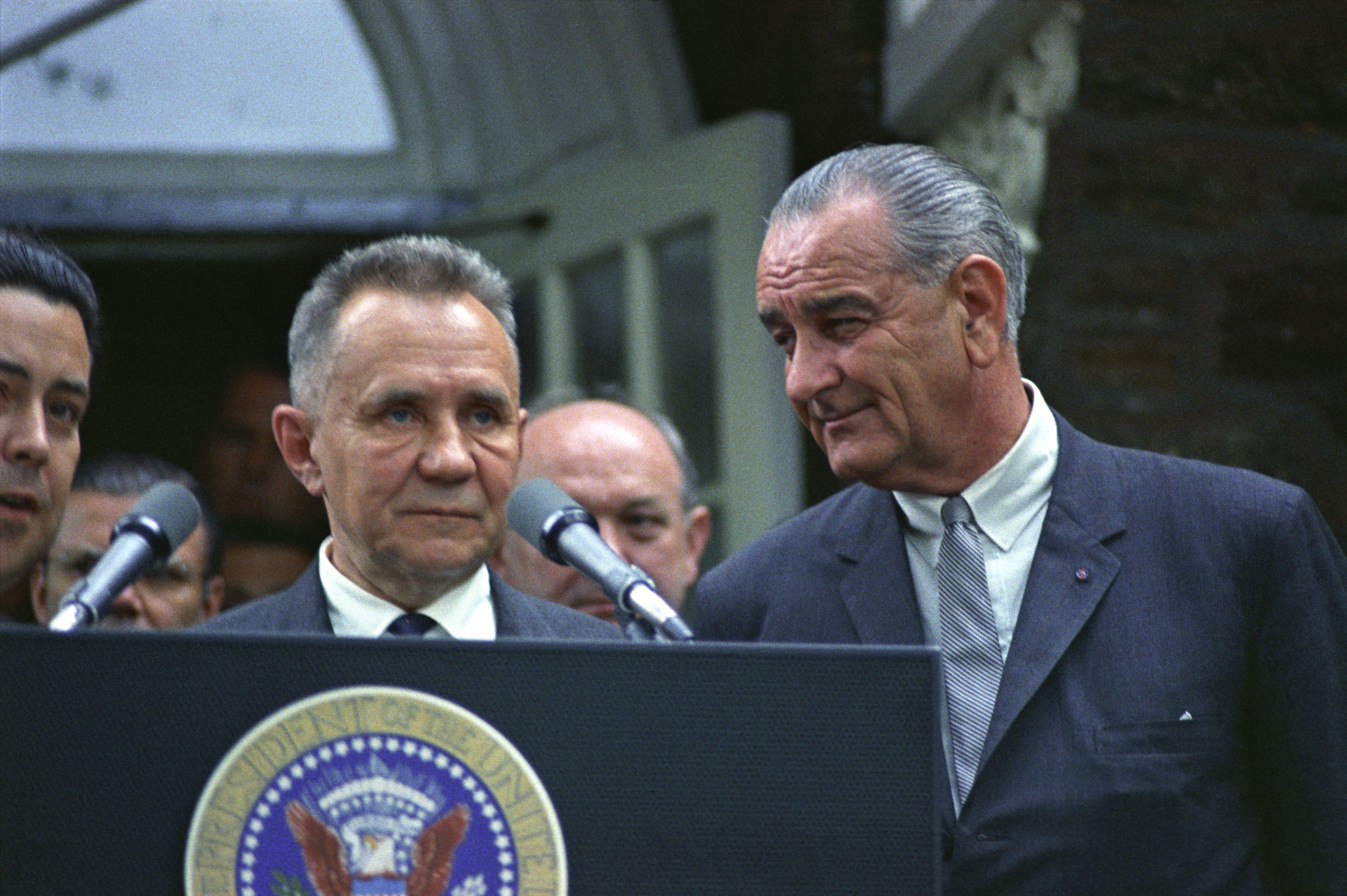
Alexei Kosygin with U.S. President Lyndon B. Johnson at the summit.

In their first meeting, held on 23 June 1967, only four people were present: Alexei Kosygin and Lyndon B. Johnson and their respective interpreters. The main subjects discussed between the two were the ongoing crisis in the Middle East and the Soviet-US arms race. Towards the end of the meeting, Johnson said he was willing to discuss a peace settlement to the war in Vietnam: meaning to divide the country in half, one part to be communist and another part to be capitalist. He assured Kosygin that the only reason for American bombing in North Vietnam was North Vietnamese intervention into South Vietnam. Johnson offered to supervise the democratic elections in South Vietnam in the aftermath of the war. Kosygin responded by returning to the original subject: the crisis in the Middle East.

During their afternoon meeting, Kosygin told Johnson that he was recently in contact with Phạm Văn Đồng, the Prime Minister of North Vietnam, and that they had discussed the possibilities of putting an end to the war. The North Vietnamese reply came during Kosygin's lunch with Johnson. Kosygin compared the Vietnam War to the Algerian War which had ended when Charles de Gaulle's France signed a peace treaty signifying the end of French colonisation of Algeria; he believed a similar result would happen for the United States if the war continued. He also made it very clear that the North Vietnamese would not give up their goal of a unified communist Vietnam too easily.

Johnson was worried about a North Vietnamese betrayal, saying he would be "crucified" politically in the United States if the North Vietnamese sent their troops into South Vietnam after the United States stopped bombing them. Kosygin, relieving Johnson of his worries, said that a North Vietnamese delegation would meet anywhere in the world to discuss a peace settlement with the Americans.

== The Spirit of Glassboro ==
The two world leaders met for three days, from 23 June to 25 June 1967, at Hollybush Mansion, home of the college president. Although Johnson and Kosygin failed to reach agreement on limiting anti-ballistic missile systems, the generally amicable atmosphere of the summit was referred to as the "Spirit of Glassboro".

== See also ==
- List of Soviet Union–United States summits (1943 to 1991)
