= Whitney Mansion (Glassboro, New Jersey) =

Historic house in New Jersey, United States

- U.S. National Register of Historic Places
- New Jersey Register of Historic Places
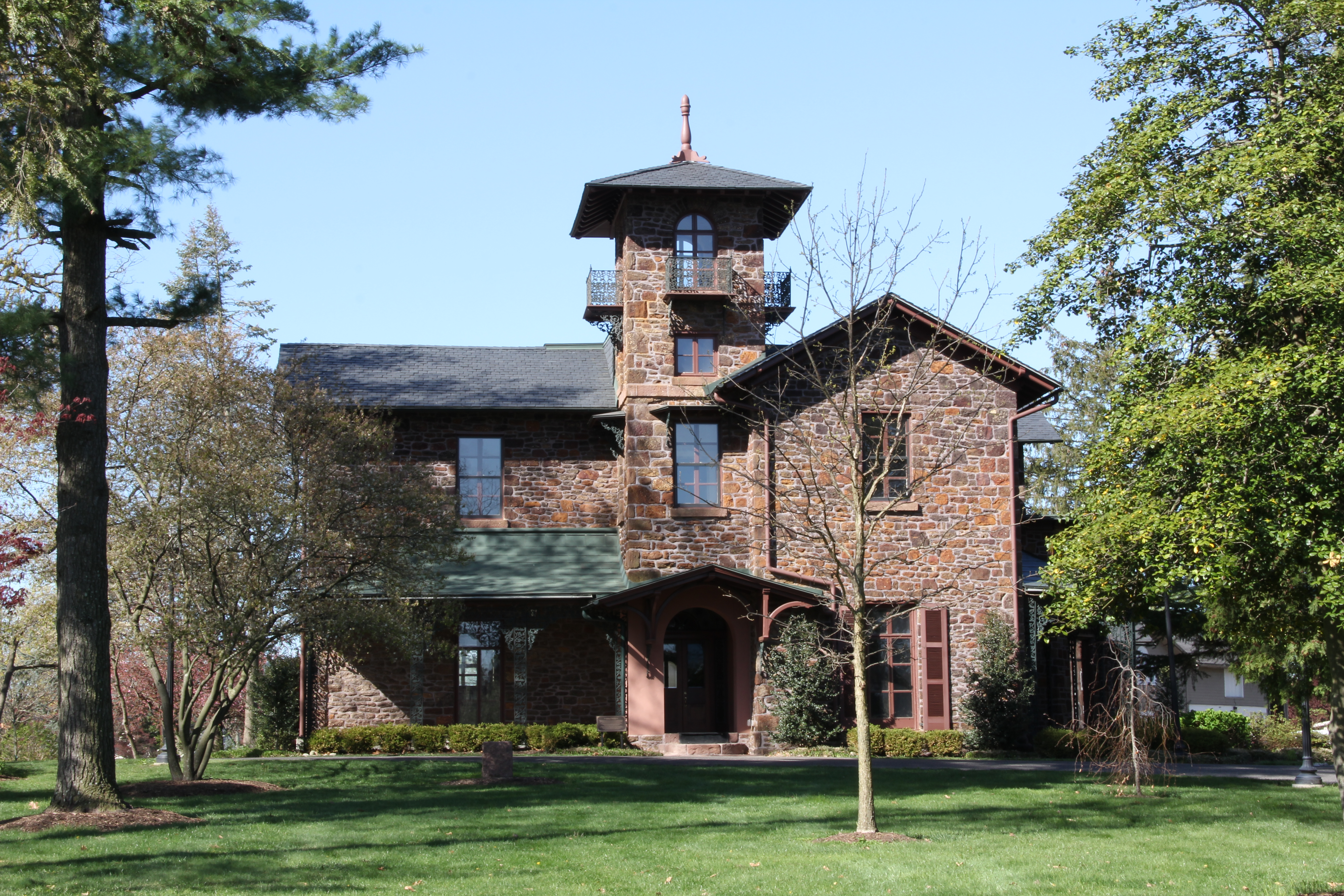

- Location within Gloucester County, New Jersey Location within New Jersey Location within the United States
- Location: Whitney Avenue, Glassboro, New Jersey
- Coordinates: 39°42′23″N 75°07′04″W
- Area: 2 acres (0.81 ha)
- Built: 1849
- Architect: John Notman
- Architectural style: Italian Villa
- NRHP reference No.: 72000795
- NJRHP No.: 1380

Significant dates
- Added to NRHP: December 5, 1972
- Designated NJRHP: March 15, 1972

Whitney Mansion, also known as Hollybush Mansion, is a historic house located on the campus of Rowan University in Glassboro, Gloucester County, New Jersey. It was used as the Rowan University President's Residence until 1998. Since 2003, Rowan University has spent more than $3 million to restore the mansion, which is now used as a meeting place and museum.

Originally the home of the Whitney family, it was the first of its kind in South Jersey, setting a precedent with its Italianate architectural style. Its interior decorations attest to this precedent, featuring significantly unique elements such as the trompe de l'oeil ceilings in the parlor and the Summit Room, as well as the painted glass archway above and around the front door. The stone used in the construction of Hollybush was New Jersey Ironstone, a sedimentary type of stone found in the low hills and ridges of South Jersey.

== Glassboro Summit ==
On June 23 and 25, 1967, the mansion hosted the Glassboro Summit Conference between United States President Lyndon B. Johnson and Soviet Union Premier Alexei Kosygin. The home of Glassboro State College president Thomas E. Robinson was chosen as a compromise: Kosygin was in New York to address the United Nations, Johnson preferred Washington, and Glassboro sat roughly midway between the two cities. Johnson and Kosygin held three private meetings in the mansion's study and lunched with their delegations in its dining room on both days. The leaders reached no agreement on limiting anti-ballistic missile systems, but the summit's amicable tone became known as the "Spirit of Glassboro".

The mansion was built in 1849 and was added to the National Register of Historic Places on December 5, 1972, for its significance in architecture and politics/government.

== See also ==
- Rowan University
- National Register of Historic Places listings in Gloucester County, New Jersey
