= George Johnson (defensive end) =

American football player (born 1989)

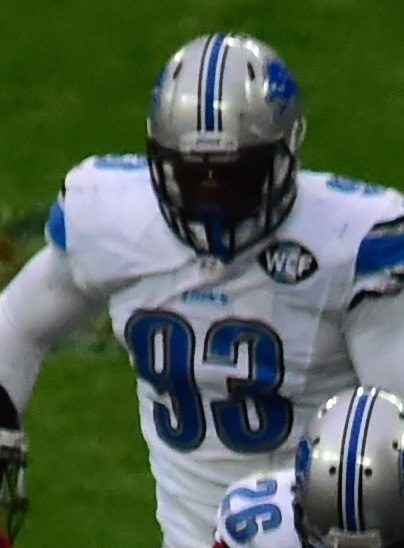
- Johnson with the Detroit Lions in 2014

No. 97, 92, 93, 94, 96, 90
- Position: Defensive end

Personal information
- Born: December 11, 1987 (age 38); Glassboro, New Jersey, U.S.
- Listed height: 6 ft 4 in (1.93 m)
- Listed weight: 265 lb (120 kg)

Career information
- High school: Glassboro
- College: Rutgers
- NFL draft: 2010: undrafted

Career history
- Tampa Bay Buccaneers (2010–2012); Minnesota Vikings (2012–2013); Detroit Lions (2014); Tampa Bay Buccaneers (2015–2016); Detroit Lions (2017); New Orleans Saints (2017); New York Guardians (2020)*
- * Offseason or practice squad member only

Career NFL statistics
- Total tackles: 66
- Sacks: 8.5
- Forced fumbles: 2
- Fumble recoveries: 2
- Stats at Pro Football Reference

George Johnson (born December 11, 1987) is an American former professional football player who was a defensive end in the National Football League (NFL). He was originally signed by the Tampa Bay Buccaneers as an undrafted free agent in 2010. He played college football for the Rutgers Scarlet Knights. He also played for the Minnesota Vikings, Detroit Lions, and New Orleans Saints.

== Early life ==
Johnson grew up in Glassboro, New Jersey, and starred at Glassboro High School, where he returns annually to run a football camp.

== Professional career ==
=== Tampa Bay Buccaneers (first stint) ===
Johnson was signed by the Tampa Bay Buccaneers as an undrafted free agent on May 3, 2010. The Buccaneers released him on August 10, 2010, but signed him two weeks later. On September 5, 2010, Tampa Bay signed him to their practice squad. He was promoted to the active roster on December 14, but did not play in a game that season.

=== Minnesota Vikings ===
On November 9, 2012, Johnson was signed to the Minnesota Vikings' practice squad. He was promoted to the active roster on December 22, 2012. He was released on October 9, 2013.

=== Detroit Lions (first stint) ===
On April 21, 2014, Johnson was signed by the Detroit Lions. In the first game of the 2014 season against the New York Giants, he recorded 1.5 sacks.

Set to be a restricted free agent in 2015, the Lions tendered a one-year contract to Johnson. On April 7, 2015, the Tampa Bay Buccaneers extended a three-year offer sheet to Johnson. The Lions then disputed the sheet on April 13, 2015, sending it to arbitration.

=== Tampa Bay Buccaneers (second stint) ===
On April 15, 2015, the Lions then traded Johnson and a seventh-round pick to the Buccaneers in exchange for a fifth-round pick. He played in 15 games with 5 starts his first year in Tampa, recording 23 tackles and two forced fumbles.

On August 5, 2016, Johnson was placed on season-ending injured reserve with a hip injury.

On September 1, 2017, Johnson was released by the Buccaneers.

=== Detroit Lions (second stint) ===
On September 20, 2017, Johnson was signed by the Lions. He was released on October 18, 2017. He was re-signed again on November 14, but was released the next day.

=== New Orleans Saints ===
On December 12, 2017, Johnson signed with the New Orleans Saints. In his first game with New Orleans against the New York Jets, he recorded a sack. In the following contest against the Atlanta Falcons, he was credited with another 1.5 sacks.

On March 7, 2018, Johnson signed a one-year contract extension with the Saints for $1.005 million. He was released on September 1, 2018.

=== New York Guardians ===
In October 2019, Johnson was selected by the New York Guardians in the open phase of the 2020 XFL draft. He was released during mini-camp in December 2019.
