= Glassboro, New Jersey =

Borough in Gloucester County, New Jersey, US

- Borough
- Clockwise from top left: Glassblower statue, Bunce Hall at Rowan University, glass bottles from area glassworks, Glassboro Municipal Building, Whitney Mansion, panorama of the Rowan Boulevard downtown area, Glassboro Water Tower, and Historic West Jersey Depot (old train station)

- Working Logo
- Nicknames: Summit City; Borough of Glass
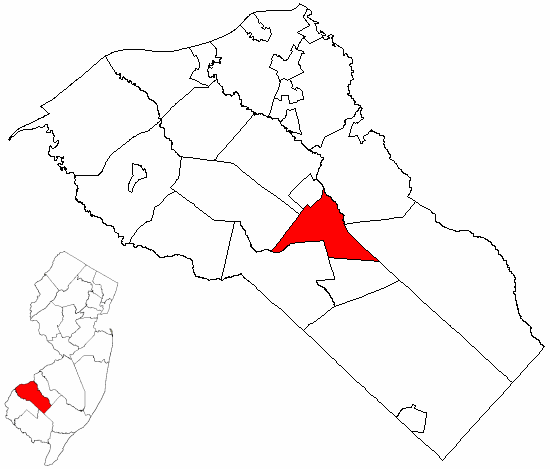
- Location of Glassboro in Gloucester County highlighted in red (right). Inset map: Location of Gloucester County in New Jersey highlighted in red (left).

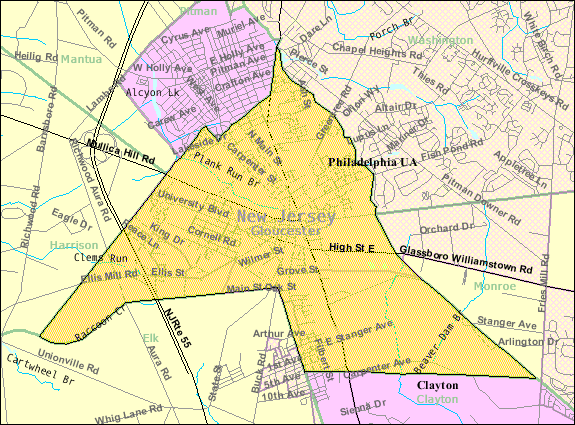
- Census Bureau map of Glassboro, New Jersey

- Location in Gloucester County Location in New Jersey Location in the United States
- Coordinates: 39.700096°N 75.111423°W
- Country: United States
- State: New Jersey
- County: Gloucester
- Established: 1779
- Incorporated: March 11, 1878
- Named for: Glass industry

Government
  - Type: Borough
  - Body: Borough Council
  - Mayor: John E. Wallace III (D, term ends December 31, 2026)
  - Administrator: Ed Malandro
  - Municipal clerk: Karen Cosgrove

Area
  - Total: 9.36 sq mi (24.24 km^{2})
  - Land: 9.32 sq mi (24.14 km^{2})
  - Water: 0.039 sq mi (0.10 km^{2}) 0.41%
  - Rank: 213th of 565 in state 14th of 24 in county
- Elevation: 148 ft (45 m)

Population (2020)
  - Total: 23,149
  - Estimate (2023): 23,987
  - Rank: 115th of 565 in state 4th of 24 in county
  - Density: 2,483.8/sq mi (959.0/km^{2})
  - Rank: 254th of 565 in state 8th of 24 in county
- Time zone: UTC−05:00 (Eastern (EST))
  - Summer (DST): UTC−04:00 (Eastern (EDT))
- ZIP Code: 08028
- Area code: +1 (856) exchanges: 442, 863, 881, 256 (Rowan University)
- FIPS code: 3401526340
- GNIS feature ID: 0885231
- Website: www.glassboro.org

Glassboro is a borough within Gloucester County, in the U.S. state of New Jersey, within the Philadelphia metropolitan area. As of the 2020 United States census, the borough's population was 23,149, its highest decennial count ever and an increase of 4,570 (+24.6%) from the 18,579 recorded at the 2010 census, which in turn had reflected a decline of 489 (−2.6%) from the 19,068 counted in the 2000 census. Much of the recent and projected growth in Glassboro have been attributed to the growth trajectory of Rowan University, founded in 1923 and formerly known as Glassboro State College. Glassboro and surrounding Gloucester County constitute part of South Jersey.

What is now Glassboro was originally formed as a township by an act of the New Jersey Legislature on March 11, 1878, from portions of Clayton Township. Portions of the township were taken to form Elk Township (April 17, 1891) and Pitman (May 24, 1905). Glassboro was incorporated as a borough on March 18, 1920, replacing Glassboro Township. The borough was named for its glass industry.

== History ==
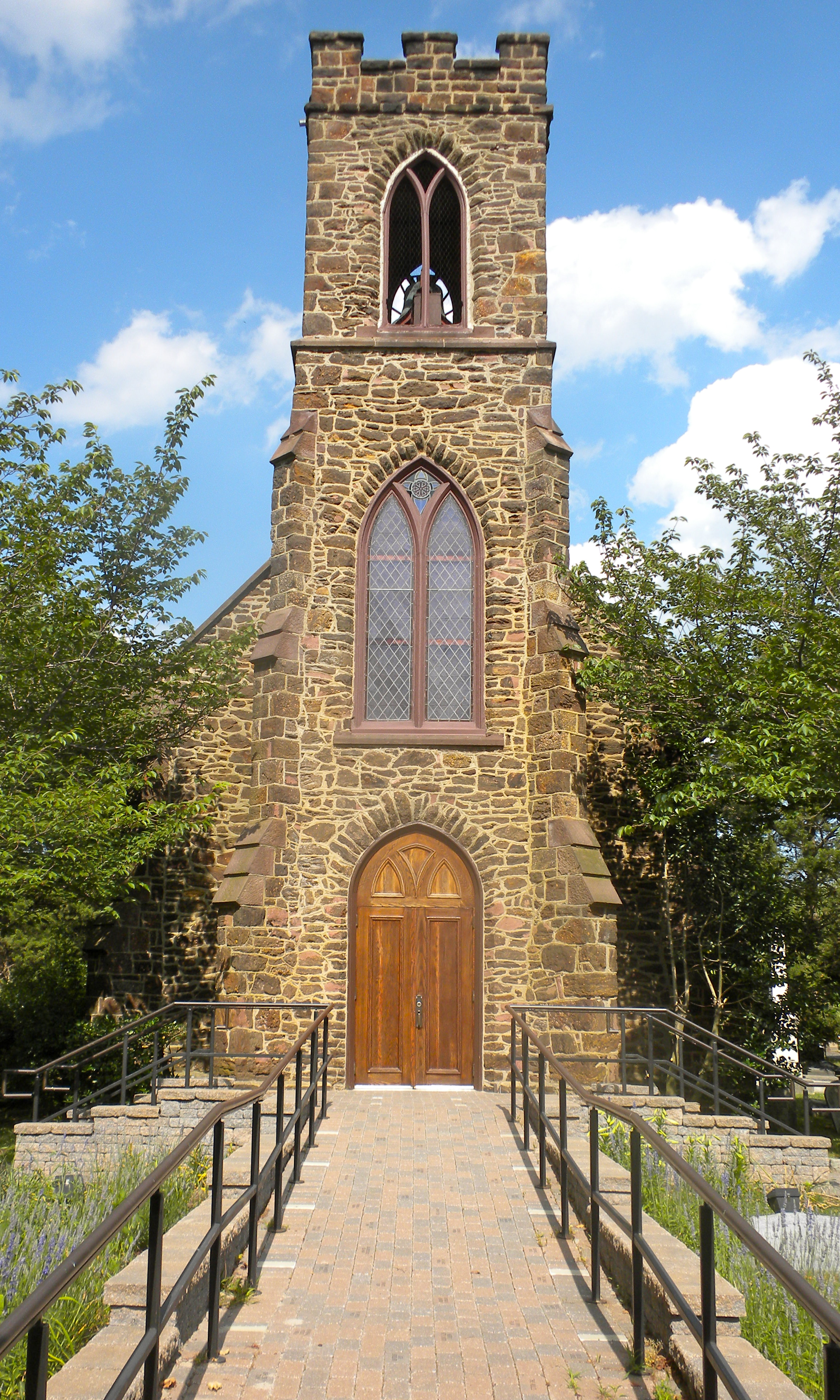
St. Thomas Episcopal Church, built in 1846, is one of Glassboro's oldest buildings.

Glassboro's early industrial history was built on the manufacturing of glass. The town was first established in 1779 by Solomon Stanger as Glass Works in the Woods. Glass manufacturers over the years since include Heston-Carpenter Glass Works, Olive Glass Works, Harmony Glass Works, Temperanceville Glass Works, Whitney Brothers Glass Works, Owens Bottle Company, Owens Illinois Glass Company, and Anchor Hocking.

Rowan University, formerly Glassboro State College, was founded in 1923. The university was the site of the Glassboro Summit Conference in 1967 between U.S. President Lyndon B. Johnson and Soviet Premier Alexei Kosygin. In 1958, a typhoid fever epidemic broke out in the predominantly African-American neighborhoods of Elsmere and Lawns, which was attributed to 20 years of municipal neglect of the sanitary infrastructure in these neighborhoods.

The Glassboro Summit Conference between U.S. President Lyndon B. Johnson and Soviet Premier Alexei Kosygin took place in Glassboro. Johnson and Kosygin met for three days from June 23 to June 25, 1967, at Glassboro State College (later renamed Rowan University). The location was chosen as a compromise. Kosygin, having agreed to address the United Nations in New York City, wanted to meet in New York City. Johnson, wary of encountering protests against the Vietnam War, preferred to meet in Washington, D.C. They agreed in Glassboro because it was equidistant between the two cities. The summit's generally amicable atmosphere was referred to as the "Spirit of Glassboro," although the leaders failed to reach agreement on limiting anti-ballistic missile systems.

On June 19, 1986, Ronald Reagan became the first sitting president to speak at a high school graduation when he spoke at the Glassboro High School commencement ceremonies.

== Geography ==
According to the U.S. Census Bureau, the borough had a total area of 9.36 square miles (24.24 km^{2}), including 9.32 square miles (24.14 km^{2}) of land and 0.04 square miles (0.10 km^{2}) of water (0.41%). Unincorporated communities, localities and place names located partially or completely within the borough include Elsemere.

Glassboro borders the Gloucester County municipalities of Clayton Borough, Elk Township, Harrison Township, Mantua Township, Monroe Township, Pitman, and Washington Township.

=== Climate ===
The area is characterized by hot, humid summers and generally mild to cool winters. According to the Köppen Climate Classification system, Glassboro has a humid subtropical climate, abbreviated "Cfa" on climate maps.

== Demographics ==
Historical population
Census	Pop.	Note	%±
1880	2,088		—
1890	2,642		26.5%
1900	2,677	*	1.3%
1910	2,821	*	5.4%
1920	3,073		8.9%
1930	4,799		56.2%
1940	4,925		2.6%
1950	5,867		19.1%
1960	10,253		74.8%
1970	12,938		26.2%
1980	14,574		12.6%
1990	15,614		7.1%
2000	19,068		22.1%
2010	18,579		−2.6%
2020	23,149		24.6%
2023 (est.)	23,987	▲	3.6%
Population sources: 1880–2000; 1880–1920 1880–1890; 1890–1910 1910–1930; 1940–2000 2000; 2010 2020 * = Lost territory in previous decade.

=== 2020 census ===
As of the 2020 census, Glassboro had a population of 23,149. The median age was 24.6 years. 13.1% of residents were under the age of 18 and 12.6% of residents were 65 years of age or older. For every 100 females there were 104.9 males, and for every 100 females age 18 and over there were 104.2 males age 18 and over.

97.4% of residents lived in urban areas, while 2.6% lived in rural areas.

There were 6,859 households in Glassboro, of which 24.3% had children under the age of 18 living in them. Of all households, 40.3% were married-couple households, 21.7% were households with a male householder and no spouse or partner present, and 31.4% were households with a female householder and no spouse or partner present. About 28.5% of all households were made up of individuals and 10.5% had someone living alone who was 65 years of age or older.

There were 7,953 housing units, of which 13.8% were vacant. The homeowner vacancy rate was 0.9% and the rental vacancy rate was 13.1%.

Racial composition as of the 2020 census
Race	Number	Percent
White	15,074	65.1%
Black or African American	4,222	18.2%
American Indian and Alaska Native	67	0.3%
Asian	1,009	4.4%
Native Hawaiian and Other Pacific Islander	6	0.0%
Some other race	1,107	4.8%
Two or more races	1,664	7.2%
Hispanic or Latino (of any race)	2,529	10.9%

=== 2010 census ===
The 2010 United States census counted 18,579 people, 6,158 households, and 3,972 families in the borough. The population density was 2,022.9 inhabitants per square mile (781.0/km^{2}). There were 6,590 housing units at an average density of 717.5 per square mile (277.0/km^{2}). The racial makeup was 72.25% (13,423) White, 18.67% (3,469) Black or African American, 0.11% (21) Native American, 2.87% (534) Asian, 0.05% (10) Pacific Islander, 3.12% (580) from other races, and 2.92% (542) from two or more races. Hispanic or Latino of any race were 7.42% (1,378) of the population.

Of the 6,158 households, 28.1% had children under the age of 18; 44.4% were married couples living together; 16.0% had a female householder with no husband present and 35.5% were non-families. Of all households, 22.5% were made up of individuals and 7.8% had someone living alone who was 65 years of age or older. The average household size was 2.66 and the average family size was 3.13.

19.4% of the population were under the age of 18, 26.4% from 18 to 24, 21.1% from 25 to 44, 22.4% from 45 to 64, and 10.7% who were 65 years of age or older. The median age was 28.4 years. For every 100 females, the population had 97.1 males. For every 100 females ages 18 and older there were 95.0 males.

The Census Bureau's 2006–2010 American Community Survey showed that (in 2010 inflation-adjusted dollars) median household income was $54,795 (with a margin of error of +/− $3,793) and the median family income was $67,171 (+/− $9,496). Males had a median income of $49,695 (+/− $4,361) versus $43,489 (+/− $2,608) for females. The per capita income for the borough was $23,108 (+/− $1,421). About 9.3% of families and 14.5% of the population were below the poverty line, including 18.6% of those under age 18 and 5.0% of those age 65 or over.

=== 2000 census ===
As of the 2000 census, there were 19,068 people, 6,225 households, and 4,046 families residing in the borough. The population density was 2,071.3 inhabitants per square mile (799.7/km^{2}). There were 6,555 housing units at an average density of 712.0 per square mile (274.9/km^{2}). The racial makeup of the borough was 74.5% White, 19.5% African American, 0.2% Native American, 2.3% Asian, 0.1% Pacific Islander, 1.5% from other races, and 2.0% from two or more races. Hispanic or Latino of any race were 3.8% of the population.

There were 6,225 households, out of which 32.5% had children under the age of 18 living with them, 46.3% were married couples living together, 14.6% had a female householder with no husband present, and 35.0% were non-families. 23.6% of all households were made up of individuals, and 8.4% had someone living alone who was 65 years of age or older. The average household size was 2.66 and the average family size was 3.17.

In the borough, the population was spread out, with 22.1% under the age of 18, 25.6% from 18 to 24, 25.9% from 25 to 44, 16.6% from 45 to 64, and 9.8% who were 65 years of age or older. The median age was 27 years. For every 100 females, there were 91.8 males. For every 100 females age 18 and over, there were 89.3 males.

The median income for a household in the borough was $44,992, and the median income for a family was $55,246. Males had a median income of $40,139 versus $30,358 for females. The per capita income for the borough was $18,113. About 8.5% of families and 15.2% of the population were below the poverty line, including 15.6% of those under age 18 and 7.9% of those age 65 or over.

== Parks and recreation ==
The Glassboro Wildlife Management Area covers almost 2,400 acres (970 ha) in portions of Glassboro, Clayton, and Monroe Township.

== Government ==
=== Local government ===
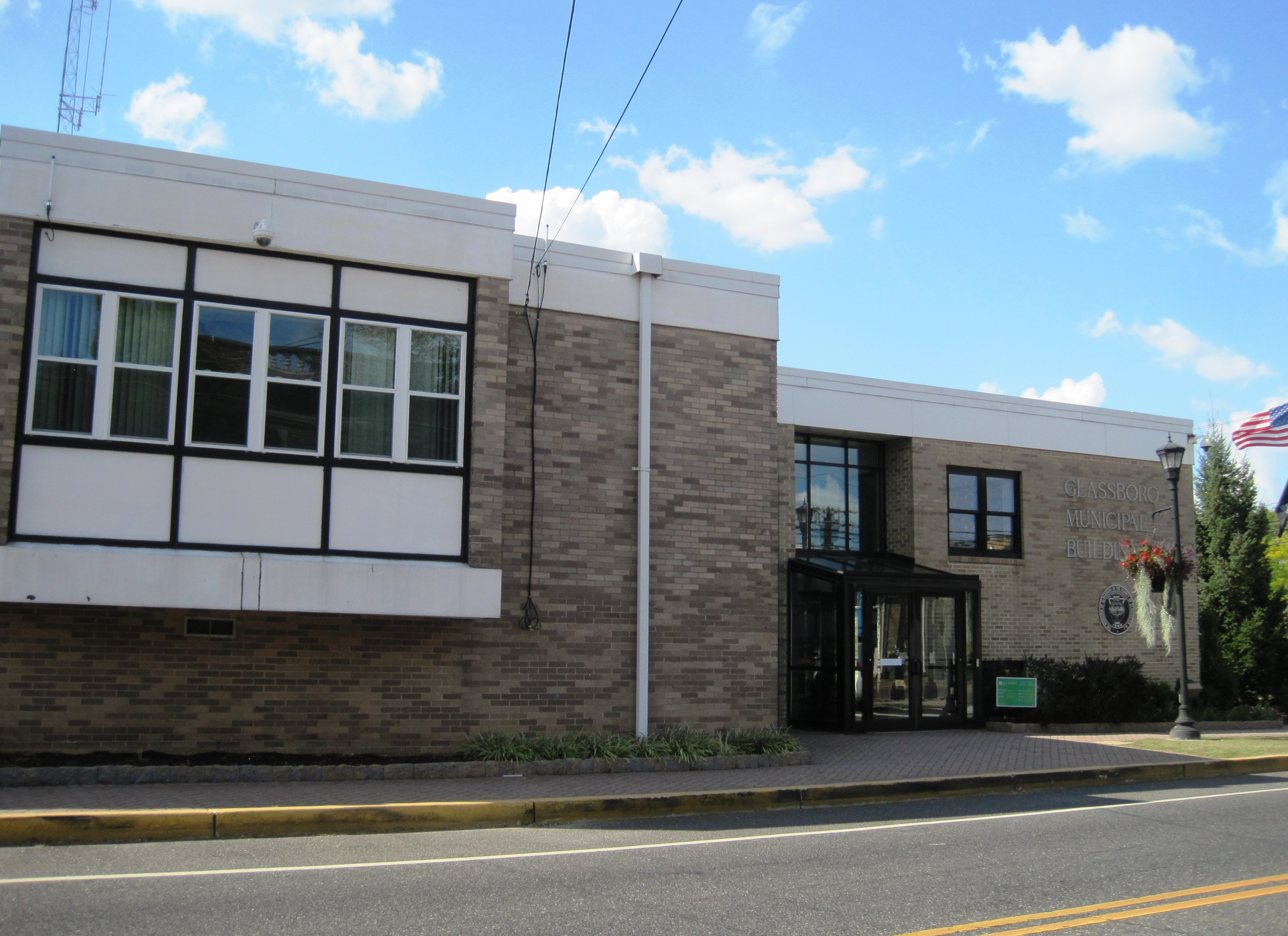
Glassboro Municipal Building

Glassboro is governed under the borough form of New Jersey municipal government, which is used in 218 municipalities (of the 564) statewide, making it the most common form of government in New Jersey. The governing body is comprised of the mayor and the borough council, with all positions elected at-large on a partisan basis as part of the November general election. The mayor is elected directly by the voters to a four-year term of office. The borough council is comprised of six members elected to serve three-year terms on a staggered basis, with two seats coming up for election each year in a three-year cycle. The borough form of government used by Glassboro is a "weak mayor / strong council" government in which council members act as the legislative body with the mayor presiding at meetings and voting only in the event of a tie. The mayor can veto ordinances subject to an override by a two-thirds majority vote of the council. The mayor makes committee and liaison assignments for council members, and most appointments are made by the mayor with the advice and consent of the council.

As of 2025, the mayor of Glassboro is Democrat John E. Wallace, whose term of office ends December 31, 2026. Members of the borough council, and the years their terms expire, are Council President Anna Miller (D, 2027), Timothy D. Brown (D, 2026), George P. Cossabone Sr. (D, 2025), Deanna L. Garlic (D, 2026), Andrew Halter (D, 2027), Daniele Brida Spence (D, 2025).

In March 2019, Danielle Spence was selected to fill the seat on the Borough Council expiring in December 2019 that had been held by Edward A. Malandro. Spence served on an interim basis until the November 2019 general election, when she was elected to serve the balance of the term of office and won a full three-year term, while Anthony J. Fiola was elected to serve an unexpired term.

Anna Miller was appointed by the borough council in March 2013 from among three candidates offered by the municipal Democratic committee to fill the vacant seat of George Cossabone.

=== Federal, state, and county representation ===
Glassboro is located in the 1st Congressional District and is part of New Jersey's 3rd state legislative district.

For the 119th United States Congress, New Jersey's 1st congressional district is represented by Donald Norcross (D, Camden). New Jersey is represented in the United States Senate by Democrats Cory Booker (Newark, term ends 2027) and Andy Kim (Moorestown, term ends 2031).

For the 2026–2027 session, the 3rd legislative district of the New Jersey Legislature is represented in the State Senate by John Burzichelli (D, Paulsboro) and in the General Assembly by David Bailey (D, Woodstown) and Heather Simmons (D, Glassboro).

Gloucester County is governed by a board of county commissioners, whose seven members are elected at-large to three-year terms of office on a staggered basis in partisan elections, with either two or three seats coming up for election each year. At a reorganization meeting held each January, the Board selects a Director and a Deputy Director from among its members. As of 2025, Gloucester County's Commissioners are:

Director Frank J. DiMarco (D, Deptford Township, 2025), Matt Weng (D, Pitman, 2026), Joann Gattinelli (D, Washington Township, 2026), Nicholas DeSilvio (R, Franklin Township, 2027), Denice DiCarlo (D, West Deptford Township, 2025) Deputy Director Jim Jefferson (D, Woodbury, 2026) and Christopher Konawel Jr. (R, Glassboro, 2027).

Gloucester County's constitutional officers are: Clerk James N. Hogan (D, Franklin Township; 2027), Sheriff Carmel Morina (D, Greenwich Township; 2027) and Surrogate Giuseppe "Joe" Chila (D, Woolwich Township; 2028).

=== Politics ===
United States presidential election results for Glassboro 2024 2020 2016 2012 2008 2004
Year	Republican		Democratic		Third party(ies)	
Year	No.	%	No.	%	No.	%
2024	3,353	41.20%	4,637	56.97%	149	1.83%
2020	3,320	38.52%	5,162	59.90%	136	1.58%
2016	2,779	38.67%	4,135	57.54%	272	3.79%
2012	2,485	34.56%	4,578	63.66%	128	1.78%
2008	2,547	35.75%	4,516	63.38%	62	0.87%
2004	2,699	40.35%	3,930	58.75%	60	0.90%

As of March 2011, there were a total of 9,772 registered voters in Glassboro, of which 3,733 (38.2%) were registered as Democrats, 1,408 (14.4%) were registered as Republicans and 4,617 (47.2%) were registered as Unaffiliated. There were 14 voters registered as Libertarians or Greens.

In the 2020 presidential election, Democrat Joe Biden received 59.9% of the vote (5,162 cast), ahead of Republican Donald Trump with 38.5% (3,320), and other candidates with 1.6% among the 8,798 ballots cast by the borough's 11,661 voters, for a turnout of 75.4%. In the 2016 presidential election, Democrat Hillary Clinton received 56.3% of the vote (4,135 cast), ahead of Republican Donald Trump with 37.8% (2,779 votes), and other candidates with 5.9% among the 7,347 ballots cast by the borough's 11,512 registered voters, for a turnout of 63.8%. In the 2012 presidential election, Democrat Barack Obama received 63.7% of the vote (4,578 cast), ahead of Republican Mitt Romney with 34.6% (2,485 votes), and other candidates with 1.8% (128 votes), among the 7,252 ballots cast by the borough's 10,804 registered voters (61 ballots were spoiled), for a turnout of 67.1%. In the 2008 presidential election, Democrat Barack Obama received 62.8% of the vote (4,516 cast), ahead of Republican John McCain with 35.4% (2,547 votes) and other candidates with 0.9% (62 votes), among the 7,195 ballots cast by the borough's 10,312 registered voters, for a turnout of 69.8%. In the 2004 presidential election, Democrat John Kerry received 58.5% of the vote (3,930 ballots cast), outpolling Republican George W. Bush with 40.1% (2,699 votes) and other candidates with 0.6% (60 votes), among the 6,723 ballots cast by the borough's 9,801 registered voters, for a turnout percentage of 68.6.

Gubernatorial election results for Glassboro
Year	Republican		Democratic		Third party(ies)	
Year	No.	%	No.	%	No.	%
2025	2,378	37.71%	3,874	61.43%	54	0.86%
2021	2,192	44.32%	2,705	54.69%	49	0.99%
2017	1,299	33.16%	2,493	63.65%	125	3.19%
2013	2,106	53.02%	1,786	44.96%	80	2.01%
2009	1,659	39.76%	2,198	52.67%	316	7.57%
2005	1,426	36.26%	2,358	59.95%	149	3.79%

In the 2013 gubernatorial election, Republican Chris Christie received 53.0% of the vote (2,106 cast), ahead of Democrat Barbara Buono with 45.0% (1,786 votes), and other candidates with 2.0% (80 votes), among the 4,074 ballots cast by the borough's 10,838 registered voters (102 ballots were spoiled), for a turnout of 37.6%. In the 2009 gubernatorial election, Democrat Jon Corzine received 51.7% of the vote (2,198 ballots cast), ahead of Republican Chris Christie with 39.0% (1,659 votes), Independent Chris Daggett with 6.7% (287 votes) and other candidates with 0.7% (29 votes), among the 4,255 ballots cast by the borough's 9,958 registered voters, yielding a 42.7% turnout.

United States Senate election results for Glassboro1
Year	Republican		Democratic		Third party(ies)	
Year	No.	%	No.	%	No.	%
2024	3,056	38.92%	4,666	59.42%	130	1.66%
2018	2,312	41.32%	3,022	54.01%	261	4.66%
2012	2,184	31.66%	4,520	65.53%	194	2.81%
2006	1,420	36.66%	2,357	60.86%	96	2.48%

United States Senate election results for Glassboro2
Year	Republican		Democratic		Third party(ies)	
Year	No.	%	No.	%	No.	%
2020	3,219	37.85%	5,114	60.13%	172	2.02%
2014	1,183	34.49%	2,185	63.70%	62	1.81%
2013	799	35.43%	1,428	63.33%	28	1.24%
2008	2,297	34.63%	4,178	62.99%	158	2.38%

== Education ==
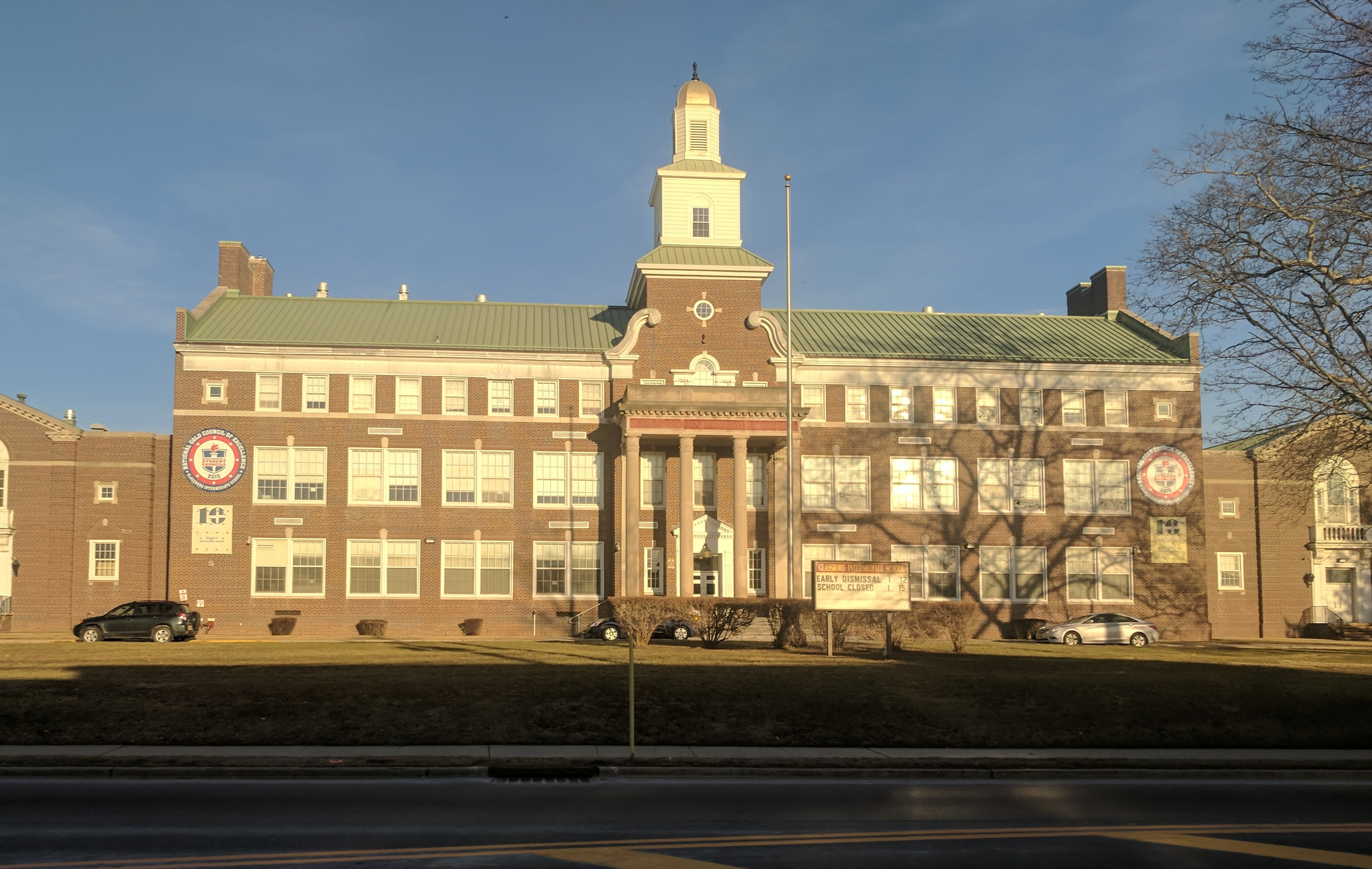
Former Glassboro High School

The Glassboro Public Schools serve students in pre-kindergarten through twelfth grade. As of the 2022–23 school year, the district, comprised of four schools, had an enrollment of 1,895 students and 155.7 classroom teachers (on an FTE basis), for a student–teacher ratio of 12.2:1. Schools in the district (with 2022–23 enrollment data from the National Center for Education Statistics) are J. Harvey Rodgers School with 265 students in grades PreK and kindergarten, Dorothy L. Bullock School with 651 students in grades 1-5, Thomas E. Bowe Elementary School with 432 students in grades 6-8 and Glassboro High School with 518 students in grades 9-12.

Students in Gloucester County are eligible to apply to attend Gloucester County Institute of Technology, a four-year high school in Deptford Township that provides technical and vocational education. As a public school, students do not pay tuition to attend the school.

Guardian Angels Regional School is a K-8 school that operates under the auspices of the Roman Catholic Diocese of Camden and accepts students from Glassboro. Its PreK-3 campus is in Gibbstown while its 4-8 campus is in Paulsboro. Our Lady of Lourdes in Glassboro is one of the sending parishes; the former St. Bridget Regional School in Glassboro merged into St. Michael in 2008.

Rowan University is a public university with an enrollment of 19,500 undergraduate and graduate students in 2018–2019. The university was founded in 1923 as Glassboro Normal School on a 25-acre (10 ha) site donated by the borough. The school became New Jersey State Teachers College at Glassboro in 1937 and Glassboro State College in 1958. Beginning in the 1970s, the university expanded into a multi-purpose institution, adding programs in business, communications, and engineering. Rowan Boulevard is a mixed-use development intended to provide a vibrant downtown district for Glassboro, incorporating university student life into its design as part of an effort to accommodate a student body that has been projected to grow to about 25,000 in 2023.

== Transportation ==
=== Roads and highways ===
As of May 2010, the borough had a total of 78.43 miles (126.22 km) of roadways, of which 57.61 miles (92.71 km) were maintained by the municipality, 13.29 miles (21.39 km) by Gloucester County and 7.53 miles (12.12 km) by the New Jersey Department of Transportation.

Glassboro is crisscrossed by a number of major roads. These include County Route 553, Route 47 and Route 55 (limited access) travel north–south, while U.S. Route 322 (much of which is also Mullica Hill Road) passes through east–west.

=== Public transportation ===
NJ Transit provides bus service to and from Philadelphia on the 313, 408 and 412 routes. The Pureland East-West Community Shuttle connects the Pureland Industrial Complex and the Avandale Park and Ride.

Passenger train service to Glassboro was available from 1860 to 1971. The Glassboro station used by the Pennsylvania-Reading Seashore Lines is being renovated as a visitor center. A new station at Rowan University in the vicinity of the historic depot is the planned for the proposed Glassboro–Camden Line, an 18-mile (28.97 km) diesel multiple unit (DMU) light rail system. The terminal station would be one stop further at Main and High streets.

=== Walking and cycling ===
Walking is a popular form of transportation especially around the university where many underclassmen are not permitted to have cars.

The Glassboro – Williamstown Trail, also known as the Monroe Township Bikepath, runs for more than 6 miles (9.7 km) between Glassboro and the Williamstown section of Monroe Township. The trail traverses the Glassboro State Wildlife Refuge before terminating at Delsea Drive. Future work will extend this trail along former railroad right of way from Delsea Drive to Rowan U's Bunce Hall. Path links to Elmer and Pitman are also proposed.

== Notable people ==
People who were born in, residents of, or otherwise closely associated with Glassboro include:

- Don Amendolia (born 1944), actor
- John Aveni (1935–2002), kicker for the Chicago Bears
- Gary Brackett (born 1980), linebacker on the Super Bowl XLI champion Indianapolis Colts
- Mark Lambert Bristol (1868–1939), rear admiral in the United States Navy
- King Kong Bundy (1955–2019), professional wrestler, stand-up comedian and actor
- Mary Carnell (1861–1925), photographer
- Betty Castor (born 1941), politician, 2004 U.S. Senate candidate in Florida and former president of The University of South Florida
- Corey Clement (born 1994), running back for the Super Bowl LII champion Philadelphia Eagles
- Joe Crispin (born 1979), former NBA player for the Phoenix Suns and Los Angeles Lakers
- Daniel Dalton (born 1949), politician who served as New Jersey Senate Majority Leader and as Secretary of State of New Jersey
- Sean F. Dalton (born 1962), Prosecutor of Gloucester County, New Jersey, who previously served two terms in the New Jersey General Assembly, where he represented the 4th Legislative District
- Thomas M. Ferrell (1844–1916), represented New Jersey's 1st congressional district in the United States House of Representatives from 1883 to 1885
- Cathe Friedrich (born 1964), athlete, instructor and innovator in the fitness video industry
- Kerry Getz (born 1975), professional skateboarder
- George Johnson (born 1987), defensive end for the Detroit Lions of the National Football League
- Juwan Johnson (born 1996), American football wide receiver for the New Orleans Saints of the National Football League
- Jarvis Lynch (born 1933), retired major general in the United States Marine Corps
- Oscar Moore (born 1938), long-distance runner who competed in the men's 5000 meters at the 1964 Summer Olympics
- Brian Oliver (born 1990), professional basketball player
- Thomas J. Osler (1940–2023), mathematician, former national champion distance runner and author
- Dorcas Reilly (1926–2018), chef, homemaker, and inventor, best known for popularizing the green bean casserole
- Keon Sabb (born 2002), American football safety for the Michigan Wolverines
- George H. Stanger (1902–1958), politician who served in the New Jersey Senate from 1938 to 1946
- Walter L. Stewart Jr. (born 1944), US Army major general, raised in Glassboro
